= Take No Prisoners (2008) =

Professional wrestling pay-per-view event

- Promotional poster
- Promotion: Ring of Honor
- Date: March 16, 2008 (aired May 30, 2008)
- City: Philadelphia, Pennsylvania
- Venue: Pennsylvania National Guard Armory
- Attendance: 1,200

Pay-per-view chronology
← Previous; Rising Above	Next → Respect is Earned II

Take No Prisoners chronology
← Previous; First	Next → 2009

Take No Prisoners (2008) was the inaugural Take No Prisoners professional wrestling pay-per-view (PPV) event produced by Ring of Honor (ROH). It took place on March 16, 2008 from the Pennsylvania National Guard Armory in Philadelphia, Pennsylvania.

== Storylines ==
Other on-screen personnel
Role	Name
Commentators	Dave Prazak
Commentators	Lenny Leonard

Take No Prisoners featured storylines and professional wrestling matches that involved different wrestlers from pre-existing scripted feuds and storylines. Storylines were produced on ROH's weekly television programme Ring of Honor Wrestling.

== Results ==
No.	Results	Stipulations	Times
1^{D}	Davey Richards defeated Dingo	Singles match	5:23
2^{D}	Sara Del Rey defeated Kylie Pierce	Women of Honor Singles match	—
3	Tyler Black defeated Go Shiozaki, Delirious and Claudio Castagnoli	Four-corner survival match	9:35
4^{D}	The Vulture Squad (Ruckus and Jigsaw) defeated The Hangmen 3 (Adam Pearce and B. J. Whitmer)	Tag team match	6:46
5	Kevin Steen defeated Roderick Strong	Singles match	11:12
6	The Briscoe Brothers (Jay Briscoe and Mark Briscoe) (with Daizee Haze) defeated The Age of the Fall (Joey Matthews and Necro Butcher) (with Lacey)	Tag team war	14:32
7^{D}	Bushwhacker Luke defeated Shane Hagadorn	Singles match	—
8	Brent Albright (with Larry Sweeney, Adam Pearce, B. J. Whitmer and Shane Hagadorn) defeated Erick Stevens	Singles match	6:17
9	No Remorse Corps (Davey Richards and Rocky Romero) (c) defeated The Vulture Squad (Ruckus and Jigsaw)	Tag team match for the ROH World Tag Team Championship	9:15
10	Bryan Danielson defeated Austin Aries by submission	Singles match	17:21
11	Nigel McGuiness (c) defeated Tyler Black	Singles match for the ROH World Championship	21:24
(c) / – the champion(s) heading into the match; D / – this was a dark match

== See also ==
- 2008 in professional wrestling
- List of Ring of Honor pay-per-view events
