= 2008 in professional wrestling =

2008 in professional wrestling describes the year's events in the world of professional wrestling.

== List of notable promotions ==
These promotions held notable events in 2008.

Promotion Name	Abbreviation	Notes
Consejo Mundial de Lucha Libre	CMLL	
Georgia Championship Wrestling	GCW	
Juggalo Championship Wrestling	JCW	
Lucha Libre AAA Worldwide	AAA	The "AAA" abbreviation has been used since the mid-1990s and had previously stood for the promotion's original name Asistencia Asesoría y Administración.
New Japan Pro-Wrestling	NJPW	
Pro Wrestling Guerrilla	PWG	
Ring of Honor	ROH	
Total Nonstop Action Wrestling	TNA	
World Wrestling Council	WWC	
World Wrestling Entertainment	WWE	WWE divided its roster into three storyline divisions, Raw, SmackDown, and ECW, referred to as brands, where wrestlers exclusively performed on their respective weekly television programs.

== Calendar of notable shows ==
=== January ===
Date	Promotion(s)	Event	Location	Main event	Notes
4	NJPW	Wrestle Kingdom II	Tokyo	Shinsuke Nakamura defeated Hiroshi Tanahashi (c) in a Singles match to win the IWGP Heavyweight Championship	
6	TNA	Final Resolution	Orlando, Florida	Kurt Angle (c) defeated Christian Cage in a Singles match to retain the TNA World Heavyweight Championship	
6	WWC	Euphoria	Bayamón, Puerto Rico	Mini Abismo Negro vs. Octagoncito	
27	WWE: Raw; SmackDown; ECW	Royal Rumble	New York, New York	John Cena won the 30-man Royal Rumble match by last eliminating Triple H to earn a world championship match at WrestleMania XXIV	This was the first WWE PPV to be broadcast in HD. John Cena chose to challenge for the WWE Championship, but used his title shot at No Way Out instead of waiting until WrestleMania.
(c) – denotes defending champion(s)

=== February ===
Date	Promotion(s)	Event	Location	Main event
10	TNA	Against All Odds	Greenville, South Carolina	Kurt Angle (c) defeated Christian Cage in a Singles match to retain the TNA World Heavyweight Championship with Samoa Joe as the special outside enforcer
17	WWE: Raw; SmackDown; ECW	No Way Out	Las Vegas, Nevada	Triple H defeated Jeff Hardy, Shawn Michaels, Chris Jericho, Umaga, and John "Bradshaw" Layfield in the Elimination Chamber match for a WWE Championship match at WrestleMania XXIV
(c) – denotes defending champion(s)

=== March ===
Date	Promotion(s)	Event	Location	Main event	Notes
9	TNA	Destination X	Norfolk, Virginia	The Unlikely Alliance (Christian Cage, Kevin Nash and Samoa Joe) defeated The Angle Alliance (Kurt Angle, A.J. Styles and Tomko) in a Six-man Tag team match	
16	AAA	Rey de Reyes	Monterrey, Mexico	Rey de Reyes Finals Elimination match	
16	ROH	Take No Prisoners	Philadelphia, Pennsylvania	Nigel McGuiness (c) defeated Tyler Black in a Singles match to retain the ROH World Championship	
30	WWE: Raw; SmackDown; ECW	WrestleMania XXIV	Orlando, Florida	The Undertaker defeated Edge (c) by submission in a Singles match to win the World Heavyweight Championship	Ric Flair wrestled his last WWE match at this PPV against Shawn Michaels
(c) – denotes defending champion(s)

=== April ===
Date	Promotion(s)	Event	Location	Main event
13	TNA	Lockdown	Lowell, Massachusetts	Samoa Joe defeated Kurt Angle (c) in a Six Sides of Steel Cage match to win TNA World Heavyweight Championship. If Joe had lost, he had to retire from professional wrestling.
18	CMLL	52. Aniversario de Arena México	Mexico City, Mexico	Héctor Garza and Místico (c) drew with Los Perros del Mal (Averno and Mephisto) - Double disqualification in a Best two-out-of-three falls tag team match for the CMLL World Tag Team Championship
27	WWE: Raw; SmackDown; ECW	Backlash	Baltimore, Maryland	Triple H defeated Randy Orton (c), John Cena, and John "Bradshaw" Layfield in a Fatal-4-Way elimination match to win the WWE Championship
(c) – denotes defending champion(s)

=== May ===
Date	Promotion(s)	Event	Location	Main event
11	TNA	Sacrifice	Orlando, Florida	Samoa Joe (c) defeated Kaz and Scott Steiner in a Three-way match to retain the TNA World Heavyweight Championship
18	WWE: Raw; SmackDown; ECW	Judgment Day	Omaha, Nebraska	Triple H (c) defeated Randy Orton in a Steel Cage match to retain the WWE Championship
(c) – denotes defending champion(s)

=== June ===
Date	Promotion(s)	Event	Location	Main event
1	WWE: Raw; SmackDown; ECW	One Night Stand	San Diego, California	Edge defeated The Undertaker in the Tables, Ladders, and Chairs match to win the vacant World Heavyweight Championship
7	ROH	Respect is Earned	Philadelphia, Pennsylvania	The Age of the Fall (Jimmy Jacobs and Tyler Black) (c) defeated TeamWork (Austin Aries and Bryan Danielson) in a Tag team match to retain the ROH World Tag Team Championship
8	TNA	Slammiversary	Southaven, Mississippi	Samoa Joe (c) defeated Booker T, Christian Cage, Rhino and Robert Roode in the King of the Mountain match to retain the TNA World Heavyweight Championship with Kevin Nash as special guest enforcer
13	AAA	Triplemanía XVI	Naucalpan, Mexico	Cibernético (c) defeated El Zorro in a Singles match for the AAA Mega Championship
13	CMLL	Infierno en el Ring	Mexico City, Mexico	10-man Infierno en el Ring, Lucha de Apuesta hair vs. hair Steel cage match
29	WWE: Raw; SmackDown; ECW	Night of Champions	Dallas, Texas	Triple H (c) defeated John Cena in a Singles match to retain the WWE Championship
(c) – denotes defending champion(s)

=== July ===
Date	Promotion(s)	Event	Location	Main event	Notes
13	TNA	Victory Road	Houston, Texas	Samoa Joe (c) vs Booker T went to a no contest in a Singles match for the TNA World Heavyweight Championship	
19	WWC	35th WWC Aniversario	San Juan, Puerto Rico	Ray Gonzalez defeated Carlito	
20	WWE: Raw; SmackDown; ECW	The Great American Bash	Uniondale, New York	Triple H (c) defeated Edge in a Singles match to retain the WWE Championship	This PPV is notable for being the last TV-14 rated WWE PPV. Immediately after the PPV, WWE turned their product PG; The event also determined the inaugural champion for the Diva Championship, new title for the SmackDown Divas, where Michelle McCool defeated Natalya.
25	CMLL	International Gran Prix	Mexico City, Mexico	Místico defeated Perro Aguayo Jr. (2-1) in a Best two-out-of-three-falls match, 2008 Leyenda de Plata tournament final	
26	ROH	New Horizons	Detroit, Michigan	Bryan Danielson defeated Tyler Black in a Singles match	
28	WWE: Raw; SmackDown; ECW	Saturday Night's Main Event XXXVI	Washington, D.C.	Edge defeated Jeff Hardy in a Singles match	note that this aired in the United States on NBC on August 2.
(c) – denotes defending champion(s)

=== August ===
Date	Promotion(s)	Event	Location	Main event
10	JCW	Bloodymania II	Cave-In-Rock, Illinois	Corporal Robinson (c) defeated Raven for the JCW World Heavyweight Championship
10	TNA	Hard Justice	Trenton, New Jersey	Samoa Joe (c) defeated Booker T in the Six Sides of Steel Weapons match to retain the TNA World Heavyweight Championship
9-17	NJPW	G1 Climax final	Tokyo	Hirooki Goto defeated Togi Makabe in a G1 Climax tournament
17	WWE: Raw; SmackDown; ECW	SummerSlam	Indianapolis, Indiana	The Undertaker defeated Edge in a Hell in a Cell match
29	CMLL	Sin Piedad	Mexico City	Blue Panther, Dos Caras Jr. and Dr. Wagner Jr. defeated Black Warrior, Mr. Niebla and Rey Bucanero in a Best two-out-of-three falls six-man "Lucha Libre rules" tag team match
(c) – denotes defending champion(s)

=== September ===
Date	Promotion(s)	Event	Location	Main event
4	GCW	Fifth Annual Fred Ward Memorial Show	Phenix City, Alabama	Micah Taylor and Diane Hewes defeated Johnny Swinger and Quentin Michaels in an All or Nothing match for control of GCW
7	WWE: Raw; SmackDown; ECW	Unforgiven	Cleveland, Ohio	Chris Jericho defeated Batista, Kane, John "Bradshaw" Layfield and Rey Mysterio in the Championship Scramble to win the vacant World Heavyweight Championship
14	AAA	Verano de Escándalo	Zapopan, Mexico	Vampiro defeated El Mesías in Steel cage "street fight" match
14	TNA	No Surrender	Oshawa, Ontario	Samoa Joe (c) defeated Christian Cage and Kurt Angle in the Three Ways to Glory match to retain the TNA World Heavyweight Championship
19	ROH	Driven	Boston, Massachusetts	Kevin Steen and El Generico defeated The Age of the Fall (Jimmy Jacobs and Tyler Black) (c) in a Tag team match to win the ROH World Tag Team Championship
19	CMLL	CMLL 75th Anniversary Show	Mexico City, Mexico	Villano V defeated Blue Panther in a Lucha de Apuestas mask vs. mask match
(c) – denotes defending champion(s)

=== October ===
Date	Promotion(s)	Event	Location	Main event
5	WWE: Raw; SmackDown; ECW	No Mercy	Portland, Oregon	Chris Jericho (c) defeated Shawn Michaels in the Ladder match to retain the World Heavyweight Championship
12	TNA	Bound for Glory	Hoffman Estates, Illinois	Sting defeated Samoa Joe (c) in a Singles match to win the TNA World Heavyweight Championship
13	NJPW	Destruction	Tokyo	Keiji Mutoh (c) defeated Shinsuke Nakamura in a Singles match to retain the IWGP Heavyweight Championship
24	AAA	Antonio Peña Memorial Show	Veracruz, Mexico	La Legión Extranjera (Electroshock, Konnan, Rellik and Kenzo Suzuki) defeated Team AAA (Latin Lover, Octagón, La Parka and Super Fly) in a steel cage elimination match
26	WWE: Raw; SmackDown; ECW	Cyber Sunday	Phoenix, Arizona	Batista defeated Chris Jericho (c) in a Singles match to win the World Heavyweight Championship with Stone Cold Steve Austin as special guest referee.
(c) – denotes defending champion(s)

=== November ===
Date	Promotion(s)	Event	Location	Main event
1-2	PWG	Battle of Los Angeles	Burbank, California	Low Ki defeated Chris Hero in a Battle of Los Angeles tournament
9	TNA	Turning Point	Orlando	Sting (c) defeated A.J. Styles in a Singles match to retain the TNA World Heavyweight Championship
14	N/A	Second Annual Sensational Sherri Memorial Cup Tournament	Montreal, Quebec	Misty Haven and Michael Von Payton defeated Kacey Diamond and Marko Estrada in a Tournament Finals match
22	ROH	Rising Above	Chicago Ridge, Illinois	Nigel McGuinness (c) defeated Bryan Danielson in a Singles match to retain the ROH World Championship
23	WWE: Raw; SmackDown; ECW	Survivor Series	Boston, Massachusetts	John Cena defeated Chris Jericho (c) in a Singles match to win the World Heavyweight Championship
(c) – denotes defending champion(s)

=== December ===
Date	Promotion(s)	Event	Location	Main event
5	WWE: Raw; SmackDown; ECW	Tribute to the Troops	Baghdad	John Cena, Batista and Rey Mysterio defeated Randy Orton, Chris Jericho and Big Show in a Six-man tag team match
6	AAA	Guerra de Titanes	Orizaba, Mexico	Steel Cage Match Luchas de Apuestas
7	TNA	Final Resolution	Orlando	The Main Event Mafia (Sting (c), Kevin Nash, Scott Steiner and Booker T) defeated The TNA Front Line (A.J. Styles, Samoa Joe, Brother Ray and Brother Devon) in an Eight-man tag team match to retain the TNA World Heavyweight Championship
14	WWE: Raw; SmackDown; ECW	Armageddon	Buffalo, New York	Jeff Hardy defeated Edge (c) and Triple H in a Triple threat match to win the WWE Championship
(c) – denotes defending champion(s)

== Accomplishments and tournaments ==
=== AAA ===
Accomplishment	Winner	Date won	Notes
Rey de Reyes	El Zorro	March 16	

==== AAA Hall of Fame ====
Inductee
Eddie Guerrero

=== Ring of Honor ===
Accomplishment	Winner	Date won	Notes
ROH World Championship #1 Contender Tournament	Kevin Steen	February 22	
ROH World Championship #1 Contender Tournament	Tyler Black	March 16	
ROH World Tag Team Championship Tournament	The Age of the Fall (Tyler Black and Jimmy Jacobs)	June 6	

=== Sendai Girls ===
Accomplishment	Winner	Date won	Notes
Jaja Uma Tournament	Hiroyo Matsumoto	June 27	

=== TNA ===
Accomplishment	Winner	Date won	Notes
Deuces Wild Tag Team Tournament	The Latin American Xchange (Hernandez and Homicide)	May 11	
2008 TNA World X Cup Tournament	Team Mexico	July 13	
Turkey Bowl	Rhino	November 27	

=== WWE ===
Accomplishment	Winner	Date won	Notes
Royal Rumble	John Cena	January 27	Winner received their choice of a championship match for either Raw's WWE Championship, SmackDown's World Heavyweight Championship, or the ECW Championship at WrestleMania XXIV; Cena last eliminated Triple H to win but instead of waiting until WrestleMania, Cena used his championship opportunity to challenge Randy Orton for his own brand's WWE Championship at No Way Out. Cena did not win the championship at No Way Out, but still ended up being in the WWE Championship match at WrestleMania but was also unsuccessful there where Orton retained over Cena and Triple H in a triple threat match.
Money in the Bank ladder match	CM Punk	March 30	Defeated Carlito, Chris Jericho, John Morrison, Mr. Kennedy, Montel Vontavious Porter, and Shelton Benjamin to win a world championship match contract. Punk from Raw cashed in his contract and won SmackDown's World Heavyweight Championship from Edge on the June 30 episode of Raw after Edge had just received a beat down from Batista. The World Heavyweight Championship was transferred to Raw upon Punk's win.
King of the Ring	William Regal	April 21	Defeated CM Punk in the tournament final to win and be crowned King of the Ring.
Championship Chase Tournament	Edge	May 9	Last eliminated Batista to win a battle royal, which was a tournament final to determine The Undertaker's challenger for the vacant World Heavyweight Championship at Judgment Day; Undertaker had been stripped of the title for using a banned submission hold, Hell's Gate, on Edge in their match at Backlash. The match at Judgment Day, however, ended in a countout victory for Undertaker. The two faced each other again for the vacant title at One Night Stand where Edge defeated Undertaker to win the title.
WWE Intercontinental Championship #1 Contender's Tournament	CM Punk	December 14	Defeated Rey Mysterio in the tournament final to win an Intercontinental Championship match, which Punk received on the January 5, 2009 episode of Raw, but failed to win the title due to William Regal getting himself counted out. Punk gained the title in a rematch two weeks later that was contested under no disqualification rules.
Race To The Rumble Tournament	John "Bradshaw" Layfield	December 29	Defeated Shawn Michaels, Randy Orton, and Chris Jericho in a fatal four-way match, which was the final of a tournament to determine the number one contender for the World Heavyweight Championship at the 2009 Royal Rumble. JBL, however, was unsuccessful against John Cena at the event.

==== WWE Hall of Fame ====
Category	Inductee	Inducted by
Individual	"Nature Boy" Ric Flair	Triple H
Individual	"High Chief" Peter Maivia	The Rock
Individual	"Soulman" Rocky Johnson	The Rock
Individual	Mae Young	Pat Patterson
Individual	Eddie Graham	Dusty Rhodes
Individual	Gordon Solie	Jim Ross
Group	The Brisco Brothers (Jack Brisco and Gerald Brisco)	John "Bradshaw" Layfield

==== Slammy Awards ====
Poll	Results
Best WWE.com Exclusive	John Morrison and The Miz present "The Dirt Sheet"
Breakout Star of the Year	Vladimir Kozlov
Best Musical Performance	R-Truth – "What's Up?" (SmackDown, Sept 15)
Announce Team of the Year	Todd Grisham and Matt Striker (ECW)
Best Impersonation	Charlie Haas as "The GlamaHaas" (Raw, Oct 27)
Tag Team of the Year	John Morrison and The Miz
Finishing Maneuver of the Year	Air Bourne (Evan Bourne)
Extreme Moment of the Year	Jeff Hardy gives Randy Orton the Swanton Bomb from the top of the Raw set (Raw, January 14)
Couple of the Year	Edge and Vickie Guerrero
Diva of the Year	Beth Phoenix
"OMG!" Moment of the Year	CM Punk cashes in Money in the Bank briefcase and defeats Edge for the World Heavyweight Championship on the June 30 edition of Raw
Match of the Year	Ric Flair vs. Shawn Michaels – WrestleMania XXIV
"Damn!" Moment of the Year	The Great Khali hosts the Kiss Cam (SmackDown, November 7)
Superstar of the Year	Chris Jericho

== Title changes ==
=== AAA ===
AAA Mega Championship
Incoming champion – El Mesias
Date	Winner	Event/Show	Note(s)
March 16	Cibernético	Rey de Reyes	
October 24	Vacated	Antonio Peña Memorial Show	
December 6	El Mesias	Guerra de Titanes	

AAA World Mini-Estrella Championship
(Title created)
Date	Winner	Event/Show	Note(s)
September 14	Mini Charly Manson	Verano de Escándalo	

AAA World Tag Team Championship
Incoming champions – Mexican Powers (Crazy Boy and Joe Líder)
Date	Winner	Event/Show	Note(s)
April 27	La Familia de Tijuana (Halloween and Extreme Tiger)	AAA Sin Límite TV Taping	
September 14	La Hermandad 187 (Joe Líder and Nicho el Millonario)	Verano de Escándalo	

AAA World Mixed Tag Team Championship
Incoming champions – Gran Apache and Mari Apache
Date	Winner	Event/Show	Note(s)
September 14	Cynthia Moreno and El Oriental	Verano de Escándalo	

=== NJPW ===
IWGP Heavyweight Championship
Incoming champion – Hiroshi Tanahashi
Date	Winner	Event/Show	Note(s)
January 4	Shinsuke Nakamura	Wrestle Kingdom II in Tokyo Dome	
April 27	Keiji Mutoh	Circuit2008 New Japan Brave tour	

IWGP Tag Team Championship
Incoming champions – RISE (Giant Bernard and Travis Tomko)
Date	Winner	Event/Show	Note(s)
February 17	The Most Violent Players (Togi Makabe and Toru Yano)	Circuit 2008 New Japan Ism	

IWGP Junior Heavyweight Championship
Incoming champion – Wataru Inoue
Date	Winner	Event/Show	Note(s)
June 16	Vacated	N/A	
July 8	Tiger Mask	New Japan Trill	
September 21	Low Ki	New Japan Generation	

IWGP Junior Heavyweight Tag Team Championship
Incoming champions – Dick Togo and Taka Michinoku
Date	Winner	Event/Show	Note(s)
January 27	Prince Prince (Minoru and Prince Devitt)	Circuit 2008 New Japan Ism	
February 17	Legend (Akira and Jushin Thunder Liger)	Circuit 2008 New Japan Ism	
July 21	Prince Prince (Minoru and Prince Devitt)	Circuit2008 New Japan Soul: Novello Sparks	
October 13	No Limit (Tetsuya Naito and Yujiro Takahashi)	Destruction '08	

=== ROH ===
ROH World Championship
Incoming champion – Nigel McGuinness
Date	Winner	Event/Show	Note(s)
No title changes

ROH World Tag Team Championship
Incoming champion(s) – The Age of the Fall (Jimmy Jacobs and Tyler Black)
Date	Winner	Event/Show	Note(s)
January 26	No Remorse Corps (Davey Richards and Rocky Romero)	Without Remorse	
April 12	The Briscoe Brothers (Jay and Mark Briscoe)	Injustice	
May 10	Vacated	A New Level	
June 6	The Age of the Fall (Jimmy Jacobs and Tyler Black)	Up for Grabs	
September 19	El Generico and Kevin Steen	Driven	

=== TNA ===
TNA World Heavyweight Championship
Incoming champion – Kurt Angle
Date	Winner	Event/Show	Note(s)
April 13	Samoa Joe	Lockdown	This was a six sides of steel cage title vs. career match
October 12	Sting	Bound for Glory	This was a match, where the loser can't get a rematch

TNA X Division Championship
Incoming champion – Jay Lethal
Date	Winner	Event/Show	Note(s)
January 21	Johnny Devine	Impact!	
February 10	Jay Lethal	Against All Odds	
April 15	Petey Williams	Impact!	
September 14	Sheik Abdul Bashir	No Surrender	
December 7	Eric Young	Final Resolution	
December 7	Vacated	Final Resolution	

TNA World Beer Drinking Championship
Incoming champion – Eric Young
Unsanctioned championship
Date	Winner	Event/Show	Note(s)
February 25	James Storm	Impact!	
February 26	Deactivated	Impact!	

TNA World Tag Team Championship
Incoming champions – Christian's Coalition (A.J. Styles and Tomko)
Date	Winner	Event/Show	Note(s)
April 15	Kaz and Eric Young/Super Eric	Impact!	
April 15	Vacated	Impact!	
May 11	The Latin American Xchange (Homicide and Hernandez)	Sacrifice	
August 10	Beer Money, Inc. (James Storm and Robert Roode)	Hard Justice	
December 16	Jay Lethal and Consequences Creed	Impact!	

TNA Women's World Championship
Incoming champion – Gail Kim
Date	Winner	Event/Show	Note(s)
January 7	Awesome Kong	Impact!	
June 24	Taylor Wilde	Impact!	
October 23	Awesome Kong	Impact!	

TNA Television Championship
(Title created)
Date	Winner	Event/Show	Note(s)
October 23	Booker T	Impact!	

=== WWE ===
– Raw
– SmackDown
- ECW

Raw and SmackDown each had a world championship, a secondary championship, a women's championship, and a male tag team championship. ECW only had a world championship.

WWE Championship
Incoming champion – Randy Orton
Date	Winner	Event/Show	Note(s)
April 27	Triple H	Backlash	Fatal four-way elimination match, also involving John Cena and John "Bradshaw" Layfield.
The title became exclusive to the SmackDown brand following the 2008 WWE draft when Triple H was drafted to SmackDown.
November 23	Edge	Survivor Series	Triple threat match, also involving Vladimir Kozlov. Jeff Hardy had originally been scheduled to take part in the match, but did not participate after being (in storyline) attacked prior to the event. Triple H and Kozlov started the match before Edge was revealed as Hardy's surprise replacement.
December 14	Jeff Hardy	Armageddon	Triple threat match, also involving Triple H.

World Heavyweight Championship
Incoming champion – Edge
Date	Winner	Event/Show	Note(s)
March 30	The Undertaker	WrestleMania XXIV	
April 29 (aired May 2)	Vacated	SmackDown	SmackDown General Manager Vickie Guerrero stripped The Undertaker of the title for using the Hell's Gate submission hold, which she deemed to be dangerous.
June 1	Edge	One Night Stand	Defeated The Undertaker in a Tables, Ladders, and Chairs match to win the vacant title. Per the pre-match stipulation, Undertaker was (kayfabe) banished from WWE.
June 30	CM Punk	Monday Night Raw	Cashed in his Money in the Bank contract
The title became exclusive to the Raw brand due to CM Punk being a member of the Raw roster.
September 7	Chris Jericho	Unforgiven	Championship Scramble, also involving John "Bradshaw" Layfield, Batista, Rey Mysterio, and Kane. Jericho was a late replacement for champion CM Punk, who was attacked by The Legacy prior to the match.
October 26	Batista	Cyber Sunday	Stone Cold Steve Austin was the special guest referee.
November 3	Chris Jericho	Monday Night Raw	Steel cage match
November 23	John Cena	Survivor Series	

ECW Championship
Incoming champion – CM Punk
Date	Winner	Event/Show	Note(s)
January 22	Chavo Guerrero Jr.	ECW	No Disqualification match.
The title became shared between the SmackDown and ECW brands due to Chavo Guerrero Jr. being a member of the SmackDown roster.
March 30	Kane	WrestleMania XXIV	
The title became exclusive to the SmackDown brand due to Kane being a member of the SmackDown roster.
The title became exclusive to the ECW brand when Kane became a member of the ECW roster two days after WrestleMania XXIV.
The title became exclusive to the Raw brand following the 2008 WWE draft when Kane was drafted to Raw.
June 29	Mark Henry	Night of Champions	Triple threat match, also involving SmackDown's Big Show.
The title became exclusive to the ECW brand due to Mark Henry being a member of the ECW roster.
September 7	Matt Hardy	Unforgiven	Scramble match, also involving Finlay, The Miz, and Chavo Guerrero Jr.

WWE Intercontinental Championship
Incoming champion – Jeff Hardy
Date	Winner	Event/Show	Note(s)
March 10	Chris Jericho	Monday Night Raw	No disqualification match
June 29	Kofi Kingston	Night of Champions	
August 17	Santino Marella	SummerSlam	Winner Takes All Intergender tag team match in which both the Intercontinental and Women's Championships were on the line. Beth Phoenix teamed with Marella. The title was won when Phoenix pinned Mickie James, whose partner was Kofi Kingston.
November 10	William Regal	Monday Night Raw	

WWE United States Championship
Incoming champion – Montel Vontavious Porter
Date	Winner	Event/Show	Note(s)
April 27 (aired March 20)	Matt Hardy	Backlash	
The title became exclusive to the ECW brand following the 2008 WWE draft when Matt Hardy was drafted to ECW.
July 20	Shelton Benjamin	The Great American Bash	
The title became exclusive to the SmackDown brand due to Shelton Benjamin being a member of the SmackDown roster.

WWE Women's Championship
Incoming champion – Beth Phoenix
Date	Winner	Event/Show	Note(s)
April 14	Mickie James	Monday Night Raw	
August 17	Beth Phoenix	SummerSlam	Winner Takes All Intergender tag team match in which both the Women's and Intercontinental Championships were on the line. Phoenix teamed with Santino Marella. The title was won when Phoenix pinned Mickie James, whose partner was Kofi Kingston.

WWE Divas Championship
(Title created)
Date	Winner	Event/Show	Note(s)
July 20	Michelle McCool	The Great American Bash	Defeated Natalya to become the inaugural champion.
December 22 (aired December 26)	Maryse	SmackDown	Maria served as the special guest referee.

World Tag Team Championship
Incoming champions – Hardcore Holly and Cody Rhodes
Date	Winner	Event/Show	Note(s)
June 29	The Legacy (Ted DiBiase Jr. and Cody Rhodes)	Night of Champions	Rhodes was revealed to be DiBiase's mystery partner and turned on Hardcore Holly, resulting in a handicap match.
August 4	Batista and John Cena	Monday Night Raw	
August 11	The Legacy (Ted DiBiase Jr. and Cody Rhodes)	Monday Night Raw	
October 27	CM Punk and Kofi Kingston	Monday Night Raw	
December 13	John Morrison and The Miz	House show	

WWE Tag Team Championship
Incoming champions – John Morrison and The Miz
Date	Winner	Event/Show	Note(s)
July 20	Curt Hawkins and Zack Ryder	The Great American Bash	Fatal four-way tag team match, also involving Jesse and Festus and Finlay and Hornswoggle.
The title transferred to SmackDown due to Curt Hawkins and Zack Ryder being members of the SmackDown roster.
September 21 (aired September 26)	The Colóns (Carlito and Primo)	SmackDown	

== Awards and honors ==
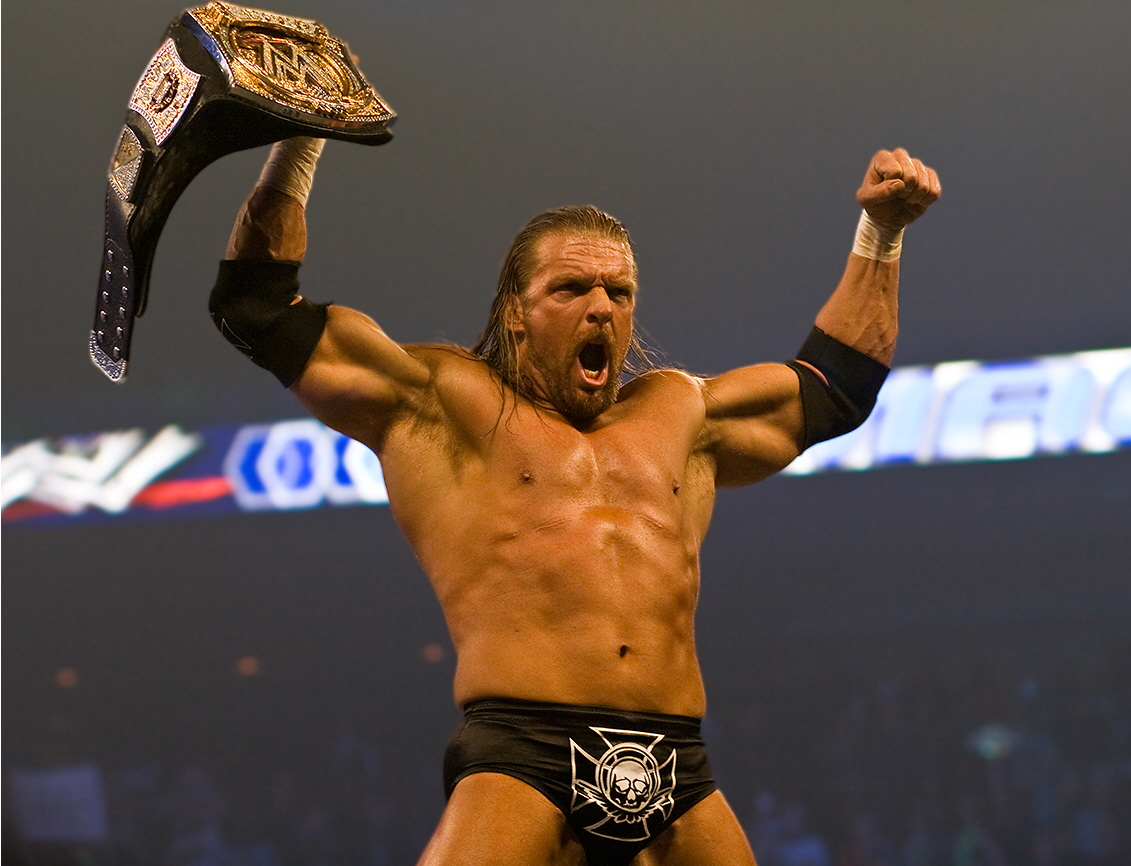
2008 PWI Wrestler of the Year, Triple H

=== Pro Wrestling Illustrated ===
Category	Winner
PWI Wrestler of the Year	Triple H
PWI Tag Team of the Year	Beer Money, Inc. (Robert Roode and James Storm)
PWI Match of the Year	Shawn Michaels vs. Ric Flair (WrestleMania XXIV)
PWI Feud of the Year	Chris Jericho vs. Shawn Michaels
PWI Most Popular Wrestler of the Year	Jeff Hardy
PWI Most Hated Wrestler of the Year	Chris Jericho
PWI Comeback of the Year	Chris Jericho
PWI Most Improved Wrestler of the Year	Cody Rhodes
PWI Most Inspirational Wrestler of the Year	Ric Flair
PWI Rookie of the Year	Joe Hennig
PWI Woman of the Year	Awesome Kong
PWI Lifetime Achievement	Ric Flair

=== Wrestling Observer Newsletter ===
==== Wrestling Observer Newsletter Hall of Fame ====
Inductee
Paco Alonso
Martín Karadagian

==== Wrestling Observer Newsletter awards ====
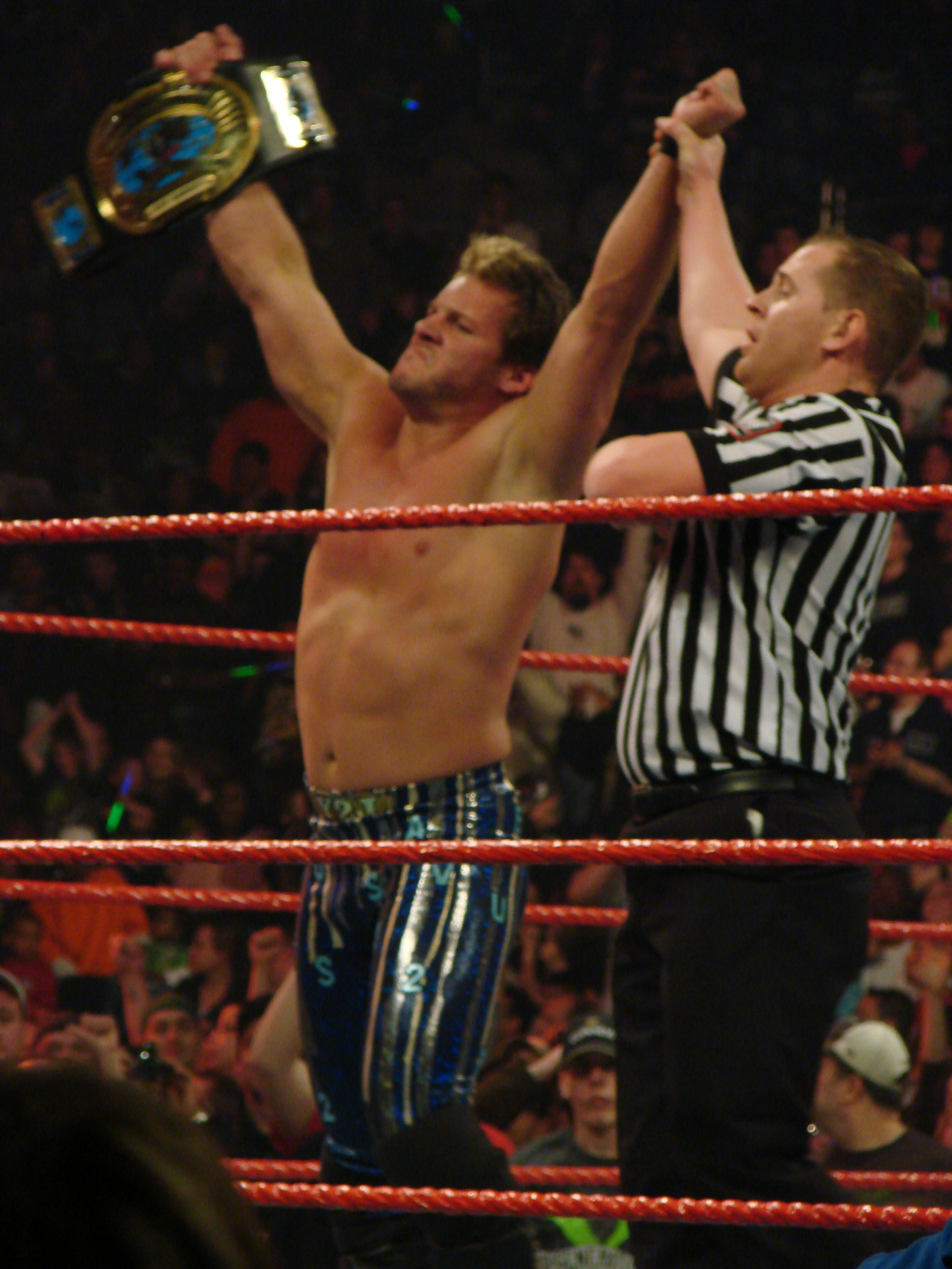
2008 Wrestling Observer Newsletter Wrestler of the Year, Chris Jericho

Category	Winner
Wrestler of the Year	Chris Jericho
Most Outstanding	Bryan Danielson
Feud of the Year	Chris Jericho vs. Shawn Michaels
Tag Team of the Year	John Morrison and The Miz
Most Improved	The Miz
Best on Interviews	Chris Jericho

== Births ==
- March 28 – Haru Kazashiro
- August 29 – Daichi Sato

== Debuts ==
- January 3 – Ryuichi Sekine
- February 11 – Takashi Okita (Kensuke Office)
- March 2 – Kenoh
- March 7 – Matt Taven
- March 11 – Shinya Ishikawa
- April 12 – Hamuko Hoshi
- April 19 – Shota
- April 26 – Adam Cole
- May 24 – Adam Page
- June 27 – Yuji Okabayashi
- July 13 – Nozomi Dai (NEO)
- July 20 – Hikaru Shida
- September 19 – Bayley
- September 20 – Nikki Cross
- October 26
  - Shane Mercer
  - Syuri
- November 11 – Yumehito Imanari
- November 15 – Bo Dallas
- November 22 – Rusev
- December 4 – Ryuichi Kawakami

== Retirements ==
- Roadkill (1996 – February 4, 2008) (brief return only in 2012)
- Billy Kidman (September 11, 1994 – February 23, 2008)
- Woody Farmer (1960s-April 12, 2008)
- Torrie Wilson (February 21, 1999 – May 8, 2008) (brief return only in 2009 and 2018)
- Jonathan Coachman (December 23, 1999 – June 2008)
- Danny Basham (1998–July 5, 2008)
- Ashley Massaro (June 27, 2005 – July 9, 2008)
- Carlos Colón (February 16, 1966 – July 19, 2008)
- Johnny Jeter (September 2001 – August 2008) (brief return only in 2014)
- Cherry (January 1999 – August 15, 2008)
- Sonny Siaki (March 1998 – September 17, 2008)
- Joey Mercury (October 12, 1996 – October 2008) (returned to wrestling from 2010 onwards)
- Peter Thornley (1964-October 29, 2008)
- KC James (December 15, 2001 – December 12, 2008)
- Misae Genki (August 28, 1994 – December 31, 2008)

== Deaths ==
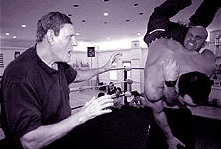
Killer Kowalski

- January 17 - Ernie Holmes, 59
- February 6 - Elephant Boy, 86
- February 15 – Johnny Weaver, 72
- March 6 – Don Curtis, 80
- March 16 – Gary Hart, 66
- March 20 – Bestia Salvaje, 46
- March 23
  - Chase Tatum, 34
  - Luis Magana, 97
- March 28 – Ron Slinker, 62
- April 5 - Buffalo Jim Barrier, 55
- April 30 - Yvon Robert Jr., 65
- May 11 – Judy Grable, 72
- May 12 – Penny Banner, 73
- May 25 – Rudy Kay, 65
- June 17 – Jimmy Jackson (wrestler), 51
- June 19 – Chief White Owl, 72
- July 12 - Evgeny Artyukhin Sr., 59
- July 30 – Alfonso Dantés, 65
- August 20 - Sonny Fargo, 80
- August 30 – Killer Kowalski, 81
- September 20 - George Larson, 93
- September 21 - Al Hobman, 83
- October 8 - Hogan Wharton, 72
- October 16 – Jack Reynolds, 71
- October 19 – Lia Maivia, 81
- October 26 – S. D. Jones, 63
- December 4 – Steve Bradley, 32
- December 14 – Mike Bell, 37

== See also ==
- List of NJPW pay-per-view events
- List of ROH pay-per-view events
- List of TNA pay-per-view events
- List of WWE pay-per-view events
