= Respect is Earned II =

Respect Is Earned II
- Promotional poster featuring Austin Aries and Bryan Danielson
- Promotion: Ring of Honor
- Date: June 7, 2008 (aired August 1, 2008)
- City: Philadelphia, Pennsylvania
- Venue: Pennsylvania National Guard Armory
- Attendance: 600

Pay-per-view chronology
| ← Previous; Take No Prisoners | Next → New Horizons |

Respect is Earned chronology
| ← Previous; 2007 | Next → — |

Respect Is Earned II was a professional wrestling pay-per-view (PPV) event produced by Ring of Honor (ROH). It took place on June 7, 2008 from the Pennsylvania National Guard Armory in Philadelphia, Pennsylvania. It did not, however, air on pay-per-view until August 1.

== Storylines ==
Other on-screen personnel
| Role | Name |
|---|---|
| Commentators | Dave Prazak |
| Commentators | Lenny Leonard |

Respect is Earned II featured storylines and professional wrestling matches that involved different wrestlers from pre-existing scripted feuds and storylines. Storylines were produced on ROH's weekly television programme Ring of Honor Wrestling.

== Results ==
| No. | Results | Stipulations | Times |
|---|---|---|---|
| 1^{D} | Mitch Franklin and Shane Hagadorn defeated The Osirian Portal (Ophidian and Amasis) | Tag team match | — |
| 2^{D} | Rhett Titus defeated Ernie Osiris (c) | Singles match for the ROH Top of the Class Trophy Championship | — |
| 3 | Kevin Steen and El Generico defeated The Vulture Squad (Ruckus and Jigsaw) | Tag team match | 8:05 |
| 4 | Claudio Castagnoli defeated Davey Richards | Singles match | 9:15 |
| 5 | Brent Albright, Delirious and Pelle Primeau (with Daizee Haze) defeated Sweet & Sour Inc. (Chris Hero, Adam Pearce and Eddie Edwards) (with Larry Sweeney, Sara Del Rey, Bobby Dempsey and Shane Hagadorn) | Six-man tag team match | 11:21 |
| 6 | Roderick Strong defeated Erick Stevens | Fight Without Honor | 20:54 |
| 7 | Nigel McGuinness (c) defeated Go Shiozaki by submission | Singles match for the ROH World Championship | 17:00 |
| 8 | The Age of the Fall (Jimmy Jacobs and Tyler Black) (c) defeated Austin Aries and Bryan Danielson | Tag team match for the ROH World Tag Team Championship | 23:45 |
| 9^{D} | Jigsaw defeated Eddie Kingston (with Sabian and Robbie Mireno) | Singles match | 10:29 |
| 10^{D} | Necro Butcher defeated Jay Briscoe | Philadelphia street fight | 23:30 |
(c) / – the champion(s) heading into the match; D / – this was a dark match

== See also ==
- 2008 in professional wrestling
- List of Ring of Honor pay-per-view events
