= McGuckin =

McGuckin is an Irish surname. Notable people with the surname include:

- Aislin McGuckin (born 1974), Northern Irish actress
- Barton McGuckin (1852–1913), Irish tenor singer
- Ed McGuckin (born 1983), known professionally as Jigsaw, American professional wrestler
- Genevieve McGuckin (fl. 1980–2011), Australian musician and songwriter
- Gregory P. McGuckin (born 1961), American lawyer and Republican member of the New Jersey General Assembly
- John Anthony McGuckin (born 1952), British Orthodox Christian scholar, priest, and poet
- Kevin McGuckin (born 1981), Gaelic footballer
- Kieran McGuckin (born 1967), Irish hurler
- Mark McGuckin (fl. 2004–2016), Canadian television presenter
- William McGuckin de Slane (1801–1878), Irish orientalist

== See also ==
- McGuckian
- McGuigan
