= McGuigan =

McGuigan is a Gaelic surname of Irish origin. Notable people with the surname include:

- Andy McGuigan (1878–1948), Scottish soccer player
- Barry McGuigan (born 1961), British/Irish boxer and world Featherweight champion
  - Barry McGuigan World Championship Boxing, a licensed video game featuring him
- Brian McGuigan (born 1980), Irish Gaelic football player
- Doug McGuigan (born 1970), Scottish-South African golfer
- Eugene McGuigan, American athletic director of Duquesne University
- Frank McGuigan (1955–2026), Northern Irish Gaelic footballer
- Frank Joseph McGuigan (1924–1998), American psychologist
- Holly Maguigan (1945–2023), American lawyer
- J. Lorne McGuigan (born 1936), Canadian politician
- James McGuigan (1894–1974), Canadian prelate of the Roman Catholic Church
- Jim McGuigan (1923–1998), Canadian politician
- John McGuigan (1932–2004), Scottish footballer
- Paddy McGuigan (1939–2014), Irish musician
- Pat McGuigan (1935–1987), Irish singer
- Paul McGuigan (musician) (born 1971), English musician and founder member of Oasis
- Paul McGuigan (director) (born 1963), Scottish film director
- Philip McGuigan (born 1973), Irish politician
- Rupert McGuigan (born 1941), English Private Secretary to The Princess Royal
- Tom McGuigan (1921–2013), New Zealand politician
- Tommy McGuigan, Irish Gaelic football player
- William McGuigan (1853–1908), Canadian mayor of Vancouver, British Columbia
