= Take No Prisoners (2009) =

Professional wrestling event

- Promotional poster featuring Tyler Black and Jerry Lynn
- Promotion: Ring of Honor
- Date: April 4, 2009 (taped); June 12, 2009 (aired)
- City: Houston, Texas
- Venue: George R. Brown Convention Center
- Attendance: 2,700

Pay-per-view chronology
← Previous; Caged Collision	Next → Final Battle

Take No Prisoners chronology
← Previous; 2008	Next → Final

Take No Prisoners (2009) was the second Take No Prisoners professional wrestling pay-per-view (PPV) event produced by Ring of Honor. It took place on April 4, 2009 at the George R. Brown Convention Center in Houston, Texas, and aired on pay-per-view on June 12, 2009. There were seven matches that took place on the card.

== Storylines ==
One of the main feuds going into the show was between Tyler Black and Austin Aries, who had since been in an ongoing feud over the past year originating from Black's membership in the villainous faction, The Age of the Fall. As the protege of group leader, Jimmy Jacobs, Jacobs would use Black in his rivalry with Aries, which saw the two have numerous encounters until Jacobs turned on Black. This led to a brief truce between Black and Aries until Aries turned on Black, citing his disdain for the fans. Also feuding at the time were Japanese professional wrestlers Kenta, of Pro Wrestling Noah, and Katsuhiko Nakajima, of Kensuke Office. The two had been feuding in Japan over Noah's GHC Junior Heavyweight Championship, held at the time by Kenta. The four wrestlers were scheduled to compete in a tag team match with Black and Kenta facing Aries and Nakajima.

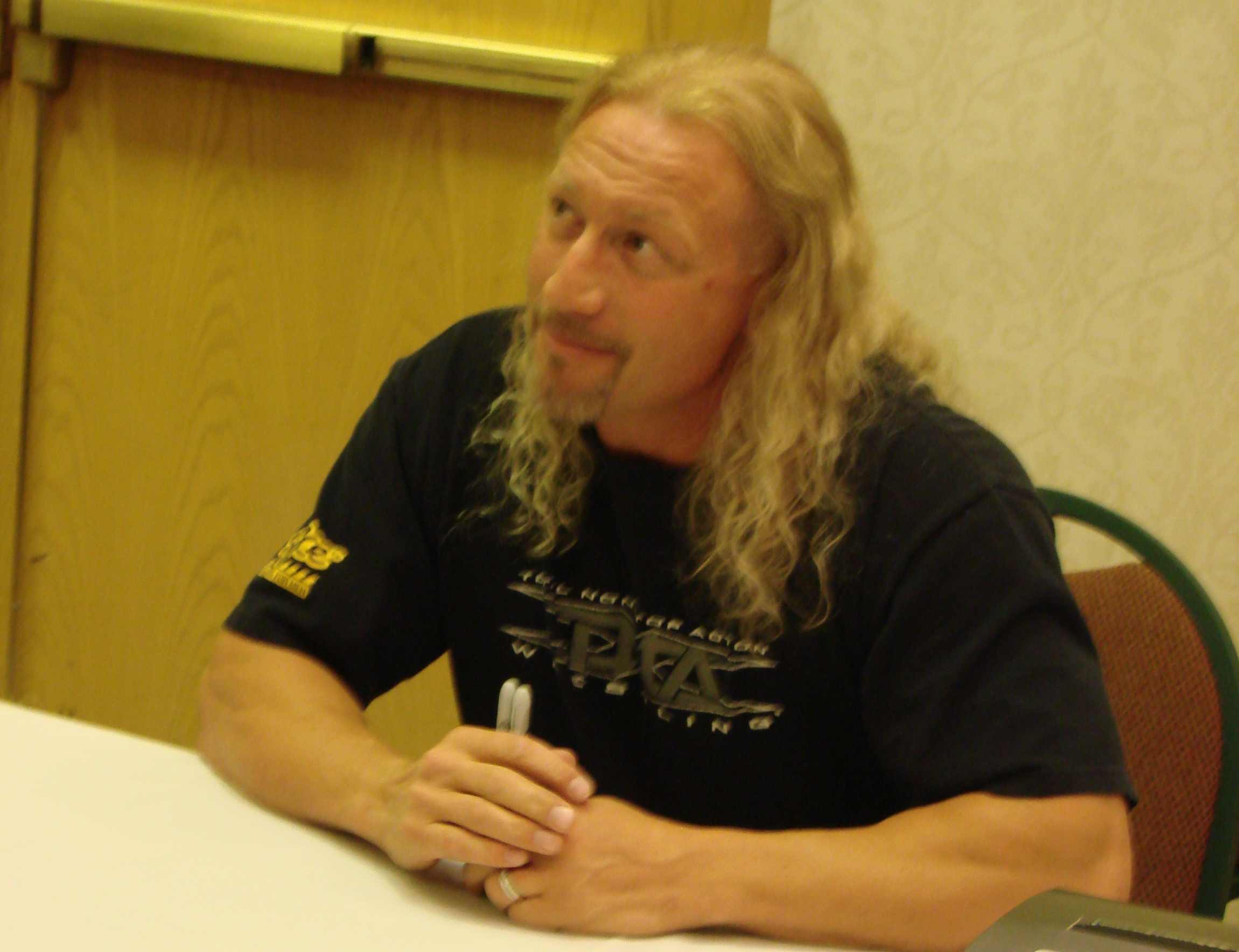
Jerry Lynn, ROH World Champion heading into Take No Prisoners

Brent Albright and Claudio Castagnoli recently had a series of matches that had a number of inconclusive decisions, with Albright not being content at winning a few by default. The two would plan to meet at Take No Prisoners in a tag team match choosing their own partners. Castagnoli chose frequent ally, then-ROH World Champion, Nigel McGuinness, while Albright chose the NWA World Heavyweight Champion, Blue Demon, Jr. It was later announced on the show that the tag match was changed to a triple threat between Albright, Castagnoli, and Demon; McGuinness withdrew from the match due to suffering a biceps tear weeks before and losing the ROH World Championship to Jerry Lynn the night before at Super Card of Honor IV.

The ROH World title would end up being defended at Take No Prisoners. As noted above, McGuinness lost the title the night prior to Jerry Lynn, who made a challenge to defend the title for the first time on the show in a Four Corner Survival match against Bryan Danielson, Erick Stevens, and D'Lo Brown.

Another major match going into the show is a No Disqualification match pitting Jimmy Jacobs against his former ally in The Age of the Fall, Necro Butcher. The feud began when Jacobs abused his authority over Necro during his time with The Age of the Fall, frustrating him to the point where he quit, to which Jacobs responded by having The Age of the Fall violently attack him on several occasions.

== Event ==
Other on-screen personnel
Commentators	Dave Prazak
Commentators	Lenny Leonard

=== Dark matches ===
Before and during the event, there were a series of untelevised matches for the live crowd in attendance. The first match was an exhibition between two of Ring of Honor's Wrestling Academy graduates- Ernie Osiris versus Grizzly Redwood (Mitch Franklin), which saw Osiris get the victory via pinfall after berating Redwood in the head with a log. The following match was also with students of the company in a six-man tag team match pitting Alex Payne, Bobby Dempsey, and Andy Ridge against Andy Duncan, Spiro, and Don Juan, which saw Dempsey pin Spiro following his finishing maneuver, the Death Valley driver. Following the first match on the card, there was another match for the crowd in attendance pitting Mike Dell and Shawn Vexx against Darin Childs and JT Lamotta, which JT Lamotta pinned Shawn Vexx for the victory. Also, an additional match featured Rhett Titus against veteran wrestler Luke Williams, which saw Titus get the victory by pinning Williams.

=== Preliminary matches ===
The show opened with a match between Colt Cabana and his original trainer and often tag team partner, Ace Steel. The match started with both wrestlers comedically inspecting the structural integrity of the top rope, which broke during a match the night prior, before starting their match eventually won by Cabana after making Steel submit to an inverted version of the Boston crab dubbed the Chicago Crab.

Succeeding the third dark match was an eight-man tag team match pitting the team of Kevin Steen, El Generico, Jay Briscoe, and guest-appearing from AAA, Magno, against Chris Hero, Davey Richards, Eddie Edwards of Sweet n' Sour Inc., and guest from AAA, Incognito. The match was kept at a fast pace and brawling that eventually ended by Briscoe catching Hero with a piledriver, driving his head to the mat, followed up by the former team scoring the victory.

Jimmy Jacobs would wrestle Necro Butcher next in a No-Disqualification match that quickly degenerated to a brawl on the floor area surrounding the ring before both wrestlers made their way into the crowd, which eventually had Jacobs pull out his signature railroad spike to use as a weapon against his opponent, cutting open his face. This would do little to phase Necro Butcher, as he would return to the ring area to place Jacobs onto the top turnbuckle before suplexing him off onto the floor of the arena. After some trading of shots with a steel chair, Necro Butcher punched his adversary in the face before executing a sit-down powerbomb to him to get the pinfall.

The following match was scheduled to be a tag team match pitting Nigel McGuinness and Claudio Castagnoli against Brent Albright and Blue Demon, Jr., but due to the aforementioned injury of McGuinness, the match became a triple threat match. The match started as a fight between Castagnoli and Demon with Demon throwing his opponent to the floor of the arena with a headscissors takedown over the top rope. As Albright made his way into the match, he attacked Castagnoli. The match would end by Albright catching Castagnoli in a half nelson, suplexing him before pinning him.

AAA had another guest competitor in Alex Koslov against Roderick Strong. The match was characterized by heavy shots and stiff throws delivered by both men, but neither was able to pin his opponent. The match would end by Strong delivering a kick to Koslov's face before hooking his legs, and applying a Boston crab he calls the Strong Hold to get the submission victory.

=== Main Event matches ===
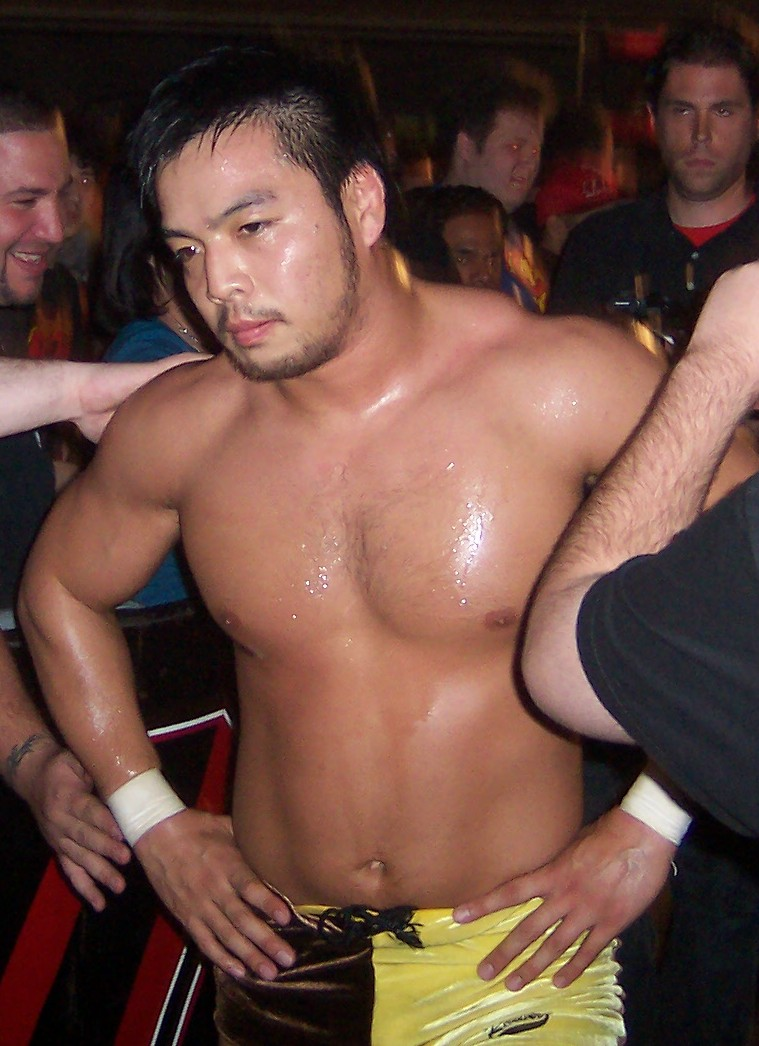
Kenta, one of the participants in the main event.

The first of two main events was the Four-Corner Survival match for the ROH World Championship in Jerry Lynn's first title defense against Bryan Danielson, D'Lo Brown, and Erick Stevens. The match was fast-paced as all four men would exchange duel encounters with each other. The finish of the match came when Danielson hit his signature dive over the top rope onto Brown as Lynn caught Stevens, executing his signature piledriver before pinning him.

The main event match followed with Austin Aries and Katsuhiko Nakajima versus Tyler Black and Kenta. Early on Kenta and Nakajima delivered several aggressive kicks to each other, neither budged. This was followed up by Black getting into the match before being double-teamed by his opponents, only to have his partner aide him. From that point, Kenta and Nakajima would continue to exchange kicks and stomps before Kenta hoisted Nakajima on his shoulders to execute his knee to the face dubbed the Go 2 Sleep, only to be countered by a headscissors from his opponent. Aries would be tagged into the match, connecting with a suplex and a kick of his own before Black would make his way into the ring. The match ended with Black grabbing Aries with a facelock before executing a leg hook brainbuster before getting the pinfall victory.

== Results ==
No.	Results	Stipulations	Times
1^{D}	Ernie Osiris defeated Grizzly Redwood	Singles match	—
2^{D}	Alex Payne, Andy Ridge and Bobby Dempsey defeated Darin Childs, Don Juan and Mike Dell	Six-man tag team match	—
3^{D}	Rhett Titus defeated Luke Williams	Singles match	—
4	Colt Cabana defeated Ace Steel	Singles match	09:20
5	El Generico and Kevin Steen, Jay Briscoe and Magno defeated Sweet n' Sour Inc. (Chris Hero, Davey Richards and Eddie Edwards) and Incognito	Eight-man tag team match	09:27
6	Necro Butcher defeated Jimmy Jacobs	No Disqualification match	14:53
7	Brent Albright defeated Blue Demon Jr. and Claudio Castagnoli	Triple threat match	05:38
8	Roderick Strong defeated Alex Koslov by submission	Singles match	07:40
9	Jerry Lynn (c) defeated Bryan Danielson, D'Lo Brown and Erick Stevens	Four-way match for the ROH World Championship	08:10
10	Kenta and Tyler Black defeated Austin Aries and Katsuhiko Nakajima	Tag team match	22:15
(c) / – the champion(s) heading into the match; D / – this was a dark match

== See also ==
- 2009 in professional wrestling
- List of Ring of Honor pay-per-view events
