= ROH Honor Rumble =

The Honor Rumble is a periodically held battle royal promoted by the U.S.-based professional wrestling promotion Ring of Honor.

This battle royal differs from a standard version of the match in that the contestants do not all begin in the ring at the same time, but instead enter the match at timed intervals in order of their assigned entry numbers (comparable in style to WWE's Royal Rumble match). Numbers are usually drawn through a lottery that is typically staged right before the event begins, although participants can also win desirable spots via a number of other means, the most common being winning a match.

The match begins with the two wrestlers who have drawn entry numbers one and two, with the remaining wrestlers entering the ring at regular timed intervals (usually 90 seconds or two minutes) in the ascending order of their entry numbers. The winner of the Honor Rumble receives a chance to wrestle for the ROH World Championship. The first Honor Rumble took place on July 26, 2008 at ROH New Horizons.

== Dates, venues, events and winners ==
List of Honor Rumble events, dates, locations and venues
	Event	Date	Venue (City)	Winner	Ref.	Main event
1	New Horizons	July 26, 2008	Michigan State Fairgrounds Coliseum (Detroit, Michigan)	Ruckus		Bryan Danielson vs. Tyler Black in a singles match
2	ROH on HDNet	August 15, 2009	The Arena (Philadelphia Pennsylvania)	The Briscoes (Jay Briscoe and Mark Briscoe)		Honor Rumble match
3	Southern Defiance	December 3, 2011	Spartanburg Memorial Auditorium (Spartanburg, South Carolina)	Jay Lethal		Honor Rumble match
4	A New Dawn	September 28, 2013	Hopkins Eisenhower Community Center (Hopkins, Minnesota)	Mark Briscoe		Adam Cole (c) vs. Mark Briscoe (with Jay Briscoe) in a singles match for the ROH World Championship
5	Ring of Honor Wrestling	October 11, 2014	WesBanco Arena (Wheeling, West Virginia)	Michael Bennett		Honor Rumble match
6	Reloaded Tour	September 16, 2016	Kenan Center (Lockport, New York)	Silas Young		Honor Rumble match
7	Ring of Honor Wrestling	August 26, 2017	Center Stage (Atlanta, Georgia)	Frankie Kazarian		Honor Rumble Match
8	G1 Supercard	April 6, 2019	Madison Square Garden (New York City, New York)	Kenny King		Jay White (c) vs Kazuchika Okada in a singles match for the IWGP Heavyweight Championship
8	Death Before Dishonor XVIII	September 12, 2021	2300 Arena (Philadelphia, Pennsylvania)	Alex Zayne		Bandido (c) vs EC3 vs Brody King vs Flamita in a Four-way elimination match for the ROH World Championship

== See also ==
- Casino Battle Royale
- Royal Rumble match
- Gauntlet for the Gold
