= ROH New Horizons =

New Horizons
- Promotional poster featuring Nigel McGuinness and Claudio Castagnoli
- Promotion: Ring of Honor
- Date: July 26, 2008 (aired September 26, 2008)
- City: Detroit, Michigan
- Venue: Michigan State Fairgrounds & Expo Center
- Attendance: 750

Pay-per-view chronology
← Previous; Respect is Earned II	Next → Driven

New Horizons was a professional wrestling pay-per-view (PPV) event produced by Ring of Honor (ROH). It took place on July 26, 2008 from the Michigan State Fairgrounds & Expo Center in Detroit, Michigan, and was first aired on September 26.

== Storylines ==
Other on-screen personnel
Role	Name
Commentators	Dave Prazak
Commentators	Lenny Leonard

New Horizons featured storylines and professional wrestling matches that involved different wrestlers from pre-existing scripted feuds and storylines. Storylines were produced on ROH's weekly television programme Ring of Honor Wrestling.

== Results ==
No.	Results	Stipulations	Times
1^{D}	Ernie Osiris, Kyle Durden, and Alex Payne defeated Rocky Fontaine, Ninja White, and Ninja Yellow	Six-man tag team match	—
2^{D}	D-Ray 3000 defeated Shane Hollister	Singles match	—
3	The Briscoe Brothers (Jay Briscoe and Mark Briscoe) defeated Silas Young and Mitch Franklin	Tag team match	1:44
4	Erick Stevens defeated Ruckus, Delirious and Shane Hagadorn	Four Corner Survival match	4:49
5	Kevin Steen defeated Necro Butcher	No Disqualification match	8:41
6	Nigel McGuinness (c) defeated Claudio Castagnoli	Singles match for the ROH World Championship	19:22
7^{D}	Silas Young defeated Kenny Omega	Singles match	—
8	Roderick Strong and Naomichi Marufuji defeated Chris Hero and Go Shiozaki (with Larry Sweeney)	Tag team match	11:53
9	Bryan Danielson defeated Tyler Black	Singles match	24:30
10^{D}	Ruckus defeated Bobby Dempsey, Kyle Durden, Jay Briscoe, Erick Stevens, Claudio Castagnoli, Ernie Osiris, Necro Butcher, Bushwhacker Luke, Mark Briscoe, Rhett Titus, Sara Del Rey, Alex Payne, Delirious, and Nigel McGuinness	Honor Rumble match	—
(c) / – the champion(s) heading into the match; D / – this was a dark match

== See also ==
- 2008 in professional wrestling
- List of Ring of Honor pay-per-view events
