= McGuckian =

McGuckian is a surname. Notable people with the surname include:

- Alan McGuckian (born 1953), Northern Irish Roman Catholic bishop
- Mary McGuckian (born 1965), Northern Irish filmmaker
- Medbh McGuckian (born 1950), Northern Irish poet

== See also ==
- McGuckin
