= ROH Take No Prisoners =

- Promotions: Ring of Honor
- First event: Take No Prisoners (2008)
- Last event: Take No Prisoners (2009)

ROH Take No Prisoners was a professional wrestling pay-per-view (PPV) event produced by Ring of Honor.

== Events ==
#	Event	Date	Date aired	City	Venue	Main Event
1	Take No Prisoners	March 16, 2008	May 30, 2008	Pennsylvania National Guard Armory	Philadelphia, Pennsylvania	Nigel McGuiness (c) versus Tyler Black for the ROH World Championship
2	Take No Prisoners 2009	April 4, 2009	June 12, 2009	George R. Brown Convention Center	Houston, Texas	Tyler Black and KENTA vs. Austin Aries and Katsuhiko Nakajima
(c) – refers to the champion(s) heading into the match
