= Rupert McGuigan =

British diplomat and secretary (born 1941)

Rupert McGuigan was Private Secretary to The Princess Royal between 1997 and 1999.

He was born in 1941 and educated at Marlborough College, and Magdalene College, Cambridge, where he graduated in law. McGuigan worked for BP Ltd from 1964 until 1972, when he joined the Diplomatic Service.

From 1974 to 1977 he was 1st Secretary in New Delhi, and then 1978–1981 in Kingston. From 1981 to 1985 he was in the Permanent Under Secretary of State's Department of the Foreign and Commonwealth Office. From 1985 to 1988 he was 1st Secretary in Bridgetown. From 1989 to 1993 he was Counsellor in Lagos, and then 1994-196 Kingston.

He retired from the Foreign and Commonwealth Office in 1997 and joined the Office of the Princess Royal.

The Household of The Princess Royal provides the administrative support to Anne, Princess Royal, daughter of Queen Elizabeth II. It is based at Buckingham Palace, and is headed by the Private Secretary.

The Household is separate from the Royal Household and is funded from the Civil List annuity paid to The Princess Royal for her public duties - which is however reimbursed to HM Treasury by Her Majesty The Queen.
