= Frank Joseph McGuigan =

American psychologist

- Born: December 7, 1924; Oklahoma City, Oklahoma, U.S.
- Died: April 8, 1998 (aged 73); San Diego, California, U.S.
- Education: University of California, Los Angeles
- Known for: Cybernetics; Electrophysiology; Psychophysiology
- Scientific career
- Fields: Psychology
- Institutions: Pepperdine University; University of Nevada; George Washington University; Hollins College; University of Hawaii; North Carolina State University; University of Louisville School of Medicine; Hiroshima Shudo University; United States International University
- Thesis: A test of the effect of secondary reinforcement in concept formation (1950)

Frank Joseph McGuigan (December 7, 1924 – April 8, 1998) was an American psychologist. His research spanned multiple areas, including cybernetics, electrophysiology, and psychophysiology.
