= Jigsaw (wrestler) =

American professional wrestler

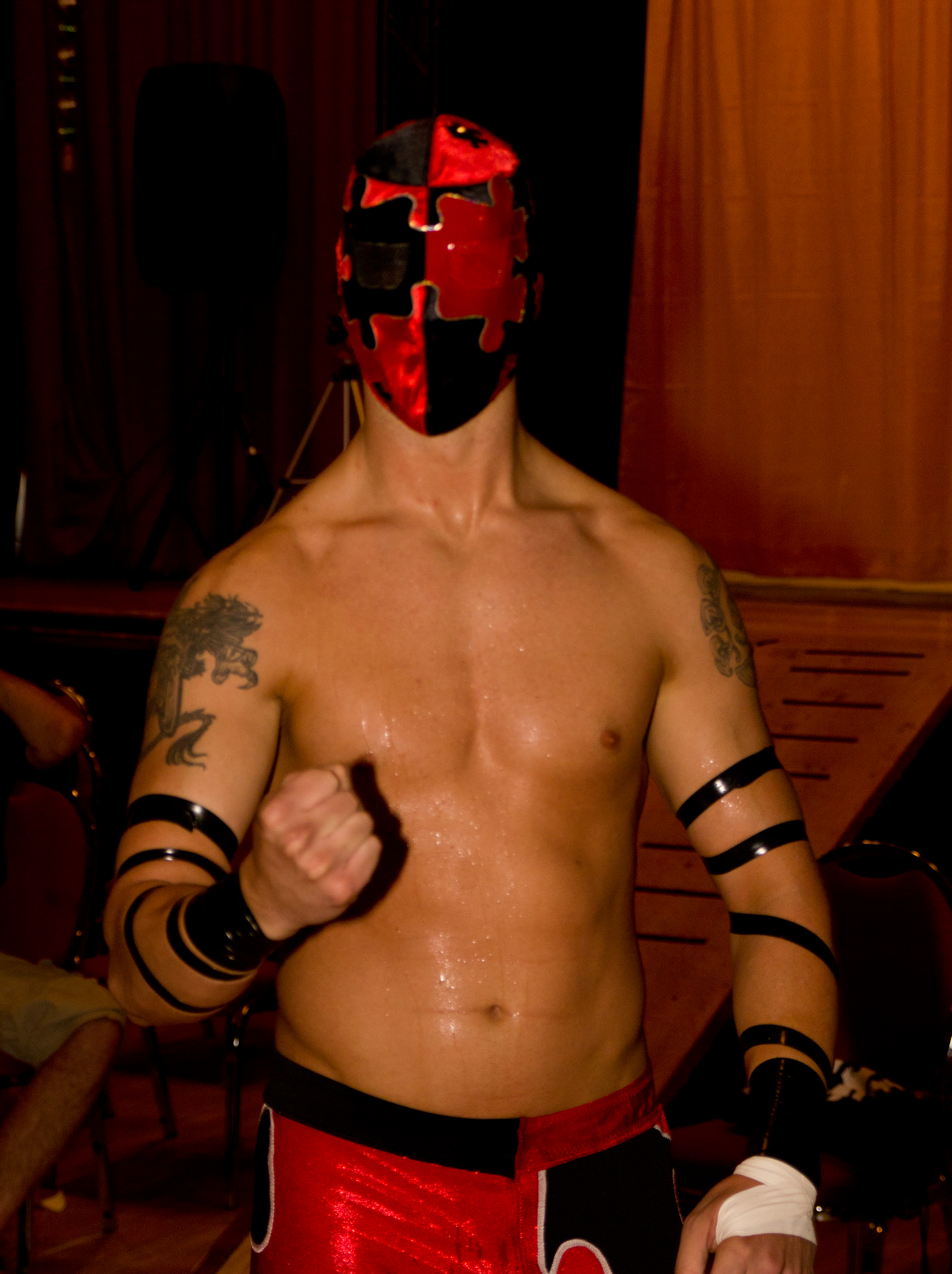
- Jigsaw at an independent wrestling show in July 2012

Personal information
- Born: Edward McGuckin; December 16, 1983 (age 42)

Professional wrestling career
- Ring name(s): Jigsaw; Rubix
- Billed height: 6 ft 2 in (1.88 m)
- Billed weight: 189 lb (86 kg)
- Billed from: The Bermuda Triangle; The Bronx, New York
- Trained by: Chikara Wrestle Factory; Mike Quackenbush; Reckless Youth; Jorge Rivera; Chris Hero; Marty Jannetty; Ted DiBiase
- Debut: November 16, 2002

Edward McGuckin (born December 16, 1983) is an American former professional wrestler, better known by the ring name Jigsaw. He is best known for his work on the independent circuit for promotions such as Chikara, Combat Zone Wrestling (CZW), Dragon Gate USA, Full Impact Pro (FIP), and Ring of Honor (ROH) and has also made appearances for Total Nonstop Action Wrestling (TNA), where he worked under the ring name Rubix. He is also known for his work on the most notably in the United Kingdom for promotions such as HOPE Wrestling and Fight Club Pro (FCP).

== Professional wrestling career ==
Jigsaw was originally trained as a professional wrestler at the Chikara Wrestle Factory by Mike Quackenbush.

=== Chikara (2002–2007) ===
Jigsaw made his Chikara debut in late 2002, forming a rudo tag team named The Conundrum with Rorschach, while also occasionally teaming with Eddie Kingston and BlackJack Marciano as a member of The Toxic Trio. On May 22, 2004, at Aniversario 3: Dodging the Sophomore Jinx The Toxic Trio faced Mike Quackenbush, Gran Akuma and Icarus in an Ultimate Jeopardy match. During the match, which The Toxic Trio lost, Kingston and Marciano turned on Jigsaw, effectively turning him into a tecnico. In July 2004, Jigsaw reached the finals of Chikara's Young Lions Cup tournament, but was defeated by Larry Sweeney after outside interference from Rorschach, who then joined Sweeney's Sweet 'n' Sour International stable. On October 30 Jigsaw led an eight man team to face Sweet 'n' Sour International in the annual torneo cibernetico match. Jigsaw won the match by pinning Sweeney, after one of Sweeney's stable mates, named Spyrazul, turned on him and then unmasked himself to reveal Mike Quackenbush. At the following show Fear of Music on November 19, 2004, Jigsaw defeated Sweeney to win the Young Lions Cup.

Jigsaw successfully defended his title for a year and was forced to vacate it for the 2005 edition of the Young Lions Cup tournament. Jigsaw feuded the rest of the year with fellow Chikara veteran Hallowicked and defeated him in a two out of three falls match on November 13, 2005. In early 2006 Jigsaw entered the Tag World Grand Prix teaming with Arik Cannon, but the team were eliminated in the second round of the tournament by Osamu Nishimura and Katsushi Takemura. Jigsaw would then enter a feud with Icarus, whom he would defeat on July 22, 2006, in a mask vs. hair match. The remainder of the year Jigsaw spent teaming with Mike Quackenbush and Shane Storm. 2007 started off with Jigsaw, Quackenbush and Storm winning the inaugural King of Trios tournament. Afterwards the trio went on a losing streak and on October 27, 2007, Jigsaw turned on Storm and pinned him in a tag team match to end the union for good. After competing in a trios match on November 16, 2007, Jigsaw left Chikara, in order to concentrate on his work with Ring of Honor.

=== Combat Zone Wrestling (2006) ===
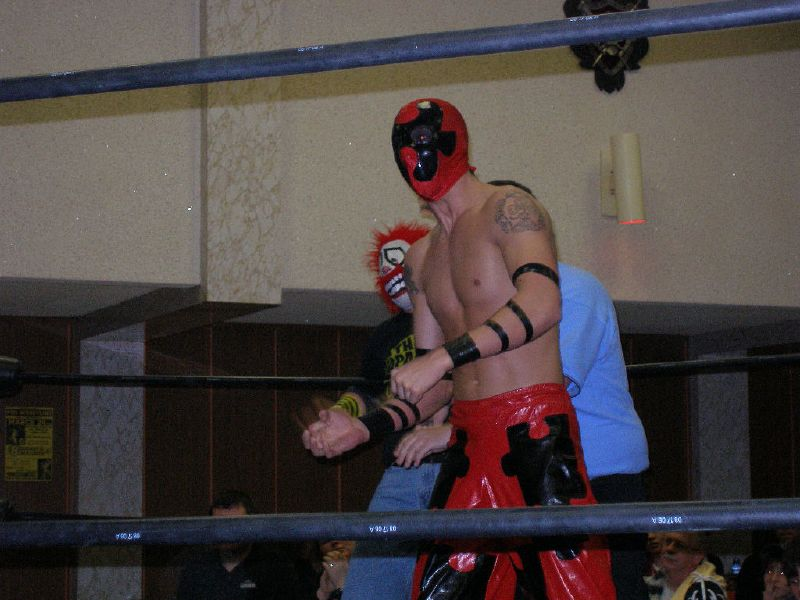
Jigsaw at a Chikara show in 2007

In 2006, he competed in Combat Zone Wrestling's annual Best of the Best tournament, losing to Austin Aries and B-Boy in the opening round. He, however, defeated Sonjay Dutt on September 9, 2006 at Expect the Unexpected for the World Junior Heavyweight Championship. He held the championship until Out with the Old, In with the New in April 2007, when he lost it to Scotty Vortekz.

=== Ring of Honor (2007–2008, 2012) ===
Jigsaw joined Ring of Honor in 2007, forming The Vulture Squad alliance with Jack Evans, Ruckus, Julius Smokes to combat The Age of the Fall alliance. The Vulture Squad teamed together in a six-man tag team match against The Age of the Fall at Glory by Honor VI on November 1, 2007. The following month, female wrestler Mercedes Martinez also joined The Vulture Squad on December 20 at Final Battle 2007.

At Breakout in January 2008, Jigsaw teamed with Matt Cross to take on The Briscoe Brothers. After Jigsaw and Ruckus failed to win the World Tag Team Championship from the No Remorse Corps (Davey Richards and Rocky Romero), Jigsaw removed his mask as he had promised to do before the match. At a Dragon Gate/ROH supercard in March, Jigsaw and Ruckus defeated the team of Kenny King and Sal Rinauro by pinfall. On April 11, 2008 at Bedlam In Beantown, Jigsaw was defeated by Eddie Edwards. In May at the pay-per-view event Take No Prisoners, Ruckus and Jigsaw defeated Adam Pearce and B. J. Whitmer in a dark match. Later in the pay-per-view, however, they competed in a World Tag Team Championship match against the champions No Remorse Corps, but were defeated. In September at Driven, The Briscoe Brothers defeated Ruckus and Jigsaw, The YRR (Jason Blade and Kenny King), and Necro Butcher in a Tag Team Scramble match.

On January 20, 2012, Jigsaw returned to ROH at an event in Philadelphia, where he and Hallowicked, supported by several Chikara wrestlers including Mike Quackenbush and UltraMantis Black, defeated the Briscoe Brothers to earn a shot at the ROH World Tag Team Championship. Jigsaw and Hallowicked received their title opportunity on April 28, but were unable to dethrone the Briscoe Brothers in a rematch.

=== Return to Chikara (2008–2014, 2016) ===
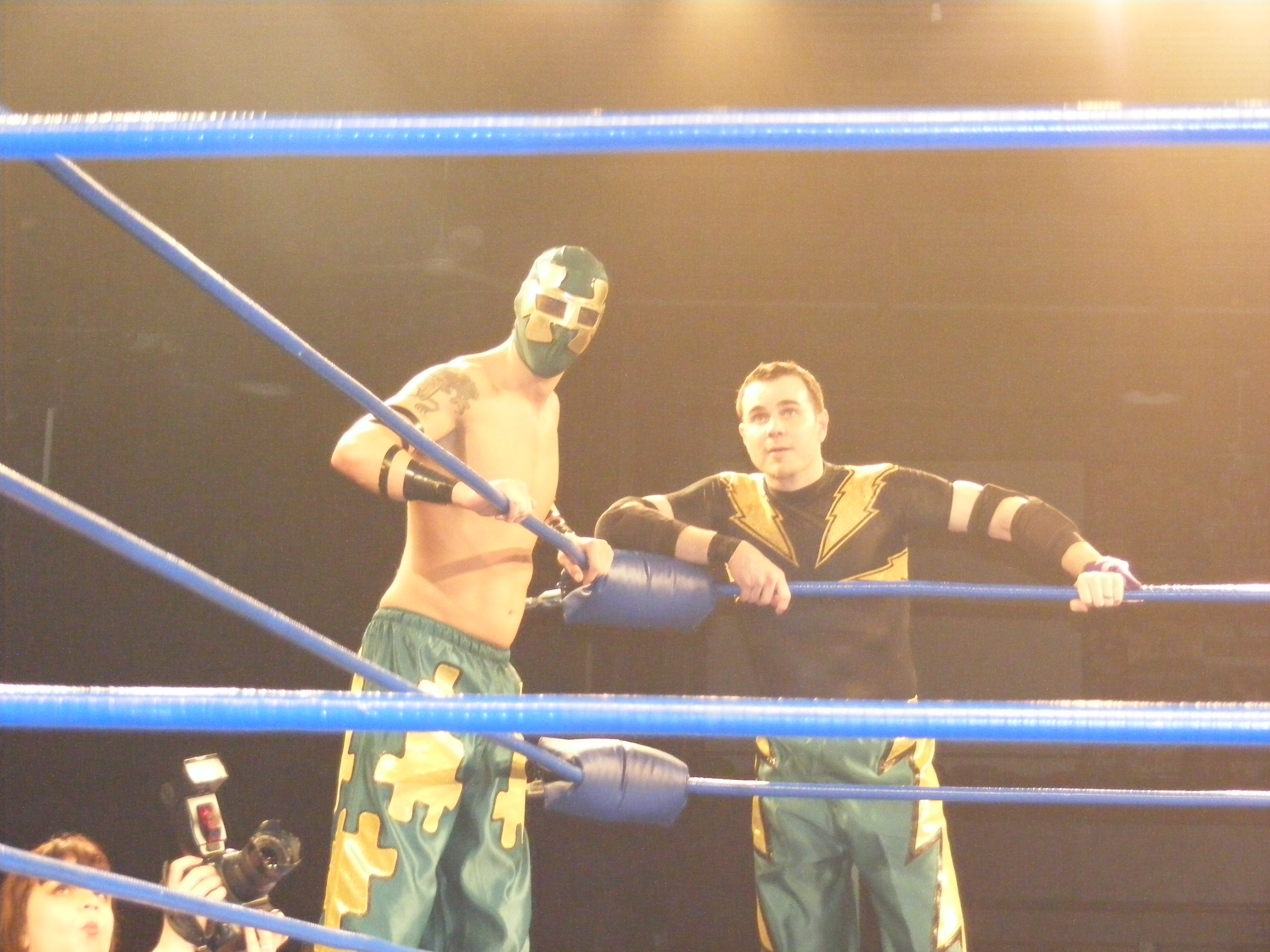
Jigsaw and Mike Quackenbush in April 2011

Jigsaw made a return to Chikara, sans mask, in September 2008, saving his trainer Mike Quackenbush from a violent assault at the hands of the UnStable (Vin Gerard, STIGMA (the former Shane Storm), and Colin Delaney). Despite his help, Quackenbush refused to accept him back into the promotion. The following month, Gerard attempted to recruit Jigsaw to the UnStable, noting that the two had a lot in common regarding their former identities under masks and their rejections from the Chikara locker room. Jigsaw refused to accept the spot and superkicked STIGMA, with Quackenbush aiding him in chasing the rudos away. On December 14, 2008, Quackenbush and Tim Donst were slated to face Delaney and STIGMA in a tag team match. However, during the match Donst suffered an injury, which led to Jigsaw entering the match with his mask back on. The match ended with Jigsaw pinning STIGMA with the Jig 'n' Tonic.

In early 2009, Jigsaw and Quackenbush scored their third win in a row, which meant that they could now challenge for the Campeonatos de Parejas. The championship match took place on April 25, but Jigsaw and Quackenbush were unable to defeat the reigning champions The Osirian Portal (Amasis and Ophidian). With Quackenbush out with a knee injury, he positioned Jigsaw as the mentor for the stable of younger wrestlers, called The Future Is Now, which consisted of Equinox, Helios and Lince Dorado. During the rest of the year, he also feuded with Gran Akuma, whom he would defeat in the main event on November 21. On October 23, 2010, Jigsaw represented Chikara in the torneo cibernetico match, where the company's originals faced Bruderschaft des Kreuzes (BDK). He was eliminated from the match by BDK's Tim Donst. After several attempts and failures at getting their third point, Jigsaw and Quackenbush finally earned their title match by winning a four–way elimination match on November 22, during which they made all three eliminations. On December 12, 2010, at the season nine finale Reality is Relative Jigsaw and Quackenbush cashed in their points and defeated Ares and Castagnoli two falls to one to win the Campeonatos de Parejas for the first time. For the 2011 King of Trios, Jigsaw and Quackenbush formed a trio with Japanese joshi legend Manami Toyota and on April 15 defeated Amazing Red, Joel Maximo and Wil Maximo in their first round match. The following day, the trio was eliminated from the tournament in the quarterfinal stage by Team Michinoku Pro (Dick Togo, Great Sasuke and Jinsei Shinzaki). On September 18, Jigsaw and Quackenbush lost the Campeonatos de Parejas to F.I.S.T. (Chuck Taylor and Johnny Gargano) in their third defense. In November and December 2011, Jigsaw represented Chikara in Osaka Pro Wrestling, making his first tour of Japan in the process. The tour, which lasted from November 27 to December 18, saw Jigsaw take part in the annual Tenno-zan tournament, where he made it all the way to the semifinals, before losing to Kuuga. On May 20, 2012, during Chikara's tenth anniversary weekend, Jigsaw received his first shot at the Chikara Grand Championship, but was unable to dethrone Eddie Kingston. On September 14, Jigsaw and Mike Quackenbush reunited with Manami Toyota for the 2012 King of Trios, defeating combatAnt, deviAnt and Soldier Ant in their first round match. The following day, the team was eliminated from the tournament, after losing to Team Sendai Girls (Dash Chisako, Meiko Satomura and Sendai Sachiko).

During the second half of 2012, Jigsaw began having problems with Mike Quackenbush, who had started to eliminate members of the rudo stable Gekido from Chikara, showing a new mean streak. On November 18, as Quackenbush was set to attack Gekido member The Shard, Jigsaw turned on him by superkicking him and then left the arena with The Shard. On December 2 at Chikara's third iPPV, Under the Hood, Jigsaw led Gekido to a win over Chikara in an eight man tag team match. Afterwards, Jigsaw and The Shard broke away from the rest of Gekido, forming a tag team named "Pieces of Hate". Jigsaw's rivalry with Mike Quackenbush built to a special tag team match on April 6, where he and The Shard were defeated by Quackenbush and his surprise tag team partner, Jushin Thunder Liger. On May 18, Jigsaw and The Shard took part in the 2013 Tag World Grand Prix. After wins over Da Soul Touchaz (Acid Jaz and Marshe Rockett) and AC/DC (Arik Cannon and Darin Corbin), the two defeated The Young Bucks (Matt Jackson and Nick Jackson) to win the tournament, earn three points and a shot at the Campeonatos de Parejas. On June 2 at Aniversario: Never Compromise, Pieces of Hate defeated 3.0 (Scott Parker and Shane Matthews) to become the new Campeones de Parejas. Following the event, Chikara went on a break, which lasted until May 2014. On July 20, Pieces of Hate lost the Campeonatos de Parejas to the Throwbacks (Dasher Hatfield and Mark Angelosetti) in their first defense. In September, Jigsaw represented Gekido in the 2014 King of Trios, alongside The Shard and 17. The team made it to the second round before losing to Archibald Peck, Shane Matthews and Scott Parker. Following the loss, Jigsaw turned on Gekido by superkicking The Shard, but also turned down an offer by Mike Quackenbush to re-join Chikara.

On September 2, 2016, Jigsaw returned to Chikara as part of Hallowicked's team in the 2016 King of Trios tournament. The rudo team, which also included Icarus, defeated Bullet Ant, Missile Assault Man and Worker Ant in their first round match. The following day, Jigsaw, Hallowicked and Icarus defeated Major League Moustache (Dasher Hatfield, Trent Seven and Tyler Bate) to advance to the semifinals of the tournament. On the third and final day of the tournament, Jigsaw, Hallowicked and Icarus were eliminated after being disqualified in their semifinal match against Team JWP (Command Bolshoi, Hanako Nakamori and Manami Katsu).

=== Dragon Gate USA (2009–2013) ===
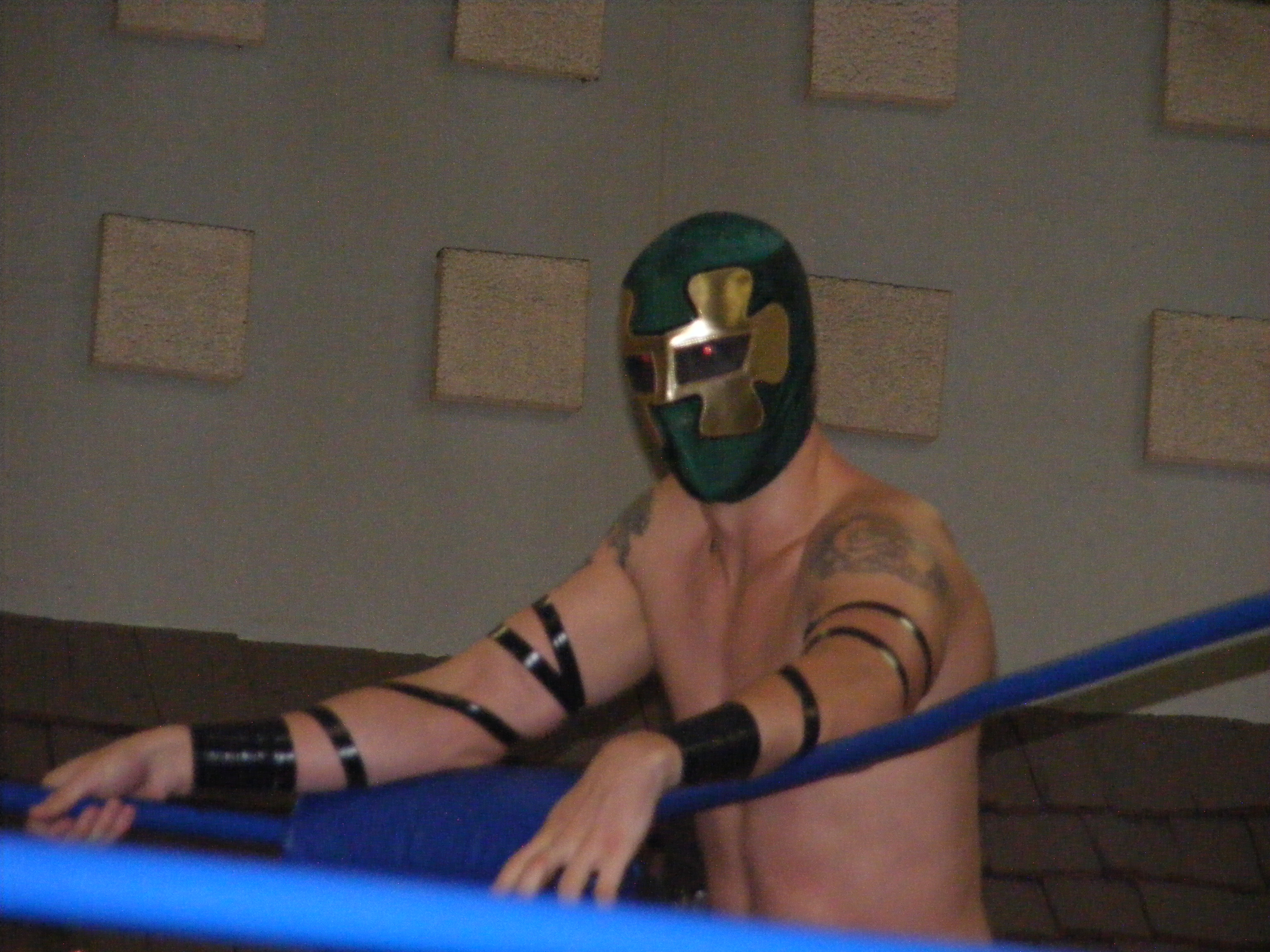
Jigsaw in August 2010

In 2009, Jigsaw began making appearances for Dragon Gate USA, the American counterpart of the Japanese professional wrestling promotion Dragon Gate. At their first pay-per-view event Enter the Dragon on September 4, Jigsaw teamed with The Colony (Fire Ant and Soldier Ant) and Mike Quackenbush to defeat F.I.S.T. (Icarus and Gran Akuma), Amasis and Hallowicked in an eight-man tag team match. At the following pay-per-view, Untouchable on November 6, 2009, Jigsaw and Quackenbush once again teamed together to defeat YAMATO and Gran Akuma. On November 28 at Freedom Fight, he defeated Eddie Kingston in a singles match. On January 23, 2010, at Fearless, Jigsaw and Quackenbush defeated the team of CIMA and Super Crazy in a tag team match. At the two following shows, Open the Ultimate Gate and Mercury Rising, on March 26 and 27, Jigsaw and Quackenbush lost to Genki Horiguchi and Susumu Yokosuka and defeated The Young Bucks in tag team matches. On May 7 at Open the Northern Gate Jigsaw and Quackenbush defeated Kamikaze USA representatives Gran Akuma and Akira Tozawa in a tag team match and were then assaulted by their teammates YAMATO and Shingo. At the following day's tapings of the Uprising pay-per-view, Jigsaw and Quackenbush were defeated by the team of Naruki Doi and PAC. After the match Quackenbush challenged YAMATO to a tag team match, before he and Jigsaw were once again jumped by the members of Kamikaze USA. On July 24 at the tapings of the Enter the Dragon 2010 pay–per–view, Jigsaw, Quackenbush and Hallowicked teamed up with the Open the Dream Gate Champion Masato Yoshino to defeat Kamikaze USA's YAMATO, Gran Akuma, Akira Tozawa and Jon Moxley in an eight man elimination tag team match. On the January 28, 2011, United: NYC, live pay-per-view, Jigsaw was defeated by Moxley in a grudge match.

=== Total Nonstop Action Wrestling (2012–2014) ===
On June 28, 2012, McGuckin, working under the ring name Rubix, made his debut for Total Nonstop Action Wrestling (TNA), losing to Sonjay Dutt in a TNA X Division Championship tournament qualifying match on Impact Wrestling. On July 8 at Destination X, Rubix got another opportunity to earn his way back into the tournament, but was defeated by Mason Andrews in a four-way Last Chance match, which also included Dakota Darsow and Lars Only. McGuckin, once again working as Rubix, returned to TNA on January 12, 2013, to take part in the tapings of the One Night Only: X-Travaganza special, wrestling in an Ultimate X match, which was won by Kenny King and also included Mason Andrews and Zema Ion. Rubix returned to TNA on July 18 to take part in the Destination X episode of Impact Wrestling. Entering a tournament to determine the new X Division Champion, he was defeated by Greg Marasciulo in a first round three-way match, which also included Rockstar Spud. Rubix returned to TNA on April 12, 2014, for another One Night Only taping, losing to Kenny King.

== Personal life ==
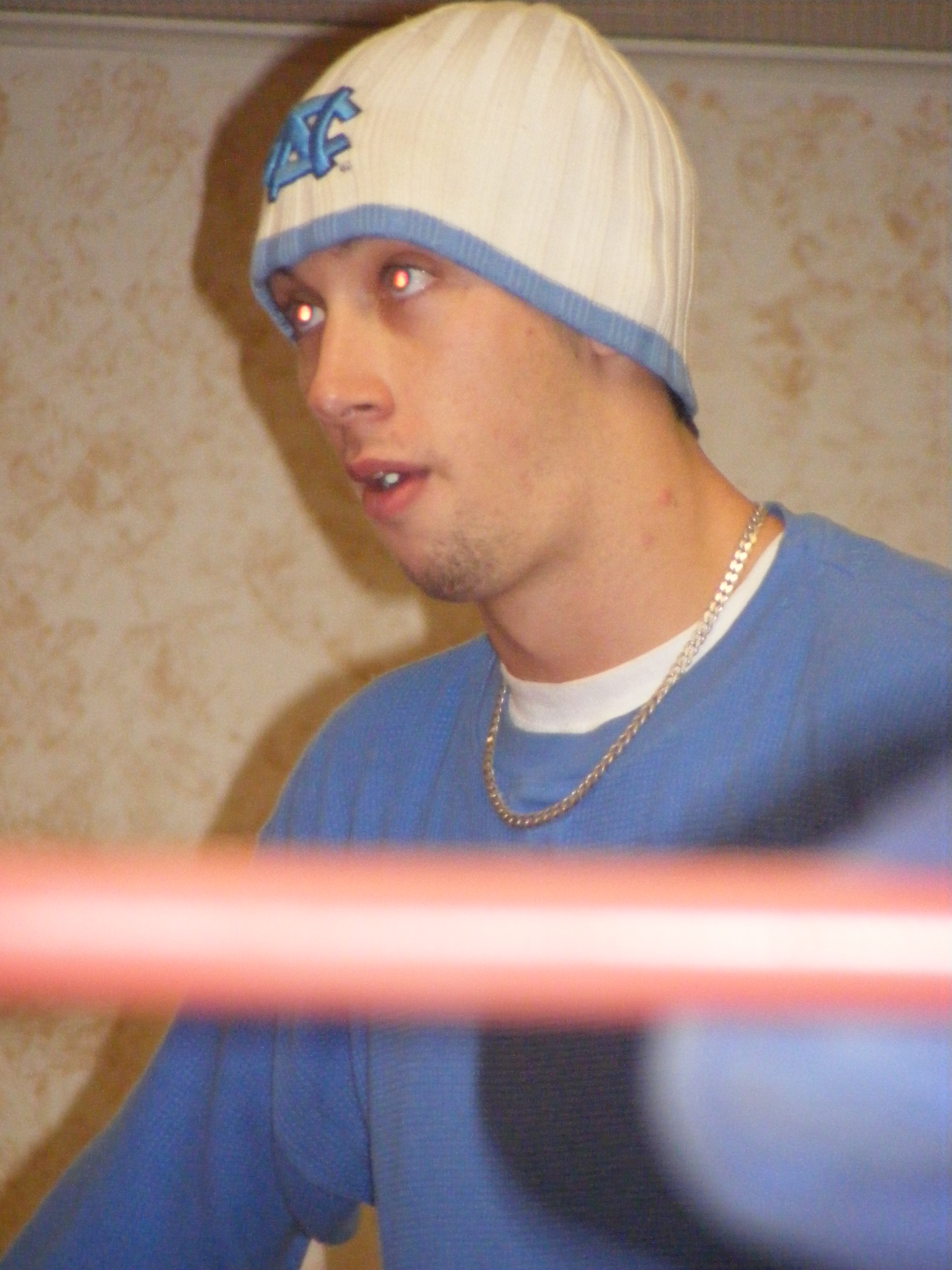
An unmasked Jigsaw in 2008

McGuckin's brother is also a wrestler and Chikara alumni, using the ring names Tyler Murphy and Jolly Roger.

== Championships and accomplishments ==
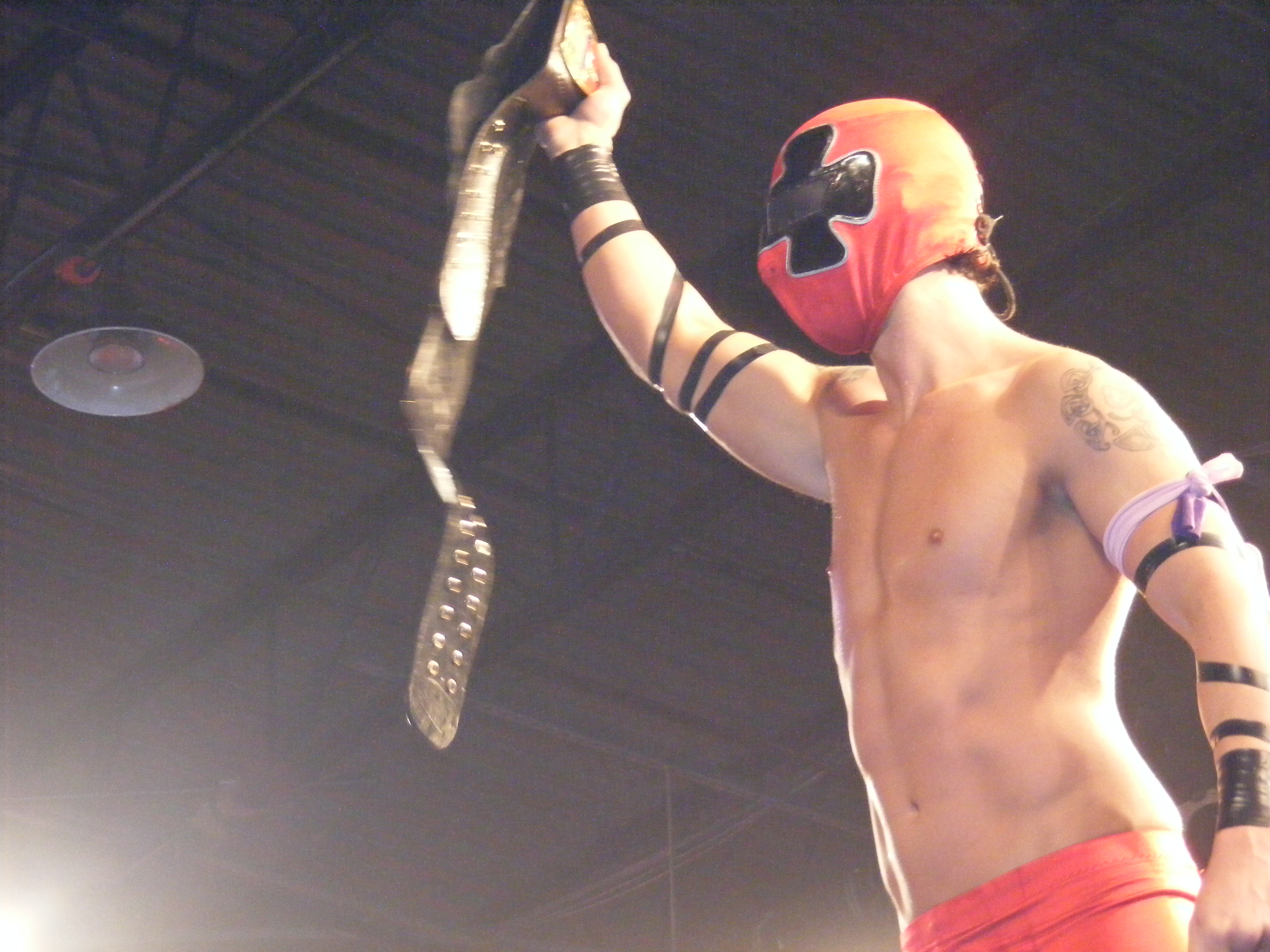
Jigsaw holding a Chikara Campeonatos de Parejas belt in April 2011

- Chikara
  - Campeonatos de Parejas (2 times) – with Mike Quackenbush (1) and The Shard (1)
  - Young Lions Cup (1 time)
  - King of Trios (2007) – with Mike Quackenbush and Shane Storm
  - Tag World Grand Prix (2013) – with The Shard
  - Torneo Cibernetico (2004)
- Combat Zone Wrestling
  - CZW World Junior Heavyweight Championship (1 time)
- Family Wrestling Entertainment
  - FWE Tag Team Championship (1 time) – with Tony Nese
- House of Pain: Evolution
  - HOPE Kings Of Flight Championship (2 times)
- LDN Wrestling
  - LDN British Heavyweight Championship (1 time)
- Pro Wrestling Illustrated
  - Ranked No. 259 of the top 500 singles wrestlers in the PWI 500 in 2010

== Luchas de Apuestas record ==
Winner (wager)	Loser (wager)	Location	Event	Date	Notes
Jigsaw (mask)	Icarus (hair)	Hellertown, Pennsylvania	The Crushing Weight of Mainstream Ignorance	July 22, 2006	
