= Age of the Fall =

Professional wrestling stable

- The Age of the Fall logo

Stable
- Leader: Jimmy Jacobs
- Members: See below
- Name(s): Age of the Fall; Project 161
- Debut: September 15, 2007
- Disbanded: June 27, 2009
- Years active: 2007–2009

The Age of the Fall, previously known as Project 161 before its debut, was a villainous American professional wrestling stable, primarily in Ring of Honor and its sister promotion Full Impact Pro, but also in other independent promotions such as Pro Wrestling Guerrilla.

== History ==
=== Ring of Honor ===
==== 2007 ====
For months leading into the ROH return to Chicago there were cryptic messages on a blog and website of a stable entering ROH that was code named "Project 161". Jimmy Jacobs was one of the names mentioned who could be behind this along with Adam Pearce and a few other Chicago-based ROH wrestlers. At one point, posts related to Project 161 flooded the ROH message board, but ROH booker Gabe Sapolsky claimed these were actually fans' doing. Many fans noted that an upcoming pay-per-view taping (Man Up) would be the 161st ROH show, and it was no coincidence that the stable stated they would appear at the show.

After making a successful return to ROH, Jimmy Jacobs, the returning Necro Butcher and the debuting Tyler Black violently attacked The Briscoe Brothers right after a brutal ladder match with Kevin Steen and El Generico. This meant Jimmy Jacobs was indeed behind Project 161. Jay Briscoe was hung upside from the rigging that was used to hoist the titles from the ladder match. This was a disgusting scene as the blood of Jay Briscoe dripped onto Jimmy Jacobs' solid white clothes, and at one point into his mouth, as he announced "The Age of the Fall has begun". The angle was so controversial that ROH decided to remove the footage from the pay-per view that was being taped at the event. However, the footage was also heavily requested by ROH fans, so it was shown on the ROH Videowire for the week of September 15. Also, a "blood edit" of their debut is featured on the DVD of the event, Man Up. Later on in the event, Tyler Black and Jack Evans faced off in a non-PPV match until both Jimmy Jacobs and Necro Butcher got involved. The Irish Airborne entered the ring to save Jack Evans, which led to a six-man tag between The Age of the Fall and the makeshift three-man team of Jack Evans and the Irish Airborne. The match battled to a no-contest as Necro Butcher punched out the referee during the middle of the match.

The day after their debut, their website, which now redirected to Ageofthefall.com revealed that all the blog entries had been written by Black. In an interview with the German website www.genickbruch.com, Jacobs revealed there would be more people involved. A woman named Allison Wonderland would also become a follower of Jacobs on November 30, debuting in Dayton, Ohio at the Reckless Abandon event, during a 4-Way Tag Team Scramble. At Unscripted III on December 1, Jimmy Jacobs gained arguably the greatest victory of his career, defeating former ROH World Champion Bryan Danielson with his new finisher, the End Time.

At Final Battle 2007 on December 30, 2007, Jacobs and Tyler Black defeated the Briscoe Brothers to win the ROH World Tag Team Championship.

==== 2008 ====
At January 25ths Breakout, Jacobs teamed with the returning Joey Matthews, the newest member of The Age of the Fall, in a losing effort against Roderick Strong and Rocky Romero of the No Remorse Corps. The following night at Without Remorse, Jacobs and Black lost the ROH World Tag Team Championship to the No Remorse Corps' Davey Richards and Rocky Romero in an Ultimate Endurance match involving Brent Albright and B. J. Whitmer of The Hangmen 3, and Austin Aries and Bryan Danielson.

On February 22 at Eye of the Storm, Jacobs introduced Zach Gowen as the newest member of the group. Following the announcement the two of them were defeated by the Vulture Squad of Jigsaw and Ruckus. The group at this time had an open invitation for Austin Aries to join them, writing blogs and posting YouTube videos about and directed at him. Tammy Sytch had made a counter offer to Aries of her services (including offering money and sex) against him joining the group.

On March 29, 2008, at Supercard Of Honor III, Jacobs and Black defeated The Briscoes in a Relaxed Rules Match when Jacobs countered the springboard Doomsday Device into The End Time. Rain accompanied the group to the ring along with Lacey, showing the first (and to date only) time an AOTF member in Full Impact Pro was recognized in ROH. A contributing factor to this appearance was that the show was in Florida where Rain lives. Prior to the match, Jacobs referenced to a 'homeless man' who was shown on camera, saying he had bought him a ticket so he could enjoy the show. The man in question was Mr. Milo Beasley, also a member of AOTF in FIP, but he was neither named or acknowledged as being part of the group. During the match he was driven through a table by a legdrop off a balcony after saving AOTF from suffering the move. Later in the show, AOTF approached Aries after his match, again making the offer for him to join them. Aries left the ring with Lacey, who was going to 'convince' him, rejecting Tammy Sytch's offer (who came out to try to stop Aries leaving with Lacey). Black and Jacobs then held Sytch to allow Rain to slap her, before The Briscoes ran in to make the save.

At ROH's Take No Prisoners pay-per-view on March 16, Black pinned Delirious to win a Four Corner Survival match which also involved Go Shiozaki and Claudio Castagnoli. This earned Black a ROH World Championship match in the show's main event. During the broadcast Jacobs 'interrupted' the broadcast, repeatedly seen speaking alongside Gowen and Wonderland to 'followers' of AOTF. In a Philadelphia Street Fight The Briscoe Brothers (with Daizee Haze) were victorious over Butcher and Matthews (with Lacey). Black was defeated by champion Nigel McGuinness in the championship match. Many called Black's effort a breakout star performance, which had the crowd fully supporting the usually hated AOTF member.

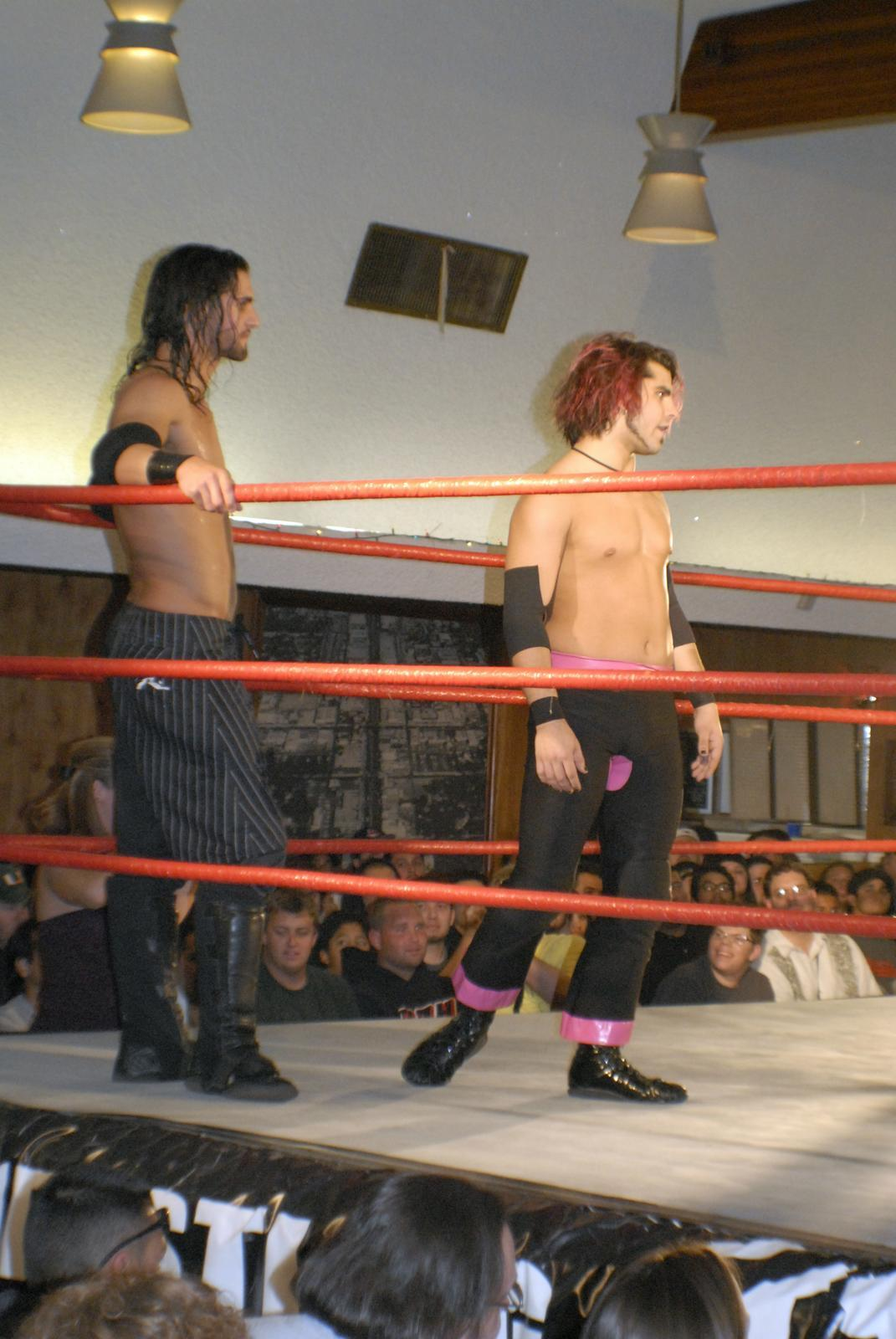
Tyler Black (left) and Jimmy Jacobs in the ring together prior to a tag team match

At Return Engagement on April 19, Lacey left the group, siding with Austin Aries romantically. Aries also turned down the invitation into the group. Jacobs, heartbroken by Lacey leaving him, broke down in the ring to the chants of "Cry, Jimmy, Cry!" from fans and being covered with streamers. Later in the show Jacobs showed signs of a mental breakdown as he hit himself in the head with his trademark spike, to the concern of his fellow group members. The main event was changed as Jacobs pulled out. The Vulture Squad (Ruckus, Jigsaw and Jack Evans) were then beaten by the combination of Matthews, Black and Gowen (who replaced Jacobs). Post match Jacobs called out Aries and the two brawled, before Aries was jumped by Black, Matthews and Gowen. Jacobs went to attack Aries with his spike, but he stopped when Lacey begged him not to.

The AOTF would later ambush Lacey outside of an exercise business in a video posted on their website, where Jacobs produced his spike from his cane before the video cut off. After the video was posted, Lacey was not seen in ROH, SHIMMER or anywhere in wrestling. On the June 5, 2008 edition of the ROH Video Wire, Austin Aries stated in a sit down interview with Dave Prazak that Lacey would not be returning to Ring of Honor as a result of the Age Of The Fall's ambush. In August 2008 the Wrestling Observer confirmed Lacey had quit wrestling to return to school, so the "ambush" served both to further the feud between Jacobs and Aries, and to write Lacey out of the storyline completely.

On June 6, Black and Jacobs recaptured the ROH World Tag Team Championship in a one-night tournament in Hartford, Connecticut at Up for Grabs. They defeated Delirious and Pelle Primeau, Austin Aries and Bryan Danielson via DQ, and Kevin Steen and El Generico en route to beginning their second reign. The following night in Philadelphia at Respect Is Earned II, they defeated Aries and Danielson to retain the titles when Black pinned Danielson with the phoenix splash.

On June 27 in Dayton, Ohio at Battle For Supremacy, Black and Matthews were defeated by Kevin Steen and El Generico when Steen pinned Matthews following the Package Piledriver. Necro Butcher defeated Austin Aries in a "Relaxed Rules" match. After sending Butcher through a table Aries told him to stop doing Jacobs's dirty work for him. Aries then refused to fight back, and after taking a beating was put away with a chair shot to the head.

The next night, June 28, at Vendetta II in Chicago Ridge, Illinois, Aries pinned Jacobs in a "Relaxed Rules" match. During this match, MsChif interfered by blinding Aries with her green mist and was officially made a member of the stable in the group's next blog entry. Stipulations for this match said the winner would pick the loser's match for the next Chicago Ridge event, and Aries picked a No Disqualification match between Jacobs and Necro Butcher. Also during this event Butcher and Black defeated Steen and Generico when Butcher pinned Steen with a roll up after a chair shot to the face from Black.

At this time, AOTF members Matthews and Gowen were not booked for further ROH events. Although neither has been officially written out or removed from the stable, it is considered they are former members due to no longer being on the ROH roster or on shows.

On July 25 at "Northern Navigation" in Toronto, Black and Jacobs were defeated by Austin Aries and Jay Briscoe in a Non-Title NO DQ Match. The bout featured involvement from Mark Briscoe and Necro Butcher; Jacobs ordered Butcher to stab Aries in the eye with a spike but Necro threw it down instead and walked off. Briscoe eventually pinned Black following a springboard Doomsday Device. The next night at "New Horizons" in Detroit, Bryan Danielson defeated Black via referee stoppage after repeated elbow strikes to the head. During this match Black used a turnbuckle powerbomb that actually broke the top turnbuckle off the corner, breaking the top rope. This forced staff to switch the bottom rope for the top, meaning the rest of the show was worked with no bottom rope. Jacobs would brawl with Aries at various moments during the entire show which culminated in a fist fight on top of a 20-foot ladder. Necro Butcher walked out and tipped it over sending them both crashing through a table below.

On August 1, 2008, in Manassas, Virginia st "Fueling The Fire", Black and Jacobs retained the ROH World Tag Team Championships defeating Go Shiozaki and Naomichi Marufuji while Roderick Strong pinned Necro Butcher in a Relaxed Rules Match. The next night at "Death Before Dishonor VI" in New York City, Austin Aries defeated Jacobs and Butcher in a Three Way Dance when he pinned Jacobs with a brainbuster / 450° splash combination. Despite entering together, Jacobs and Butcher would argue during the match; Aries hit Butcher in the back with a chair and threw it to Jacobs. Butcher turned around and assumed it had been Jacobs who had struck him and delivered a punch to the face and a chair shot of his own before leaving the ring and heading to the back. In the show's main event, Black would be pinned by ROH World Champion Nigel McGuiness following two straight lariats in a Four Man Elimination Match that also included Bryan Danielson and Claudio Castagnoli.

On August 15 at "Age Of Insanity" in Cleveland, Ohio, Delirious joined the stable, having changed from his usual 'crazy' antics since being turned down by Daizee Haze (and thus heart broken). Jacobs and Wonderland came out during his match with Rhett Titus, encouraging him to beat down Titus even more. After the match Daizee Haze came out tried to convince Delirious not to join, but failed as he left with his new stablemates. Later in the night Delirious and Jacobs were defeated by the Briscoes in a tag team match, while Aries defeated Black in a 1-on-1 match.

The next night, August 16 in Chicago Ridge at "Night Of The Butcher II", Delirious attacked his scheduled partner Pelle Primeau, an attack which ROH's website described as 'career ending'. Daizee Haze attempted again to convince Delirious to stop, but was attacked by MsChif who used the Desecrater to lay her out. In the main event, Jacobs defeated Necro Butcher in a no disqualification match after Aries ran in to help Butcher, who was being double teamed by Black and Jacobs. Jacobs was preparing to do a move off of the top rope to Necro Butcher, who was being held down on a table by Black, when Aries ran in and tried to stop Jacobs but got powerbombed off the top rope through the table with Butcher lying on it for the 3 count.

On September 13 in Tokyo, Japan at "Battle Of The Best", Black and Jacobs successfully defended the ROH World Tag Team Championships, defeating Jay and Mark Briscoe when Jacobs forced Mark Briscoe to submit to the End Time.

The next night, also in Tokyo at "The Tokyo Summit", the two would lose their respective singles matches. Austin Aries defeated Black via submission with the Last Chancery, post match Jacobs joined Black in attacking Aries before promising to cause chaos in Japan and to win the ROH World title. Black and Jacobs would also attack the Briscoe Brothers after their match, Jacobs again cutting a promo making promises. Jacobs however would lose to Nigel McGuinness in the main event where McGuinness' ROH World Championship was on the line.

On September 19, 2008, in Boston as part of an ROH Pay Per View taping ("Driven 2008"), Austin Aries defeated Delirious via Submission with the Last Chancery after Delirious was distracted by Jacobs demanding Delirious continue to assault Aries. Post match Jacobs put Aries through a table with a back Senton splash off the top rope. In the main event, Kevin Steen and El Generico defeated Jacobs and Black to capture the ROH World Tag Team Championships.

The next night, September 20 at "Glory by Honor VII" in Philadelphia, Austin Aries and The Briscoes defeated Necro Butcher (who was fighting alone with no partners), and the team of Black, Jacobs and Delirious, in a Steel Cage Warfare match. The Briscoes were the last team remaining after the match was left down to them against Black and Jacobs. During the contest, Delirious attacked Daizee Haze (who on ROH Video Wire had stated she wanted to get her friend Delirious back) with a spike when she tried to convince him to stop and leave the group.

On October 24, in Danbury, Connecticut at "Return Of The 187", Necro Butcher defeated Delirious and Mark Briscoe in a No DQ Three Way Dance when he pinned Delirious following a Tiger Driver. Later on The Latin American Xchange defeated Black and Jacobs, Chris Hero and Davey Richards and ROH World Tag Team Champions Kevin Steen and El Generico in the company's first ever 30 Minute Four Team Iron Man match.

On October 25, in Edison, New Jersey at "Ring Of Homicide 2", Jimmy Jacobs defeated Austin Aries in an Anything Goes match with The End Time after Delirious and debuting member Brodie Lee came to assist him. The team of Lee and Delirious then defeated Cheech and Cloudy. Later on Tyler Black defeated Jerry Lynn.

On November 7, 2008, in Montreal at "The French Connection", Necro Butcher defeated Brodie Lee via DQ when Jacobs and Black ran down and attacked him. Afterward all three beat Necro down and left him laying. Later on Jerry Lynn pinned Delirious with the Cradle Piledriver, and Austin Aries and Bryan Danielson defeated Jacobs and Black when Aries forced Jacobs to submit the Last Chancery. Post match there was dissension between AotF members when Jacobs blamed Black for the loss, then the two left the ring without exchanging words.

On November 8, 2008, in Markham, Ontario at "Bound By Hate", Rhett Titus and Kenny King defeated Delirious and Brodie Lee via Count Out after they beat and chased Titus to the back with King remaining the legal man in the ring. Later on Austin Aries defeated Jacobs in a Dog Collar match via submission with a chain-assisted Last Chancery. Tyler Black attempted to give assistance but Jacobs sent him back to the locker room. Also Bryan Danielson defeated Black and Kenny Omega in a Three Way Dance when he forced Omega to submit to the Cattle Mutilation.

On November 21, 2008, in Dayton, Ohio at "Escalation", ROH World Tag Team Champions Kevin Steen and El Generico defeated Jacobs and Delirious to retain while Austin Aries defeated Black and ROH World Champion Nigel McGuinness in a non-title Three Way Dance by pinning Black.

On November 22, 2008, in Chicago Ridge, Illinois, at "Rising Above 2008", Delirious pinned Rhett Titus with the Shadows Over Hell and post-match beat him down further and destroyed his Top of the Class trophy. On the same night MsChif pinned Sara Del Rey with the Desecrator to retain her SHIMMER Championship and Austin Aries defeated Jimmy Jacobs in an "I Quit" match with a crossface while striking him in the face with his own spike to win their feud. Lacey returned to oppose Tyler Black and after almost throwing in the towel for Aries, she, at the end of the match, prevented Black from throwing in his towel for Jacobs, who therefore was forced to verbally submit to Aries. After the match Jacobs screamed at Black, who then left the ring and went to the back by himself. Later in the show's main event the returning Samoa Joe defeated Black via submission with the rear naked choke.

On December 5, 2008, in Collinsville, Illinois at "Wrestling At The Gateway", Jacobs and Delirious fought Necro Butcher and Ace Steel in a tag team match, which they lost due to interference from Daizee Haze. Haze convinced Delirious not spike Necro which led to Steel and Butcher winning the match as a result. Later that night, Austin Aries told Tyler Black that he didn't know why he still hung around with Jacobs, and that he could be a star and popular with the fans if Jacobs wasn't stopping him. The two had a match which Black won with a small package driver. Both men received standing ovations from the crowd.

On December 6, 2008, in Nashville at "Southern Hostility", Delirious defeated Alex Payne with the Shadows Over Hell while Jacobs and Black fought Aries and Necro to a double count-out in a tag team match.

At Final Battle 2008 on December 27 in New York City, Austin Aries defeated Tyler Black to become the number one contender to the ROH World Championship after Jacobs went down to ringside and distracted him. Afterward, Black was attacked by both Jacobs and Aries, officially leading to Black's departure from the group.

==== 2009 ====
On January 16, 2009, in Manassas, Virginia at "Full Circle", Necro Butcher pinned Delirious with the Tiger Driver. Near the end of the bout Jimmy Jacobs had handed Delirious his spike but Daizee Haze came out and convinced him to hand it over to her leading to his loss. Later, Jacobs pinned Bryan Danielson with a cradle pin off an attempted Triangle Choke hold.

On January 17, 2009, in Edison, New Jersey at "Injustice II", Delirious defeated Necro Butcher, Damien Wayne, and Sean Denny in a Four Corners Survival Match when he pinned Denny with Shadows over Hell. Later Jay Briscoe defeated Jacobs and Austin Aries in a Three Way Dance when he pinned Jacobs with a roll up after Jacobs accidentally speared Aries.

On March 13, 2009, in Collinsville, Illinois at "Stylin' and Profilin'", Delirious turned on Jacobs and broke away from the stable and was embraced by Daizee Haze afterwards. The following night in Indianapolis, IN at "Insanity Unleashed", Jacobs defeated Delirious in a No Disqualification match with the End Time.

After several months of little activity it was believed that the Age of the Fall had disbanded. Jimmy Jacobs was even announced as being the former leader of the Age of the Fall. However, on June 26, 2009, in Detroit at "Violent Tendencies", after Tyler Black had defeated Jimmy Jacobs in a steel cage match, over a dozen men dressed in black clothing and black masks climbed into the cage and attacked Black. While the chaos ensued Jimmy Jacobs proclaimed that the Age of the Fall was not over, it had just begun. Jimmy Jacobs was then carried out of the arena by the Age of the Fall members. The following night in Chicago Ridge, Illinois at "End Of An Age", after KENTA had defeated Black, Jacobs and his followers attacked again and tried to hang him by his ankles upside down above the ring. Kevin Steen, El Generico and Delirious ran in to make the save and in the end Jacobs wound up hanging above the ring with Black declaring that the Age of the Fall had died.

=== Full Impact Pro ===
On February 16, 2008, at Redefined the stable crossed over to ROH's sister promotion Full Impact Pro (FIP) when Black recruited Lacey and her longtime tag team partner Rain (both of whom in FIP were members of the group YRR [Young, Rich, and Ready for Action]) to the stable. On May 30 at In Full Force, Mr. Milo Beasley and Leva Bates joined the stable. So far Rain is the only member of the FIP AOTF who has also made an appearance in ROH for the group.

AOTF, particularly Tyler Black, had been feuding with The YRR stable over their use of numbers tactics to gain an advantage. Black and Jacobs were unsuccessful at winning the FIP Tag Team Championship in tag-team and 2 out of 3 falls tag team matches due to outside interference from YRR members. The duo of Bates and Rain were however successful in defeating a female team representing the YRR. The feud ended after the 2 out of 3 falls match, and a one on one match between Rain and Mercedes Martinez (hired by the YRR to take out Rain) where Martinez squashed Rain, and gave similar beatings to Bates and Beasley.

On October 11, at Impact of Honor 2 Black defeated Erick Stevens to become the number one contender for the FIP World Heavyweight Championship, held at the time by Go Shiozaki, after using God's Last Gift. Also on the show, MsChif defended her SHIMMER Championship, defeating Rain. Not only was this a match between two AOTF members, the first in the group's history (both women remain in the stable), but the first SHIMMER title defense of MsChif's reign outside of SHIMMER events.

On December 20, Black defeated Shiozaki to win the FIP World Heavyweight Championship.

=== Pro Wrestling Guerrilla ===
On July 6, 2008, at Life During Wartime in Reseda, California, Jacobs and Black defeated the team of El Generico (substituting for Jack Evans) and Roderick Strong to win the PWG World Tag Team Championship.

On August 31, 2008 The Young Bucks (Nick and Matt Jackson) defeated Black and Jacobs to capture the titles.

=== AAW ===
On February 19, 2010, Black and Jacobs reunited and defeated The House of Truth to capture the AAW Tag Team Championship. However they have never referred to themselves as the Age of the Fall. On September 24, 2010, Black and Jacobs lost the titles back to The House of Truth.

== Legacy ==
The Age of the Fall is regarded as one of the most influential factions of Ring of Honor's late 2000s era. The group was notable for its dark, goth, nihilistic presentation and cinematic style, which differed from the traditional wrestling faction format of the time. Led by Jimmy Jacobs, the stable's debut, which featured a controversial video depicting violence and social collapse, immediately established it as one of the promotion's most talked-about acts.

The faction helped elevate several wrestlers who would later achieve greater success in professional wrestling. Tyler Black gained significant exposure as a member of the group before becoming one of WWE's biggest stars as Seth Rollins. Brodie Lee and Jimmy Jacobs also continued to have prominent careers after the group's dissolution, with Lee later finding success in WWE and All Elite Wrestling as Mr. Brodie Lee.

The Age of the Fall's storyline with The Briscoe Brothers and other Ring of Honor wrestlers is often remembered as one of the promotion's defining feuds of the era. The group's use of long-term storytelling, character development, and faction-based narratives became an example of ROH's emphasis on in-ring storytelling combined with character-driven angles.

Although the faction disbanded in 2009, the Age of the Fall has remained a notable part of Ring of Honor history and is frequently mentioned among the promotion's most memorable stables.

== Members ==
*	Founding member
L	Leader(s)
M	Manager
V	Valet

Member		Joined	Left
Jimmy Jacobs	*L	September 15, 2007	June 27, 2009
Tyler Black	*	September 15, 2007	December 27, 2008
Necro Butcher	*	September 15, 2007	July 25, 2008
Lacey	*M	September 15, 2007	April 19, 2008
Allison Wonderland	V	November 30, 2007	September 14, 2008
Joey Matthews		January 25, 2008	March 16, 2008
Mr. Milo Beasley (FIP)		February 16, 2008	October 11, 2008
MsChif		February 16, 2008	June 27, 2009
Rain (FIP)		February 16, 2008	October 25, 2008
Zach Gowen		February 22, 2008	October 25, 2008
Leva Bates (FIP)		May 30, 2008	June 27, 2009
Delirious		August 15, 2008	March 13, 2009
Brodie Lee		October 25, 2008	June 27, 2009

== Championships and accomplishments ==
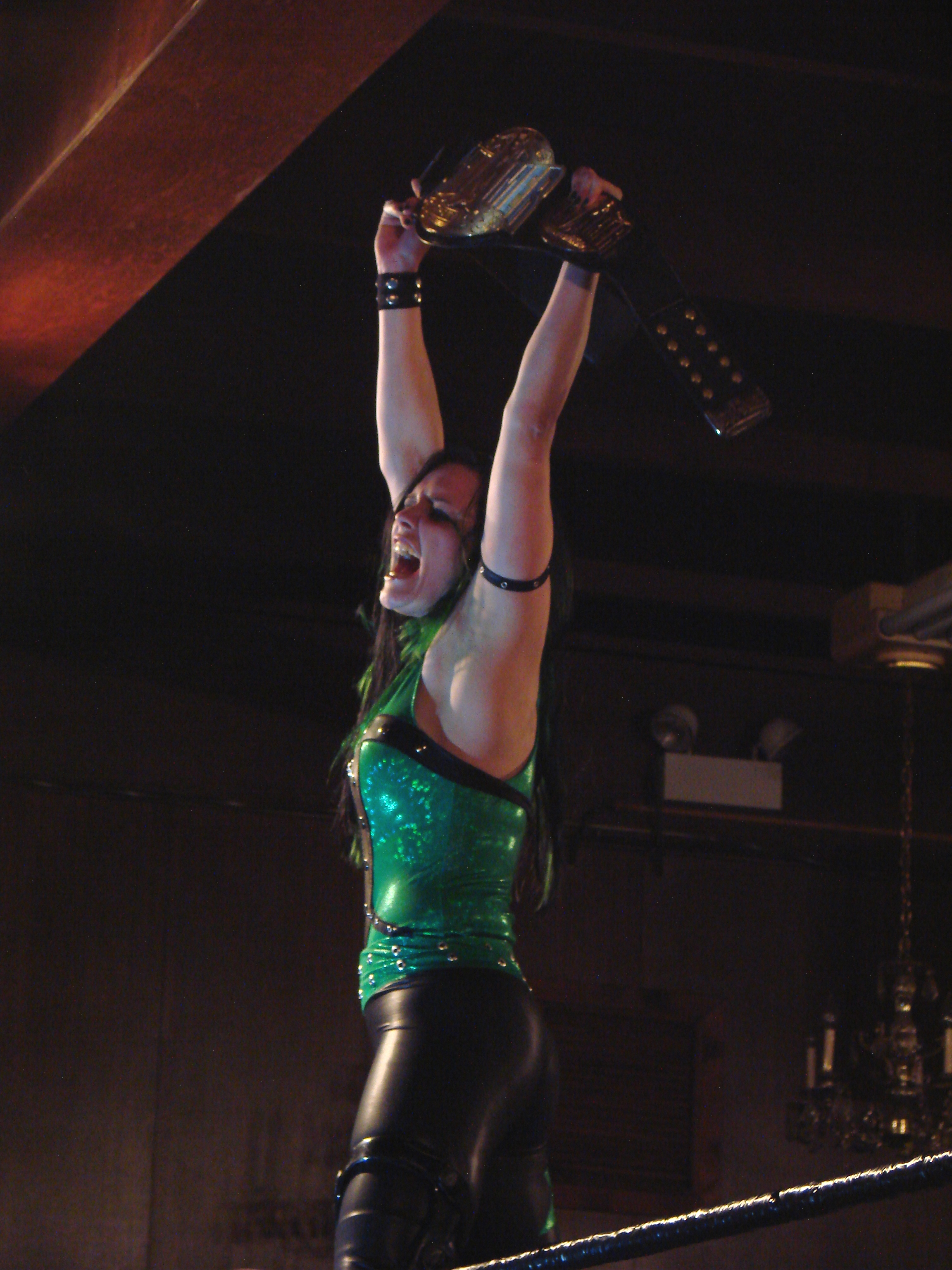
MsChif during her reign as Shimmer Champion.

- All American Wrestling
  - AAW Heavyweight Championship (1 time) – Black
  - AAW Heritage Championship (1 time) – Jacobs
  - AAW Tag Team Championship (1 time) – Jacobs and Black
- Full Impact Pro
  - FIP World Heavyweight Championship (1 time) – Black
- Independent Wrestling Association Mid-South
  - IWA Mid-South Light Heavyweight Championship (1 time) – Jacobs
- Mr. Chainsaw Productions Wrestling
  - MCPW World Championship (1 time) – Jacobs
- Pro Wrestling Guerrilla
  - PWG World Tag Team Championship (1 time) – Jacobs and Black
- Ring of Honor
  - ROH World Tag Team Championship (2 times) – Jacobs and Black
  - ROH World Tag Team Championship Tournament (2008) – Jacobs and Black
- Shimmer Women Athletes
  - Shimmer Championship (1 time) – MsChif
