= Luis Magana =

American boxing and professional wrestling commentator

Luis Magana (June 21, 1910 – March 23, 2008) was a boxing announcer as well as a professional wrestling announcer and color commentator. He also wrote Boxing articles for various newspapers. He was active in the Los Angeles area in at least one of these capacities from the 1920s to the 1980s.

Louie known and respected as "Mr. Olympic" worked at the Olympic Auditorium for Cal and Aileen Eaton from opening day until its closure in the late 1980s. As a color commentator for Las Luchas Libres and for boxing as well on Spanish language radio. He wrote articles for the La Opinion and was inducted into the World Boxing Hal of Fame on November 9, 1993.
