= Ruckus (wrestler) =

American professional wrestler

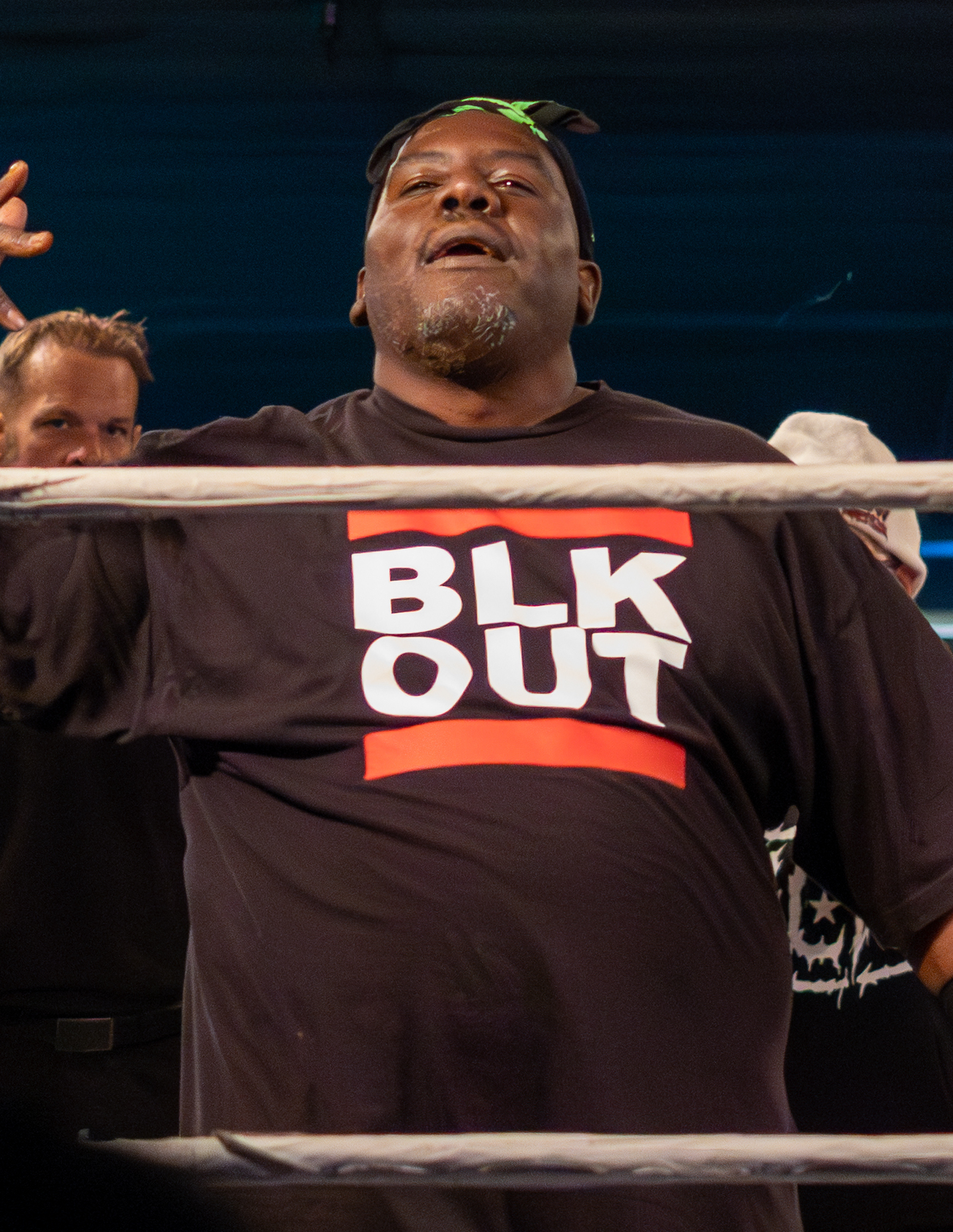
- Ruckus in May 2026

Personal information
- Born: Claude Marrow Jr. August 15, 1978 (age 48) Baltimore, Maryland, U.S.

Professional wrestling career
- Ring name: Ruckus
- Billed height: 5 ft 8 in (1.73 m)
- Billed weight: 235 lb (107 kg)
- Billed from: Baltimore, Maryland
- Trained by: Chad Austin; Bob Starr; Brainbusters Wrestling School
- Debut: February 26, 1999

Claude Marrow Jr. (born August 15, 1978), better known by his ring name Ruckus, is an American professional wrestler. He has performed in Combat Zone Wrestling, Ring of Honor, Maryland Championship Wrestling, Chikara and Jersey All Pro Wrestling. While often appearing at a number of other independent promotions, Ruckus is a member of the Blackout/BLKOUT stable with Eddie Kingston, Sabian, Joker, James Ellsworth, and Robbie Mireno.

== Professional wrestling career ==
Ruckus began training in September 1998 at Brainbusters. A former backyard wrestler with Hardcore Championship Wrestling, Ruckus made his professional wrestling debut against Chad Austin on April 18, 1999, for the Mid-Eastern Wrestling Federation (MEWF).

=== Combat Zone Wrestling (2001–2007) ===
Ruckus and The Hurricane Kidd were hired by Combat Zone Wrestling (CZW) when owner John Zandig saw them working for Power House Wrestling and was impressed by their ability. When Ruckus started in CZW, he weighed nearly 300 lbs, but has since dropped over 75 pounds.

He began wrestling in CZW around 2001 and became known for doing high flying moves, such as the 450 Splash, that are not normally done by people of his size. He won his first title, the CZW World Junior Heavyweight Championship, on December 2, 2001, but only held it briefly, dropping the title at Cage of Death III to Trent Acid. He regained this title on January 18, 2003, at Live Again. During his second reign, Ruckus began teaming with Sonjay Dutt. They wrestled many matches as a team, but Ruckus became jealous of Sonjay and turned on him at Night of Infamy 2. This led to a match at Cage of Death V which Sonjay won to become the new Junior Heavyweight Champion.

In the early 2000s, as a member of the stable CZW Warriors (CZW Army), Ruckus toured all over Japan, including Kanagawa, Tokyo, Hokkaido, Ibaraki, Miyagi, Yamagata, Shizuoka, with the promotion Big Japan Pro Wrestling, facing several wrestlers including Trent Acid, The Winger, Fantastic, Ryuji Ito, John Zandig, Shadow WX, Daikokubo Benkei, Abdullah Kobayashi, Van Hammer, Hideki Hosaka, Kamikaze, Shunma Matsuzaki, Naoki Numazawa, Nick Gage, teaming on several occasions with Wifebeater, Madman Pondo, Jun Kasai, Justice Pain, BADBOY Hido, Fantastic, Ryuji Ito, and won the BJW Junior Heavyweight Championship in December 2001 in Yokohama.

In 2004, Ruckus and Robbie Mireno formed a stable called The Blackout (The BLKOUT). The stable also featured Sabian and Joker and they feuded with Chri$ Ca$h. Eddie Kingston would later join them. On June 12, 2004, Ruckus and Sabian won the CZW World Tag Team Championship from Gage and Nate Hatred at Trifecta Elimination 2. Ruckus competed in the Cage of Death match at Cage of Death VI against Team Ca$h. Not only was Ruckus eliminated, but his team also lost the CZW Tag Team Title.

On February 5, 2005, at Only The Strong, Ruckus defeated Messiah for the CZW World Heavyweight Championship. He held the title for quite some time, defending it against wrestlers such as Sonjay Dutt, B-Boy, SeXXXy Eddy, and Beef Wellington. Later in 2005, Ruckus and the rest of the BLKOUT began a feud with The Kings of Wrestling and Super Dragon. At Night of Infamy 4, Ruckus successfully defended the title against Claudio Castagnoli. At the next show, Cage of Death 7, Ruckus lost the title to Super Dragon.

Ruckus, Sabian, and Kingston won a six-man tag match against the Kings and Super Dragon at An Afternoon of Main Events on January 14, 2006. At CZW's next show, Ruckus regained the World Championship, with his allies Joker and Kingston bringing home the tag team title. On May 13, 2006, Ruckus won the Best of the Best tournament by defeating Sabian, Claudio Castagnoli, and Austin Aries in the final match. After Ruckus won the tournament, Chris Hero came out demanded a title shot and defeated Ruckus for the championship. In August 2006, Kingston was kicked out of the BLKOUT and his half of the title was given to Ruckus, making Ruckus and Joker the new champions. Once Joker left CZW, however, the BLKOUT was stripped of the title. The same night they were stripped, Ruckus and the debuting Ricky Reyes helped Kingston win the World Championship and welcomed him back into the fold.

At the Best of the Best tournament on July 14, 2007, Ruckus beat reigning CZW champion Justice Pain for the CZW World Heavyweight Title in a surprise non-tournament match. Later that night, the now three-time CZW Heavyweight Champion, Ruckus, joined his tag partner Sabian in ring to award their BLKOUT enforcer, Joker, the Best of the Best trophy he won by defeating B-Boy in the evening's final match.

On December 8, 2007, at CZW Cage of Death IX, Ruckus lost the CZW World Heavyweight Title to the returning Gage in a Triple Threat match also featuring the returning Messiah.

=== Ring of Honor and the independent circuit (2007–present) ===
At Manhattan Mayhem II on August 25, 2007, Ruckus made his Ring of Honor debut, coming in as the first member of Jack Evans's faction "The Vulture Squad", and defeated Eddie Edwards. On July 26, 2008, Ruckus won the first ever 15 man Honor Rumble to earn a title shot against Nigel McGuinness in Manassas, VA on August 1, a match which McGuinness ultimately won to retain his title.

Since his debut, Ruckus has also spread his talents to numerous countries including England, Mexico, Japan, Canada, Italy and Germany, as well as making appearances in a variety of feds along the east coast and inland. In 2006, Ruckus made his debut for other northeast feds, such as Chikara and Jersey All Pro Wrestling. He was still very much involved with the BLK OUT in CZW, where they engaged in a war over the CZW Tag Team Title with NWA-Anarchy's Kory "Rainman" Chavis and Onyx, who claimed they were the original Blackout.

In 2006, Ruckus taped episodes of MTV's Wrestling Society X, forming a team with Babi Slymm known as "Keepin' It Gangsta".

On September 6, 2008, Ruckus would make his debut for Insanity Pro Wrestling at the 8th Annual Super Junior Heavyweight Tournament. Ruckus would win the first round defeating Jayson Quick but would lose in the second round in a triple threat match also involving Shiima Xion and Aaron Williams.

The MCW Tag Team Championship was awarded to both Ruckus and Sabian on April 21, 2007, when they defeated MCW champions Phat Blues Inc. (Kelly Bell and Buzz Stryker) and The Best of Both Worlds (Doyle Day and Buck Chyld). On May 19, 2007, Ruckus beat Christopher Daniels for the German Wrestling Promotion's World Heavyweight Championship belt in Germany. On February 21, 2009, he won the Maryland Championship Heavyweight title from Christian York in a cage match. He lost the title on April 25, 2014.

== Other media ==
He appeared in the video game Backyard Wrestling 2: There Goes the Neighborhood.

== Championships and accomplishments ==
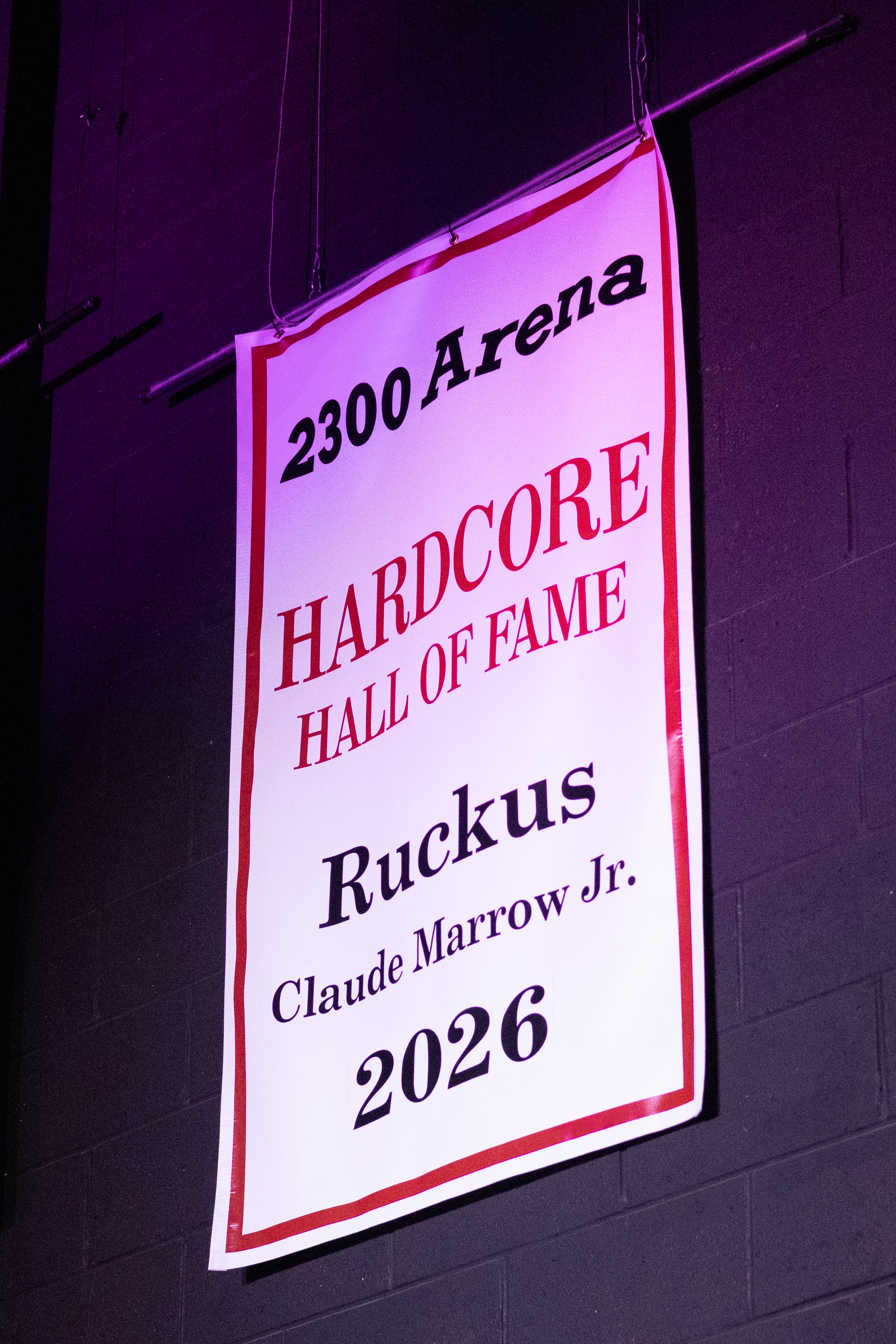
Ruckus' Hardcore Hall of Fame banner T the 2300 Arena.

- Adrenaline Championship Wrestling
  - ACW Heavyweight Championship (1 time)
  - ACW Tag Team Championship (3 time, current)– with James Ellsworth (1) and Robby Illuminati (3, current)
- Assault Wrestling Alliance
  - AWA Merciless Championship (1 time, inaugural)
- Atomic Championship Wrestling
  - ACW Heavyweight Championship (1 time)
  - ACW Tag Team Championships (1 time, final) - with Robby Illuminati
- Big Japan Pro Wrestling
  - BJW Junior Heavyweight Championship (1 time)
- Combat Zone Wrestling
  - CZW World Heavyweight Championship (3 times)
  - CZW World Junior Heavyweight Championship (2 times)
  - CZW World Tag Team Championship (5 times) – with Sabian/BLK Jeez
  - CZW Best of the Best 6
  - Second Triple Crown Champion
  - CZW Hall of Fame (Class of 2015)
- Extreme Rising
  - Extreme Rising Match of the Year (2012) vs. The Briscoe Brothers vs. Dramáticos
  - Extreme Rising Tag Team of the Year (2012) with Blk Jeez.
- German Wrestling Promotion
  - GWP World Heavyweight Championship (2 times, inaugural)
  - GWP World Heavyweight Championship Tournament (2007)
- Hardcore Hall of Fame
  - Class of 2026
- Independent Wrestling Association Mid-South
  - Simply the Best Tournament (2006)
- Indie Wrestling Hall of Fame
  - Class of 2022
- Maryland Championship Wrestling
  - MCW Heavyweight Championship (1 time)
  - MCW Cruiserweight Championship (1 time)
  - MCW Tag Team Championship (2 times) – with Sabian (1) and Christian York (1)
  - MCW Rage Television Championship (1 time)
  - Shane Shamrock Memorial Cup (2006)
- Mid-Eastern Wrestling Federation
  - MEWF Mid-Atlantic Championship (1 time)
  - MEWF Maryland Championship (1 time)
  - MEWF Tag Team Championship (1 time) – with The Natural
  - MEWF Light Heavyweight Championship (1 time)
- National Championship Wrestling
  - NCW Tag Team Championship (1 time) – with Kid Kattrell
- Nittany Valley Wrestling
  - NVW Heavyweight Championship (2 times)
- Power House Wrestling
  - PHW Intercontinental Championship (1 time)
- Pro Wrestling Illustrated
  - Ranked No. 199 of the top 500 singles wrestlers in the PWI 500 in 2008
- Ring of Honor
  - Honor Rumble (2008)
