= Driven =

Driven may refer to:

== Human behavior ==
- Motivated, based on, for example:
- Ambition
- Desire (philosophy)
- Work ethic

== Arts, entertainment, and media ==
=== Books ===
- Driven (novel), a 2012 novel by James Sallis
- Driven, a 2013 memoir by Donald Driver

=== Films ===
- Driven (1916 film), a British silent film
- Driven (1923 film), an American silent film
- Driven (1996 film), an American film directed by Michael Shoob
- Driven (2001 film), an American film starring Sylvester Stallone
- Driven (2017 film), a Pakistani crime film
- Driven (2018 film) a film about the life of John DeLorean, founder of the DeLorean Motor Company

=== Music ===
- The Driven, an Irish rock band
- Driven (Cueshé album), 2008 album
- Driven (Orphanage album), 2004 album
- "Driven" (Rush song), a song by Canadian rock band Rush from their 1996 album Test For Echo
- "Driven" (Sevendust song), a single from the album Alpha by the heavy metal band Sevendust

=== Television ===
- Driven (TV series), a British motoring programme
- "Driven" (CSI: Miami), an episode of CSI: Miami
- "Driven" (NCIS), an episode of NCIS
- ROH Driven, a professional wrestling pay-per-view event

=== Other uses in arts, entertainment, and media ===
- Driven (Canadian magazine), a men's lifestyle magazine
- Driven (video game), a 2001 racing game
- Driven, a cancelled sequel to the video game Pyst

== Wrestling ==
- Driven (2007), a professional wrestling event
- Driven (2008), the second annual Driven professional wrestling event

== See also ==
- Driven to Destruction (disambiguation)
- Driven to Distraction (disambiguation)
