= Cueshé discography =

- Studio albums: 4
- Compilation albums: 4
- Singles: 14

This is the discography of the Filipino band Cueshé.

== Albums ==
=== Studio albums ===
Year	Album title	Certifications
2005	Half Empty Half Full: Released: December 2005; Label: Sony BMG Philippines	2× Platinum
2006	Back to Me: Released: August 2006; Label: Sony BMG Philippines	Gold
2008	Driven: Released: April 7, 2008; Label: Sony BMG Philippines	—
2010	Life: Released: September 1, 2010; Label: Sony BMG Philippines	—

=== Compilation appearances ===
2005 – UltraelectromagneticJam
2006 – Mga Awit Kapuso: The Best of GMA TV Themes Vol. 3
2006 – Hopia Mani Popcorn: The Best of Manila Sound Vol. 2
2009 – The Best of Mga Awit Kapuso

== Singles ==
Year	Title	Album
2005	"Stay"	Half Empty Half Full
2005	"Sorry"	Half Empty Half Full
2005	"Ulan"	Half Empty Half Full
2006	"Can't Let You Go"	Half Empty Half Full
2006	"24 Hours"	Half Empty Half Full
2006	"Back to Me"	Back to Me
2006	"Borrowed Time"	Back to Me
2007	"Bakit?"	Back to Me
2007	"Pasensiya Na"	Back to Me
2007	"Walang Yamang (Mas Hihigit Sa 'Yo)"	
2008	"BMD"	Driven
2008	"There Was You"	Driven
2009	"Minsan"	Driven
2010	"Pangako"	Life
2011	"Lupit"	Life
2011	"Still" ^{1}	Life
2015	"Ikaw Lamang"	

^{1} Radio-only single

=== Cover versions ===
- "Hard to Believe" (2005) (original by Eraserheads)
- "Laki sa Layaw" (2009) (original by Mike Hanopol)
