= Sami Zayn =

Canadian professional wrestler (born 1984)

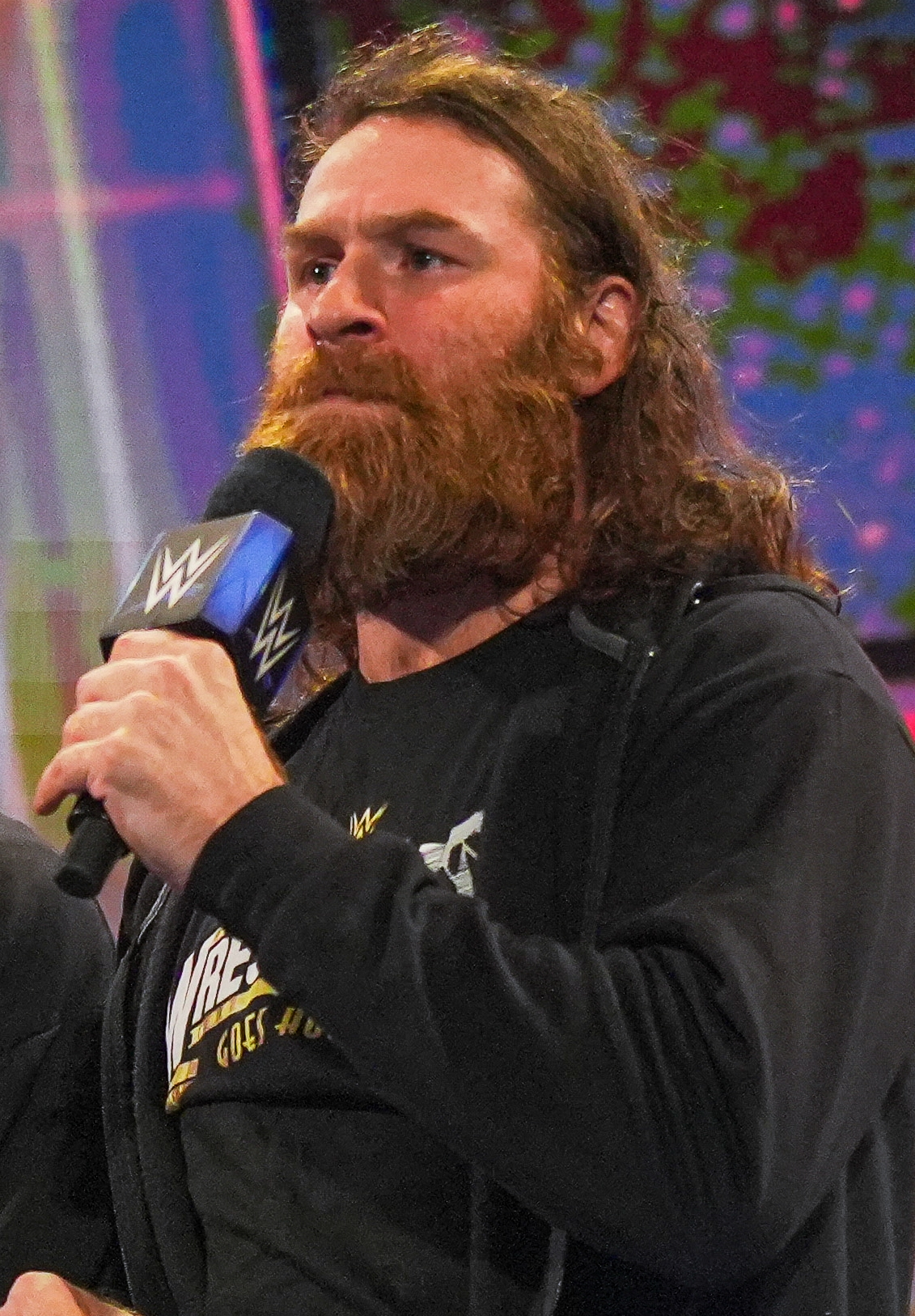
- Zayn in 2023

Personal information
- Born: Rami Sebei; July 12, 1984 (age 42) Laval, Quebec, Canada
- Spouse: Khadija Sebei (m. 2018)
- Children: 1

Professional wrestling career
- Ring name(s): Big Larry; El Generico; Rami Sebei; Sami Zayn; Stevie McFly
- Billed height: 6 ft 1 in (185 cm)
- Billed weight: 212 lb (96 kg)
- Billed from: Montreal, Quebec, Canada; Tijuana, Mexico
- Trained by: Jerry Tuite; Savio Vega
- Debut: March 1, 2002

Rami Sebei (Arabic: رامي السباعي; born July 12, 1984) is a Canadian professional wrestler. He has been signed to WWE since January 2013, where he performs on the SmackDown brand under the ring name Sami Zayn, and is the current Undisputed WWE Champion in his second reign.

Sebei made his professional wrestling debut in 2002 under the ring name Stevie McFly, before adopting the ring name El Generico, wrestling as a masked luchador. From 2002 to 2013 he was a prominent figure on the independent circuit, winning many championships in several promotions including International Wrestling Syndicate (IWS), Pro Wrestling Guerrilla (PWG), Ring of Honor (ROH), Westside Xtreme Wrestling (wXw) and DDT Pro-Wrestling. In several of these he held the promotion's top title, including winning the PWG World Championship on two occasions.

Sebei signed with WWE in January 2013, taking on the ring name Sami Zayn, and began wrestling without a mask in WWE's developmental brand NXT, where he won the NXT Championship. After being promoted to the main roster, he became a two-time Undisputed WWE Champion, four-time WWE Intercontinental Champion, two-time WWE United States Champion, and one-time Undisputed WWE Tag Team Champion with Kevin Owens. From April 2022 to January 2023, he was involved with The Bloodline stable. In June 2026, he became WWE's 36th Triple Crown Champion and overall 26th Grand Slam Champion. (Note: 19th under the current modern format.)

== Early life ==
Rami Sebei was born on July 12, 1984, in Laval, Quebec, Canada, to Syrian migrants who relocated from Homs to Laval in the 1970s.

== Professional wrestling career ==
=== International Wrestling Syndicate (2002–2009) ===
Sebei made his professional wrestling debut on March 1, 2002, for the FLQ promotion in Quebec as Stevie McFly. On July 14, as El Generico, he made his International Wrestling Syndicate (IWS) debut at Scarred For Life in a count out victory. On October 18, 2003, at Blood, Sweat and Beers, Pierre Carl Ouellet defeated Generico and Kevin Steen in a triple threat match.

On November 15, at Payback's A Bitch, El Generico defeated Steen in their first-ever singles match against each other. IWS held its fifth-anniversary show "V" on June 15, 2004, at Le SPAG, where Generico defeated PCO to win his first IWS World Heavyweight Championship, only to have Steen cash in his number one contendership (won earlier in the night against Excess 69) and defeat Generico for the title. On September 11, at CZW High Stakes II, Generico, Steen and Excess 69 lost to SeXXXy Eddy in an IWS four-way match which was unofficially chosen as "CZW Match of the Year".

On February 16, 2008, Generico defeated Steen for the IWS World Heavyweight Championship at Violent Valentine. He lost the title on March 22, at Know Your Enemies, to Steen in a three-way match also involving Max Boyer.

=== Pro Wrestling Guerrilla (2004–2013) ===
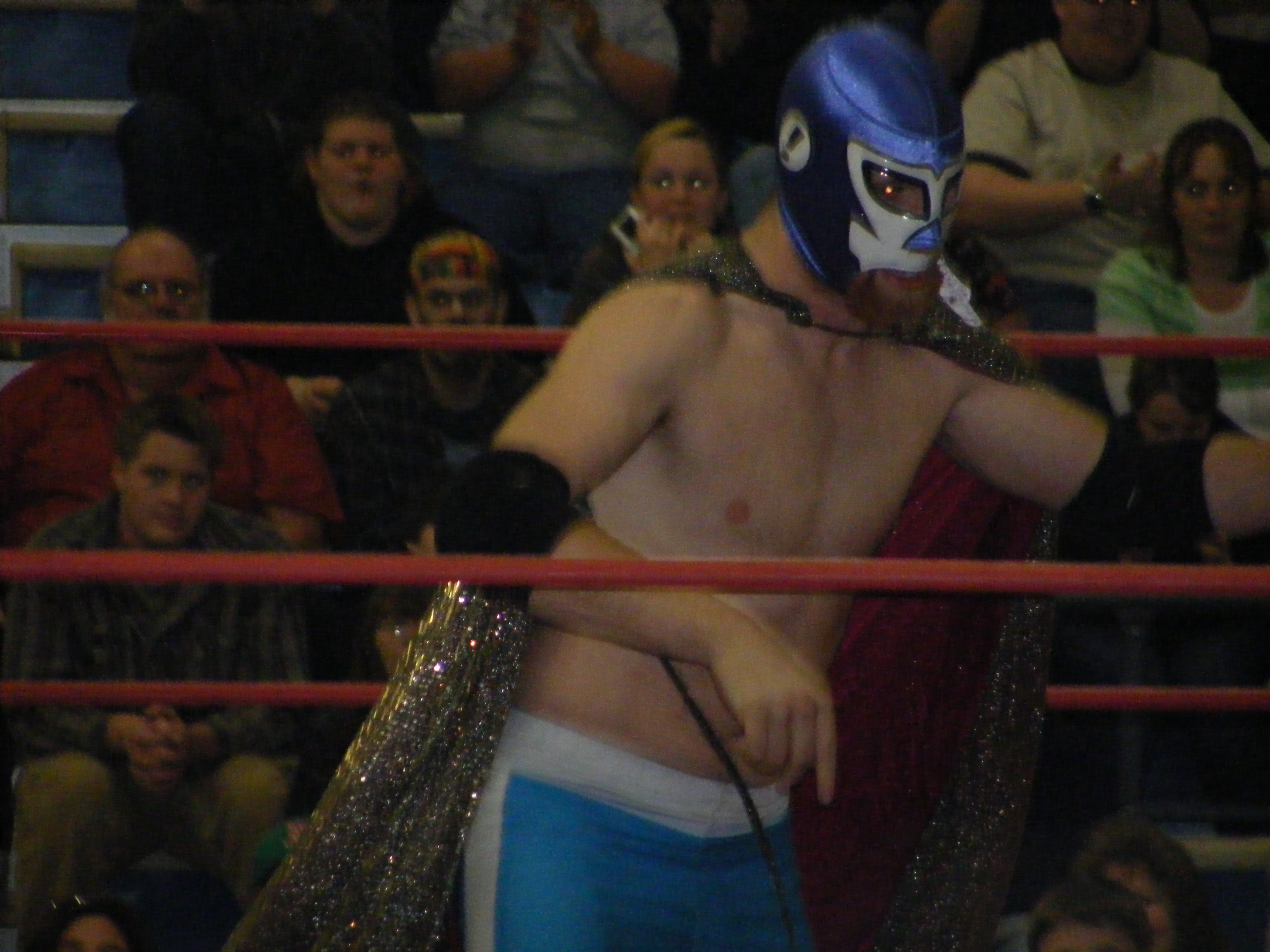
El Generico at an All Pro Wrestling (APW) event in 2008

In 2004, El Generico began making appearances in the independent promotion Pro Wrestling Guerrilla (PWG). El Generico held the PWG World Tag Team Championship five times with four different partners: with Human Tornado as 2 Skinny Black Guys, Quicksilver as Cape Fear, Kevin Steen, and Paul London as ¡Peligro Abejas!. Generico is also the only participant to consecutively appear in the first eight Battle of Los Angeles tournaments from 2005. On February 24, 2007, Generico defeated former partner Tornado to win the PWG World Championship during his title run with Cape Fear. Later that year, while Generico was still World Champion, he and Steen defeated PAC and Roderick Strong for the belts.

In mid-2009, Generico entered a lengthy feud with the tag team Men of Low Moral Fiber, consisting of Kenny Omega and Chuck Taylor, recruiting Colt Cabana, referee Rick Knox, and former partner Human Tornado (effectively reuniting 2 Skinny Black Guys) to stand by his side. At PWG's sixth anniversary event, Threemendous II, 2 Skinny Black Guys defeated current champions The Young Bucks in a non-title match, giving the Bucks their first tag team loss in almost a year and a half. On November 21, on Night 2 of the 2009 Battle of Los Angeles, Generico and Kevin Steen failed to win the titles from the Bucks.

On May 9, 2010, Generico teamed up with Paul London as ¡Peligro Abejas! (translated as Danger Bees!) in the fourth annual Dynamite Duumvirate Tag Team Title Tournament eight-team tag tournament. After defeating Chuck Taylor and Scott Lost in the first round and the Briscoe Brothers (Jay and Mark) in the semifinals, Generico and London defeated the Young Bucks in the finals of the tournament to not only win DDT4, but also the PWG World Tag Team Championship, Generico's fifth time holding the title. On December 11, El Generico earned himself a shot at the PWG World Championship when ¡Peligro Abejas! successfully defended the PWG World Tag Team Championship against Kings of Wrestling (Chris Hero and PWG World Champion Claudio Castagnoli). Generico received his shot at the PWG World Championship on January 29, 2011, during the WrestleReunion 5 weekend, but was defeated by Castagnoli. On April 9, El Generico teamed with Ricochet, who filled in for London who was unable to appear at the event, where they lost the PWG World Tag Team Championship back to The Young Bucks. On August 20, Generico entered the 2011 Battle of Los Angeles, defeating Castagnoli and Willie Mack in his first round and semifinal matches. Later that night, Generico defeated Steen in the finals to win the tournament, becoming the first person to have won the PWG World and World Tag Team championships as well as the DDT4 and Battle of Los Angeles tournaments and earning a match for Steen's PWG World Championship. On October 22, El Generico defeated Steen in a ladder match, following outside interference from The Young Bucks, to win the PWG World Championship for the second time. On March 17, 2012, El Generico re-lost the title to Steen in a three-way match, which also included Eddie Edwards.

El Generico made his farewell appearance for PWG on January 12, 2013, when he and Steen entered the 2013 Dynamite Duumvirate Tag Team Title Tournament. After wins over the Briscoe Brothers and Future Shock (Adam Cole and Kyle O'Reilly), Generico and Steen were defeated in the finals of the tournament by The Young Bucks.

=== Independent circuit (2005–2013) ===
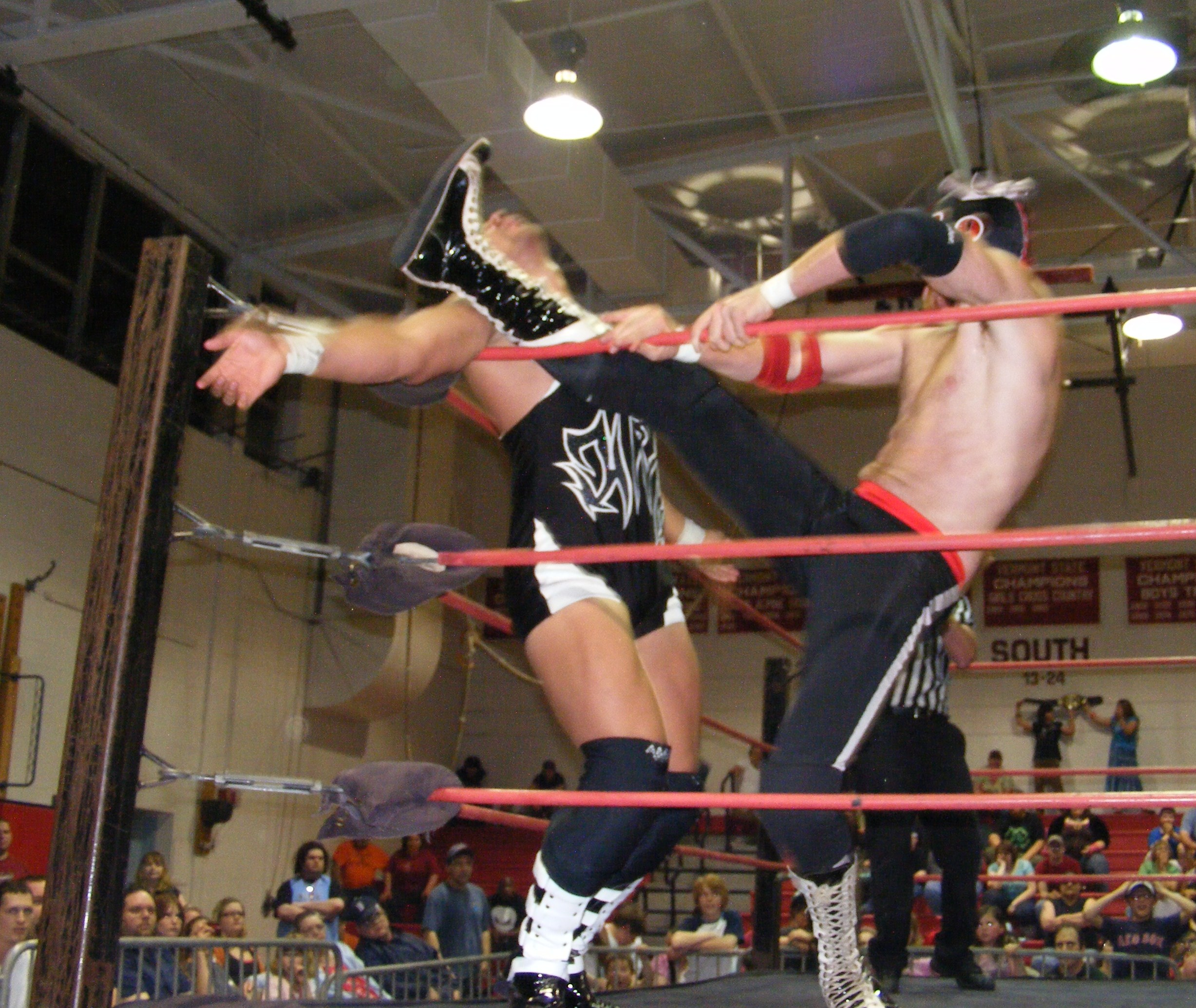
El Generico performing the Olé Kick in 2009

From 2005 onwards, El Generico has made several appearances for the German Westside Xtreme Wrestling (wXw) promotion. On March 4, 2012, El Generico defeated Tommy End to win wXw's 2012 16 Carat Gold Tournament. On May 19, El Generico defeated Big van Walter to win the wXw Unified World Wrestling Championship, which he held until August 12, when he lost to Axel Tischer in a four-way match also involving Bad Bones and Karsten Beck. In October 2009, El Generico traveled to Poland to take part in Do or Die Wrestling's event in Warsaw, defeating Michael Kovac in the main event. In May 2010, Generico competed in the main-event of Capital City Championship Combat's show, Stand Alone. On October 23, Generico competed at Pro Wrestling Superstars' inaugural show in Jacksonville, North Carolina, where he teamed with Paul London to defeat Joey Silvia and Jake Manning.

On January 11, 2011, El Generico wrestled in a tryout dark match for Total Nonstop Action Wrestling (TNA) at the promotion's Impact! tapings, losing to Amazing Red. On April 20, El Generico made his South American debut, when he wrestled for Peruvian promotion Leader Wrestling Association (LWA), facing Apocalipsis, Axl and Kaiser in a number one contender's match to determine a challenger for Caoz, the promotion's "Campeón Máximo", which was won by Kaiser. On April 24, El Generico wrestled for Chilean promotion Xplosion Nacional de Lucha (XNL), losing to Crazy Sid in an XNL Championship number one contender's three-way match, which also included XL. On February 26, 2012, El Generico defeated Ivan "Locomotive" Markov at a show for the Russian promotion Independent Wrestling Federation (IWF). On September 8, Generico made an appearance for Combat Zone Wrestling (CZW), unsuccessfully challenging Masada for the CZW World Heavyweight Championship.

After signing with WWE, El Generico made his final Canadian independent appearance on January 18, 2013, for the Hart Legacy Wrestling (HLW) promotion in Calgary. In the opening four-way elimination match, El Generico and Samuray del Sol were victorious over Cam!kaze and Pete Wilson, Brian Cage and Trent Barreta, and Andrew Hawkes and Ryan Rollins. As a result, the two earned a spot in the main event ten-man tag team match, where they teamed with Barreta, Davey Boy Smith Jr. and Jack Evans in a losing effort against the team of Teddy Hart, Cage, Cam!kaze, Flip Kendrick and Wilson, with Hart pinning Generico.

=== Chikara (2005–2012) ===
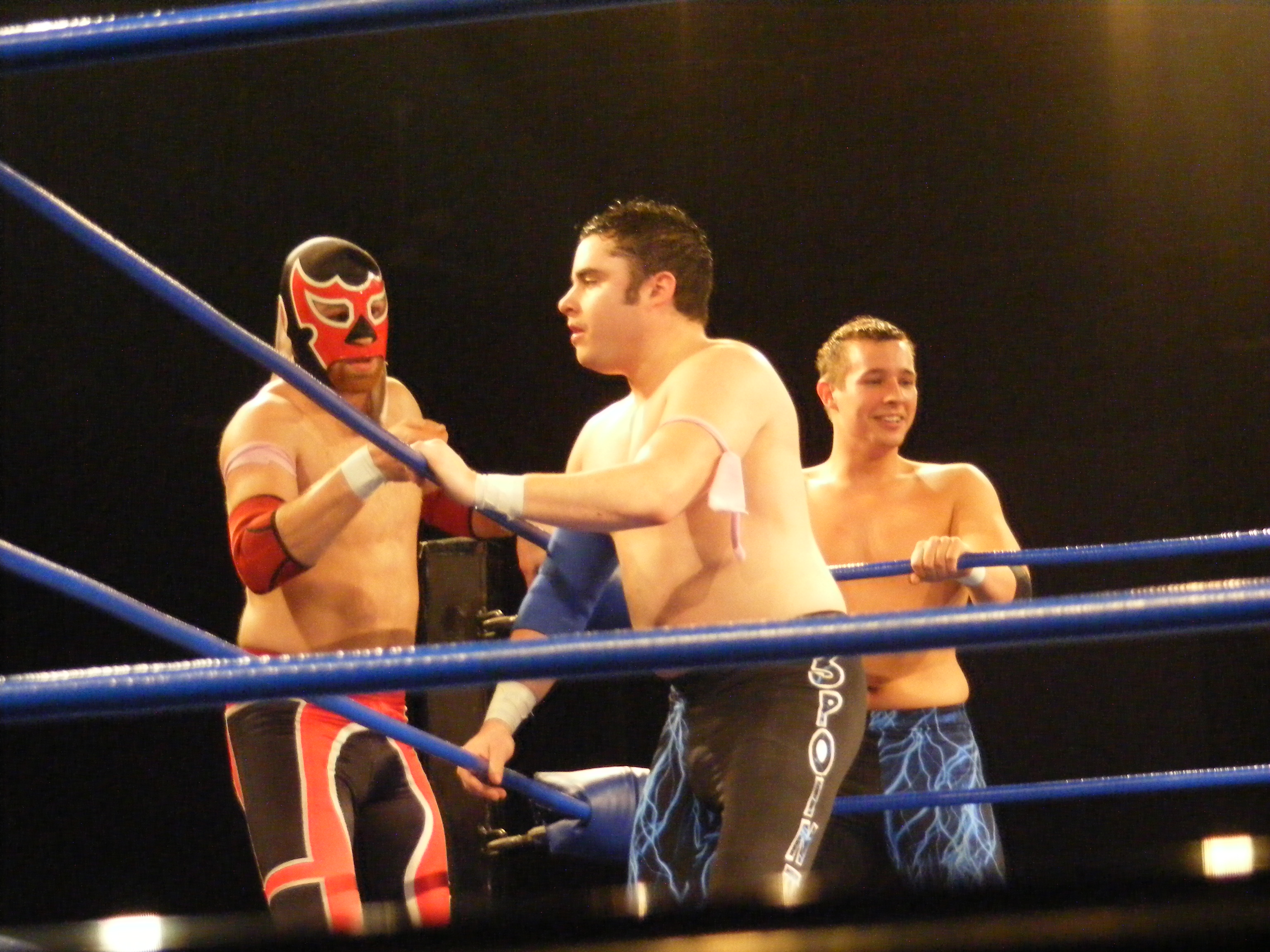
The stable ¡3.0lé! (left to right: El Generico, Shane Matthews, and Scott Parker) during the 2011 King of Trios

On February 19, 2005, El Generico made his debut for Philadelphia, Pennsylvania–based promotion Chikara, taking part in the 2005 Tag World Grand Prix, where he teamed with Steen as Team IWS. The team made it to the quarterfinals of the tournament, before being defeated by the SuperFriends (Chris Hero and Mike Quackenbush).

Three years later, El Generico returned to Chikara to take part in the 2008 King of Trios, where he teamed with Player Uno and Stupefied, again, as Team IWS. After defeating the F1rst Family (Arik Cannon, Darin Corbin and Ryan Cruz) in their first round match on March 1, Team IWS was eliminated from the tournament later that same day by eventual tournament winners Los Luchadores de Mexico (Incognito, Lince Dorado and El Pantera). The following year, on March 27, El Generico returned for the 2009 King of Trios, teaming with Matt and Nick Jackson as Team PWG. They were eliminated from the tournament in the first round by The Osirian Portal (Amasis, Escorpion Egipcio and Ophidian). The following day, El Generico entered the Rey de Voladores tournament, but lost to Kota Ibushi in his four-way elimination semifinal match, which also included Jigsaw and Nick Jackson. On the third night of the tournament, Generico lost to Arik Cannon.

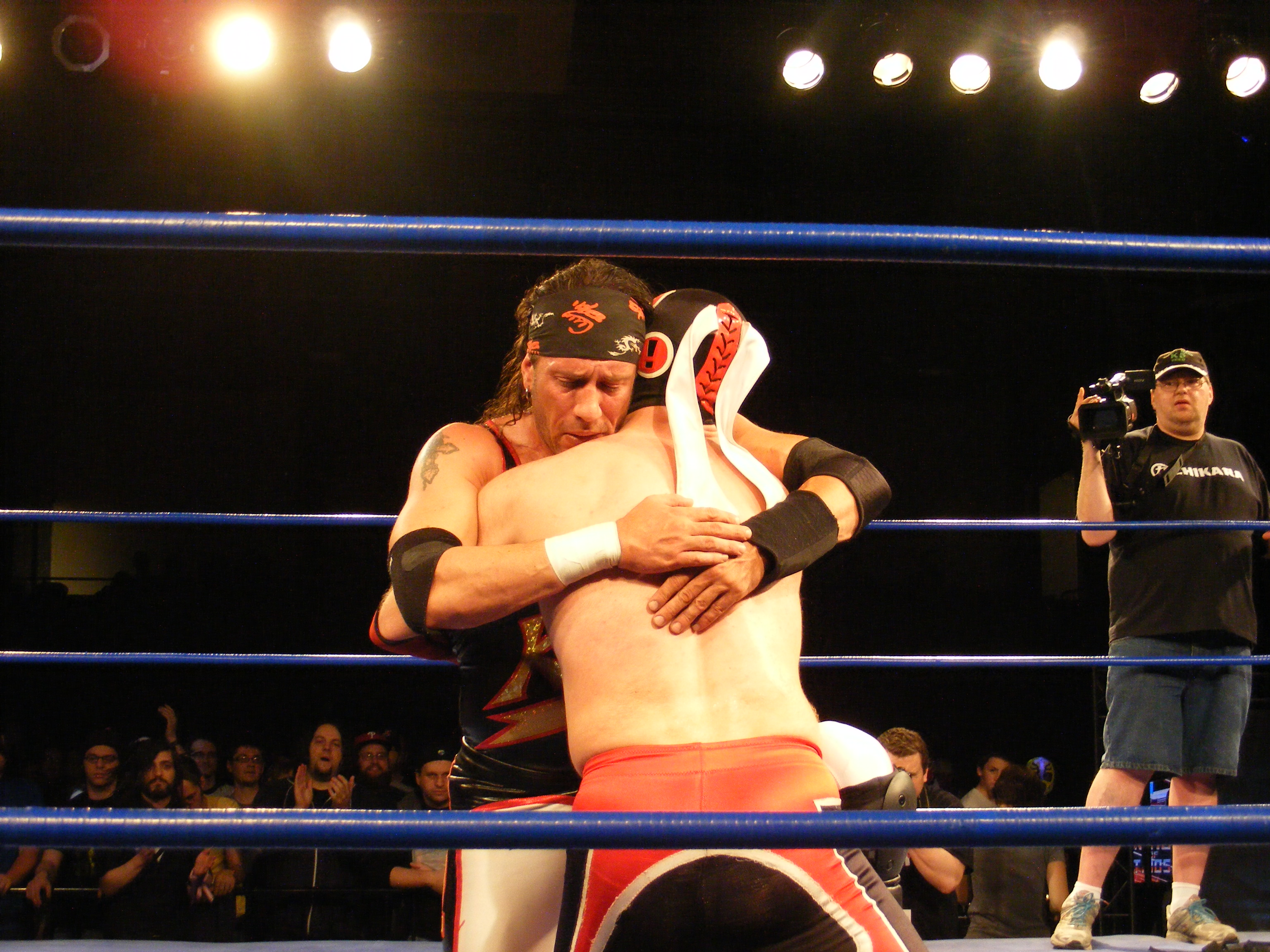
El Generico (right) embracing 1–2–3 Kid after their match at the 2011 King of Trios

El Generico next appeared for Chikara on January 23, 2011, losing to Eddie Kingston. For the 2011 King of Trios, El Generico came together with 3.0 (Scott Parker and Shane Matthews) to form ¡3.0le!. The team was eliminated from the tournament in the first round by The Osirian Portal (Amasis, Hieracon and Ophidian). The following day, Generico entered his second Rey de Voladores and defeated Pinkie Sanchez, Zack Sabre Jr. and Marshe Rockett in his four-way elimination semifinal match to qualify for the following day's finals, where he defeated the 1–2–3 Kid to win the 2011 Rey de Voladores. On July 30, ¡3.0le! defeated F.I.S.T. (Chuck Taylor, Icarus and Johnny Gargano), but lost to the Spectral Envoy (Frightmare, Hallowicked and UltraMantis Black) the following day.

=== Ring of Honor (2004–2012) ===
El Generico first wrestled for Ring of Honor (ROH) at Final Battle on December 26, 2004, as The Weapon Of Mask Destruction #2, where he was defeated by Jay Lethal. He competed in a Four Corner Survival match on February 19, 2005, at Do Or Die IV, but was unsuccessful. Generico teamed with the Ring Crew Express (Dunn and Marcos) in the Trios Tournament 2005, losing to the Rottweilers. Generico lost to Roderick Strong at Stalemate on April 16 and Austin Aries at Fate of an Angel on July 16, but achieved his first victory against Kevin Steen on July 23 at The Homecoming (despite the match not making it onto the event's DVD). After a loss to Homicide on August 27 at Dragon Gate Invasion, Generico was not seen in ROH until he returned on November 25, 2006, at Dethroned, where he was defeated by Brent Albright.

On February 17, 2007, El Generico formed a permanent team with Kevin Steen, facing the Briscoe Brothers at Fifth Year Festival: Philly in a losing effort. On April 14, Mark Briscoe returned in the middle of a match between Generico and Steen and his brother Jay and Erick Stevens at Fighting Spirit. Mark was attacked by the duo, however, and was pinned by Steen after a package piledriver. At Respect is Earned on July 1, Steen and El Generico defeated The Irish Airborne (Jake and Dave Crist), Pelle Primeau and Mitch Franklin, and Jimmy Rave and Adam Pearce in a Tag Team Scramble dark match. That same night, they brawled with the Briscoe Brothers, ending with Mark suffering a mild concussion from a steel chair shot. At Driven on September 21, the Briscoe Brothers defeated Generico and Steen to retain the ROH World Tag Team Championship. At Death Before Dishonor V Night 1 on August 10, they defeated the Briscoes in a non-title Boston Street Fight. Generico and Steen then suffered three consecutive losses to the Briscoes at Caged Rage on August 24 in a steel cage match, Manhattan Mayhem II on August 25 in a two out of three falls match, and Man Up on November 30 in ROH's first-ever ladder match.

In the midst of their feud, Generico emerged as a singles competitor in the 2007 Race to the Top tournament, defeating Delirious, Hero and Davey Richards, before losing to Claudio Castagnoli in the final round. At Up For Grabs on June 6, 2008, Steen and Generico participated in a one night tournament to crown new ROH World Tag Team Champions, defeating Go Shiozaki and ROH World Champion Nigel McGuinness in the first round, Chris Hero and Adam Pearce in the second round, but losing to Jimmy Jacobs and Tyler Black in the finals. On August 15, Generico failed to win the ROH World Championship from McGuinness at Age of Insanity. On September 19, Generico and Steen defeated The Age of the Fall at Driven to win the ROH World Tag Team Championship. Generico again failed to win the title from McGuinness at Glory by Honor VII the next day, in a fatal four-way match at The French Connnection on November 7, and at Caged Collision on January 31, 2009 (which aired on April 17). At a television taping on April 10, Generico and Steen lost the ROH World Tag Team Championship to The American Wolves (Eddie Edwards and Davey Richards). Shortly after, Generico suffered a knee injury, but he returned to action the following month.

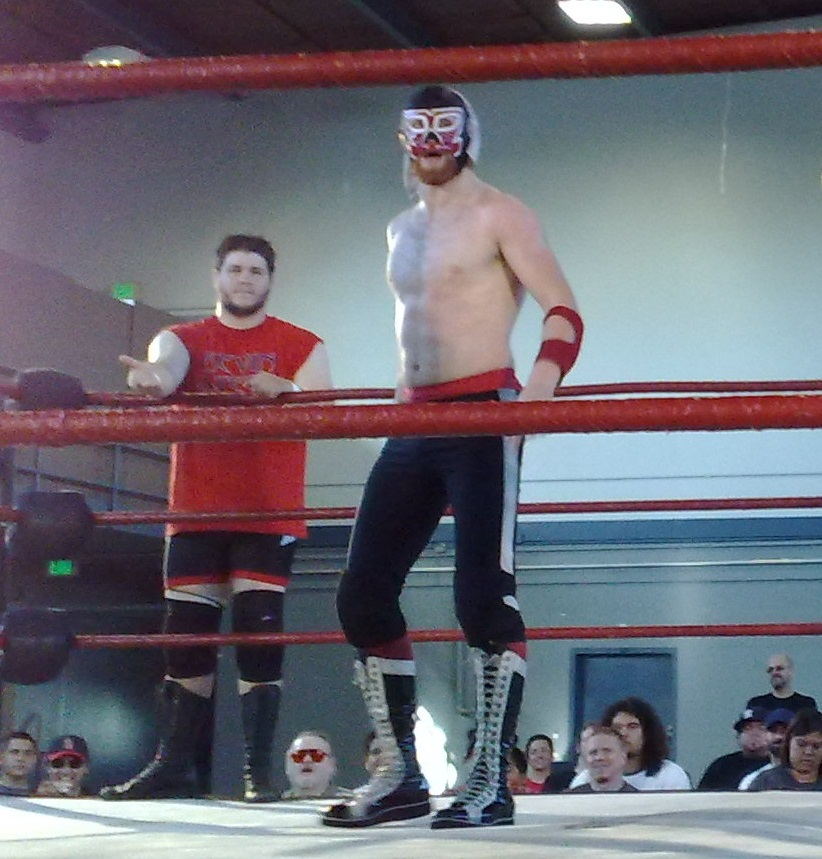
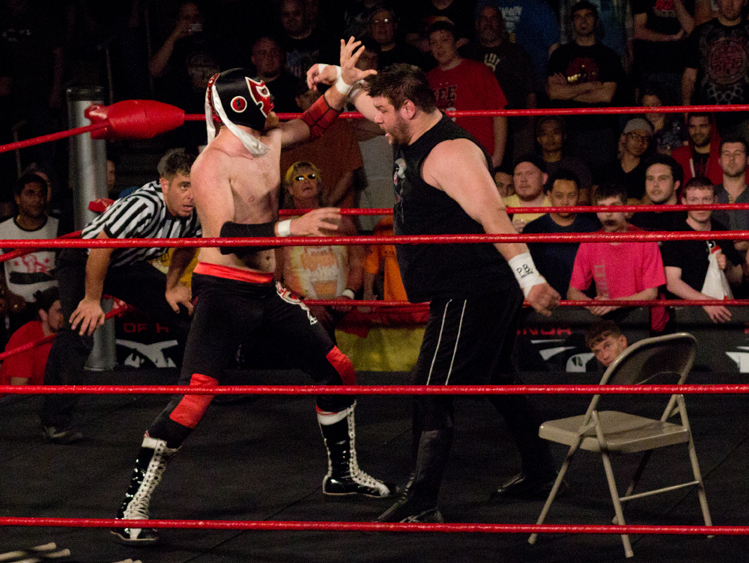
He has teamed up and feuded with Kevin Steen throughout his career.

On December 19, at Final Battle, ROH's first live pay-per-view, after a loss to The Young Bucks, El Generico was attacked by Steen. He then formed a team with Colt Cabana and together the two of them started a feud with Steen and his new partner Steve Corino. At The Big Bang! on April 3, 2010, Generico and Cabana defeated Steen and Corino via disqualification, when Steen used a chair on his former partner. On June 19, at Death Before Dishonor VIII, Generico lost to Steen. On September 11, at Glory By Honor IX, Generico and Cabana defeated Steen and Corino in a Double Chain match, when Cabana forced Corino to tap out. After the match, Steen attacked El Generico and unmasked him. At Final Battle on December 18, El Generico and Steen ended their year-long feud in an unsanctioned Fight Without Honor, where Generico put his mask on the line against Steen's ROH career. Generico won the match and thus forced Steen out of Ring of Honor. On March 2, 2011, ROH announced that El Generico had signed a new contract with the promotion.

On Night 1 of Honor Takes Center Stage on April 1, Generico lost to House of Truth's Michael Elgin after interference from a masked man. The following day, he defeated another House of Truth member, Roderick Strong, but after the match was attacked by Elgin and stable leader Truth Martini. Cabana came out to make the save but was stopped by the House of Truth's advantage in numbers. Christopher Daniels then came out to seemingly help the two, however, he turned on Generico and Cabana, joining the House of Truth and revealing himself as the man who had cost Generico his match against Elgin. On June 26, at Best in the World 2011, Generico defeated Daniels to win the ROH World Television Championship. He lost the title to Jay Lethal on August 13 at the first Ring of Honor Wrestling tapings under the Sinclair Broadcast Group banner.

After a loss to the reinstated Kevin Steen in a Last Man Standing match on March 30, 2012, at Showdown in the Sun, El Generico disappeared from ROH. On October 13, at Glory By Honor XI: The Unbreakable Hope, Steen received a parcel containing Generico's mask. Generico returned to ROH at Final Battle 2012: Doomsday on October 16, unsuccessfully challenging Steen for the ROH World Championship in a ladder war, which marked his last appearance in ROH.

=== Dragon Gate (2007–2009) ===
Generico travelled to Japan during the summer of 2007, where he worked for the Dragon Gate (DG) promotion as the gaijin (foreign) representative of the New Hazard stable. He returned to the promotion in July 2008, where he was announced as Tozawa-juku's "foreign exchange student." El Generico made his third tour of Dragon Gate in October 2009, when he wrestled as a member of the Kamikaze stable.

=== DDT Pro-Wrestling (2011–2012) ===
In early 2011, El Generico began making semi-regular appearances for the Japanese DDT Pro-Wrestling sister-promotion Union Pro Wrestling, making his debut on January 3 with a win over Shinichiro Tominaga. On September 19, El Generico won his first title in Japan, when he defeated Isami Kodaka for the DDT Extreme Championship. After successful title defenses against Shuji Ishikawa and Sanshiro Takagi, he lost the title back to Kodaka on January 3, 2012.

El Generico has also made appearances for Union Pro's parent promotion, DDT Pro-Wrestling, most notably defeating Kota Ibushi in Ibushi's return match from a shoulder injury on May 4, 2012. On August 18, El Generico wrestled his first match in the Nippon Budokan, defeating the debuting Konosuke Takeshita. On September 30, El Generico defeated Ibushi to win the KO-D Openweight Championship, DDT's top title. El Generico made his first successful title defense on October 21 in a rematch against Ibushi. On November 25, El Generico defeated KO-D Tag Team Champion Mikami to retain the title. On December 23, El Generico lost the KO-D Openweight Championship to Kenny Omega.

=== Dragon Gate USA and Evolve (2012) ===
On March 31, 2012, El Generico made his debut for Dragon Gate USA (DGUSA), when he defeated Chuck Taylor, Cima, Lince Dorado, Rich Swann and Samuray del Sol in a six-way match. On April 13, El Generico made his debut for Evolve, a promotion closely affiliated with DGUSA, losing to Low Ki. After another loss to Ricochet on May 11, El Generico achieved his first victory in the promotion on May 12, defeating Sami Callihan. El Generico defeated Samuray del Sol at Evolve 14 on June 28 and lost a rematch the following day at Evolve 15. El Generico returned to Dragon Gate USA on July 28, when he and Samuray were defeated in a tag team match by A. R. Fox and Cima. On September 8, El Generico and Samuray del Sol faced off in another Evolve main event, which Generico won. On November 4, at Dragon Gate USA's Freedom Fight 2012, Generico and Samuray defeated Genki Horiguchi and Ryo Saito. The two continued their winning ways on December 8, at Evolve 18, where they defeated the Super Smash Bros. (Player Uno and Stupefied).

=== WWE ===
==== NXT (2013–2016) ====
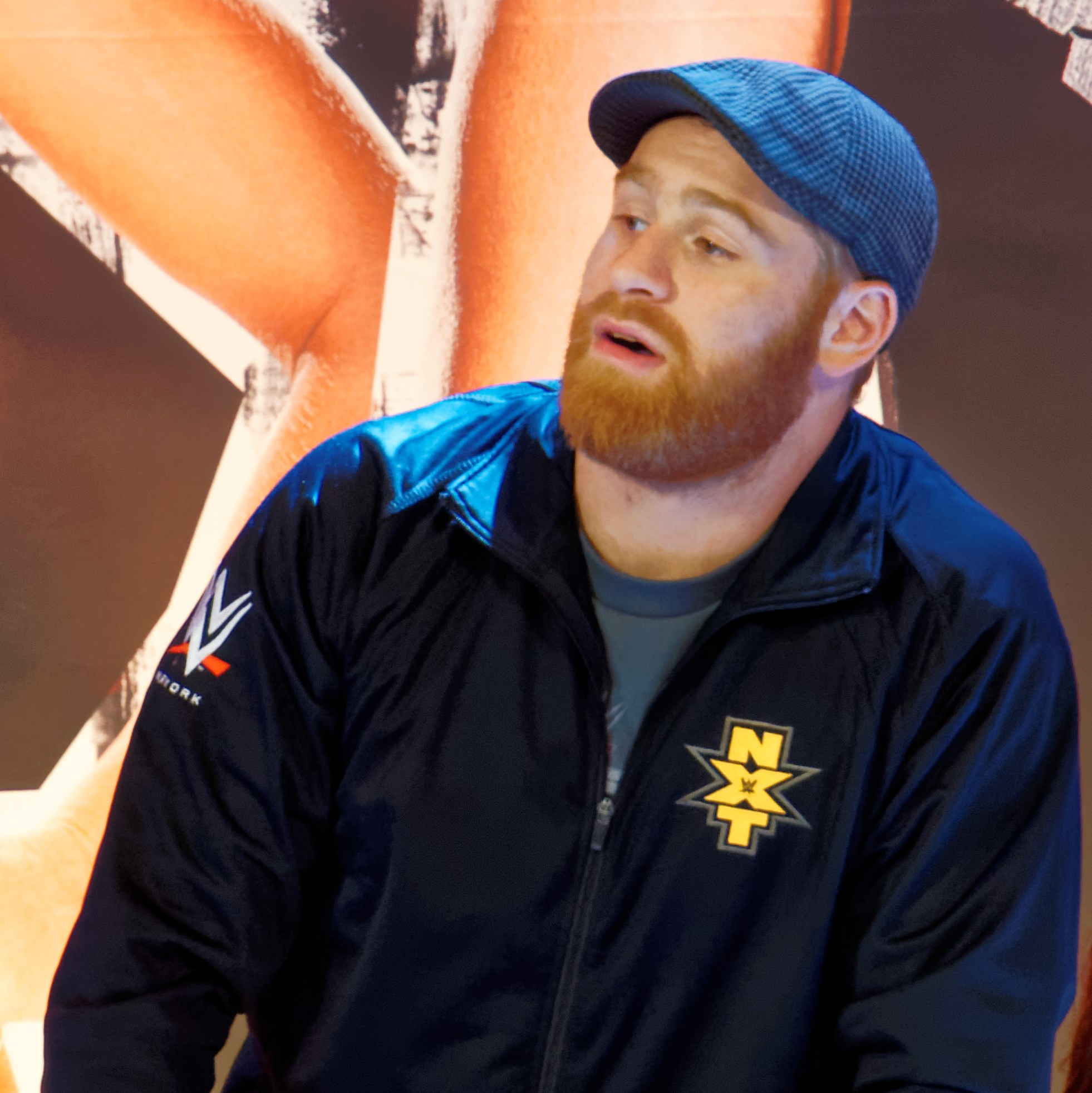
Zayn at WrestleMania Axxess in 2015

In January 2013, Sebei signed with WWE after passing all medical tests. On February 13, Sebei made his debut for WWE's developmental territory NXT, but did not wrestle. Sebei's NXT in-ring debut took place at a live event on March 7 in Tampa, Florida, wrestling a tag team match unmasked under his real name. He eventually settled on the ring name Sami Zayn.

Zayn made his televised debut on the May 22 episode of NXT, first defeating Curt Hawkins in the opening match and then challenging and scoring an upset win over Antonio Cesaro later in the show. The following week, he took part in an 18-man battle royal to determine the number one contender to the NXT Championship, but was eliminated by Mason Ryan. On the June 12 episode of NXT, Zayn suffered his first pinfall loss in NXT in a rematch with Cesaro. On the July 31 episode of NXT, Zayn teamed with NXT Champion Bo Dallas against Cesaro and Leo Kruger; after Cesaro and Zayn brawled to the back, Dallas lost the match and blamed Zayn for the loss. On the August 21 episode of NXT, Zayn lost to Cesaro in a two-out-of-three falls match to conclude the feud. On September 6, Zayn made his WWE debut at a house show in his hometown of Montreal, defeating Cesaro.

When Zayn targeted Dallas' NXT Championship, Dallas cost Zayn his match against Cesaro's fellow Real American Jack Swagger. Dallas held an open challenge to determine the next title contender, but banned Zayn from competing. However, Zayn masqueraded as the masked El Local, defeating Dallas to earn his title shot on the October 16 episode of NXT. NXT General Manager John Bradshaw Layfield restarted the match when Zayn won despite Dallas' foot being on the ropes, after which he sent Zayn into an exposed turnbuckle to retain the title. In November 2013, after tying a Beat the Clock challenge with Adrian Neville by defeating Kruger, Zayn lost a number one contender's match to Neville on the November 27 episode of NXT. On the January 1, 2014, episode of NXT, Zayn defeated Kruger in a two-out-of-three falls match. After this, Zayn's obsession with his loss to Cesaro the previous year led to him challenging Cesaro to a rematch at NXT Arrival on February 27, which he lost, but Cesaro showed respect to Zayn after the match. On the May 8 episode of NXT, Zayn participated in a 20-man battle royal for an NXT Championship shot, with Zayn being involved in a triple threat match tie. As a result, Zayn faced the other two winners, Tyler Breeze and Tyson Kidd in a triple threat match on the next episode of NXT, where Kidd won to become number one contender. At NXT TakeOver on May 29, Zayn lost to Breeze in another number one contender's match.

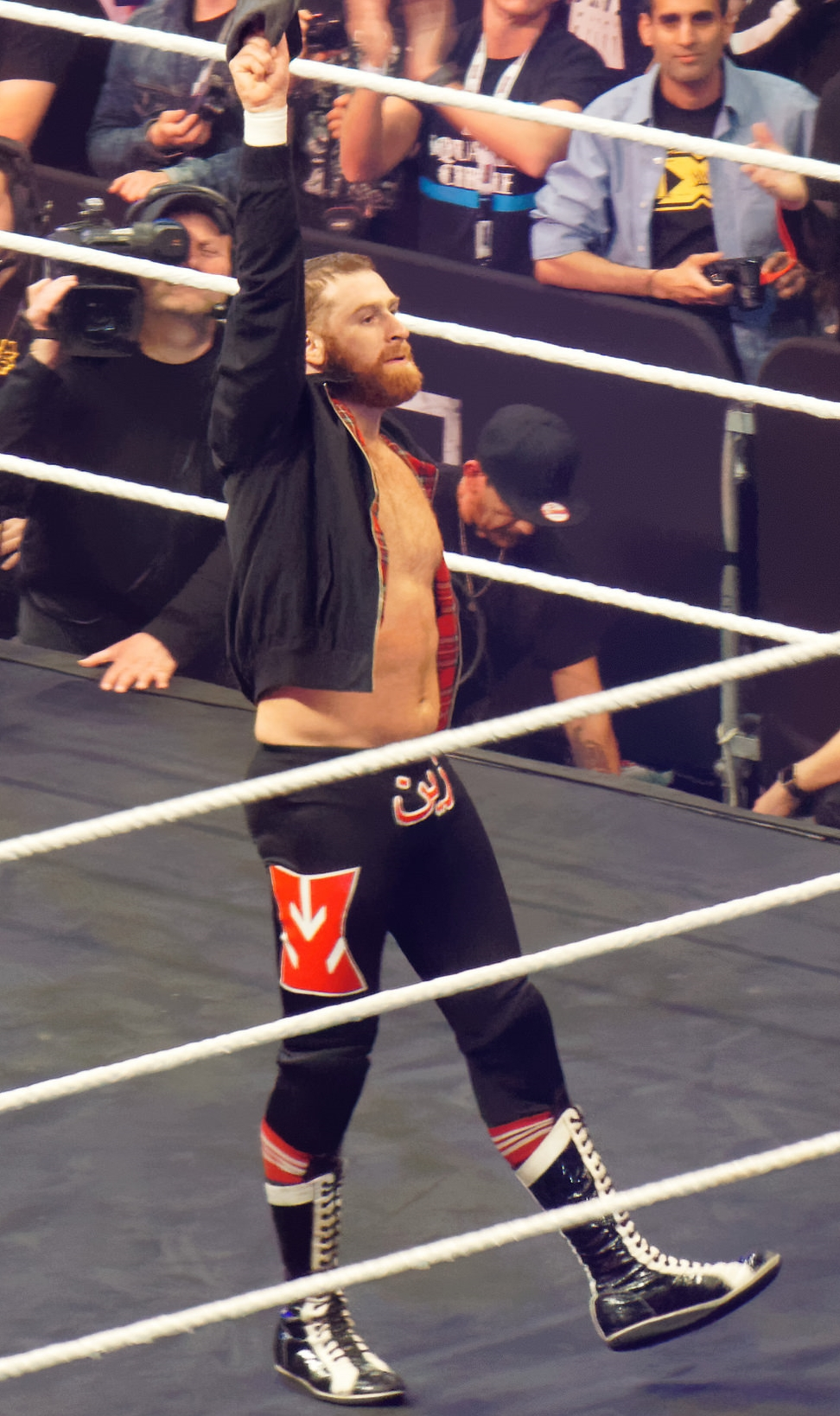
Zayn at NXT TakeOver: Dallas in 2016

In June, Zayn began feuding with Kidd, who abandoned him during a match against NXT Tag Team Champions The Ascension. After Zayn defeated Justin Gabriel, both Kidd and Gabriel attacked Zayn, who was saved by his friend, NXT Champion Adrian Neville. Zayn defeated Kidd on the July 17 episode of NXT and in a first round tournament tag team match for an opportunity at the NXT Tag Team Championship with Adam Rose against Gabriel and Kidd. Zayn and Rose lost in the second round to the Lucha Dragons (Kalisto and Sin Cara). When Zayn, Kidd and Breeze each staked a claim for an NXT Championship match, Neville agreed to face all three in a fatal-four-way match at NXT TakeOver: Fatal 4-Way. Zayn and Neville made their main roster debut on the September 8 episode of Raw, defeating Breeze and Kidd. At NXT TakeOver: Fatal 4-Way on September 11, Zayn failed to win the title after Neville, who retained the title, stopped him by dragging the referee out of the ring. This caused tension within Neville and Zayn's friendship. After Zayn lost another match, this time to Titus O'Neil, he vowed to start a "road to redemption" leading to the NXT Championship and went on a winning streak. Zayn was rewarded with a title match against Neville on the November 13 episode of NXT in which Neville appeared to injure himself during the match, but he took advantage on Zayn checking on him to win the match and retain the title. Neville agreed to Zayn's request for a title rematch, with Zayn vowing to quit NXT if he lost.

At NXT TakeOver: R Evolution on December 11, Zayn defeated Neville to win the NXT Championship, and was congratulated by many other NXT wrestlers afterwards, including Neville and Kevin Owens (the former Kevin Steen). The show ended with Owens powerbombing Zayn onto the ring apron to ruin their reunion. Zayn retained the title against Neville in a rematch on the January 14, 2015, episode of NXT, but suffered another post-match attack by Owens. After an irate Zayn demanded a match against Owens, even if it meant putting the title on the line, a title match was set for NXT TakeOver: Rival on February 11, where Owens captured the title from Zayn via referee stoppage, having powerbombed a disorientated Zayn five times, ending his reign at 62 days.

On the May 4 episode of Raw, Zayn was introduced by Bret Hart as John Cena's opponent for his weekly "U.S. Open Challenge" for his United States Championship, taking place in his hometown of Montreal. Zayn was heavily favored by the crowd over Cena, but lost the match. After the match, Cena let Zayn have the ring to an outstanding ovation from the live crowd. However, Zayn had injured his shoulder before the match and underwent an MRI for further analysis. At NXT TakeOver: Unstoppable on May 20, Zayn's NXT Championship rematch against Owens ended in a no contest when Zayn was unable to continue the match. Owens continued assaulting Zayn until the debuting Samoa Joe made the save. This was used to write Zayn off television as he was set to undergo shoulder surgery. After a seven-month hiatus due to injury, Zayn returned on the December 23 episode of NXT (taped at NXT TakeOver: London on December 16), defeating Tye Dillinger. At NXT TakeOver: Dallas on April 1, Zayn lost to new signee Shinsuke Nakamura.

==== Main roster debut (2016–2017) ====
On January 24, 2016, at Royal Rumble, Zayn entered the titular match at number 20, eliminating Owens before being eliminated by Braun Strowman. On the March 7 episode of Raw, Zayn made a surprise return to the main roster, attacking Owens, who was attempting to attack Neville after their match. This led to a tag team match on SmackDown, where Zayn and Neville defeated Owens and The Miz. At WrestleMania 32 on April 3, Zayn competed against Owens, Dolph Ziggler, The Miz, Stardust, Sin Cara and Zack Ryder in a ladder match for the Intercontinental Championship, which was won by Ryder. The next night on Raw, Zayn was scheduled to compete in a fatal four-way match against Owens, AJ Styles, and Chris Jericho to determine the number one contender for the WWE World Heavyweight Championship, but was attacked by Owens, who attacked him with a powerbomb through a table backstage, and replaced by a returning Cesaro. Shane McMahon gave Zayn another opportunity on the April 11 episode of Raw by having him face Styles, who had won the contender's match the week before, but Zayn lost to Styles. At Payback on May 1, Zayn lost to Owens. At Extreme Rules on May 22, Zayn failed to win the Intercontinental Championship in a fatal four-way match when The Miz pinned Cesaro. At Money in the Bank on June 19, Zayn competed in the Money in the Bank ladder match, which was won by Ambrose. At Battleground on July 24, Zayn defeated Owens.

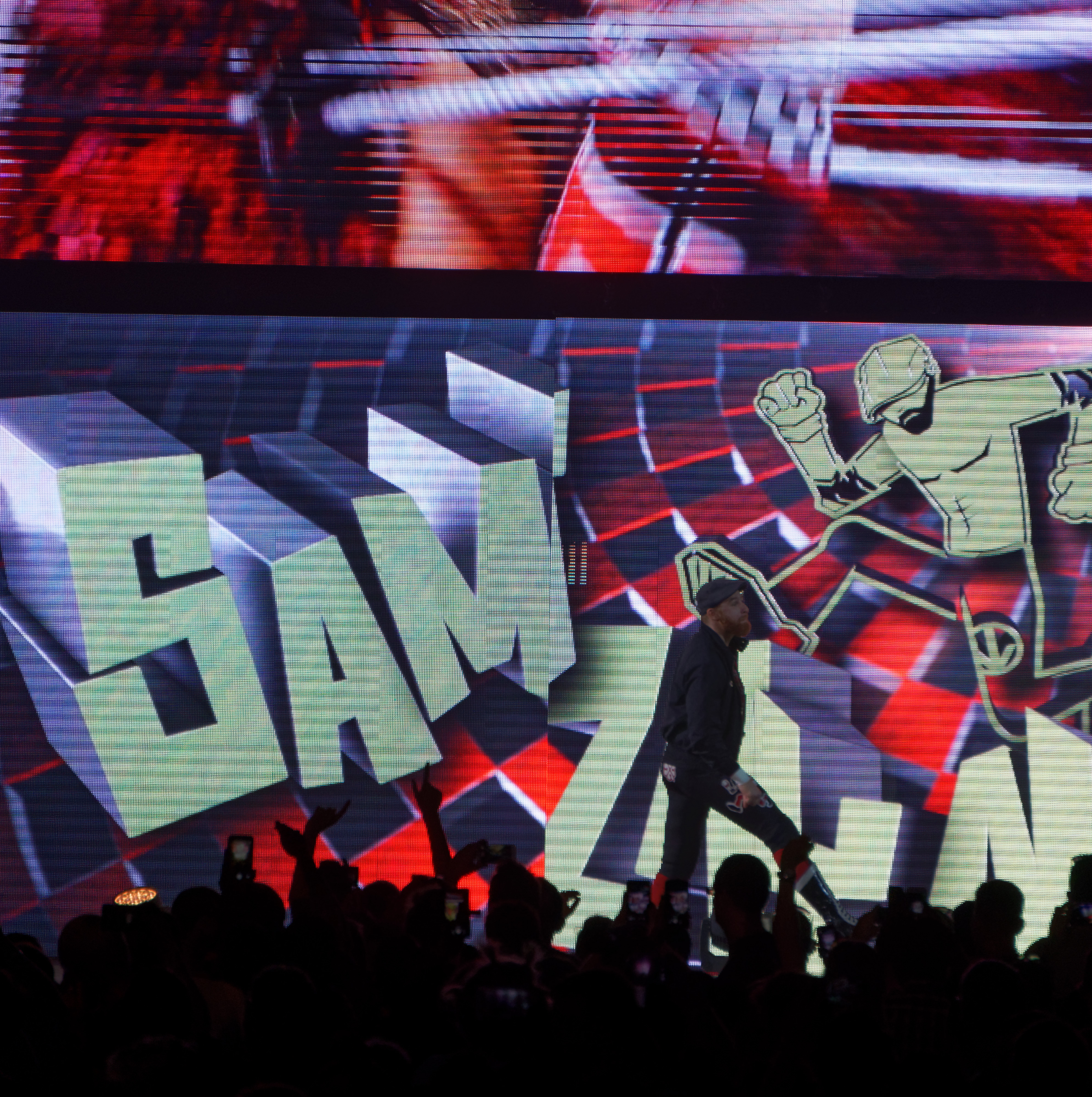
Zayn at a live event in 2016

After losing to Jericho on September 25 at Clash of Champions, Zayn began a feud with Braun Strowman after preventing him from confronting Raw General Manager Mick Foley. On the November 1 episode of SmackDown Live, Intercontinental Champion Dolph Ziggler made an open challenge to any wrestler from the Raw brand. The following week, Zayn stated that Foley wanted him to face Ziggler, but Commissioner Stephanie McMahon, who preferred Rusev, arranged a match with the winner facing Ziggler for the title, which Zayn won. On the November 15 episode of SmackDown Live, The Miz defeated Ziggler for the Intercontinental Championship and Zayn instead faced him at Survivor Series on November 20, but lost. The next night on Raw, Foley ordered Zayn to face Strowman as punishment for failing to bring the title to Raw; Strowman attacked Zayn before the match and attacked him until Foley came out to stop the match. Zayn refused to be traded to SmackDown and a match with Strowman was made for Roadblock: End of the Line on December 18 with a time limit of 10 minutes, which Zayn won. On the January 2, 2017, episode of Raw, Zayn lost to Strowman in a Last Man Standing match, ending their feud.

On the January 23 episode of Raw, Zayn defeated Seth Rollins to win Rollins' opportunity in the Royal Rumble match after Rollins was distracted by Triple H. At the Royal Rumble on January 29, Zayn entered at number 8 and lasted over 47 minutes before being eliminated by The Undertaker. On the February 13 episode of Raw, Zayn responded to comments made by Samoa Joe during a backstage interview, and was attacked by Joe, who defeated Zayn on March 5 at Fastlane. On the March 27 episode of Raw, Zayn defeated Owens in a no disqualification match to save his job.

On April 11, Zayn was traded to SmackDown as part of the Superstar Shake-up. The following week on SmackDown Live, Zayn failed to become the number one contender for WWE Championship after losing a six-pack challenge. After defeating Baron Corbin at Backlash on May 21, Zayn competed in the Money in the Bank ladder match at Money in the Bank on June 18, which was won by Corbin. He lost to Mike Kanellis in the latter's debut match on the July 18 episode of SmackDown, but defeated him in a rematch at Battleground on July 23.

==== Teaming with Kevin Owens (2017–2019) ====
At Hell in a Cell on October 8, Zayn helped Kevin Owens defeat Shane McMahon in a Hell in a Cell match, turning heel for the first time in his career. On the October 10 episode of SmackDown Live, Zayn referred to Owens as his "brother" and explained that his actions were due to McMahon not giving Zayn opportunities despite SmackDown being dubbed the "Land of Opportunity". At Clash of Champions on December 17, Owens and Zayn defeated Randy Orton and Shinsuke Nakamura in a tag team match with SmackDown Commissioner Shane McMahon and SmackDown General Manager Daniel Bryan as special guest referees and their jobs on the line. Owens and Zayn failed to win Styles's WWE Championship in a handicap match at Royal Rumble on January 28, 2018 and at Fastlane on March 11 in a six-pack challenge.

On the March 20 episode of SmackDown, Zayn and Owens were (kayfabe) fired by Bryan as punishment for an attack against McMahon the week prior. At WrestleMania 34 on April 8, Owens and Zayn lost to Bryan and McMahon, after Bryan submitted Zayn. On the April 16 episode of Raw, Zayn and Owens were awarded Raw contracts by Raw Commissioner Stephanie McMahon. At Backlash on May 6, Zayn and Owens lost to Bobby Lashley and Braun Strowman. At Money in the Bank on June 17, Zayn lost to Lashley. Following the event, it was reported that Zayn had surgery to repair both of his rotator cuffs. He was later reported to have undergone a successful double shoulder surgery.

Zayn returned from injury on the April 8, 2019, episode of Raw, losing to Intercontinental Champion Finn Bálor. The following week, Zayn defeated Strowman with the help of Baron Corbin and Drew McIntyre, earning Strowman's spot in the Money in the Bank ladder match. At Money in the Bank on May 19, Zayn was attacked backstage and left unable to compete by who was believed to be Strowman, however it was later revealed to be Brock Lesnar, who took Zayn's place in the match. Zayn and Owens defeated The New Day (Big E and Xavier Woods) at Stomping Grounds on June 23, after which their team again drifted apart after Owens turned face and reignited his feud with Shane McMahon. In August, Zayn lost to Cedric Alexander in the first round of the King of the Ring tournament.

==== Intercontinental Champion (2019–2022) ====
Shortly after, Zayn joined forces with Intercontinental Champion Shinsuke Nakamura, being positioned as Nakamura's mouthpiece. As part of the 2019 draft, Zayn was drafted to the SmackDown brand, where he also became the manager of Cesaro. At Elimination Chamber on March 8, Zayn, Nakamura, and Cesaro defeated Strowman in a 3-on-1 handicap match to win the Intercontinental Championship; Zayn won the title by pinning Strowman. On Night 1 of WrestleMania 36 on April 4, Zayn defeated Daniel Bryan to retain the title. On May 12, he was stripped of the championship after refraining from competing during the COVID-19 pandemic, ending his reign at 65 days. Zayn returned on the August 28 episode of SmackDown, attacking Intercontinental Champion Jeff Hardy and declaring himself the "real" Intercontinental Champion. At Clash of Champions on September 27, Zayn defeated Hardy and AJ Styles in a triple threat ladder match to regain the Intercontinental Championship by handcuffing both with the ladders. On the October 2 episode of SmackDown, Zayn defeated Hardy to retain the title. At Survivor Series on November 22, Zayn lost to United States Champion Bobby Lashley in a champion vs. champion match. On the December 25 episode of SmackDown, he lost the Intercontinental Championship to Big E, ending his second reign at 89 days.

On January 31, 2021, at Royal Rumble, Zayn entered at number 3, but was eliminated by Big E. At Elimination Chamber on February 21, Zayn competed in the Elimination Chamber match where the winner would receive an immediate Universal Championship match, but was the second man eliminated by Kevin Owens. Zayn lost to Owens at Night 2 of WrestleMania 37 on April 11, defeated Owens at Hell in a Cell on June 20, and lost to Owens again in a Last Man Standing Money in the Bank qualifying match on the July 2 episode of SmackDown.

In October, Zayn entered the King of the Ring tournament, defeating Rey Mysterio in the first round but lost to Finn Bálor in the semi-finals. On November 6, Zayn was announced as a part of Team SmackDown at Survivor Series, however, on the November 12 episode of SmackDown, Zayn faced Hardy in a match with the stipulation that whoever lost was removed from the SmackDown Survivor Series team, which Zayn lost, thus removing him. On the November 26 episode of SmackDown, Zayn won a battle royal to become the number one contender for the Universal Championship by last eliminating Hardy. Zayn received his title match against Roman Reigns on the December 3 episode of SmackDown, but lost in 15 seconds due to Brock Lesnar attacking him before the match.

On the January 7, 2022, episode of SmackDown, Zayn entered a feud with Johnny Knoxville, who announced his entry in the Royal Rumble match. At the titular event on January 29, Zayn entered at number 8 and eliminated Knoxville before being eliminated by Styles. On the February 18 (taped February 11) episode of SmackDown, Zayn defeated Shinsuke Nakamura to win his third Intercontinental Championship. He lost the title to Ricochet on the March 4 episode of SmackDown after interference from Knoxville, ending his reign at 21 days (recognized by WWE as 13 days). The following week, Zayn failed to regain the Intercontinental Championship from Ricochet. On Night 2 of WrestleMania 38 on April 3, Zayn lost to Knoxville in an Anything Goes match after interference from the latter's Jackass co-actors.

==== The Bloodline and reunion with Kevin Owens (2022–2024) ====
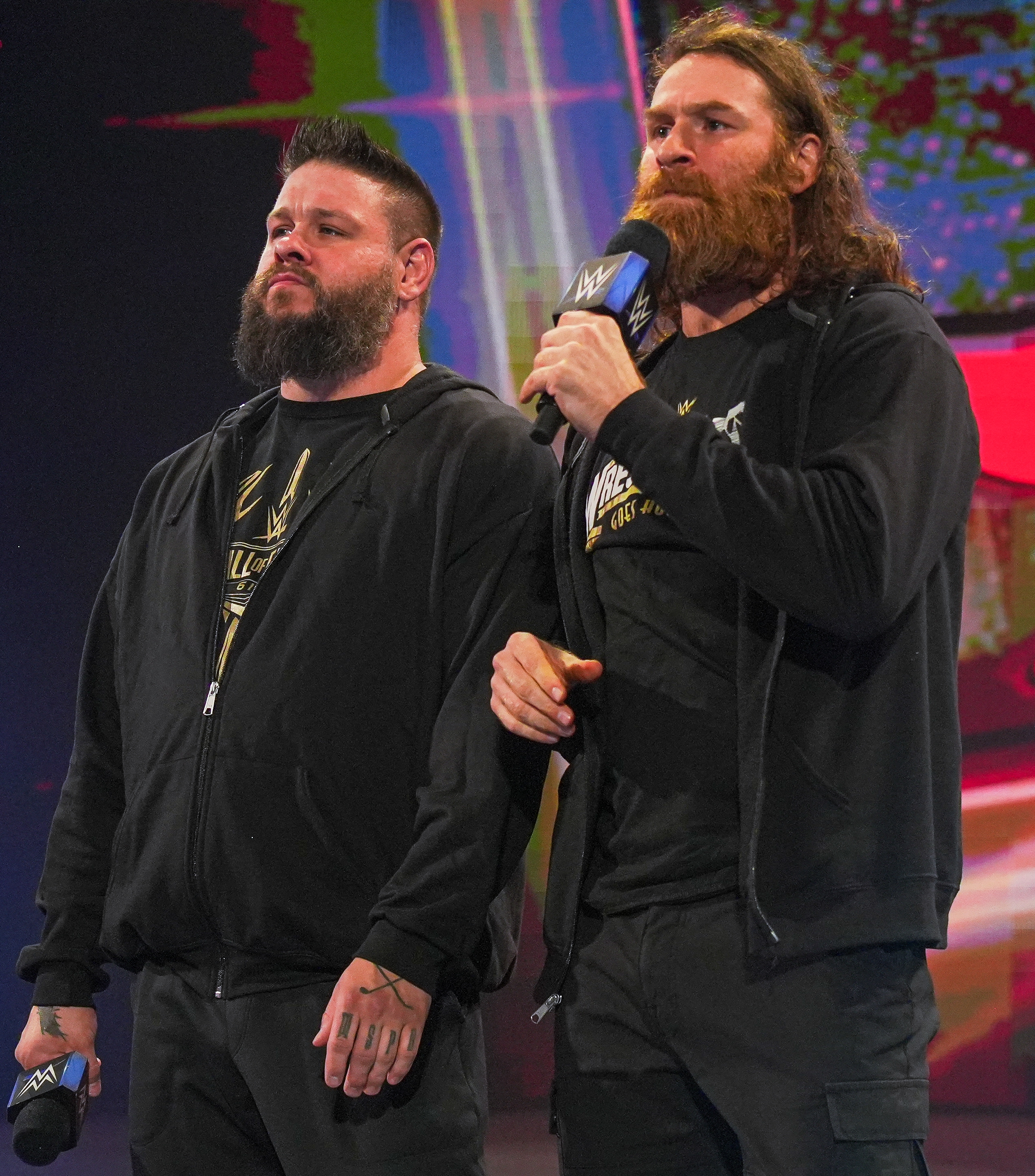
After being associated with The Bloodline, Zayn reunited with Kevin Owens in 2023.

Following WrestleMania, having felt as he had lost respect and credibility in the locker room, Zayn sought to seek favor with The Bloodline, a stable led by Reigns. On the May 27 episode of SmackDown, he was deemed an "Honorary Uce" and became an associate of the group. At Money in the Bank on July 2, Zayn competed in the Money in the Bank ladder match, which was won by Theory. On the September 23 episode of SmackDown, Reigns declared Zayn an official "Honorary Uce". Tensions also rose between Zayn and Bloodline member Jey Uso, who did not trust Zayn and constantly argued with him. At Survivor Series: WarGames on November 26, Zayn, along with The Bloodline, defeated The Brawling Brutes (Sheamus, Butch, and Ridge Holland), Kevin Owens and Drew McIntyre in a WarGames match. After the match, due to Zayn showing his loyalty to the stable by delivering a low blow to Owens, Jey accepted Zayn as part of The Bloodline. In January 2023, Zayn was placed in Tribal Court at Raw is XXX, but he would be found "not guilty, for now" in regard to betraying The Bloodline.

At Royal Rumble on January 28, after Reigns retained the Undisputed WWE Universal Championship against Owens, he had the rest of The Bloodline beat Owens down, but Zayn refused to join the beatdown and eventually hit Reigns with a chair, leading to the entire Bloodline (excluding Jey) attacking Zayn, turning face for the first time since 2017. On February 18, at Elimination Chamber, Zayn faced Reigns for the Undisputed WWE Universal Championship in front of his home crowd in Montreal, but failed to win the titles. After the match, Owens saved Zayn from a beatdown by Reigns and Jimmy. Jey remained unbiased until the March 6 episode of Raw, where he hit Zayn with a superkick to end their alliance.

On Night 1 of WrestleMania 39 on April 1, Zayn and Owens defeated The Usos to win the Undisputed WWE Tag Team Championship (consisting of both the Raw and SmackDown Tag Team Championships) in the main event. They successfully defended the titles in a rematch on the April 28 episode of SmackDown. As part of the 2023 WWE Draft, Zayn, along with Owens, was drafted to the Raw brand. On May 27, at Night of Champions, Zayn and Owens retained their Undisputed Tag Team Championship against Reigns and Solo Sikoa. At Payback on September 2, Owens and Zayn lost the titles to The Judgment Day's Damian Priest and Finn Bálor in a Pittsburgh Steel City Street Fight, ending their reign at 154 days. They were unsuccessful in a rematch for the titles on the September 25 episode of Raw. In October, Owens was traded to the SmackDown brand, splitting up the team of Zayn and Owens. After his split from Owens, Zayn continued feuding with The Judgment Day, winning a WarGames match against them at Survivor Series: WarGames.

==== United States Champion (2024–2026) ====
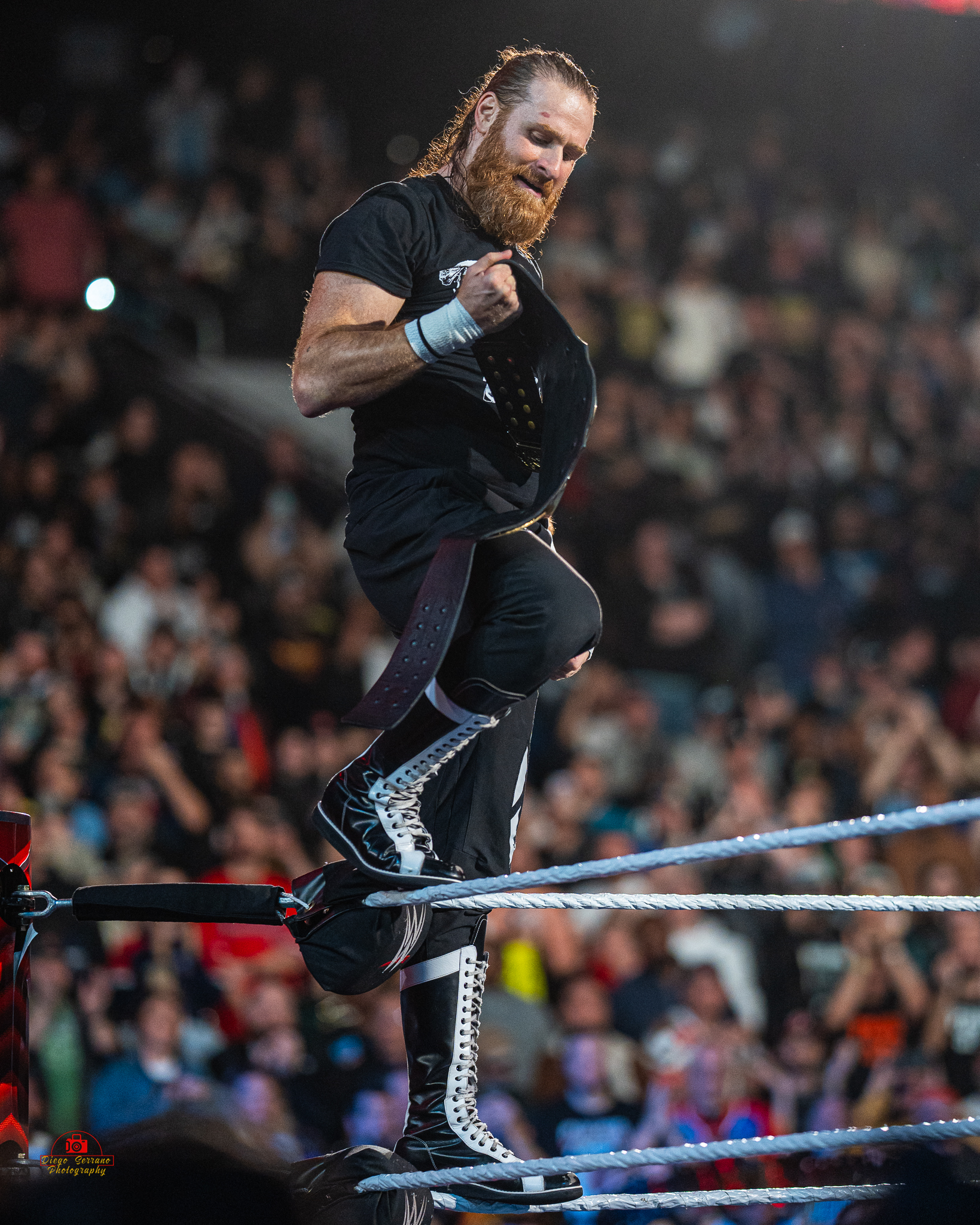
Zayn as the Intercontinental Champion in 2024

On Night 1 of WrestleMania XL, Zayn defeated Gunther to win the WWE Intercontinental Championship for the fourth time, ending Gunther's record-setting title reign at 666 days. Zayn retained the title during 119 days, defeating Chad Gable and Bronson Reed at King and Queen of the Ring and Gable at Clash at the Castle: Scotland. At Money in the Bank on July 6, Zayn successfully defended the title against Bron Breakker, but lost it to him at SummerSlam. He failed to regain the title from Breakker in a two out of three falls match on the August 12 episode of Raw, ending their feud.

Zayn faced Gunther for the World Heavyweight Championship on the October 7 episode of Raw, but lost by technical submission after passing out to the rear-naked choke. Then, Zayn was involved in a feud between Roman Reigns and The Usos and the new iteration of The Bloodline, consisting of Sikoa, Tama Tonga, Tonga Loa and Jacob Fatu, wrestling them at Survivor Series: WarGames in a WarGames match where Zayn's team was victorious. In 2025, Zayn restarted his feud with Kevin Owens losing against him at Elimination Chamber: Toronto in a unsanctioned match. Since January, Zayn also started a storyline with Karrion Kross, who had been playing mind games with Zayn, believing that Zayn was a liar and not the good guy he portrayed himself to be, thus starting a feud between Zayn and Kross. This led to them wrestling at Night of Champions and SummerSlam, with Zayn winning both matches.

After SummerSlam, Zayn was transferred to the SmackDown brand, where he won the WWE United States Championship by defeating Solo Sikoa on the August 29 episode of SmackDown. Zayn would implement the "United States Championship Open Challenge", successfully retaining the title weekly against the likes of John Cena, Rey Fénix, Carmelo Hayes, Je'Von Evans, Aleister Black, and Shinsuke Nakamura, before losing the title to Ilja Dragunov on the October 17 edition of SmackDown, ending his reign at 49 days. Heading into 2026, Zayn set his sights on capturing his first world championship in WWE. At Saturday Night's Main Event XLIII, Zayn defeated Damian Priest, Randy Orton and Trick Williams to earn an Undisputed WWE Championship match at the Royal Rumble on January 31, where he failed to win the title from Drew McIntyre. Zayn won his second United States championship when he defeated Carmelo Hayes in an open challenge on the March 27 episode of SmackDown, but lost it to Trick Williams 23 days later at WrestleMania 42, and failed to regain the title from Williams at Backlash.

==== Undisputed WWE Champion (2026–present) ====
Following WrestleMania 42, as the negative reactions from the crowd escalated, Zayn slowly transitioned into a tweener and referred to those who remained loyal to him as "Ride or Die fans", and declared himself the "Last Real Good Guy". Zayn entered a storyline with Gunther and the Undisputed WWE Champion Cody Rhodes, costing Gunther the title twice, this culminated to a triple threat match at Night of Champions. At the event on June 27, Zayn defeated Rhodes and Gunther to win the Undisputed WWE Championship, his first world title in WWE, thus also making him the 36th Triple Crown and overall 26th Grand Slam champion (19th under the current format) as well as the second Muslim to hold the title (after The Iron Sheik in 1983). His reign only lasted nine days as he lost the title in his first defense to a returning CM Punk on the July 6 episode of Raw.

On Night 2 of SummerSlam on August 2, Zayn lost to a returning Kevin Owens in a fatal four-way match also involving Finn Bálor and Gunther, to determine the #1 contender for the Undisputed WWE Championship. After spending four months as a tweener, Zayn turned heel on the August 21 episode of SmackDown for the first time since 2023 when he cost Owens his Undisputed WWE Championship match against Punk. On the September 11 episode of SmackDown, Zayn defeated Punk in a rematch to win the Undisputed WWE Championship for a second time, after interferences from Owens and his allies Johnny Gargano and Candice LeRae. After regaining the championship, Zayn retained his title several times, such as against Owens on the following week's episode of SmackDown, Je'Von Evans on the October 26 episode of Raw, and Trick Williams on the October 30 episode of SmackDown. At Crown Jewel on November 7, Zayn lost to World Heavyweight Champion Roman Reigns in a Champion vs Champion match for the Crown Jewel Championship.

== Other media ==
Sebei, as Sami Zayn, made his video game debut as a playable character in WWE 2K15 and has since appeared in WWE 2K16, WWE 2K17, WWE 2K18, WWE 2K19, WWE 2K20, WWE 2K Battlegrounds, WWE 2K22, WWE 2K23, WWE 2K24, WWE 2K25 (where he also stars as a cover athlete on the "Bloodline Edition"), and WWE 2K26.

In 2024, he hosted Sami Zayn and Friends, a live variety show featuring fellow wrestlers and celebrities as guests.

== Personal life ==
Sebei is known for being quiet about his private life. He is a Muslim and performed Umrah while in Saudi Arabia for WWE's 2023 Night of Champions event. Sebei has expressed vocal support of Palestine in the Israeli–Palestinian conflict, particularly over the course of the Gaza War. In July 2017, Sebei set up a fund called "Sami for Syria" to support the Syrian American Medical Society, which had raised over $105,000 by July 2018.

Sebei is married to a woman named Khadija and they have a son. He is a vegan, and is fluent in English, Arabic, and French. Sebei is close friends with fellow professional wrestler Kevin Steen, better known in WWE as Kevin Owens, with whom he has teamed up and feuded with throughout his career.

In October 2026, it was announced that Sebei had become an American citizen.

== Championships and accomplishments ==
Sebei, as Sami Zayn, is the current and two-time Undisputed WWE Champion.

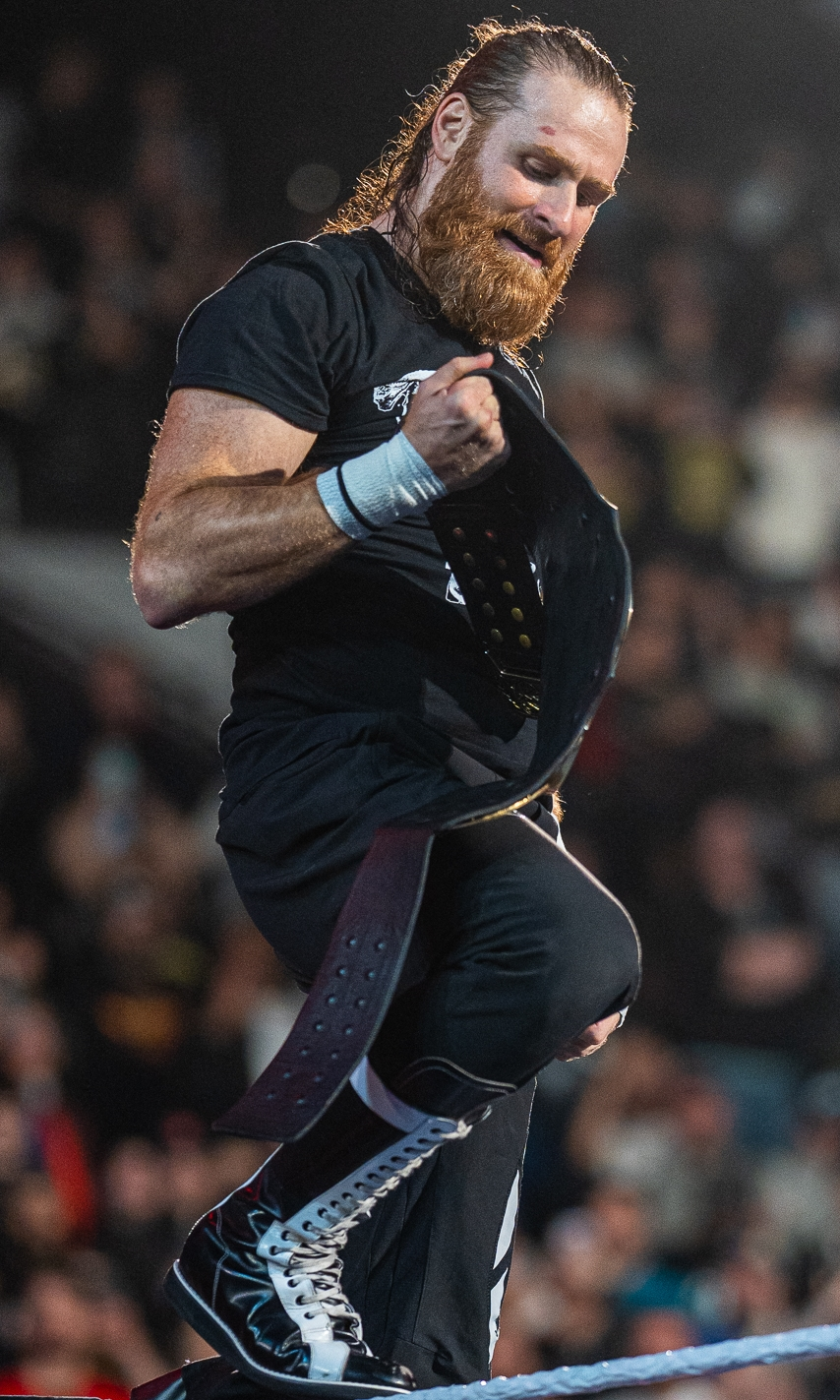
Zayn is a four-time WWE Intercontinental Champion.

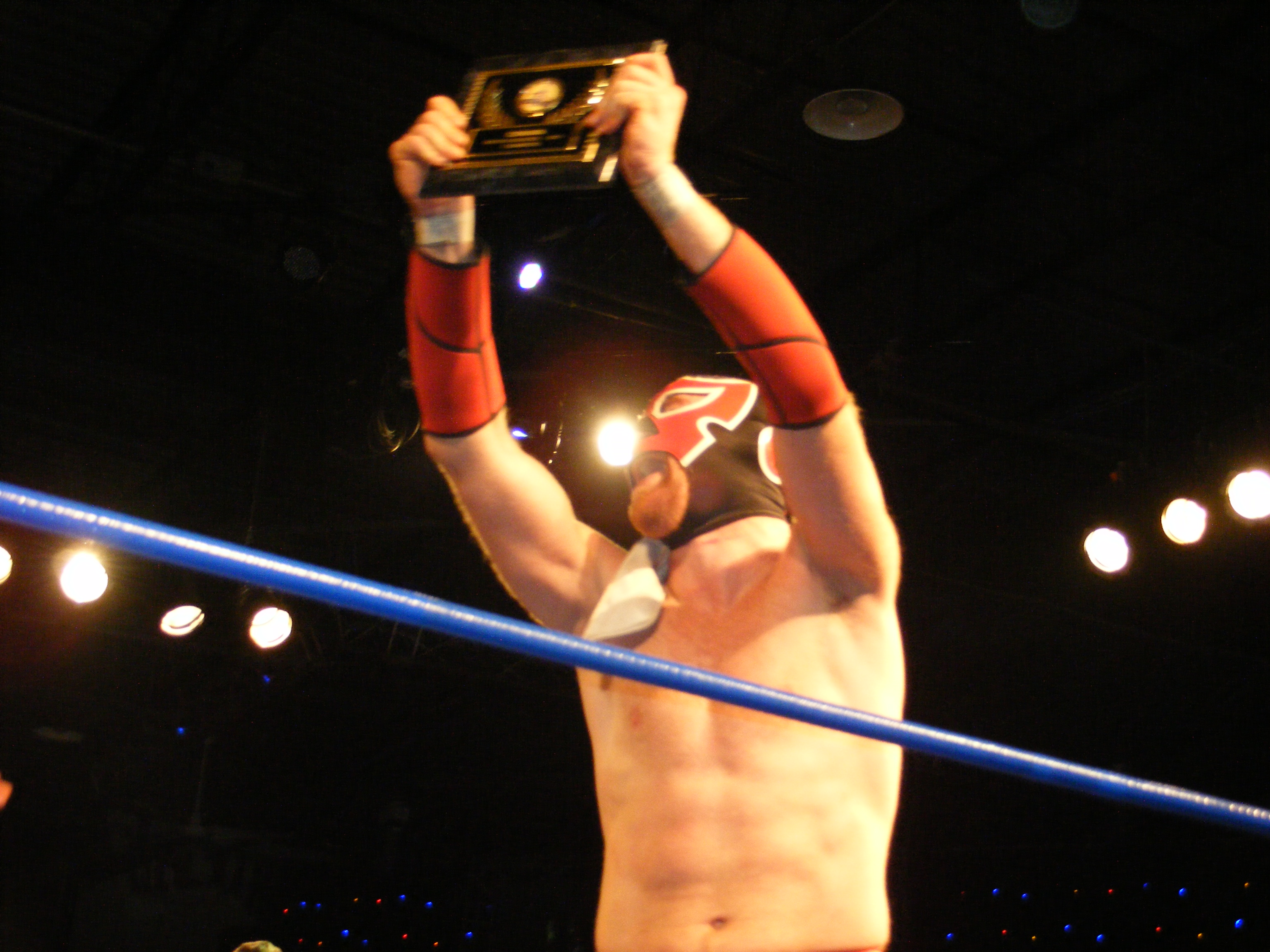
Sebei, as El Generico, is the winner of the 2011 Rey de Voladores.

- Association de Lutte Féminine
  - Sensational Sherri Memorial Cup Tournament (2007) – with LuFisto
- The Baltimore Sun
  - WWE Match of the Year (2016) vs. Shinsuke Nakamura at NXT TakeOver: Dallas
- Britannia Wrestling Promotions
  - PWI:BWP World Catchweight Championship (1 time)
- Chikara
  - Rey de Voladores (2011)
- DDT Pro-Wrestling / Union Pro Wrestling
  - DDT Extreme Championship (1 time)
  - KO-D Openweight Championship (1 time)
  - Best Foreigner Award (2012)
- Elite Wrestling Revolution
  - Elite 8 Tournament (2004)
- ESPN
  - Best storyline of the year (2022) – part of The Bloodline
- International Wrestling Syndicate
  - IWS World Heavyweight Championship (2 times)
  - IWS World Tag Team Championship (1 time) – with Twiggy
- Monteregie Wrestling Federation
  - MWF Provincial Championship (2 times)
- New York Post
  - Storyline of the Year (2022) part of The Bloodline
- North Shore Pro Wrestling
  - NSPW Championship (1 time)
- Pro Wrestling Guerrilla
  - PWG World Championship (2 times)
  - PWG World Tag Team Championship (5 times) – with Human Tornado (1), Quicksilver (1), Kevin Steen (2), and Paul London (1)
  - Battle of Los Angeles (2011)
  - Dynamite Duumvirate Tag Team Title Tournament (2010) – with Paul London
- Pro Wrestling Illustrated
  - Faction of the Year (2022) – The Bloodline
  - Feud of the Year (2023) vs. The Bloodline
  - Ranked No. 12 of the top 500 singles wrestlers in the PWI 500 in 2024
- Puerto Rico Wrestling Association
  - PRWA Caribbean Championship (1 time)
- Ring of Honor
  - ROH World Television Championship (1 time)
  - ROH World Tag Team Championship (1 time) – with Kevin Steen
  - Match of the Decade (2010s) vs. Kevin Steen at Final Battle 2012: Doomsday
- SoCal Uncensored
  - Match of the Year (2006) vs. PAC, November 18, Pro Wrestling Guerrilla
  - Match of the Year (2007) vs. Bryan Danielson, July 29, Pro Wrestling Guerrilla
  - Most Outstanding Wrestler (2006, 2007)
  - Tag Team of the Year (2006) with Quicksilver
  - Wrestler of the Year (2007)
- STHLM Wrestling
  - STHLM Wrestling Championship (1 time)
- Westside Xtreme Wrestling
  - wXw Unified World Wrestling Championship (1 time)
  - 16 Carat Gold Tournament (2012)
- Wrestling Observer Newsletter
  - Feud of the Year (2010) vs. Kevin Steen
  - Feud of the Year (2023) with Kevin Owens vs. The Bloodline
  - Shad Gaspard/Jon Huber Memorial Award (2020)
  - Best Gimmick (2022)
- WWE
  - Undisputed WWE Championship (2 times, current)
  - NXT Championship (1 time)
  - WWE Intercontinental Championship (4 times)
  - WWE United States Championship (2 times)
  - WWE Raw Tag Team Championship (1 time) – with Kevin Owens
  - WWE SmackDown Tag Team Championship (1 time) – with Kevin Owens
  - WWE Championship #1 Contender's Tournament (2026)
  - 36th Triple Crown Champion
  - 19th Grand Slam Champion (under current format; 26th overall)
  - Slammy Award (2 times)
    - NXT Superstar of the Year (2014)
    - Faction of the Year (2025) with Roman Reigns, Jey Uso, and Jimmy Uso as The OG Bloodline
  - Bumpy Award (1 time)
    - Social Moment of the Half-Year (2021)

== Luchas de Apuestas record ==
Winner (wager)	Loser (wager)	Location	Event	Date	Notes
El Generico (mask)	Kevin Steen (contract)	New York City, New York	Final Battle	December 18, 2010	This was an Unsanctioned Fight Without Honor
Sami Zayn (career)	Adrian Neville (title)	Winter Park, Florida	NXT TakeOver: R Evolution	December 11, 2014	
