= Back to Me =

Back to Me may refer to:

- Back to Me (Cueshé album), 2006
- Back to Me (Fantasia album), 2010
- Back to Me (Howie Dorough album), 2011
- Back to Me (Kathleen Edwards album), 2005
- "Back to Me" (¥$ song), 2024
- "Back to Me" (Lindsay Lohan song), 2020
- "Back to Me" (Marian Hill and Lauren Jauregui song), 2016
- "Back to Me" (The Marías song), 2025
- "Back to Me", a song by the All-American Rejects from When the World Comes Down, 2008
- "Back to Me", a song by Daya from Daya, 2015
- "Back2Me", a song by Eraserheads from Cutterpillow, 1995
- "Back to Me", a song by XO-IQ, featured in the television series Make It Pop
