= Pogi rock =

Slang term for Filipino rock bands considered good-looking or stylish

A Pogi rock (transl. Handsome rock) is a slang term and style for alternative rock bands in the Philippines from the early 2000s that became popular for their love songs, heartbreak anthems, and attractive image. The term was originally a joke but came to be associated with bands such as Hale, Callalily, and Cueshé, who were regularly played on the radio and featured on MYX. While these bands were sometimes seen as more gentle than typical rock acts, they are recognized for shaping the romantic sound of OPM during that era.

== Overview ==
Rock music that grew in popularity during the 1990s helped set the stage for Filipino bands to gain attention on FM radio and television in the early 2000s. Bands such as Hale, Cueshé, Callalily, 6cyclemind, and Sponge Cola became known for love songs that focused on relationship experiences. Their wholesome image and easygoing style attracted many teenage fans. They were often associated with a boy-next-door image and romantic themes.

== Reception ==
Some critics of the term "Pogi rock" first thought certain bands were too attractive to be regarded seriously in the music industry. However, their musical ability and confident demeanor helped them transcend this preconception. They later marked their success with separate concerts, celebrating both long-time fans and new supporters. Reflecting on the label, Sponge Cola frontman Yael Yuzon said, "People just needed to coin something and that’s alright. At least, we were called pogi rock, not pangit rock." "Pogi rock" wasn't a common term back then, the mix of "romantic" lyrics and "clean-cut" looks came to define bands like Callalily. The Varsitarian publication described the style as more image-driven than raw rock, noting that "pogi rock" refers to bands known more for their looks than their music.

== See also ==
- Pinoy rock
- College rock
