= Driven (2007) =

Professional wrestling event

- Promotional poster featuring Bryan Danielson, Nigel McGuinness, and Takeshi Morishima
- Promotion: Ring of Honor
- Date: June 23, 2007 (aired September 21, 2007)
- City: Chicago Ridge, Illinois
- Venue: Frontier Fieldhouse
- Attendance: 2,700

Pay-per-view chronology
← Previous; Respect is Earned	Next → Man Up

Driven chronology
← Previous; First	Next → 2008

Driven (2007) was the inaugural Driven professional wrestling pay-per-view (PPV) event promoted by Ring of Honor (ROH). It took place on June 23, 2007 at the Frontier Fieldhouse in Chicago Ridge, Illinois, and first aired on September 21.

== Production ==
=== Storylines ===
Other on-screen personnel
Role	Name
Commentators	Dave Prazak
Commentators	Lenny Leonard

Driven featured storylines and professional wrestling matches that involved different wrestlers from pre-existing scripted feuds and storylines. Storylines were produced on ROH's weekly television programme Ring of Honor Wrestling.

== Results ==
No.	Results	Stipulations	Times
1^{D}	Alex Payne and Ernie Osiris defeated Mitch Franklin and Dingo	Tag team match	—
2	No Remorse Corps (Roderick Strong, Davey Richards and Rocky Romero) defeated Delirious and The Resilience (Matt Cross and Erick Stevens)	Six-man tag team match	11:23
3	Claudio Castagnoli defeated Matt Sydal	Singles match	08:18
4	Naomichi Marufuji defeated B. J. Whitmer	Singles match	10:56
5	Brent Albright defeated Pelle Primeau by submission	Singles match	01:41
6	Takeshi Morishima (c) defeated Jimmy Rave	Singles match for the ROH World Championship	03:56
7	The Briscoe Brothers (Jay Briscoe and Mark Briscoe) (c) defeated Kevin Steen and El Generico	Tag team match for the ROH World Tag Team Championship	16:06
8	The Minnesota Home Wrecking Crew (Lacey and Rain) (with Jimmy Jacobs) defeated Daizee Haze and MsChif	Women of Honor Tag team match	8:41
9	Nigel McGuinness defeated Chris Hero (with Larry Sweeney, Tank Toland and Bobby Dempsey)	Singles match	18:23
10	Takeshi Morishima (c) defeated Adam Pearce (with Shane Hagadorn)	Singles match for the ROH World Championship	5:25
11^{D}	Bryan Danielson defeated Nigel McGuinness (Note: This match was taped two weeks prior on September 9th but was shown on PPV and marketed as the main event.)	Singles match	25:33
(c) / – the champion(s) heading into the match; D / – this was a dark match

== See also ==
- 2007 in professional wrestling
- List of Ring of Honor pay-per-view events
