= Life (Cueshé album) =

Studio album by Cueshé
- Released: September 1, 2010 (Philippines)
- Genre: OPM, pop rock
- Length: 49:18
- Label: Musiko Records & Sony Music Philippines, Inc.

Cueshé chronology
Driven (2008)	Life (2010)

Singles from Life
- 1. "Pangako" Released: September 2, 2010; 2. "Lupit" Released: July 24, 2011; 3. "Still" Released: December 4, 2011; 4. "Fade" Released: September 14, 2012; 5. "Sana" Released: April 13, 2013

Life is Cueshe's fourth and current album released on September 1, 2010 by Musiko Records & Sony Music Philippines, Inc.

== Track listing ==
No.	Title	Length
1.	"Pangako"	3:34
2.	"Tara Na"	5:01
3.	"Damage"	4:15
4.	"Lupit"	4:29
5.	"Still"	3:48
6.	"Sana"	3:57
7.	"Alone"	4:10
8.	"Fade"	4:26
9.	"Sweet Surrender"	3:49
10.	"Breathe"	3:45
11.	"Over Now"	3:29
12.	"Now"	4:35
