= Respect is Earned (2007) =

2007 professional wrestling pay-per-view

- Promotion: Ring of Honor
- Date: May 12, 2007 (aired July 1, 2007)
- City: New York, New York
- Venue: Manhattan Center
- Attendance: 1,250

Pay-per-view chronology
← Previous; First	Next → Driven

Respect Is Earned chronology
← Previous; First	Next → II

Respect is Earned (2007) was a professional wrestling pay-per-view (PPV) event promoted by Ring of Honor. It was the promotion's first PPV. It took place on May 12, 2007 from the Manhattan Center in New York, New York, and first aired on PPV on July 1.

== Storylines ==
Other on-screen personnel
Role	Name
Commentators	Dave Prazak
Commentators	Lenny Leonard

Respect is Earned featured storylines and professional wrestling matches that involved different wrestlers from pre-existing scripted feuds and storylines. Storylines were produced on ROH's weekly television programme Ring of Honor Wrestling.

== Results ==
No.	Results	Stipulations	Times
1^{D}	Brent Albright defeated Tank Toland (with Larry Sweeney and Bobby Dempsey)	Singles match	6:48
2	Takeshi Morishima (c) defeated B. J. Whitmer by pinfall	Singles match for the ROH World Championship	2:50
3	Naomichi Marufuji defeated Rocky Romero by pinfall	Singles match	16:04
4^{D}	Davey Richards defeated Erick Stevens by submission	Singles match	10:04
5	The Briscoe Brothers (Jay Briscoe and Mark Briscoe) (c) defeated Claudio Castagnoli and Matt Sydal by pinfall	Tag team match for the ROH World Tag Team Championship	20:11
6^{D}	Sara Del Rey defeated Daizee Haze	Women of Honor Singles match	5:50
7^{D}	Kevin Steen and El Generico defeated The Irish Airborne (Jake Crist and Dave Crist), Pelle Primeau and Mitch Franklin, and Jimmy Rave and Adam Pearce (with Shane Hagadorn)	Tag team scramble match	7:33
8	Roderick Strong defeated Delirious by pinfall	Singles match	21:38
9	Takeshi Morishima and Bryan Danielson defeated Nigel McGuinness and Kenta by submission	Tag team match	26:31
(c) / – the champion(s) heading into the match; D / – this was a dark match

== See also ==
- 2007 in professional wrestling
- List of Ring of Honor pay-per-view events
