= The Driven =

Irish rock band

The Driven were an Irish rock band, possibly best known for their 1996 single Jesus Loves You More If You Can Drive. From 1995 to 1998, the band consisted of Brendan Markham (vocals, guitar), Darren Mullins (lead guitar), Ned Kennedy (drums) and Paul Power (bass). After 1998, Ned Kennedy was replaced by Christian Best. Three of the members later went on to form a group called Citizen.

== History ==
Prior to forming The Driven in 1987 (then known as The Drive), Brendan had been the driving force behind the town of Rathkeale's first modern rock group, A Clockwork Orange. This group had Brendan on vocals, Noel O'Shea on drums, Niall Mooney on guitar and Peter O'Connor on bass. After A Clockwork Orange split (circa 1985), Brendan left Ireland for Greece and, on his return in 1987, approached Pat Madigan, Ned Kennedy and Noel Brennan with the idea of forming a new rock group. They all accepted and The Drive was born.

The newly formed band played their first gig supporting Newcastlewest's Cloud 9 at the 1987 Rathkeale Soccer Club's annual dinner. The gig was a success and the band's next public performance was in a talent show in Foynes. The Drive won the competition, securing a cheque for £100 as prize money.

The band were then approached by Ollie Hartnett (a local milkman) who expressed an interest in managing the band. This offer was accepted by the members and Ollie set about booking the band's future shows. One of these included entering the band in the 1988 Heineken Search for a Star competition which was held during the Rose of Tralee festival. The Drive won and with it were presented with £1000.

After a while Ollie and the band parted company but the band went on to come third in the Hot Press band of 1989 competition held at Sir Henry's in Cork City. The Drive secured a summer residency in Kiely's bar, Ballybunion.

The band recorded their first demo at Limerick's Xeric studios by Pearse Gilmore, who later went on to help The Cranberries secure their first recording contract. Over the next few years the band changed lineup and recorded demo tracks at Xeric studios but attracted little other than local interest.

Circa 1989-90 Brendan and "The Drive" travelled to Elephant and Castle in South London under the management of Niall Mooney where they played a series of Gigs. On discovering there was already a UK based Band called The Drive Niall added the "N" to the name to create the first official version of The Driven. The first gig with the new name was in a pub in The Elephant and Castle where they were told they could play after the last booked Band had finished if they were quick. After the main Band had completed their set the lights went on. The Driven hurriedly set up on stage with the help of the sound Engineer a young man by the name of Graham Spink an ex member of the cult band Medium Medium (Hungry so Angry)and sound man for Al Jourgensen's industrial metal band "Ministry", and started their set while the audience were in the process of leaving the venue. The first song was "Attitude". The impact of this powerful song and Brendans energy stopped the audience in their tracks and they started to return to watch this unknown band play their set. One of the members of the audience who remembered their name was an unknown Band Manager by the name of Rick Lennox later to manage Daisy Chainsaw and as an A&R manager to sign "Skunk Anansie" to One Little Indian. After this final gig the Driven disappeared back to County Limerick.

In 1992 Brendan returned to London on his own and formed a Band in The Elephant and Castle using local musicians, some of whom proved to be unreliable and gigs were missed. In another part of South London guitarist/singer Tim Artingstall who was writing and recording music with Noel Murphy and Graham Spimk under the name "The Red Priests" had started an acoustic music venue called "The Set" in Bar Flies a bar on Streatham High Road. Graham introduced Brendan to Tim and after a floor spot at the club, Tim so intrigued by the originality and energy of Brendan performance went to the Half Moon in Herne Hill expecting to see Brendan's Band. However, due to non attendance by the drummer Brendan played the gig solo. After the show a conversation ensued and Tim agreed to manage him and invited Brendan to support Eddie Tenpole of Tenpole Tudor the following month. Solo demos were immediately recorded at Tims small 16track home studio and Graham Spink agreed to help with the engineering. At this time Brendan and Tim formed an electric/acoustic duo and played various gigs under the name of "The Driven" getting a great response from audiences around London. Soon after Brendan returned to Ireland. Once again returning to London at Tims request to record demos with Guitarist Pimm Jones and former member of Hipsway, Witness, The Pleasurelords, Sponge and later Big Yoga Muffin, drummer Nick Jones later to sign to Creation with Heavey Stereo and currently with "The Jim Jones Revue" and Tim Artingstall playing bass guitar. The sessions produced a powerful demo but a band was never formed and Brendan returned again to Ireland shortly afterwards.

In 1994 Brendan had started playing with Darren Mullins (Guitar) and Paul Power (Guitar and Bass) and in a phone call to London Brendan invited Tim Artingstall to Rathkeale in County Limerick to get a taste of the new songs and witness the birth of the new line up.

The band re-formed as Rubbergutt in Rathkeale, Co. Limerick in 1995 with Brendan Markham (vocals, guitar), Ned Kennedy (drums), Darren Mullins (guitar, vocals) and Paul Power (bass, vocals). The group found themselves inspired by the Nirvana MTV acoustic session and set about recording the now legendary Rubbergutt - A Day in the Life demo at a small studio at Knapps Quay, Cork.

The band received very positive reaction to the Rubbergutt recordings including a Hot Press demo review that awarded the recording the accolade of one of the year's best demos. After sending a demo of the songs to Tim in London due to musical friction the band split in late 1995. Meanwhile, in London Tim Artingstall had made contact with Pete and Niki of DeMac Ltd via long time friend and music publicist Rolan Hyams. On chatting with Pete McCarthy Tim discovered he was from the same town in Ireland as Brendan. Ignoring Brendan's inspired name change Tim told Pete about a band from Rathkeale called The Driven and a meeting was set up to listen to the demo's. The couple had recently started an A&R consultancy and ironically were talking with Rick Lennox who was now working for Polydor records as an A&R manager recently appointed to the task of building their Indie roster. Brendan received an excited phone call from Tim in London explaining the interest and Darrin and Brendan dropped everything and jumped the first ferry to England.

They arrived at Tim Artingstall's flat on Streatham Common, South London and meetings were set up with DeMac Ltd. The two were introduced to Polydor by DeMac and an agreement was made for DeMac to take over management of the band. The band now had new well placed management and it seemed they were all set to go.

The band reformed in London as The Driven with Paul Power being replaced by Noel Brennan but within months Paul returned to the fold and Noel left. The band were offered demo time by Polydor and Graham Spink and Tim Artingstall were asked to produce the demo. Soon after a recording contract was offered by Polydor and the band signed a management contract with Pete and Nikki of DeMac Ltd, who had played the original demo to Lucian Grange and Rick Lennox. The Rubbergutt demo became known as The Cork Session and was widely regarded as being a recording that showed the band had great potential and that Brendan was a songwriter with unique talent.

The band spent 1996 and 1997 touring all over the UK and Europe supporting Skunk Anansie, Stereophonics, The Levellers and Kula Shaker amongst others whilst promoting their eponymously titled debut album. The album was recorded at Westside Studios, Holland Park, London and was produced by John Kelly. The album was released in France and other European countries but never made the record stores in either Ireland or the UK.

The French Connection proved to be a good one and the band's album sold out with in a few days, amongst other appearances, RTL the Paris radio station asked The Driven to support Texas on a live broadcast from their Studios in Paris.

In 1998 the band's recording contract was terminated by Polydor and the band split. Brendan, Paul and Darrin remained in Ireland and re-formed over the next few years in various guises. At this point, Ned Kennedy relocated to London and is now a forensic scientist.

Brendan Markham went on to sign with Sony Europe as solo act with new Manager Henry Padovani. He toured extensively in Europe with great acts including Sting and released one album.

Tim Artingstall formed The Label 23 Records and went on to manage various other bands including: 100 Moments (Gale Paridjanian later of Turin Brakes), Stash including Zac Ware (now with The Proclaimers), Isobel Morris (Bruise) and The Land Speed Loungers. Left music in 2001 to start "Art Construction" a successful London Based Construction company.

In 2010, Darrin and Paul formed Pavlov's Dogs and released their debut album in 2011.

== Discography ==
- The Driven (Album) Polydor 539271-2
- Secret Police (CD single) Polydor 571351-2
- Secret Police (7" vinyl) Polydor 571350-7
- Seubles And Mushes (CD single) Polydor 577683-2
- Seubles And Mushes (10" vinyl) Polydor 577683-0
- Jesus Loves You More If You Can Drive (CD single) Polydor 5752252
- Jesus Loves You More If You Can Drive (7" vinyl) Polydor 5752247

== Chart positions ==
- "Jesus Loves You More if You Can Drive" (UK No. 194)
- "Monkey in a Cage" (UK No. 162)
- "Secret Police" (UK No. 179)
