= Cueshé =

Filipino pop rock band

- Origin: Cebu, Philippines
- Genres: Alternative rock; pop rock
- Years active: 1998–present
- Labels: BMG; Sony Music Philippines
- Members: Ruben Caballero; Jovan Mabini; Fritz Labrado; Cesar delos Santos
- Past members: Jay Justiniani; Mike Manaloto; Jhunjie Dosdos

Cueshé is a Filipino pop rock band from Cebu, Philippines, currently based in Manila. The band was formed in 1998 and hit mainstream in 2005. They are known for hit singles such as "Stay", "Pangako", "Ulan", and "Borrowed Time".

== History ==
Formed in 1998 in Cebu by Fritz Labrado, Jovan Mabini and Mike Manaloto, the word Cueshé is a portmanteau of "Cue", from banana cue; a snack delicacy in the Philippines, which are skewered bananas coated with caramel, and the pronoun "shé" (pronounced shay) is a reference to their former vocalist, a female, who joined in 1999. After the female vocalist left with their songwriter in 2001, she was replaced by Jay Justiniani. They started out performing covers at small gigs such as debuts and weddings, sometimes even bringing their own sound system if their venues didn't have any. They covered songs by The Smiths, Soundgarden, China Crisis, Nirvana, U2, etc. They then started learning how to write and record their own songs.

On December 24, 2001, Justiniani was severely injured in a motorcycle accident. To make ends meet, Labrado became a jeepney driver with Mabini as his assistant, Manaloto traded imported cigarettes to local bars in Cebu, while the rest focused on their studies. Still, they continued their weekly jamming sessions. Jhunjie Dosdos and Ruben Caballero were later recruited in 2002 and 2003 respectively. With the addition of Dosdos and Caballero, the band now features two vocalists, shared between Justiniani and Caballero, with Caballero primarily on lead, while Dosdos played keyboards and contributes backing harmony vocals.

In March 2005, Cueshé decided to move to Manila. To do so, their manager closed his talent agency to focus solely on the band, some members dropped out of college while others left their jobs. They were signed to BMG Records two months later. They were one of the first Filipino artists to be signed under the merger between BMG Records and Sony Music. Their song "Stay" became Cueshé's debut single. The group then achieved hit singles ("Stay", "Sorry", "Ulan", "Can't Let You Go" and "24 Hours"), a double platinum album (Half Empty Half Full), and multiple accolades within the span of a year. Their style of music led them to be associated with the slang term pogi rock. The band also contributed to The Eraserheads' tribute album, Ultraelectromagneticjam!: The Music Of The Eraserheads, on which they sang their own rendition of "Hard To Believe" (originally from the album Sticker Happy; released in 1997).

Less than a year later, the band released their second album, Back to Me. The new album contained ten new tracks, all of which were written by the band members themselves. The first single from the album was of the same title, followed by three more singles "Borrowed Time", "Bakit?" and "Pasensiya Na". Being fans of The Beatles, they also did a cover of the John Lennon hit single "Jealous Guy". In 2008, a third album was released entitled Driven, which spawned the three singles "BMD", "There Was You" and "Minsan". In 2010 the band released their fourth and latest album Life, containing the singles "Pangako", "Lupit", and "Sana".

The band also recorded the theme song of the Philippine television series Asian Treasures entitled "Walang Yamang (Mas Hihigit Sa 'Yo)", which is included in the repackaged version of their album Back to Me.

In 2015, the band released a new single titled "Ikaw Lamang" and announced they were to release a new album soon. The music video premiered in September 2015. Since 2015, they have focused on their live performances, performing at regional music festivals and other events.

In 2025, the band was chosen to perform the theme song for the 2025–26 PBA season entitled, Solid. They performed the song live on the opening ceremony of the season on October 5, 2025.

== Members ==
- Ruben Caballero — lead vocals, rhythm guitar (2003–present)
- Jovan Mabini — lead guitar (1998–present), backing vocals (2012–present)
- Fritz Labrado — bass guitar (1998–present), backing vocals (2015–present)
- Cesar delos Santos — drums (2012–present)

=== Former members ===
- Jay Justiniani — vocals (2001–2015)
- Mike Manaloto — drums (1998–2012)
- Jhunjie Dosdos — keyboards, backing vocals (2002–2012)

== Discography ==
=== Albums ===
- Half Empty Half Full (2005)
- Back to Me (2006)
- Driven (2008)
- Life (2010)

== Awards and nominations ==
Year	Award giving body	Category	Nominated work	Results	Ref.
2005	BOMB FM Awards	Song of the Year	"Stay"	Won	
2005	BOMB FM Awards	Band of the Year	—N/a	Won	
2005	NU Rock Awards	Rising Sun Award	—N/a	Nominated	
2005	SOP Music Awards	Breakthrough Recording	—N/a	Won	
2006	MYX Music Awards	Favorite Song	"Stay"	Won	
2006	MYX Music Awards	Favorite Artist	—N/a	Won	
2006	MYX Music Awards	Favorite Group	—N/a	Won	
2006	MYX Music Awards	Favorite New Artist	—N/a	Nominated	
2006	MTV Pilipinas Music Awards	Smart Texter's Choice Hitmaker of the Year	—N/a	Won	
2006	SOP Pasiklaband	Band of the Year	—N/a	Won	
2009	PMPC Star Awards for Music	Duo / Group of the Year	Driven	Nominated	
2009	PMPC Star Awards for Music	Alternative Album of the Year	Driven	Nominated	
2011	PMPC Star Awards for Music	Duo / Group of the Year	—N/a	Nominated	
2011	PMPC Star Awards for Music	Rock Artist of the Year	—N/a	Nominated	

- ASAP 2nd Platinum Circle
  - 2006: Double Platinum Half Empty Half Full
- ASAP 24K Gold Award
  - 2007: Gold album Back to Me
  - 2006: Platinum Ultraelectromagneticjam
