= ROH Driven =

- Promotions: Ring of Honor
- First event: Driven (2007)
- Last event: Driven (2008)

ROH Driven was a professional wrestling pay-per-view (PPV) event produced by Ring of Honor.

== Events ==
#	Event	Date	City	Venue	Main Event
1	Driven	June 23, 2007 (taped); September 21, 2007 (aired)	Chicago Ridge, Illinois	Frontier Fieldhouse	Bryan Danielson vs. Nigel McGuinness
2	Driven 2008	September 19, 2008 (taped); November 14, 2008 (aired)	Boston, Massachusetts	Case Gym, Boston University	The Age of the Fall (Jimmy Jacobs and Tyler Black) (c) vs. Kevin Steen and El Generico for the ROH World Tag Team Championship.
(c) – refers to the champion(s) heading into the match
