= Driven (2008) =

- Promotional poster featuring Larry Sweeney
- Promotion: Ring of Honor
- Date: September 19, 2008 (aired November 14, 2008)
- City: Boston, Massachusetts
- Venue: Boston University
- Attendance: 650

Pay-per-view chronology
← Previous; New Horizons	Next → Rising Above

Driven chronology
← Previous; 2007	Next → Final

Driven (2008) was the second annual Driven professional wrestling pay-per-view (PPV) event produced by Ring of Honor. It aired on pay-per-view on November 14, 2008 and took place at Boston University's Case Gym in Boston, Massachusetts.

== Storylines ==
Other on-screen personnel
Role	Name
Commentators	Dave Prazak
Commentators	Lenny Leonard

Driven featured storylines and professional wrestling matches that involved different wrestlers from pre-existing scripted feuds and storylines. Storylines were produced on ROH's weekly television programme Ring of Honor Wrestling.

== Results ==
No.	Results	Stipulations	Times
1^{D}	Ernie Osiris defeated Frankie Arion	Singles match	—
2^{D}	Bob Evans defeated Alex Payne	Singles match	—
3^{D}	Chasyn Rance (with The YRR) defeated Grizzly Redwood	Singles match	—
4	Austin Aries defeated Delirious (with Jimmy Jacobs) by submission	Singles match	6:45
5	Sara Del Rey (with Larry Sweeney, Chris Hero, Adam Pearce and Eddie Edwards) defeated Jessie McKay	Women of Honor Singles match	0:40
6	Brent Albright and Erick Stevens defeated Sweet & Sour Inc. (Adam Pearce and Eddie Edwards) (with Larry Sweeney, Chris Hero and Shane Hagadorn)	Tag team match	4:04
7	Chris Hero (with Shane Hagadorn and Eddie Edwards) defeated Jerry Lynn	Singles match	9:20
8	Bryan Danielson defeated Claudio Castagnoli and Go Shiozaki (with Larry Sweeney)	Three-way elimination match	14:25
9	The Briscoe Brothers (Jay and Mark Briscoe) defeated The Vulture Squad (Ruckus and Jigsaw) (with Julius Smokes), The YRR (Jason Blade and Kenny King) (with Sal Rinauro), and Necro Butcher	Tag team scramble match	6:20
10^{D}	Daizee Haze defeated Madison Eagles	Women of Honor Singles match	—
11^{D}	Rhett Titus defeated Josh Daniels	Singles match	—
12	Nigel McGuinness (c) defeated Roderick Strong	Singles match for the ROH World Championship	24:19
13	Kevin Steen and El Generico defeated The Age of the Fall (Jimmy Jacobs and Tyler Black) (c)	Tag team match for the ROH World Tag Team Championship	20:27
(c) / – the champion(s) heading into the match; D / – this was a dark match

== See also ==
- 2008 in professional wrestling
- List of Ring of Honor pay-per-view events
