= Driven to Distraction =

Driven to Distraction may refer to:

- Driven to Distraction, a 1994 book on attention deficit disorder by Edward Hallowell and John Ratey
- Driven to Distraction (book), a collection of car reviews published by Jeremy Clarkson
- "Driven to Distraction", an episode of Inspector Morse
