= Driven to Destruction =

Driven to Destruction may refer to:

- Test Drive: Eve of Destruction, a 2004 racing game by the American video games studio Monster Games known in Europe as Driven to Destruction
- "Driven to Destruction", a song by the Polish band Riverside from the 2009 album Anno Domini High Definition
- "Driven to Destruction", a song by Send More Paramedics from the 2004 album The Hallowed and the Heathen
- "Driven to Destruction", a 2016 episode of MythBusters
