= Back to Me (Cueshé album) =

Studio album by Cueshé
- Released: August 2006
- Genres: OPM, pop rock
- Length: 53:44
- Labels: Musiko Records & Sony BMG Music Entertainment (Philippines), Inc.

Cueshé chronology
Half Empty Half Full (2005)	Back to Me (2006)	Driven (2008)

Singles from Back to Me
- 1. "Back to Me" Released: June 7, 2006; 2. "Borrowed Time" Released: June 15, 2006; 3. "Bakit?" Released: January 17, 2007; 4. "Pasensiya Na" Released: February 3, 2007

Back to Me is the second album by Cueshé, released in August 2006. It contains a cover version of the John Lennon song "Jealous Guy". the music video of the carrier single "Back to Me" was premiered exclusively on the music channel Myx on July 28, 2006. In October 2006, the band released their second single "Borrowed Time". The song "Walang Yamang (Mas Hihigit Sa'Yo)" which is included in the repackaged version of the album, was used as a theme song for the TV series Asian Treasures. In 2007, the album went gold (selling more than 15,000 copies nationwide).

== Track listing ==
No.	Title	Length
1.	"Borrowed Time"	4:10
2.	"Back to Me"	4:24
3.	"I Won't Let You Down"	4:08
4.	"All I Want"	4:37
5.	"I Do"	3:44
6.	"Bakit?"	4:49
7.	"Broken into Pieces"	3:20
8.	"Today"	4:50
9.	"If You Need Me"	4:06
10.	"Missing You"	3:49
11.	"Pasensiya Na"	3:46
12.	"Jealous Guy"	4:21
13.	"Walang Yamang (Mas Hihigit Sa'Yo)"	3:47
