= Kevin Owens and Sami Zayn =

Professional wrestling tag team

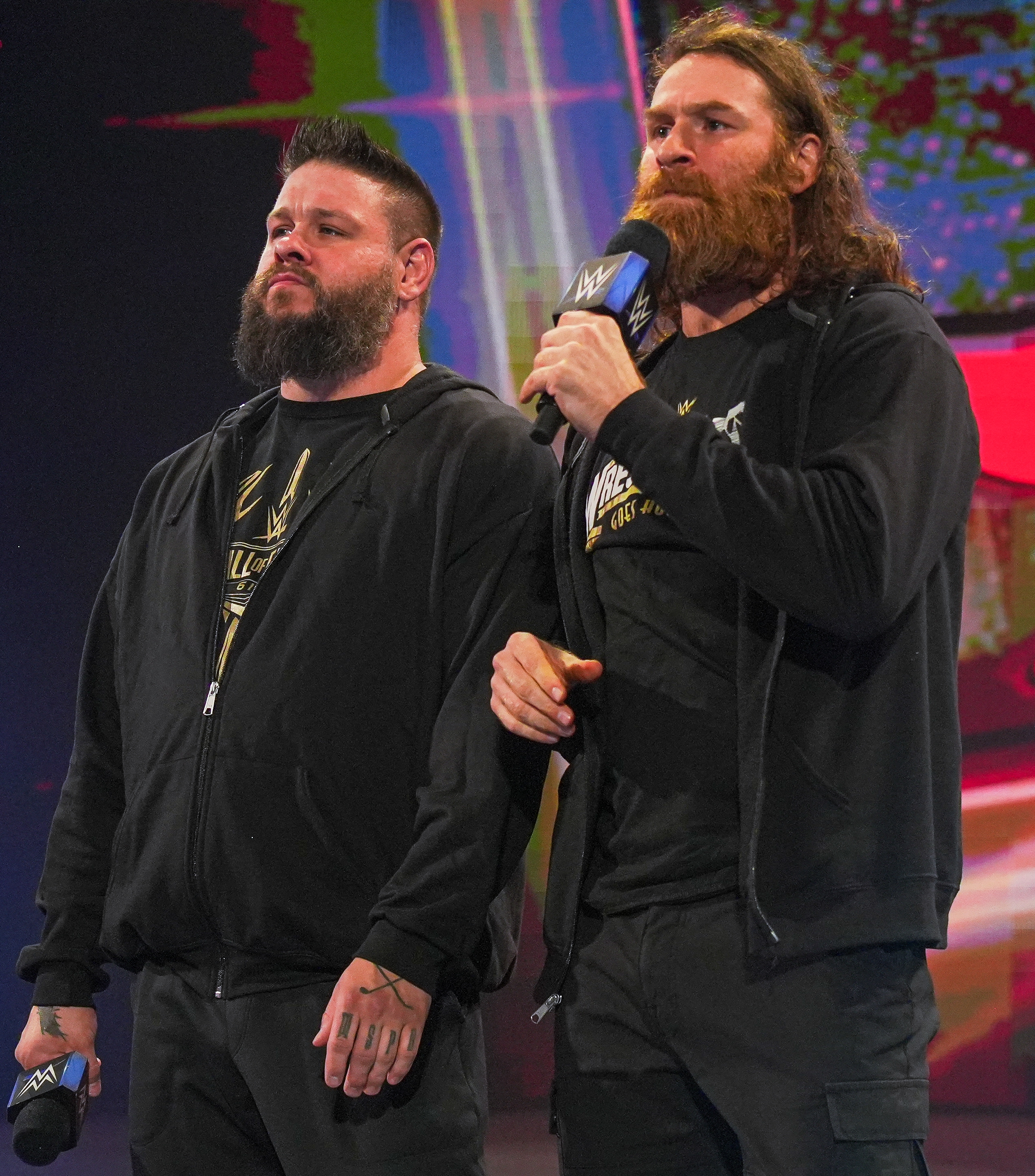
- Kevin Owens and Sami Zayn in 2023

Tag team
- Members: Kevin Steen/Kevin Owens; El Generico/Sami Zayn
- Name(s): El Generico and Kevin Steen; Kevin Owens and Sami Zayn; Steenerico
- Billed heights: Kevin Owens: 6 ft 0 in (1.83 m); Sami Zayn: 6 ft 1 in (1.85 m)
- Combined billed weight: 478 lb (217 kg)
- Hometown: Quebec, Canada
- Debut: February 17, 2007
- Disbanded: February 3, 2025
- Years active: 2007–2009; 2017–2019; 2023–2025

Kevin Owens and Sami Zayn were a professional wrestling tag team. They are both signed to WWE. The team originated in 2007 in Ring of Honor (ROH), where Zayn portrayed the luchador enmascarado (or masked professional wrestler) El Generico and Owens wrestled under his real name, Kevin Steen. Nicknamed "Steenerico" by fans, the duo won the ROH World Tag Team Championship in 2008. They also teamed up on the independent circuit, most notably in Pro Wrestling Guerilla (PWG), holding PWG World Tag Team Championship twice. Zayn and Owens signed with WWE in 2013 and 2014, respectively, and have since remained in the company, feuding or teaming up several times over the course of their careers in WWE; in the main event of WrestleMania 39 - Night 1, they won the Undisputed WWE Tag Team Championship.

== History ==
=== Ring of Honor (2007–2012) ===
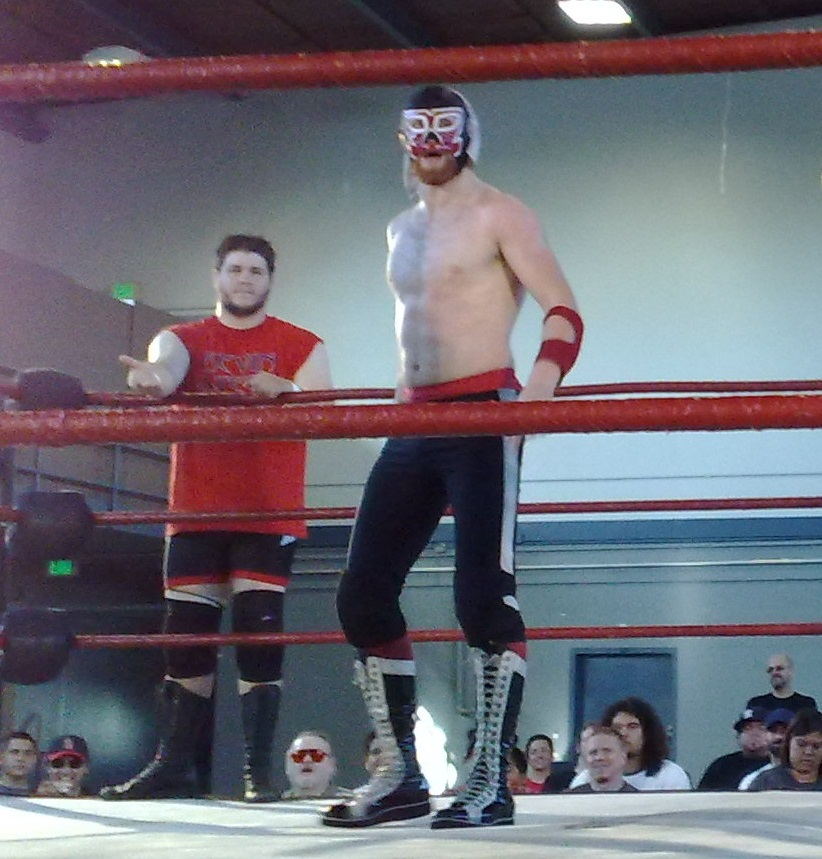
Kevin Steen (back) and El Generico (right) in a tag team match at a PWG event in 2008

Kevin Steen and El Generico debuted in Ring of Honor as a team losing to the Briscoe Brothers on February 17, 2007. On April 14, Mark Briscoe returned in the middle of the match between his brother Jay and Erick Stevens against Steen and Generico; Mark was beaten up by the duo and was pinned by Steen. On May 11, Steen (as a heel) and Generico (as a face) defeated Jason Blade and Eddie Edwards.

At Respect is Earned in a dark match, Steen and Generico defeated The Irish Airborne (Jake Crist and Dave Crist), Pelle Primeau and Mitch Franklin and Jimmy Rave and Adam Pearce with Shane Hagadorn in a Tag Team Scramble match. That same night, Steen and Generico brawled with the Briscoe Brothers, ending with Mark Briscoe suffering a mild concussion from a steel chair shot. At Driven, the Briscoe Brothers defeated Steen and Generico to retain the ROH World Tag Team Championship. Steen and Generico then suffered losses to the Briscoes at Caged Rage in a Steel Cage match, at Manhattan Mayhem II in a two out of three falls match and at Man Up in a ladder match. Their only tag team win over the Briscoes was at Death Before Dishonor V Night 1 in a non title Boston Street Fight.

On June 6, 2008, Steen and Generico participated in the one night tournament to crown new ROH World Tag Team Champions. They defeated Go Shiozaki and ROH World Champion Nigel McGuiness in the first round and Chris Hero and Pearce in the second round before losing to Jimmy Jacobs and Tyler Black in the finals. On September 19, Steen and Generico defeated Jacobs and Black to win the ROH World Tag Team Championship. They later lost the Championship to The American Wolves (Davey Richards and Eddie Edwards).

On December 19, 2009, at Final Battle 2009, ROH's first live pay-per-view, after a loss to The Young Bucks (Matt Jackson and Nick Jackson), Steen turned heel by attacking Generico. Steen and Generico's feud ended a year later on December 18, 2010, at Final Battle 2010, where Generico defeated Steen in an unsanctioned Fight Without Honor match, where he put his mask on the line against Steen's Ring of Honor career.

December 16, 2012 marked the final battle between Steen and Generico in Ring of Honor. At Final Battle 2012, the fourth Ladder War match took place at the Hammerstein Ballroom in New York City. What ended up being Generico's final match in Ring of Honor, Generico came up short against Steen after Steen hit the package piledriver on a ladder contraption built throughout the match by both competitors.

=== Pro Wrestling Guerrilla (2007–2013) ===
On July 29, 2007, at Giant Size Annual #4, Generico and Steen defeated Pac and Roderick Strong to become the PWG World Tag Team Champions for the first time. They successfully defended the belts for almost three months, losing them to the team of Davey Richards and Super Dragon on October 27 in England as part of PWG's European Vacation II tour. The next night, Steen teamed with Pac in an attempt to regain the belts from Richards and Dragon, announcing pre-match that if he lost, he would leave the company indefinitely. He was unable to win the bout.

Generico and Steen won the title for a second time, this time from The Dynasty (Joey Ryan and Scott Lost) on March 21, 2008, after Steen returned to PWG for an impromptu match. They became the first team in PWG history to be a part of the annual Dynamite Duumvirate Tag Team Title Tournament to defend the belts in each match they had. In the tournament finals, they lost to Jack Evans and Roderick Strong, thus ending their second reign. After Generico had agreed to a deal with WWE, he and Steen reunited one more time on January 12, 2013, by entering the 2013 Dynamite Duumvirate Tag Team Title Tournament. After wins over the Briscoe Brothers and Future Shock (Adam Cole and Kyle O'Reilly), they were defeated in the finals of the tournament by The Young Bucks (Matt Jackson and Nick Jackson).

=== WWE ===
==== First feud (2014–2017) ====
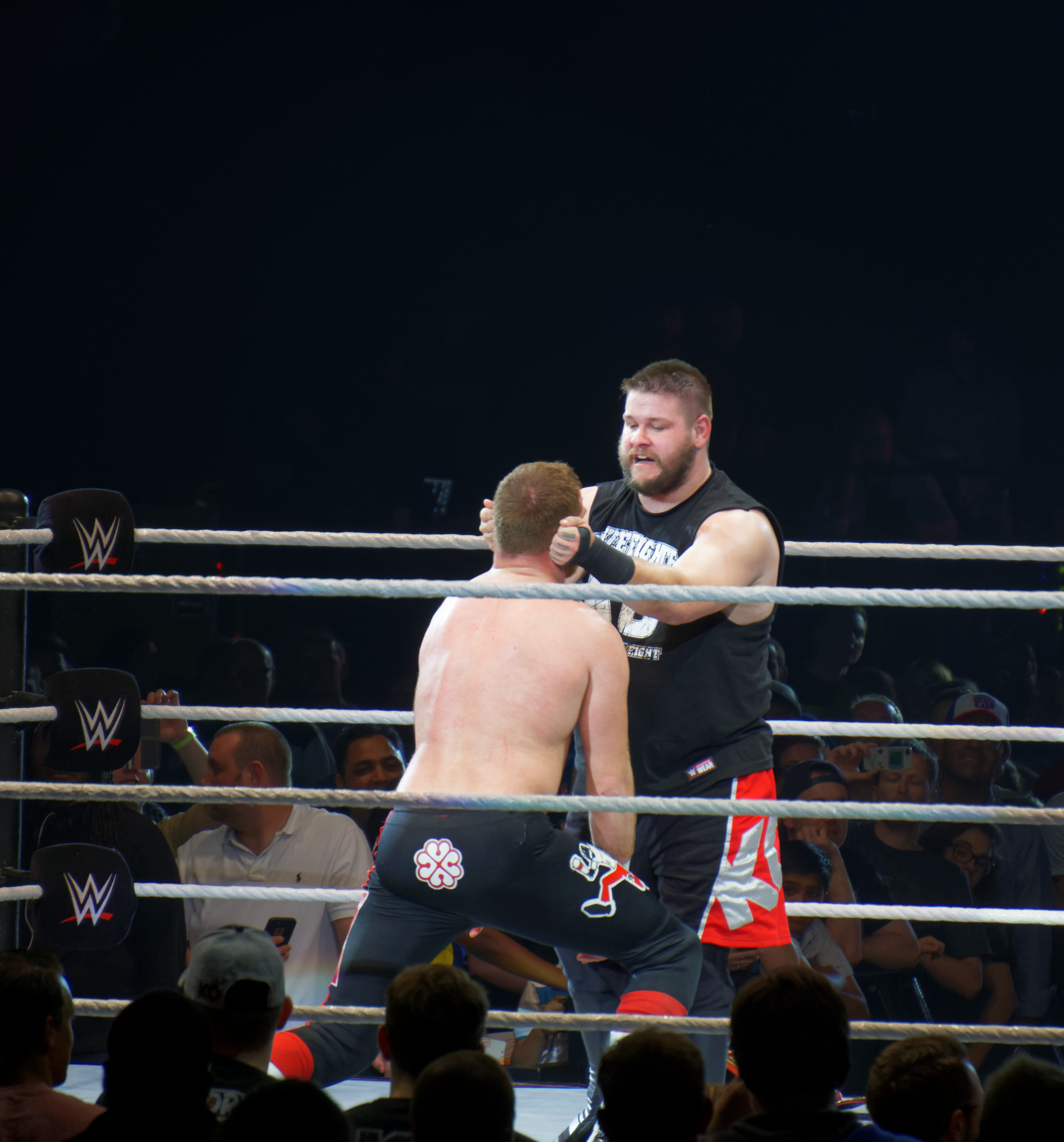
Owens taunting Zayn at a live event during their feud in 2016

Generico signed to WWE on January 9, 2013, where he worked in their developmental territory NXT as Sami Zayn, while Steen remained signed to ROH. On August 12, 2014, Steen signed with WWE and was also sent to NXT under the ring name Kevin Owens and debuted at NXT TakeOver: R Evolution in the opening match, defeating CJ Parker. In the main event, Zayn defeated Adrian Neville to win the NXT Championship. After a long celebration with the roster, Owens turned on Zayn, delivering a powerbomb on the apron and re-igniting their feud. On February 11, 2015 at NXT TakeOver: Rival, Owens won the title from Zayn via ref stoppage after continuously powerbombing Zayn.

In May 2015, Owens was brought up to the main roster, followed by Zayn the following year. On the May 16, 2016 episode of Raw, Owens and Zayn were placed in a tag team match to face Cesaro and The Miz in a winning effort, but Owens attacked Zayn immediately after the match. The two went on to have a grudge match at the Battleground pay-per-view, where Zayn defeated Owens. Both were drafted to the Raw brand during the 2016 WWE draft, but were traded to the SmackDown brand during the 2017 WWE Superstar Shake-up.

==== Reunion as villains (2017–2019) ====
On October 8, 2017, at Hell in a Cell, Zayn helped Owens defeat SmackDown Commissioner Shane McMahon in the main event, turning Zayn heel for the first time in his career and reuniting with Owens in the process. On the October 10 episode of SmackDown Live, Zayn said that Owens was right all along and called Owens his "brother". On the October 17 episode of SmackDown Live, Owens and Zayn defeated Randy Orton and Shinsuke Nakamura in a tag team match after Zayn hit a low blow on Orton. On the Survivor Series kickoff show, Owens and Zayn defeated Breezango (Tyler Breeze and Fandango). Later that night, they attacked McMahon during the 5-on-5 Survivor Series Interbrand elimination match, which ultimately led to Team SmackDown's defeat. On the November 28 episode of SmackDown Live, Owens defeated Orton in a no disqualification match after interference from Zayn, who was originally banned from ringside. On the December 5 episode of SmackDown Live, Zayn lost to Orton with Owens handcuffed to the ring ropes.

At Clash of Champions on December 17, Owens and Zayn faced Orton and Nakamura in a tag team match with their jobs on the line and both McMahon and SmackDown General Manager Daniel Bryan as referees. After a fast count from Bryan, Owens and Zayn won the match, thus keeping their jobs. Following Clash of Champions, Owens and Zayn embarked on a feud with WWE Champion AJ Styles, facing him at Royal Rumble in a Handicap Match and at Fastlane in a six-pack challenge, also including Baron Corbin, Dolph Ziggler, and John Cena, failing both times. During the Fastlane match, Owens and Zayn's rivalry with McMahon intensified, when McMahon, who was sitting at ringside, constantly interfered and broke up pinfalls attempted by both Owens and Zayn. This led to a match at WrestleMania 34 against the team of McMahon and Bryan, who made his in-ring return after years of retirement. At WrestleMania, Zayn submitted to Bryan's Yes! Lock. After they lost, they joined Raw, where they wrestled several tag team matches until Money in the Bank. After the event, it was reported that Zayn had to undergo surgery to fix torn rotator cuffs on his knee and shoulder, thus splitting the team and Owens was reported to undergo knee surgery as well.

On the June 4, 2019 episode of SmackDown Live, Owens and Zayn reunited to face The New Day (Big E, Kofi Kingston and Xavier Woods) in a losing effort. At Stomping Grounds, they defeated The New Day, represented by Big E and Woods. After Stomping Grounds event, the duo of Owens and Zayn drifted apart again, when Owens turned face and reignited his feud with McMahon. Zayn then went on to continue his work as a menacing, ruthless heel which helped him to win the WWE Intercontinental Championship on two separate occasions in 2020.

==== Second feud (2021–2023) ====
In March 2021, Zayn began a gimmick as a deranged conspiracy theorist that believed the WWE was holding him down. Soon after, Zayn reignited his feud with Owens after Zayn tried unsuccessfully to convince Owens to believe in his conspiracy theories. Owens then challenged Zayn to a match at WrestleMania 37, which Zayn accepted. At WrestleMania, Owens defeated Zayn. After Zayn interfered with Owens and Big E's tag team match against Apollo Crews and Commander Azeez on the June 18, 2021, edition of SmackDown, Owens demanded a match against Zayn at Hell in a Cell, which Zayn won. On the July 2 episode of SmackDown, Owens defeated Zayn in a rematch, which was contested as a Last Man Standing match to qualify for the men's Money in the Bank ladder match.

After joining The Bloodline in 2022 as the "Honorary Uce", Zayn began a feud with Owens by the start of 2023 and wrestled each other on the January 20 episode of SmackDown, only for The Usos (Jey Uso and Jimmy Uso) and Solo Sikoa to interfere. During the Royal Rumble main event, Roman Reigns, who questioned Zayn's loyalty in recent weeks, retained the Undisputed WWE Universal Championship against Owens and proceeded to have the rest of The Bloodline attack Owens after the match. Zayn refused to join the beatdown and eventually hit Reigns with a steel chair, prompting the rest of The Bloodline to beat down Zayn and thus ejecting him from the group, while Jey Uso walked out. On the February 3 episode of SmackDown, Zayn attacked Reigns and challenged him to a match for the Undisputed WWE Universal Championship at Elimination Chamber, which Reigns accepted. Zayn failed to win the title and was assaulted by Reigns and Jimmy Uso following the match until Owens appeared and saved Zayn. On the following episode of Raw after Elimination Chamber, Zayn offered an olive branch to Owens and proposed that they team up to bring down The Bloodline together, but Owens rejected it.

==== Reunion as fan favorites (2023–2024) ====
On the March 17, 2023, episode of SmackDown, Cody Rhodes invited Owens and Zayn to hash it out so that they can reunite to fight against The Bloodline, but Owens again declined to team up with Zayn. Later that night, Zayn confronted Jey Uso in the ring and was beaten up by The Usos. Owens ran out to save Zayn and embraced him, officially reuniting in the process. On the March 20 episode of Raw, Owens and Zayn challenged The Usos to a match for the Undisputed WWE Tag Team Championship at WrestleMania 39, which The Usos accepted. At WrestleMania 39, they defeated The Usos to win the Undisputed WWE Tag Team Championships, ending the Usos' historic Undisputed Tag Team Championship reign.

Owens and Zayn were drafted to the Raw brand in the 2023 WWE Draft. At Night of Champions, Owens and Zayn retained their Undisputed Tag Team Championship against The Bloodline (Roman Reigns and Solo Sikoa). They lost the titles to The Judgment Day's Finn Bálor and Damian Priest in a Pittsburgh Steel City Street Fight at Payback in September after interference from "Dirty" Dominik Mysterio, Rhea Ripley, and JD McDonagh, ending their reign at 154 days. They were unsuccessful in a rematch for the titles on the September 25 episode of Raw. Also at Payback, Rhodes got Jey Uso—who was on SmackDown and had quit WWE shortly before Payback—reinstated as a member of Raw and it was revealed that someone was traded to SmackDown for Jey. The following month on the October 13 episode of SmackDown, new SmackDown General Manager Nick Aldis revealed that Owens had been traded to SmackDown for Jey, in turn putting Owens and Zayn's tag team on hiatus. The duo, Owens and Zayn, reunited at a house show in Tokyo during WWE's tour of Japan on July 27, 2024, defeating The Bloodline's Tama Tonga and Tonga Loa in a tag team match.

==== Third feud (2024–present) ====
In October 2024, Owens turned heel by attacking Rhodes, starting a feud. On the January 27, 2025 episode of Raw, Zayn went for a Helluva Kick on Drew McIntyre, who moved, causing Zayn to hit Rhodes. Owens stood next to Zayn and then bumped his fist on his chest before exiting the ring. On February 1 at Royal Rumble, Owens failed to defeat Rhodes for the Undisputed WWE Championship. Three days later on Raw, after Zayn's failure to qualify to the Elimination Chamber match against CM Punk, Owens turned on Zayn for not helping him in his match against Rhodes at Royal Rumble. At Elimination Chamber: Toronto on March 1, Owens defeated Zayn in a unsanctioned match.

On August 2, 2026 at SummerSlam, Owens made his surprise return as a face and defeated Zayn in a fatal four-way match to determine the number one contender for the Undisputed WWE Championship also involving Finn Bálor and Gunther. On the August 21 episode of SmackDown, Owens lost to CM Punk for the Undisputed WWE Championship after interference from Zayn who turned heel by attacking both Owens and Punk.

== Championships and accomplishments ==
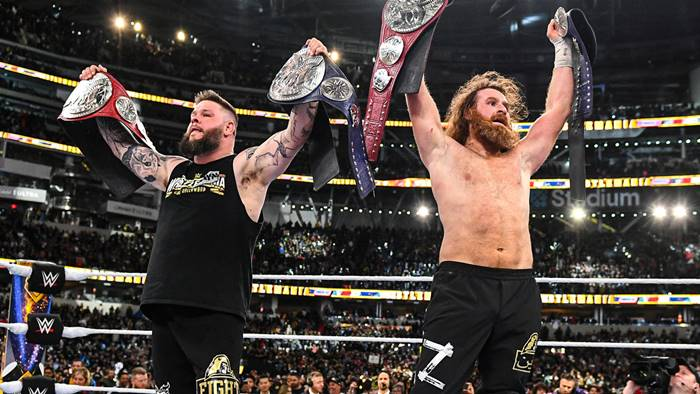
Owens and Zayn are former one-time Undisputed WWE Tag Team Champions, holding the WWE Raw Tag Team Championship and WWE SmackDown Tag Team Championship simultaneously.

- Pro Wrestling Guerrilla
  - PWG World Tag Team Championship (2 times)
- Ring of Honor
  - ROH World Tag Team Championship (1 time)
- Wrestling Observer Newsletter
  - Feud of the Year (2010) Kevin Steen vs. El Generico
  - Feud of the Year (2023) – against The Bloodline
- WWE
  - WWE Raw Tag Team Championship (1 time)
  - WWE SmackDown Tag Team Championship (1 time)
  - 16th Grand Slam Champion (under current format; 23rd overall) – Owens
