= Driven (Cueshé album) =

Studio album by Cueshé
- Released: April 7, 2008
- Recorded: 2008
- Genre: OPM; pop rock
- Length: 49:48
- Label: Musiko Records; Sony BMG Music Entertainment (Philippines), Inc.

Cueshé chronology
Back to Me (2006)	Driven (2008)	Life (2010)

Singles from Driven
- 1. "BMD" Released: April 2008; 2. "There Was You" Released: November 2008; 3. "Minsan" Released: 2009

Driven is the third studio album by Filipino pop-rock band Cueshé, released on April 7, 2008, by Musiko Records and Sony BMG Music Entertainment (Philippines), Inc.

== Background and composition ==
According to the band, Driven "has a deeper and better sound and is for those who believe in them". The album contains three songs written in Tagalog: "Minsan," "Alaala," and "Please Naman".

== Release ==
The album was released under Sony BMG Music Entertainment (Philippines), Inc. "BMD" was released as the album's carrier single. On October 29, 2008, "There Was You" was released as the second single off the album.

== Track listing ==
No.	Title	Length
1.	"BMD"	4:11
2.	"Back 2 U"	4:42
3.	"Minsan"	3:53
4.	"Drift"	4:10
5.	"Superstar"	3:21
6.	"Ala-Ala"	4:21
7.	"Please Naman"	3:28
8.	"There Was You"	4:42
9.	"One"	3:57
10.	"Quicksand"	5:05
11.	"Babe"	3:58
12.	"Over"	4:10
