= 2007 in professional wrestling =

2007 in professional wrestling describes the year's events in the world of professional wrestling championship.

== List of notable promotions ==
These promotions held notable events in 2007.

Promotion Name	Abbreviation	Notes
Combat Zone Wrestling	CZW	
Consejo Mundial de Lucha Libre	CMLL	
Georgia Championship Wrestling	GCW	
Juggalo Championship Wrestling	JCW	
Lucha Libre AAA Worldwide	AAA	The "AAA" abbreviation has been used since the mid-1990s and had previously stood for the promotion's original name Asistencia Asesoría y Administración.
Memphis Wrestling	PMG	
New Japan Pro-Wrestling	NJPW	
Pro Wrestling Guerrilla	PWG	
Pro Wrestling Noah	NOAH	
Ring of Honor	ROH	
Total Nonstop Action Wrestling	TNA	
World Wrestling Council	WWC	
World Wrestling Entertainment	WWE	WWE divided its roster into three storyline divisions, Raw, SmackDown!, and ECW, referred to as brands, where wrestlers exclusively performed on their respective weekly television programs.

== Calendar of notable shows ==
=== January ===
Date	Promotion(s)	Event	Location	Main Event	Notes
4	NJPW	Wrestle Kingdom in Tokyo Dome	Tokyo	Keiji Mutoh and Masahiro Chono defeated Hiroyoshi Tenzan and Satoshi Kojima in a Tag team match	
6-7	WWC	Euphoria	Bayamón, Puerto Rico	Rikochet vs. La Pulga	
7	WWE: Raw	New Year's Revolution	Kansas City, Missouri	John Cena (c) defeated Umaga in a Singles match for the WWE Championship	Final New Year's Revolution event and final Raw-exclusive PPV of the first brand split before all WWE PPVs became tri-branded.
14	TNA	Final Resolution	Orlando	Christian Cage defeated Abyss (c) and Sting in a Three Way Elimination match to win the NWA World Heavyweight Championship	
28	WWE: Raw; SmackDown!; ECW	Royal Rumble	San Antonio, Texas	The Undertaker won the 30-man Royal Rumble match by last eliminating Shawn Michaels to earn a world championship match at WrestleMania 23	The Undertaker chose to challenge for the World Heavyweight Championship
(c) – denotes defending champion(s)

=== February ===
Date	Promotion(s)	Event	Location	Main Event	Notes
11	TNA	Against All Odds	Orlando	Christian Cage (c) defeated Kurt Angle in a Singles match to retain the NWA World Heavyweight Championship	
18	WWE: SmackDown!	No Way Out	Los Angeles, California	John Cena and Shawn Michaels (Raw) defeated Batista and The Undertaker (SmackDown!) in a Tag team match	Final SmackDown-exclusive and brand-exclusive PPV of the first brand split before all WWE PPVs became tri-branded.
(c) – denotes defending champion(s)

=== March ===
Date	Promotion(s)	Event	Location	Main Event
6	JCW	West Side Wars	Long Beach, California	Corporal Robinson (c) vs. Trent Acid for the JCW Heavyweight Championship
10	N/A	Eddie Graham Memorial Battle of the Belts	Crystal River, Florida	N/A
11	TNA	Destination X	Orlando	Christian Cage (c) defeated Samoa Joe in a Singles match to retain the NWA World Heavyweight Championship
14	JCW	East Side Wars	Philadelphia, Pennsylvania	Trent Acid (c) vs. Corporal Robinson for the JCW Heavyweight Championship
18	AAA	Rey de Reyes	Naucalpan, Mexico	Rey de Reyes finals, six-man elimination match
(c) – denotes defending champion(s)

=== April ===
Date	Promotion(s)	Event	Location	Main Event
1	WWE: Raw; SmackDown!; ECW	WrestleMania 23	Detroit, Michigan	John Cena (c) defeated Shawn Michaels by submission in a Singles match to retain the WWE Championship
13	CMLL	50. Aniversario de Arena México	Mexico City, Mexico	Místico and Negro Casas (c) defeated Los Perros del Mal (Mr. Águila and Perro Aguayo Jr.) in a Best two-out-of-three falls tag team match for the CMLL World Tag Team Championship
15	TNA	Lockdown	Saint Charles, Missouri	Team Angle (Kurt Angle, Samoa Joe, Rhyno, Sting and Jeff Jarrett) defeated Team Cage (Christian Cage, A.J. Styles, Scott Steiner, Abyss and Tomko) with Harley Race as the gatekeeper in Lethal Lockdown match
27	PMG	Clash of Legends	Memphis, Tennessee	Hulk Hogan defeated Paul Wight in a singles match
29	WWE: Raw; SmackDown!; ECW	Backlash	Atlanta, Georgia	John Cena (c) defeated Shawn Michaels, Edge, and Randy Orton in Fatal 4-way match to retain the WWE Championship
(c) – denotes defending champion(s)

=== May ===
Date	Promotion(s)	Event	Location	Main Event	Notes
11	CMLL	International Gran Prix	Mexico City, Mexico	Último Guerrero defeated Alex Koslov, Atlantis, Dos Caras Jr., Dr. Wagner Jr., El Sagrado, Hirooki Goto, Jushin Thunder Liger, Lizmark Jr., Marco Corleone, Minoru Suzuki, Okumura, Olímpico, Pierroth, Rey Bucanero, and Último Dragón in a Gran Prix Torneo Cibernetico 16 Man Elimination Match	
12	ROH	Respect is Earned	New York City	Takeshi Morishima and Bryan Danielson defeated Nigel McGuinness and Kenta in a Tag team match	First ROH PPV
13	TNA	Sacrifice	Orlando	Kurt Angle defeated Sting and Christian Cage Three-Way match to crown the first TNA World Heavyweight Champion	First introduced TNA World Heavyweight Champion, new World title, replaced after National Wrestling Alliance's (NWA) Executive Director Robert Trobich stripped Christian Cage of the NWA World Heavyweight Championship and ended NWA's business relations with TNA earlier that day
20	WWE: Raw; SmackDown!; ECW	Judgment Day	St. Louis, Missouri	John Cena (c) defeated The Great Khali by submission in a Singles match to retain the WWE Championship	
28	WWE: Raw; SmackDown!; ECW	Saturday Night's Main Event XXXIV	Toronto, Ontario, Canada	Kane, Doink the Clown, and Eugene defeated Kevin Thorn, Viscera, and Umaga in a tag team match	note that this aired in the United States on NBC on June 2.
(c) – denotes defending champion(s)

=== June ===
Date	Promotion(s)	Event	Location	Main Event	Notes
3	WWE: Raw; SmackDown!; ECW	One Night Stand	Jacksonville, Florida	John Cena (c) defeated The Great Khali in the Falls Count Anywhere match to retain the WWE Championship	Last appearance of Rob Van Dam (until 2013) and Chris Benoit's final PPV appearance in WWE
17	TNA	Slammiversary	Nashville, Tennessee	Kurt Angle defeated Samoa Joe, A.J. Styles, Christian Cage, and Chris Harris in the King of the Mountain match for the vacant TNA World Heavyweight Championship	
23	ROH	Driven	Chicago Ridge, Illinois	Bryan Danielson defeated Nigel McGuinness in a Singles match	
24	WWE: Raw; SmackDown!; ECW	Vengeance: Night of Champions	Houston, Texas	John Cena (c) defeated Bobby Lashley, King Booker, Mick Foley and Randy Orton in Five-Pack Challenge to retain the WWE Championship	This event was notable for being on the weekend of the Chris Benoit double-murder and suicide case. Benoit, who was originally booked to face CM Punk for the vacant ECW World Championship, legitimately no-showed and he was replaced by Johnny Nitro
29	IGF	Fighting Now Bom-Ba-Ye	Tokyo, Japan	Kurt Angle defeated Brock Lesnar (c) via submission to win the IWGP Heavyweight Championship (IGF)	Brock Lesnar defeated Kazuyuki Fujita and Masahiro Chono in a Three Way match for the IWGP Heavyweight Championship. New Japan Pro-Wrestling stripped Lesnar of the title on July 15, 2006. IGF considered his reign still active and created the IGF version of the IWGP Heavyweight Championship.
(c) – denotes defending champion(s)

=== July ===
Date	Promotion(s)	Event	Location	Main Event	Notes
13	WWC	34th WWC Aniversario	San Juan, Puerto Rico	Carlito defeated Scott Hall in a singles match	
14	WWC	34th WWC Aniversario - Night 2	Mayagüez, Puerto Rico	Razor Ramon defeated Carlito and Apolo (c) in a triple threat match for WWC Universal Heavyweight Championship	
15	AAA	Triplemanía XV	Naucalpan, Mexico	Los Hell Brothers (Charly Manson, Chessman, and Cibernético) defeated La Legión Extranjera (El Mesías, Sean Waltman, and Kenzo Suzuki) in a Domo De La Muerte cage match	
15	TNA	Victory Road	Nashville, Tennessee	Kurt Angle (c) and Samoa Joe (c) defeated Team 3D (Brother Ray & Brother Devon) (c) in a Tag team match for the TNA World Heavyweight, X Division and World Tag Team Championships	
22	WWE: Raw; SmackDown!; ECW	The Great American Bash	San Jose, California	John Cena (c) defeated Bobby Lashley in a Singles match to retain the WWE Championship	Last event to feature the original Cruiserweight Championship; Last PPV appearance for Bobby Lashley in WWE until 2018
(c) – denotes defending champion(s)

=== August ===
Date	Promotion(s)	Event	Location	Main Event	Notes
5-12	NJPW	G1 Climax	Tokyo, Japan	Hiroshi Tanahashi defeated Yuji Nagata in a G1 Climax tournament	
12	TNA	Hard Justice	Orlando, Florida	Kurt Angle (c) defeated Samoa Joe (c) in a Singles match for Angle's TNA World Heavyweight and IWGP Heavyweight Championship, and Joe's X Division and World Tag Team Championships	
12	JCW	Bloodymania	Cave-In-Rock, Illinois	Insane Clown Posse (Violent J and Shaggy 2 Dope) and Sabu defeated Trent Acid and The Young Altar Boys (Young Altar Boy #1 and Young Altar Boy #4 in a six-man tag team match	Held in conjunction with the Gathering of the Juggalos
13	WWE: Raw; SmackDown!; ECW	Saturday Night's Main Event XXXV	New York City, New York	CM Punk and The Boogeyman defeated John Morrison and Big Daddy V in a tag team match	note that this aired in the United States on NBC on August 18.
26	WWE: Raw; SmackDown!; ECW	SummerSlam	East Rutherford, New Jersey	John Cena (c) defeated Randy Orton in a Singles match to retain the WWE Championship	Final WWE PPV event to feature Booker T until 2011
(c) – denotes defending champion(s)

=== September ===
Date	Promotion(s)	Event	Location	Main Event
31-2	PWG	Battle of Los Angeles	Burbank, California	Cima defeated Roderick Strong and El Generico in an elimination three-way match to win the 2007 Battle of Los Angeles tournament
3	AAA; NOAH; SEM	TripleSEM	Tokyo	Los Hell Brothers (Cibernético, Charly Manson and Chessman) went to a no contest with Mushiking Terry, Naomichi Marufuji and Ricky Marvin
9	TNA	No Surrender	Orlando	Kurt Angle (c) defeated Abyss in a Singles match to retain the TNA World Heavyweight Championship
15	ROH	Man Up	Chicago Ridge, Illinois	The Briscoe Brothers (Jay and Mark) (c) defeated Kevin Steen and El Generico in a Ladder War to retain the ROH World Tag Team Championship
16	AAA	Verano de Escándalo	Guadalajara, Jalisco, Mexico	Domo De La Muerte cage match
16	WWE: Raw; SmackDown!; ECW	Unforgiven	Memphis, Tennessee	The Undertaker defeated Mark Henry in a Singles match
28	CMLL	CMLL 74th Anniversary Show	Mexico City, Mexico	Eight-man Steel Cage elimination match
29	GCW	Fourth Annual Fred Ward Memorial Show	Columbus, Georgia	Bull Buchanan defeated Johnny Swinger (c) in a Six-Sides-of-Steel match for the GCW Heavyweight Championship
(c) – denotes defending champion(s)

=== October ===
Date	Promotion(s)	Event	Location	Main Event	Notes
6	ROH	Undeniable	Edison, New Jersey	Nigel McGuinness defeated Takeshi Morishima (c) in a Singles match to win the ROH World Championship	
7	AAA	Antonio Peña Memorial Show	Naucalpan, Mexico	La Legión Extranjera (Abismo Negro, Electroshock and El Zorro) defeated Chessman, Cibernético and El Intocable in a Domo De La Muerte cage match	
7	WWE: Raw; SmackDown!; ECW	No Mercy	Rosemont, Illinois	Randy Orton defeated Triple H (c) in the Last Man Standing match to win the WWE Championship	
12	N/A	First Annual Sensational Sherri Memorial Cup Tournament	Montreal, Quebec	LuFisto and El Generico defeated Stefany Sinclair and Kevin Steen in a tournament finals match	
14	TNA	Bound for Glory	Duluth, Georgia	Sting defeated Kurt Angle (c) in a Singles match to win the TNA World Heavyweight Championship	This event was also determine the first TNA Women's Knockout Championship, new title for Knockout women division
28	WWE: Raw; SmackDown!; ECW	Cyber Sunday	Rosemont, Illinois	Batista (c) defeated The Undertaker in a Singles match to retain the World Heavyweight Championship with Stone Cold Steve Austin as the special guest referee	
(c) – denotes defending champion(s)

=== November ===
Date	Promotion(s)	Event	Location	Main Event	Notes
10	N/A	NZPWI Invitational	Whangarei, New Zealand	IPW Heavyweight Champion Jon E. King defeated Cruz	
11	AAA	Guerra de Titanes	Madero, Mexico	El Mesias defeated Cibernético and El Zorro in a Three-way elimination match for the AAA Mega Championship	
11	NJPW	Destruction	Tokyo	Hiroshi Tanahashi (c) defeated Hirooki Goto in a Singles match to retain the IWGP Heavyweight Championship	
11	TNA	Genesis	Orlando	Kurt Angle (c) and Kevin Nash defeated Sting and Booker T in a Tag team match to retain the TNA World Heavyweight Championship	This event was Booker T's debut in TNA
18	WWE: Raw; SmackDown!; ECW	Survivor Series	Miami, Florida	Batista (c) defeated The Undertaker in Hell in a Cell match to retain the World Heavyweight Championship	
(c) – denotes defending champion(s)

=== December ===
Date	Promotion(s)	Event	Location	Main Event	Notes
2	TNA	Turning Point	Orlando	Samoa Joe, Kevin Nash and Eric Young defeated The Angle Alliance (Kurt Angle, A.J. Styles and Tomko) in a six-man Tag team match	
16	WWE: Raw; SmackDown!; ECW	Armageddon	Pittsburgh, Pennsylvania	Edge defeated Batista (c) and The Undertaker in Triple threat match to win the World Heavyweight Championship	This was the last PPV WWE broadcast in 480p standard definition. All WWE programming switched to HD in January 2008
17	CMLL	Sin Piedad	Mexico City	Shocker and Lizmark Jr. defeated Black Warrior and Rey Bucanero in a Best two-out-of-three falls Relevos Incredibles Tag team Lucha de Apuestas, hair vs. hair match	
24	WWE: Raw	Tribute to the Troops	Tikrit, Iraq	D-Generation X (Triple H and Shawn Michaels) defeated Mr. Kennedy and Umaga in a Tag team match	
29	ROH	Rising Above	New York City	The Briscoe Brothers (Jay and Mark) (c) defeated the No Remorse Corps (Roderick Strong and Rocky Romero) in a tag team match	
(c) – denotes defending champion(s)

== Notable incidents ==
- June 22–24 – Chris Benoit double-murder and suicide

== Accomplishments and tournaments ==
=== AAA ===
Accomplishment	Winner	Date won	Notes
Rey de Reyes	La Parka	March 18	

==== AAA Hall of Fame ====
Inductee
Antonio Peña
Rey Misterio Jr.

=== Ring of Honor ===
Accomplishment	Winner	Date won	Notes
Race To The Top Tournament	Claudio Castagnoli	July 28	

=== TNA ===
Accomplishment	Winner	Date won	Notes
Paparazzi Championship Series	Alex Shelley	January 14	
Fight for the Right Tournament	Eric Young	November 11	
Turkey Bowl	Samoa Joe	November 13	

==== TNA Year End Awards ====
Poll	Winner(s)
Tag Team of the Year	The Motor City Machine Guns (Alex Shelley and Chris Sabin)
Knockout of the Year	Gail Kim
Finisher of the Year	The Muscle Buster
Who To Watch in 2008	Booker T
Memorable Moment of the Year	Booker T debuts in TNA
Most Inspirational Wrestler of the Year	Sting
X Division Star of the Year	Jay Lethal
Feud of the Year	Samoa Joe vs. Kurt Angle
Match of the Year	Sting vs. Kurt Angle at Bound for Glory
Mr. TNA	Samoa Joe

=== WWE ===
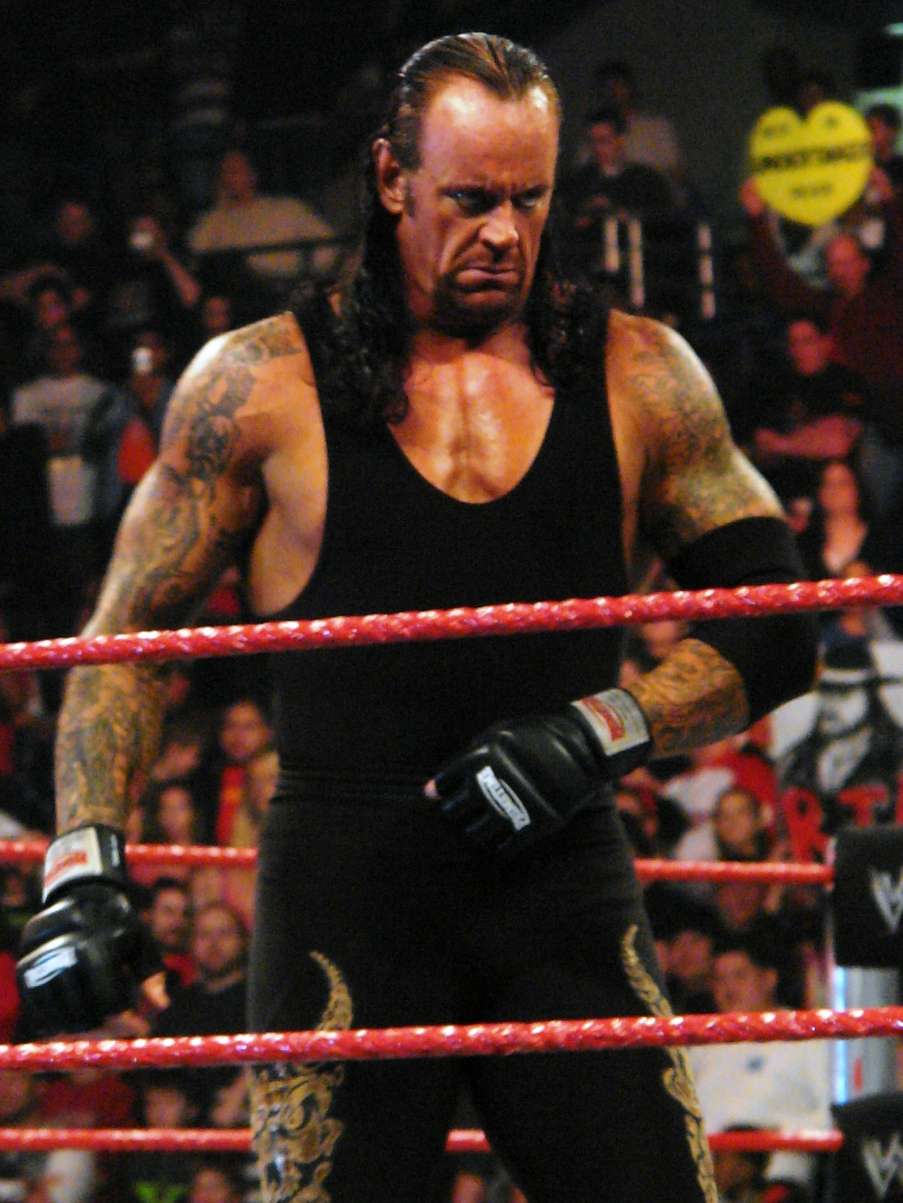
The Undertaker was the first person to win the Royal Rumble match from the #30th entrant in 2007

Accomplishment	Winner	Date won	Notes
Royal Rumble	The Undertaker	January 28	Winner received their choice of a championship match for either Raw's WWE Championship, SmackDown's World Heavyweight Championship, or the ECW World Championship at WrestleMania 23; Undertaker last eliminated Shawn Michaels to win and chose to challenge for his own brand's World Heavyweight Championship, which he subsequently won from Batista.
Money in the Bank ladder match	Mr. Kennedy	April 1	Defeated CM Punk, Edge, Finlay, Jeff Hardy, King Booker, Matt Hardy, and Randy Orton to win a world championship match contract. Mr. Kennedy, however, suffered a legit injury, and on the May 7 episode of Raw, he lost the Money in the Bank contract to Raw member Edge, who subsequently cashed in the contract and won SmackDown's World Heavyweight Championship from The Undertaker on the May 11 episode of SmackDown. Edge was in turn transferred to SmackDown.
ECW World Championship Tournament	Johnny Nitro	June 24	Nitro, who replaced Chris Benoit, defeated CM Punk in the tournament final to win the vacant ECW World Championship; previous champion Bobby Lashley was stripped of the title when he was drafted to Raw.
Championship Competition Tournament	Rey Mysterio	September 16	Defeated Finlay in the tournament final to win a World Heavyweight Championship match at Unforgiven, but was unsuccessful in winning the title.

==== WWE Hall of Fame ====
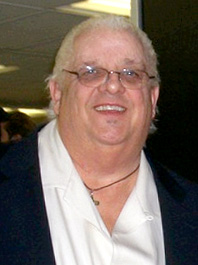
Dusty Rhodes

Category	Inductee	Inducted by
Individual	"The American Dream" Dusty Rhodes	Cody Runnels and Dustin Rhodes
Individual	"Mr. Perfect" Curt Hennig	Wade Boggs
Individual	Jerry "The King" Lawler	William Shatner
Individual	Nick Bockwinkel	Bobby Heenan
Individual	Mr. Fuji	Don Muraco
Individual	The Sheik	Rob Van Dam and Sabu
Individual	Jim Ross	Stone Cold Steve Austin
Group	The Wild Samoans	Samu and Matt Anoaʻi

== Awards and honors ==
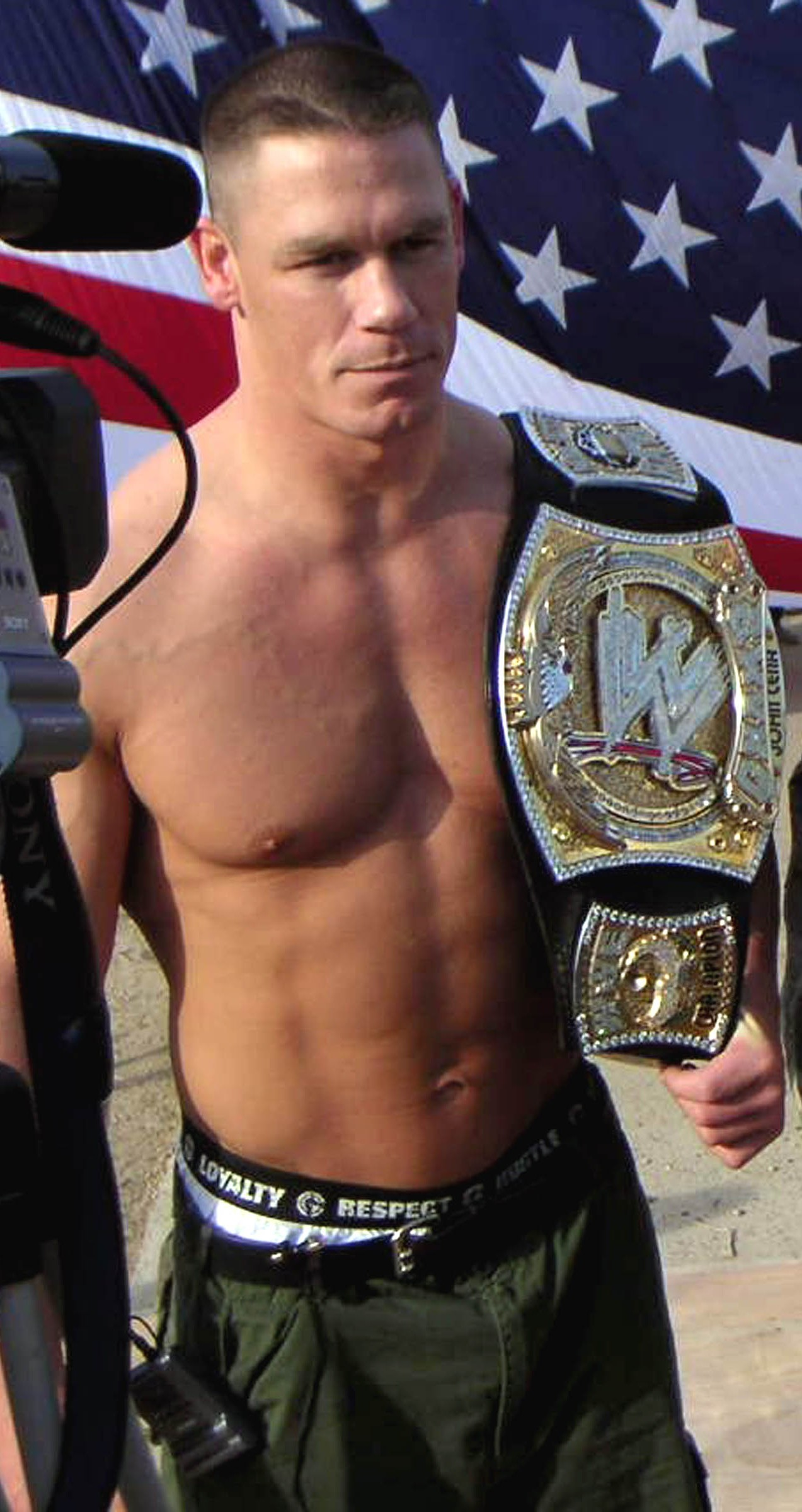
2007 PWI Wrestler of the Year and 2007 Wrestling Observer Newsletter Wrestler of the Year, John Cena held the WWE Championship throughout 2007 and won in the main event of every single PPV (excluding Royal Rumble) until Unforgiven in September

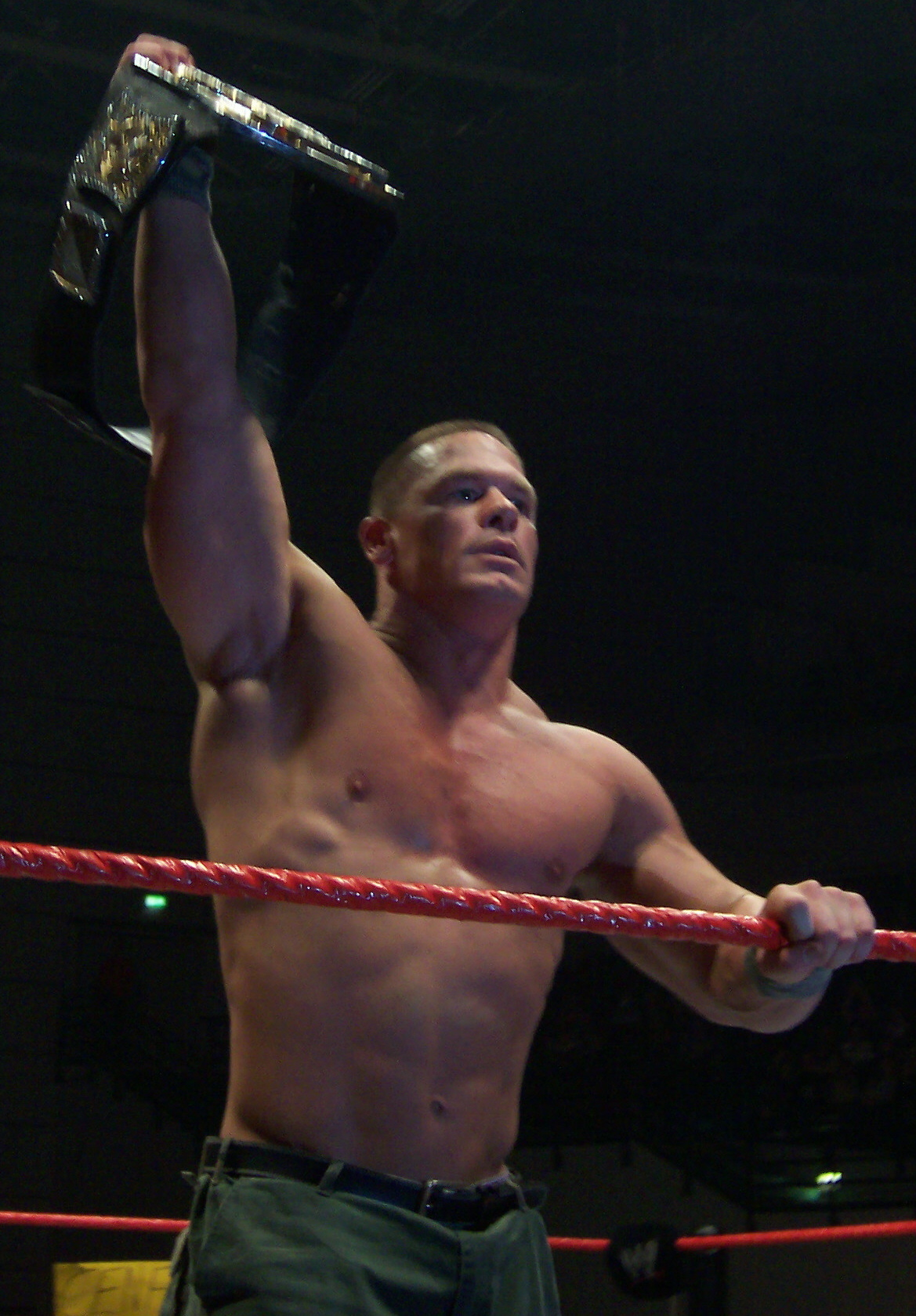
John Cena

=== Pro Wrestling Illustrated ===
Category	Winner
PWI Wrestler of the Year	John Cena
PWI Tag Team of the Year	Paul London and Brian Kendrick
PWI Match of the Year	John Cena vs. Shawn Michaels (Raw, April 23)
PWI Feud of the Year	Kurt Angle vs. Samoa Joe
PWI Most Popular Wrestler of the Year	John Cena
PWI Most Hated Wrestler of the Year	Randy Orton
PWI Comeback of the Year	Jeff Hardy
PWI Most Improved Wrestler of the Year	Candice Michelle
PWI Most Inspirational Wrestler of the Year	Jeff Jarrett
PWI Rookie of the Year	Hornswoggle
PWI Woman of the Year	Candice Michelle
PWI Lifetime Achievement	Nick Bockwinkel

=== Wrestling Observer Newsletter ===
==== Wrestling Observer Newsletter Hall of Fame ====
Inductee
The Rock
Evan Lewis
Tom Packs

==== Wrestling Observer Newsletter awards ====
Category	Winner
Wrestler of the Year	John Cena
Most Outstanding	Bryan Danielson
Best Box Office Draw	John Cena
Feud of the Year	Batista vs. The Undertaker
Tag Team of the Year	The Briscoe Brothers (Jay and Mark Briscoe)
Most Improved	Montel Vontavious Porter
Best on Interviews	John Cena

== Title changes ==
=== AAA ===
AAA Mega Championship
(Title created)
Date	Winner	Event/Show	Note(s)
September 16	El Mesias	Verano de Escándalo	

AAA World Tag Team Championship
(Title created)
Date	Winner	Event/Show	Note(s)
March 16	The Black Family (Dark Cuervo and Dark Ozz)	Rey de Reyes	
July 15	Mexican Powers (Crazy Boy and Joe Líder)	Triplemanía XV	

AAA World Mixed Tag Team Championship
Incoming champions – Cynthia Moreno and El Oriental
Date	Winner	Event/Show	Note(s)
November 20	Gran Apache and Mari Apache	Guerra de Titanes	

=== NJPW ===
IWGP Heavyweight Championship
Incoming champion – Hiroshi Tanahashi
Date	Winner	Event/Show	Note(s)
April 13	Yuji Nagata	Circuit2007 New Japan Brave tour	
October 8	Hiroshi Tanahashi	Explosion '07	

IWGP Tag Team Championship
Incoming champions – Wild Child (Manabu Nakanishi and Takao Omori)
Date	Winner	Event/Show	Note(s)
March 11	RISE (Giant Bernard and Travis Tomko)	New Japan Pro Wrestling 35th Anniversary Tour Circuit 2007 New Japan Evolution: New Japan Cup 2007	

IWGP Junior Heavyweight Championship
Incoming champion – Minoru
Date	Winner	Event/Show	Note(s)
July 6	Ryusuke Taguchi	New Japan Soul C.T.U Farewell Tour	
December 8	Wataru Inoue	New Japan Alive	

IWGP Junior Heavyweight Tag Team Championship
Incoming champions – Gedo and Jado
Date	Winner	Event/Show	Note(s)
May 2	Dick Togo and Taka Michinoku	New Japan Pro Wrestling 35th Anniversary Tour Brave New World: Hall2Days	

=== ROH ===
ROH World Championship
Incoming champion – Takeshi Morishima
Date	Winner	Event/Show	Note(s)
October 6	Nigel McGuiness	ROH Undeniable	

ROH World Tag Team Championship
Incoming champions – Christopher Daniels and Matt Sydal
Date	Winner	Event/Show	Note(s)
February 24	The Briscoe Brothers (Jay and Mark Briscoe)	Fifth Year Festival: Chicago	
March 3	Naruki Doi and Shingo	Fifth Year Festival: Liverpool	
March 30	The Briscoe Brothers (Jay and Mark Briscoe)	All-Star Extravaganza III	
December 30	The Age of the Fall (Jimmy Jacobs and Tyler Black)	Final Battle	

=== TNA ===
TNA World Heavyweight Championship
(Title created)
Date	Winner	Event/Show	Note(s)
May 13	Kurt Angle	Sacrifice	Angle defeated then-NWA World Heavyweight Champion Christian Cage and Sting in a three-way match to become the inaugural champion after National Wrestling Alliance's (NWA) Executive Director Robert Trobich stripped Christian Cage of the NWA World Heavyweight Championship and ended NWA's business relations with TNA earlier that day
May 14 (aired May 17)	Vacated	Impact!	Kurt Angle was stripped of the title due to a double-fall result of the three-way match at Sacrifice.
June 17	Kurt Angle	Slammiversary	Angle defeated A.J. Styles, Chris Harris, Christian Cage, and Samoa Joe in a King of the Mountain match to win the vacant championship. After the event, Angle's reign and the vacancy were no longer recognized and thus is viewed to be the start of the title's history. TNA counts Angle's previous reign to his credit without detailing why, thus giving loose recognition towards that reign
October 14	Sting	Bound for Glory	
October 16 (aired October 25)	Kurt Angle	Impact!	

TNA X Division Championship
Incoming champion – Christopher Daniels
Date	Winner	Event/Show	Note(s)
January 14	Chris Sabin	Final Resolution	
June 17	Jay Lethal	Slammiversary	
June 19	Samoa Joe	Impact!	
August 12	Kurt Angle	Hard Justice	
September 9	Jay Lethal	No Surrender	

TNA World Beer Drinking Championship
(Title created)
Unsanctioned championship
Date	Winner	Event/Show	Note(s)
November 11	James Storm	Genesis	
November 11	Eric Young	Genesis	

TNA World Tag Team Championship
(Title created)
Date	Winner	Event/Show	Note(s)
May 17	Team 3D (Brother Ray and Brother Devon)	TNA Today	
July 15	Samoa Joe	Victory Road	
August 12	Kurt Angle	Hard Justice	
August 27	Kurt Angle and Sting	Impact!	
September 9	Team Pacman (Adam Jones and Ron Killings)	No Surrender	
October 14	Christian's Coalition (A.J. Styles and Tomko)	Bound for Glory	

TNA Women's World Championship
(Title created)
Date	Winner	Event/Show	Note(s)
October 14	Gail Kim	Bound for Glory	

=== WWE ===
– Raw
– SmackDown
- ECW

Raw and SmackDown each had a world championship, a secondary championship, and a tag team championship for male wrestlers. ECW only had a world championship. SmackDown also had a title for their cruiserweight wrestlers. There was only one women's championship and it was exclusive to Raw.

WWE Championship
Incoming champion – John Cena
Date	Winner	Event/Show	Note(s)
October 2	Vacated	ECW	Vacated when John Cena suffered a torn right pectoral tendon
October 7	Randy Orton	No Mercy	Orton was originally scheduled to have a Last Man Standing match against John Cena for the title, but due to Cena vacating the title, Vince McMahon awarded it to Orton
October 7	Triple H	No Mercy	Defeated Randy Orton in the opening match after Vince McMahon accepted Triple H's open challenge on Orton's behalf
October 7	Randy Orton	No Mercy	Due to promising the match type, Vince McMahon made Triple H defend the title against Orton in a Last Man Standing match

World Heavyweight Championship
Incoming champion – Batista
Date	Winner	Event/Show	Note(s)
April 1	The Undertaker	WrestleMania 23	
May 8 (aired May 11)	Edge	SmackDown!	Cashed in his Money in the Bank contract that he had won from Mr. Kennedy on that week's episode of Raw. Following the win, Edge transferred from Raw to SmackDown!.
July 17 (aired July 20)	Vacated	SmackDown!	Edge vacated the title after he was sidelined with a legit pectoral injury.
July 17 (aired July 20)	The Great Khali	SmackDown!	This was a 20-man battle royal for the vacant title.
September 16	Batista	Unforgiven	Triple threat match, also involving Rey Mysterio
December 16	Edge	Armageddon	Triple threat match, also involving The Undertaker

ECW World Championship
Incoming champion – Bobby Lashley
Date	Winner	Event/Show	Note(s)
April 29	Mr. McMahon	Backlash	This match was a 3-on-1 handicap match also involving Umaga and Shane McMahon who teamed with Mr. McMahon
June 3	Bobby Lashley	One Night Stand	
June 11	Vacated	Monday Night Raw	The championship was vacated due to Bobby Lashley being drafted to the Raw brand during the 2007 WWE draft
June 24	Johnny Nitro/John Morrison	Vengeance: Night of Champions	Nitro, who substituted for Chris Benoit due to a "family emergency", defeated CM Punk to win the vacant championship. His ring name was changed to John Morrison during this reign
The title was renamed to ECW Championship.
September 1 (aired September 4)	CM Punk	ECW	Last Chance match.

WWE Intercontinental Championship
Incoming champion – Jeff Hardy
Date	Winner	Event/Show	Note(s)
February 19	Umaga	Monday Night Raw	
April 16	Santino Marella	Monday Night Raw	No Holds Barred match. Santino was "picked out of the audience" by Vince McMahon
July 2	Umaga	Monday Night Raw	
September 1 (aired September 3)	Jeff Hardy	Monday Night Raw	

WWE United States Championship
Incoming champion – Chris Benoit
Date	Winner	Event/Show	Note(s)
May 20	Montel Vontavious Porter	Judgment Day	Two out of three falls match

WWE Women's Championship
Incoming champion – Mickie James
Date	Winner	Event/Show	Note(s)
February 19	Melina	Monday Night Raw	
April 24	Mickie James	House show	Triple threat match, also involving Victoria
April 24	Melina	House show	Melina was awarded an immediate rematch because Mickie James pinned Victoria, who was not the champion
June 24	Candice Michelle	Vengeance: Night of Champions	
October 7	Beth Phoenix	No Mercy	

World Tag Team Championship
Incoming champions – Rated-RKO (Edge and Randy Orton)
Date	Winner	Event/Show	Note(s)
January 29	John Cena and Shawn Michaels	Monday Night Raw	
April 2	The Hardy Boyz (Jeff and Matt Hardy)	Monday Night Raw	Tag team battle royal, last eliminating Lance Cade and Trevor Murdoch
June 4	Lance Cade and Trevor Murdoch	Monday Night Raw	
September 5	Paul London and Brian Kendrick	House show	
September 8	Lance Cade and Trevor Murdoch	House show	
December 10	Hardcore Holly and Cody Rhodes	Raw 15th Anniversary	

WWE Tag Team Championship
Incoming champions – Paul London and Brian Kendrick
Date	Winner	Event/Show	Note(s)
April 17 (aired April 20)	Deuce 'n Domino	SmackDown!	
August 28 (aired August 31)	Matt Hardy and Montel Vontavious Porter	SmackDown!	
November 13 (aired November 16)	John Morrison and The Miz	SmackDown!	
John Morrison and The Miz were a part of the ECW brand, and as a result, the titles moved to the ECW brand. However, as part of the talent exchange between SmackDown and ECW, teams of either brand could challenge for the titles.

WWE Cruiserweight Championship
Incoming champion – Gregory Helms
Date	Winner	Event/Show	Note(s)
February 18	Chavo Guerrero Jr.	No Way Out	Eight-man Cruiserweight Open, also involving Daivari, Shannon Moore, Funaki, Jamie Noble, Jimmy Wang Yang, and Scotty 2 Hotty
July 22	Hornswoggle	The Great American Bash	Six-man Cruiserweight Open, also involving Jimmy Wang Yang, Shannon Moore, Funaki, and Jamie Noble
September 25 (aired September 28)	Retired	SmackDown!	Vacated by SmackDown! General Manager Vickie Guerrero, citing that Hornswoggle's status as Mr. McMahon's son and his diminutive stature would eventually jeopardize his well-being. The title was retired without an official announcement.

== Births ==
- November 29 – Azusa Inaba

== Debuts ==
- Uncertain debut date

- Pentagon Jr.
- Brittany Force

- February 17 – Lince Dorado
- February 18 – Salon (NEO)
- March 13 – Sanada
- May 18 – Arez (wrestler)
- July 29 – Rush
- September 8
  - Alex Colon
  - Buddy Matthews
- September 16 – Kazumi Shimouma
- October 13 – Aki Shizuku
- October 14 – Satoshi Kajiwara
- December 9 – Pinky Mayuka
- December 29 – Masato Inaba

== Retirements ==
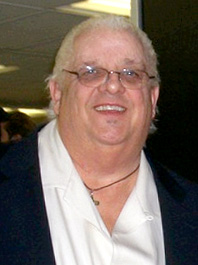
Dusty Rhodes

- Robbie Rage (1995–2007)
- Rebecca DiPietro (October 17, 2006 – March 22, 2007)
- Chris Kanyon (April 5, 1992 – April 5, 2007) (First retirement, returned to wrestling in 2009)
- King Kong Bundy (1981-May 12, 2007)
- Trinity (2002 – June 22, 2007)
- Dusty Rhodes (1967–July 22, 2007) (Returned for a match in 2010)
- Monty Brown (2000 – September 19, 2007)
- Maven Huffman (2001 – October 5, 2007) (first retirement, returned in 2015 until retiring in 2016)
- Mr. Wrestling II (1955 – October 13, 2007)
- Bob Backlund (1973–December 10, 2007) (First retirement, returned to wrestling in 2009 and wrestled his last match in 2018)

== Deaths ==
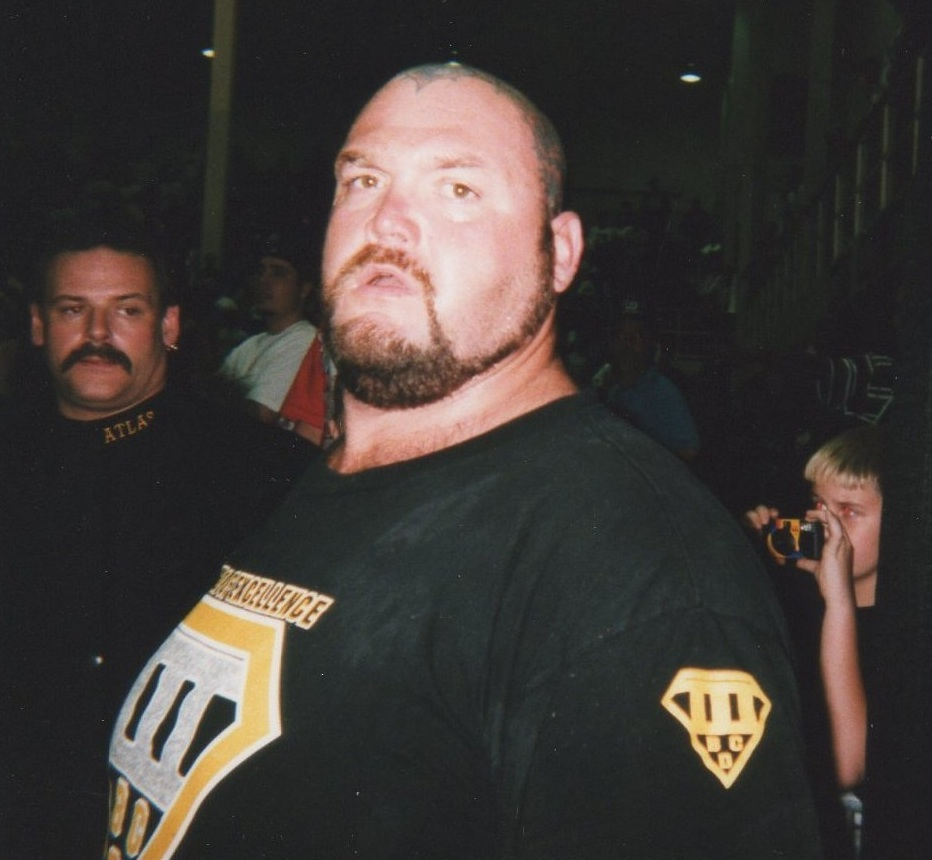
Bam Bam Bigelow

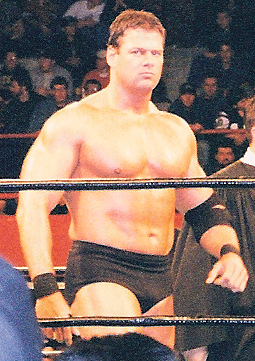
Mike Awesome

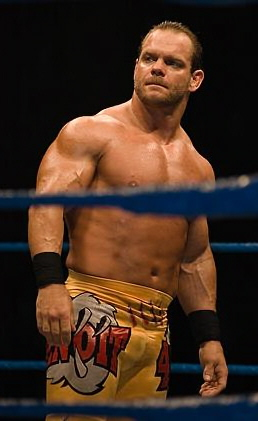
Chris Benoit

- January 4 – Cowboy Lang, 56
- January 6 – Yvon Durelle, 77
- January 9 – Cocoa Samoa, 61
- January 19 – Bam Bam Bigelow, 45
- February 3 - Charly Robinson, 81
- February 17 – Mike Awesome, 42
- March 6
  - Bad News Brown, 63
  - Ray "Thunder" Stern, 74
- March 8 – Black Shadow, 85
- March 10 – Ernie Ladd, 68
- March 13 – Arnold Skaaland, 82
- March 18 – Ángel Azteca, 43
- March 28 – Abe Coleman, 101
- May 7 – Sonny Myers, 83
- June 2 – Sandy Barr, 69
- June 15 – Sherri Martel, 49
- June 22
  - Nancy Benoit, 43
  - Biff Wellington, 42
- June 24 – Chris Benoit, 40
- July 15 – Devil Bhudakhan, 32
- July 18 – John Kronus, 38
- July 23 – Tor Kamata, 70
- July 23 – Ronnie P. Gossett, 63
- July 28 – Karl Gotch, 82
- August 11 – Bronko Lubich, 81
- August 13 – Crush, 43
- August 16 – Dewey Robertson, 68
- August 29 – Iron Mike Steele, 52
- August 31 – Karloff Lagarde, 79
- September 7 – Billy Darnell, 81
- September 10 – Enrique Torres, 85
- October 2 – Sean Evans, 36
- November 2 – The Fabulous Moolah, 84
- November 25 – Angel of Death, 54

== See also ==
- List of NJPW pay-per-view events
- List of ROH pay-per-view events
- List of TNA pay-per-view events
- List of WWE pay-per-view events
