= Michael Steele (disambiguation) =

Michael Steele (born 1958) is a United States politician and former Lieutenant Governor of Maryland.

Michael Steele may also refer to:

- Michael Steele (Canadian politician) (1861–1946), politician in Ontario, Canada
- Michael Steele (musician) (born 1955), bassist, songwriter, and singer, performed with The Runaways and The Bangles
- Michael D. Steele (born 1960), U.S. Army colonel
- J. Michael Steele, professor of statistics at the University of Pennsylvania
- Mike Steele (Washington politician) (born 1982), American politician
- Iron Mike Steele (1955–2007), American professional wrestler

== See also ==
- Michael Steel (disambiguation)
