= ROH Man Up =

Professional wrestling pay-per-view event

Man Up
- Promotional poster featuring The Briscoe Brothers
- Promotion: Ring of Honor
- Date: September 15, 2007 (aired November 30, 2007)
- City: Chicago Ridge, Illinois
- Venue: Frontier Fieldhouse
- Attendance: 1,200

Pay-per-view chronology
← Previous; Driven	Next → Undeniable

Man Up was a professional wrestling pay-per-view (PPV) event promoted by Ring of Honor (ROH). It took place on September 15, 2007, at the Frontier Fieldhouse in Chicago Ridge, Illinois, the site of the second PPV taping Driven, and first aired on November 30. The show takes its name from the popular catchphrase "Time To Man Up" of the Briscoe Brothers who are featured in the main event of the show. This PPV also marked the first appearance of Jimmy Jacob's new stable The Age of the Fall. The Wrestling Observer Newsletter named this the best overall show of 2007.

== Storylines ==
Other on-screen personnel
Role	Name
Commentators	Dave Prazak
Commentators	Lenny Leonard

Man Up featured storylines and professional wrestling matches that involved different wrestlers from pre-existing scripted feuds and storylines. Storylines were produced on ROH's weekly television programme Ring of Honor Wrestling.

== Results ==
No.	Results	Stipulations	Times
1^{D}	Ernie Osiris and Silas Young defeated Bobby Dempsey and Rhett Titus	Tag team match	—
2	Nigel McGuinness defeated Claudio Castagnoli, Chris Hero (with Larry Sweeney, Sara Del Rey, Tank Toland and Bobby Dempsey) and Naomichi Marufuji	Four Corner Survival match	18:00
3	Rocky Romero (with Davey Richards and Roderick Strong) defeated Matt Cross (with Erick Stevens and Austin Aries)	Singles match	4:45
4	Austin Aries (with Erick Stevens) defeated Davey Richards (with Roderick Strong and Rocky Romero)	Singles match	13:23
5	Roderick Strong (with Rocky Romero) defeated Erick Stevens (with Austin Aries)	Singles match	16:26
6	Takeshi Morishima (c) defeated Bryan Danielson	Singles match for the ROH World Championship	12:43
7	The Briscoe Brothers (Jay Briscoe and Mark Briscoe) (c) defeated Kevin Steen and El Generico	Ladder War for the ROH World Tag Team Championship	27:23
8^{D}	Mitch Franklin (c) defeated Alex Payne	Singles match for the ROH Top of the Class Trophy Championship	2:25
9^{D}	Daizee Haze and Amazing Kong defeated Lacey and Sara Del Rey	Women of Honor Tag team match	14:48
10^{D}	B. J. Whitmer and Brent Albright (with Shane Hagadorn) defeated The YRR (Chasyn Rance and Kenny King)	Tag team match	5:19
11^{D}	Jack Evans vs. Tyler Black ended in a no contest	Singles match	2:40
12^{D}	Jack Evans and The Irish Airborne (Jake and Dave Crist) vs. The Age of the Fall (Jimmy Jacobs, Tyler Black and Necro Butcher) ended in a no contest	Tag team match	06:50
13^{D}	Delirious defeated Matt Sydal (with Larry Sweeney)	Singles match	21:52
(c) / – the champion(s) heading into the match; D / – this was a dark match

== See also ==
- 2007 in professional wrestling
- List of Ring of Honor pay-per-view events
