= ROH Undeniable =

2007 Ring of Honor pay-per-view event

Undeniable
- Promotional poster featuring Nigel McGuinness and Takeshi Morishima
- Promotion: Ring of Honor
- Date: October 6, 2007 (aired January 18, 2008)
- City: Edison, New Jersey
- Venue: Inman Sports Club
- Attendance: 800

Pay-per-view chronology
← Previous; Man Up	Next → Rising Above

Undeniable was a professional wrestling pay-per-view (PPV) event promoted by Ring of Honor (ROH). It took place on October 6, 2007 from the Inman Sports Club in Edison, New Jersey and aired on pay-per-view on January 18, 2008.

== Storylines ==
Other on-screen personnel
Role	Name
Commentators	Dave Prazak
Commentators	Lenny Leonard

Undeniable featured storylines and professional wrestling matches that involved different wrestlers from pre-existing scripted feuds and storylines. Storylines were produced on ROH's weekly television programme Ring of Honor Wrestling.

== Results ==
No.	Results	Stipulations	Times
1^{D}	Alex Payne and Ernie Osiris defeated Rhett Titus and Mitch Franklin	Tag team match	—
2	The Age of the Fall (Jimmy Jacobs and Tyler Black) (with Lacey) defeated The Vulture Squad (Jack Evans and Ruckus) (with Julius Smokes)	Tag team match	05:38
3	Daizee Haze defeated Sara Del Rey (with Larry Sweeney, Chris Hero and Bobby Dempsey)	Women of Honor Singles match	3:52
4	Bryan Danielson defeated Chris Hero (with Larry Sweeney)	Singles match	11:08
5	The Hangmen 3 (Adam Pearce, B. J. Whitmer and Brent Albright) (with Shane Hagadorn) defeated Delirious, Kevin Steen and El Generico	Tag team match	11:04
6	Austin Aries defeated Roderick Strong	Singles match	20:57
7	The Briscoe Brothers (Jay Briscoe and Mark Briscoe) (c) defeated No Remorse Corps (Davey Richards and Rocky Romero)	Tag team match for the ROH World Tag Team Championship	18:15
8	Nigel McGuinness defeated Takeshi Morishima (c)	Singles match for the ROH World Championship	14:16
9^{D}	Claudio Castagnoli defeated Jigsaw	Singles match	12:22
10^{D}	No Remorse Corps (Davey Richards and Rocky Romero) defeated The Resilience (Matt Cross and Erick Stevens)	Tag team match	17:02
11^{D}	Necro Butcher defeated Jay Briscoe	Anything Goes Match	—
(c) / – the champion(s) heading into the match; D / – this was a dark match

== See also ==
- 2007 in professional wrestling
- List of Ring of Honor pay-per-view events
