= Michael Steel =

Michael Steel or Mike Steel may refer to:

== People ==
- Mike Steel (mathematician) (born 1960), professor in New Zealand
- Michael Steel, official of English company Hybrid Air Vehicles Ltd
- Miljenko Matijevic (born 1964), Croatian-American rock vocalist for the band Steelheart, also known as Mikey Steel
- Michael von Steel, actor on the gay vampire television series The Lair

== Characters ==
- Michael Steel, a fictional character in the 1942 film Little Tokyo, U.S.A.
- Michael "Mike" Steel, a fictional character in the 2001 film The Hole
- Ironclad (comics), also known as Michael Steel, a fictional character in the Marvel comic universe
- Michael Steel, a fictional character in the heavy-metal album The Crimson Idol

== See also ==
- Michael Steele (disambiguation)
