= Matt Cross (wrestler) =

American professional wrestler (born 1980)

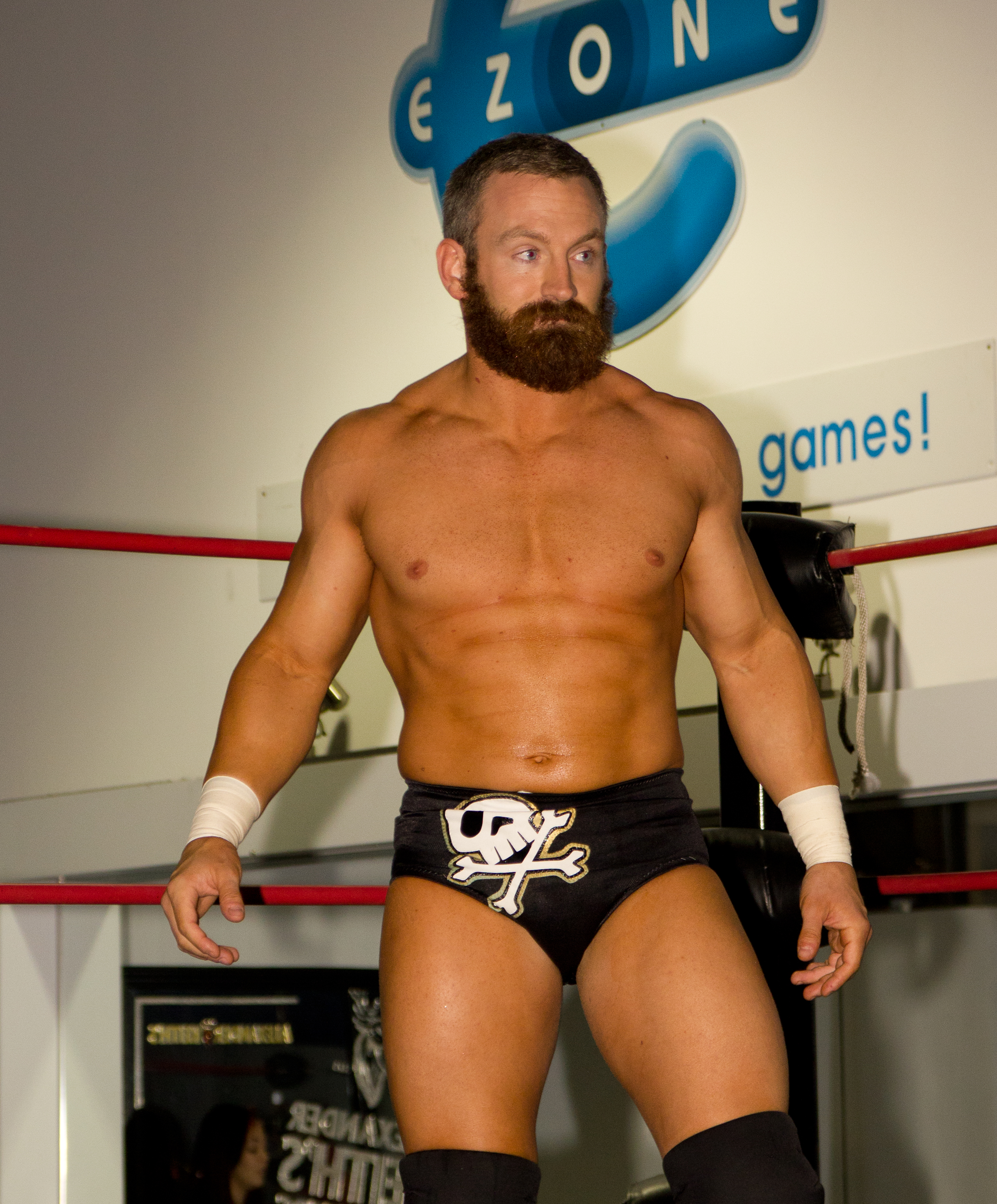
- Cross in 2012

Personal information
- Born: Matthew Capiccioni; December 31, 1980 (age 45) Brecksville, Ohio, U.S.

Professional wrestling career
- Ring name(s): The 18th Amendment; M-Dogg 20; Matt Cross; Raptor; Son of Havoc; Spartan 3000 B.C. Spartan 3000
- Billed height: 5 ft 7 in (1.70 m)
- Billed weight: 177 lb (80 kg)
- Billed from: Cleveland, Ohio; The Open Road; Sparta
- Trained by: J.T. Lightning; Cleveland All Pro Training Center
- Debut: August 21, 2001

Matthew Capiccioni (born December 31, 1980), better known by his ring names M-Dogg 20 and Matt Cross, is an American professional wrestler. He performs on the independent circuit – predominantly for Juggalo Championship Wrestling (JCW), where he is a former one-time JCW Heavyweight Champion. He has also worked with the National Wrestling Alliance (NWA), Exodus Pro Wrestling, WrestleCade, Deadlock Pro-Wrestling (DPW), Game Changer Wrestling (GCW), and World Wrestling Entertainment (WWE).

His main gimmick is that of an adherent of the straight edge lifestyle, a culture which he follows in real life.

== Early life ==
Capiccioni, of descent from the country of San Marino, participated in competitive gymnastics for ten years. In 1999, he won gold medals in both the rings and the vault at the AAU Junior Olympic Games.

== Professional wrestling career ==
=== Debut (1999–2001) ===
A fan of Extreme Championship Wrestling, Capiccioni was involved in backyard wrestling before enrolling at the Cleveland Pro Wrestling training school under the tutelage of J.T. Lightning. Upon completing his training, he took on the ring name M-Dogg 20, and began competing on the independent circuit.

=== Early independent work (2001–2009) ===
He wrestled for promotions including the Union of Independent Professional Wrestlers, where he defeated Jerry Lynn to win the vacant UIPW Championship on October 11, 2003. He formed a regular tag team with Piscura (who wrestled as Josh Prohibition) known as Youthanazia, and the pair won Cleveland All-Pro Wrestling (CAPW)'s North American Tag Team Championship twice, Xtreme Pro Wrestling's World Tag Team Championship twice, the International Wrestling Cartel's Tag Team Championship twice, and the NWA Upstate Tag Team Championship once. M-Dogg 20 also won the CAPW Junior Heavyweight Championship on November 9, 2003, by defeating H8 Pac. Youthanzia also wrestled for the Independent Wrestling Association Mid-South and Jersey All Pro Wrestling in 2004.

In 2006 he made his debut for Hawaii-based promotion Action Zone Wrestling at their one-year anniversary show in a match against another indy star in Super Hentai in 2006. The two would later return and team up at AZW's "Battleclash 2" in December. Matt returned to Hawaii and AZW in June 2011 for Anniversary Annihilation 6 where Matt took on AZW Heavyweight Champion (and 2004 Olympian) "Mr. Athletic" Jeff Cobb.

Capiccioni also wrestled for UWA Hardcore Wrestling as M-Dogg 20. He debuted as part of the company's second show. On February 16, 2007, M-Dogg unsuccessfully challenged Josh Prohibition for the UWA Canadian Championship, in a three-match also involving Sonjay Dutt. He defeated PUMA to win the UWA Canadian Championship at the Return of the Dragon show on July 28, 2007. Although he missed night one of UWA Hardcore's annual GP tournament, he made a surprise return on the second night of the tournament during the main event steel cage match. M-Dogg 20's return ultimately helped Osiris and Jerry Lynn win the match over the Prohibition Wrestling Alliance, a stable led by his former tag team partner Josh Prohibition. As a stipulation of the match, control of the company reverted from Prohibition back to Osiris, the original owner of the company. One month later at UWA's Return of the Phoenix event, M-Dogg 20 lost the Canadian Championship to Prohibition in a gauntlet match also featuring Rip Impact.

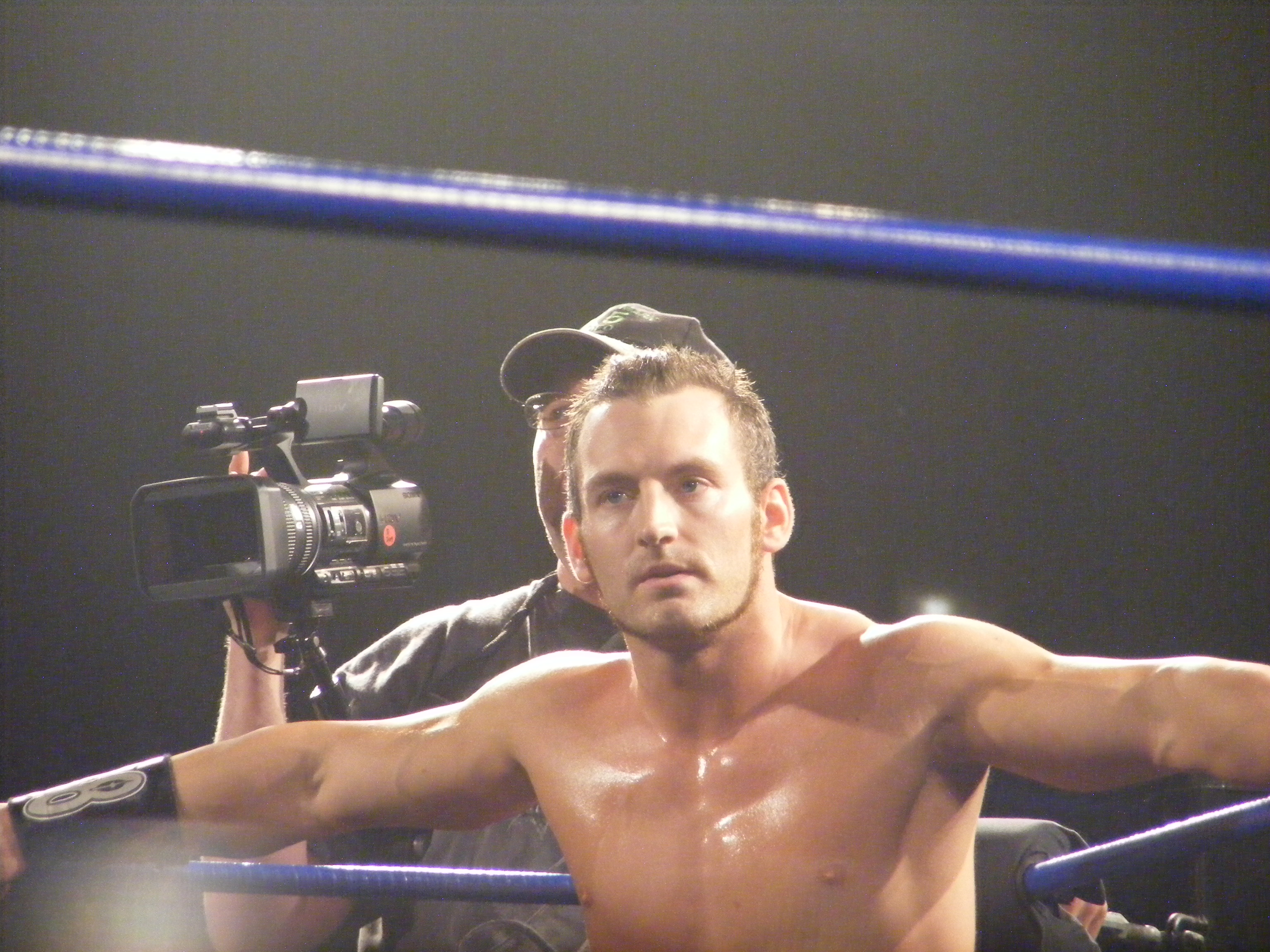
M-Dogg 20 at a Chikara show in April 2010

During November 2009, Capiccioni participated in the Hulkamania tour of Australia, using the ring name Spartan 3000 and took part in a best of three match series for a prize of US$25,000 with Shannon Moore. Spartan won the first match on November 21, and Moore won the second on November 24. The rubber match ended in a draw on November 26, resulting in a ladder match for the final match of the tour two days later, which Spartan won.

=== Combat Zone Wrestling (2002–2004) ===
He made his Combat Zone Wrestling (CZW) debut in 2002, appearing at Process of Elimination in April, and defeating Prohibition to qualify for the annual Best of the Best tournament. At the tournament itself on June 8, M-Dogg 20 made it to the second round, where he was defeated by Trent Acid, the eventual winner of the tournament. M-Dogg returned to CZW that September, and defeated Prohibition in a Tables and Ladders match at Ultraviolent Freedom Of Expression. At Night Of Infamy in November, a tag team match between the team of M-Dogg 20 and Nick Mondo and the team of Acid and Johnny Kashmere ended in a no contest. The following month, M-Dogg faced Sonjay Dutt and Ruckus in a three-way match to determine the number one contender to the CZW World Junior Heavyweight Championship, but the match was won by Dutt.

At Best of the Best 4 on July 10, 2004, M-Dogg 20 returned to CZW, attacking CZW Junior Heavyweight Champion Sonjay Dutt and stealing his championship belt. He attacked Dutt again at Possession in August, before he teamed with Jimmy Rave to defeat Dutt and Amazing Red at High Stakes 2: Always Bet On Black. At Night of Infamy 3 in November, Dutt defeated both M-Dogg 20 and Rave in a three-way match. At Cage of Death 6, M-Dogg lost to Dutt in a match for the World Junior Heavyweight Championship, forcing M-Dogg to leave the company per the pre-match stipulation.

=== Ring of Honor (2006–2009) ===
Capiccioni, as Matt Cross, made his debut in Ring of Honor (ROH) on October 7, 2006, at Motor City Madness in a six-man mayhem match, which was won by Pelle Primeau and also involved Jimmy Rave, Shane Hagadorn, and Dave and Jake Crist. His second appearance came the following month, when he lost to Christopher Daniels at The Bitter End. He faced Daniels again at The Chicago Spectacular Night 1 on December 8, in a four-corner survival match, which was won by B. J. Whitmer and also included Davey Richards. The following night, Cross and Daniels teamed together in a loss to Austin Aries and Roderick Strong. He returned to ROH in February 2007, losing a six-man mayhem match at Fifth Year Festival: Dayton.

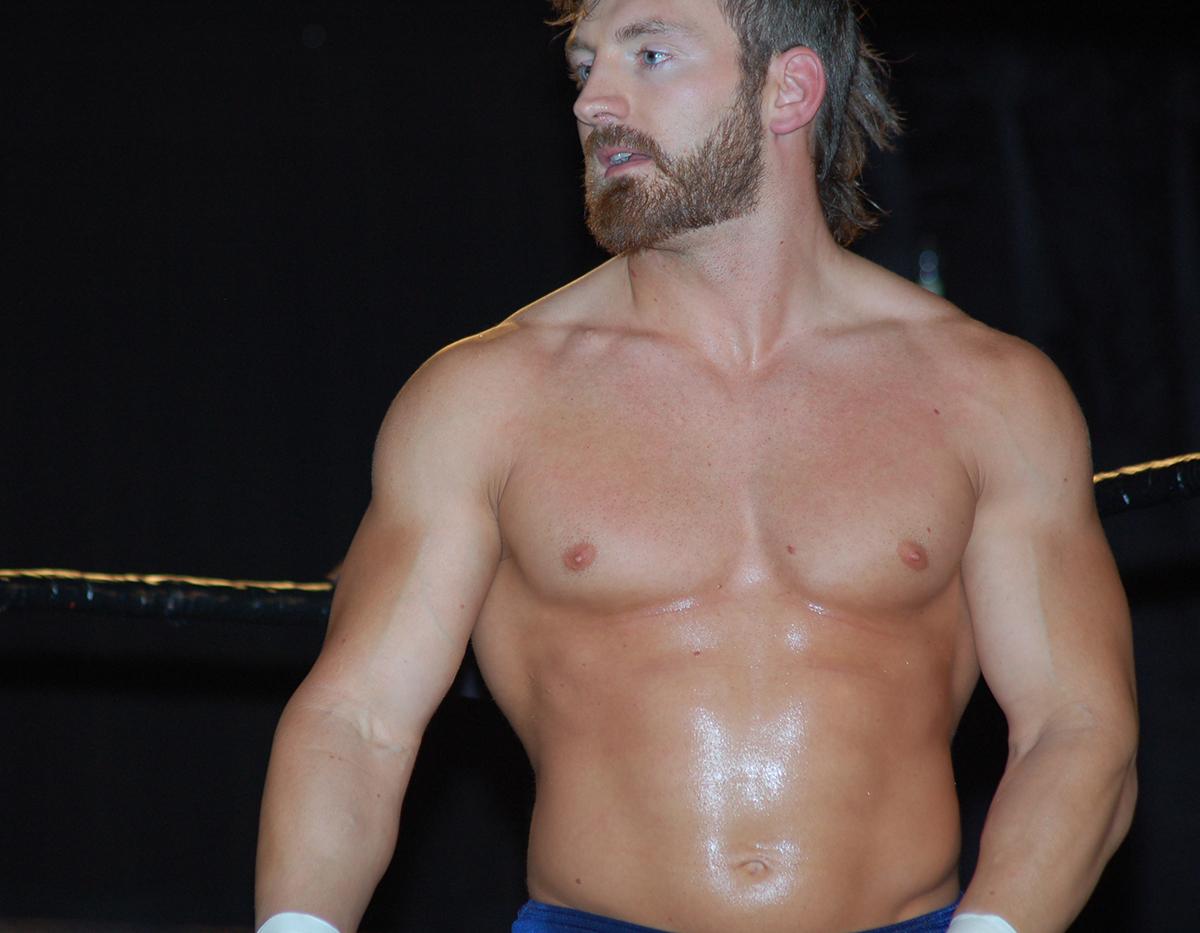
M-Dogg 20 in 2009

The following night at Fifth Year Festival: Chicago however, Cross won his first match in ROH when he was victorious in a four-corner survival match, defeating Shingo, CJ Otis, and Trik Davis. Following the match, Cross was approached by Austin Aries, who asked Cross to team with him later night against the No Remorse Corps (NRC) to which Cross agreed. The pair were then attacked by NRC members Roderick Strong and Davey Richards. Cross and Aries won the tag team encounter, but during the match Cross performed a springboard plancha outside the ring, landing on the guardrail and sustaining several cuts. The team of Aries and Cross were later joined by Erick Stevens, with the three being named The Resilience. At This Means War II in April, The Resilience lost a six-man elimination match to the NRC (Strong, Richards, and Rocky Romero). At Reborn Again in May, Cross and Stevens teamed with Bryan Danielson in a loss to the NRC in a six-man tag team match. In June, Cross, Stevens, and Delirious defeated the NRC in a six-man tag team match, before Cross lost the Richards in a singles match the following night at Domination. Cross appeared at the Driven pay-per-view on June 22, when he, Stevens, and Delirious lost to the NRC. At Death Before Dishonor V: Night 2 in August, The Resilience and Delirious lost a Philadelphia Street Fight to the NRC and Matt Sydal. The Resilience went on to defeat Richards, Jason Blade, and Eddie Edwards, before Cross and Stevens defeated Mike Quackenbush and Jigsaw at Manhattan Mayhem II. At Motor City Madness 2007 on September 14, Cross and Aries unsuccessfully challenged the Briscoe Brothers (Jay and Mark) for the ROH World Tag Team Championship. At the Man Up pay-per-view taping the following night, Cross lost to NRC member Romero in a singles match. The next month, at the taping of Undeniable, Cross and Stevens lost a tag team match to Romero and Richards. The match carried the stipulation that whoever was pinned would be suspended, and because Cross was pinned, he was suspended from ROH for two months.

Cross returned at Rising Above on December 29, where he competed in a four-way match won by the Necro Butcher. The following night at Final Battle, Cross and Bobby Fish lost to Ruckus and Jigsaw in a tag team match. At Breakout on January 25, 2008, Cross and Jigsaw lost to the Briscoe Brothers. The next Cross appeared in ROH was at Steel City Clash on March 20, 2009, when he teamed with Stevens in a loss to Rhett Titus and Kenny King. At A Cut Above the following month, he made his final appearance in ROH as he competed in a four-corner survival match, which was won by Claudio Castagnoli.

=== Wrestling Society X (2007) ===
In 2007, when MTV launched its new wrestling program Wrestling Society X, Capiccioni was signed to the project under his Matt Cross ring name, and he formed a tag team with Teddy Hart called The Filth and The Fury. As part of the television tapings, The Filth and The Fury defeated The Trailer Park Boyz (Nate Webb and Josh Raymond) and Team Dragon Gate (Yoshino and Horiguchi) before losing to Los Pochos Guapos (Kaos and Aguilera).

=== Foreign excursion (2005–2008) ===
In March 2005, M-Dogg 20 traveled to Ireland, where he wrestled for the Irish Whip Wrestling promotion, competing against Jonny Storm, Jody Fleisch, Darren Burridge, and Red Vinny. In May 2007, Capiccioni returned to Europe when he was booked by the Queens of Chaos promotion in France. He wrestled in front of 72,000 people, which is the 2007 record for a wrestling show. As Matt Cross, he debuted in German Stampede Wrestling in 2007, and was part of a four-way for the Breakthrough Championship against Germany's Thumbtack Jack, Steve Douglas and X-Dream, who eventually won the match. In April 2010, Cross was a surprise guests (along with Chris Hero, Claudio Castagnoli, Douglas Williams and Ares) for GSW's final show. He lost another Breakthrough Championship match in a three-way against Emil Sitoci and X-Dream on Saturday, and then teamed with X-Dream in a GSW Tag Team Championship scramble match on Sunday, but was again unsuccessful. When GSW reopened with a new structure a few months later, Cross received another match for the Breakthrough Championship, and won by defeating Sitoci. He held the championship through the next three television tapings and successfully defended it against Zack Sabre Jr. At the Unstoppable internet pay-per-view, he lost the championship to X-Dream. In 2008, Capiccioni began competing for the Italy-based Nu-Wrestling Evolution as "Spartan 3000 b.C.", a Spartan warrior inspired by the popular movie 300. The same year, Capiccioni wrestled in several matches for Pro Wrestling Noah under a mask as "Raptor".

=== World Wrestling Entertainment / WWE (2010–2011) ===
On July 15, 2010, Capiccioni, under his Matt Cross ring name, wrestled a try-out match alongside Jamin Canseco against The Gatecrashers (Vance Archer and Curt Hawkins) on an episode of Superstars.

In 2011, Capiccioni joined the cast of the revived WWE Tough Enough series, which premiered on April 4. He was eliminated from the competition in the second week.

=== Later independent work (2010-2018) ===
On April 24, 2010, Capiccioni, under his Matt Cross ring name, made his debut for Philadelphia-based Chikara. In his first match, a four-way elimination match in the Rey de Voladores (King of the Fliers) tournament, Cross defeated Flip Kendrick, Malachi Jackson and Amasis to advance to the finals. The following day, Cross was defeated in the finals by Ophidian.

On March 2, 2012, Cross' former tag team partner Josh Prohibition came out of retirement to reform Youthanazia, and together they defeated Aeroform (Flip Kendrick and Louis Lyndon) to win the Absolute Intense Wrestling Tag Team Championship. Youthanazia made their first successful title defense on April 6 by defeating The Irish Airborne. On October 20, 2013, Cross defeated Matthew Justice to win the Prime Television Championship.

Cross debuted for UK promotion Progress Wrestling in May 2016 at their annual Super Strong Style 16 tournament. He lost to Sami Callihan in the first round and later participated in the ten man scramble redemption match on Night 2. At Chapter 38, Cross was victorious over Mark Andrews, gaining the number one contendership for the Smash Wrestling Championship.

On September 1, 2018, Matt Cross wrestled in the opening contest of independent wrestling super-show All In against Maxwell Jacob Friedman.

=== Lucha Underground (2014–2019) ===
In September 2014, it was reported that Capiccioni had signed with the El Rey network's new television series, Lucha Underground. He assumed a masked character by the ring name of Son of Havoc, and wrestled during the first episode of Lucha Underground on October 29, defeating Sexy Star. The following weeks, Havoc was defeated by Mascarita Sagrada and Pimpinela Escarlata, asking for real competition. On January 17, Havoc was defeated by Angélico and by Johnny Mundo. Finally, on January 25, Havoc broke up with Ivelisse and defeated Angélico, his first singles win since his debut. On February 8, 2015, Son of Havoc, Angélico and Ivelisse won a tournament to become the inaugural Lucha Underground Trios Champions. On the May 20 episode of Lucha Underground, Ivelisse, Havoc and Angélico successfully retained their championships in a ladder match against The Crew (Cortez Castro, Mr. Cisco and Bael). They lost the titles to The Disciples of Death on the first night of Ultima Lucha, but managed to regain them in the show's second season before losing them again in the finals of another Trios Tournament.

On June 13, 2018, Lucha Underground Trios champion Dante Fox did not appear, and was pronounced 'Missing in Action', Havoc was named champion in his place, alongside The Mack and Killshot.

=== National Wrestling Alliance (2019–2021) ===
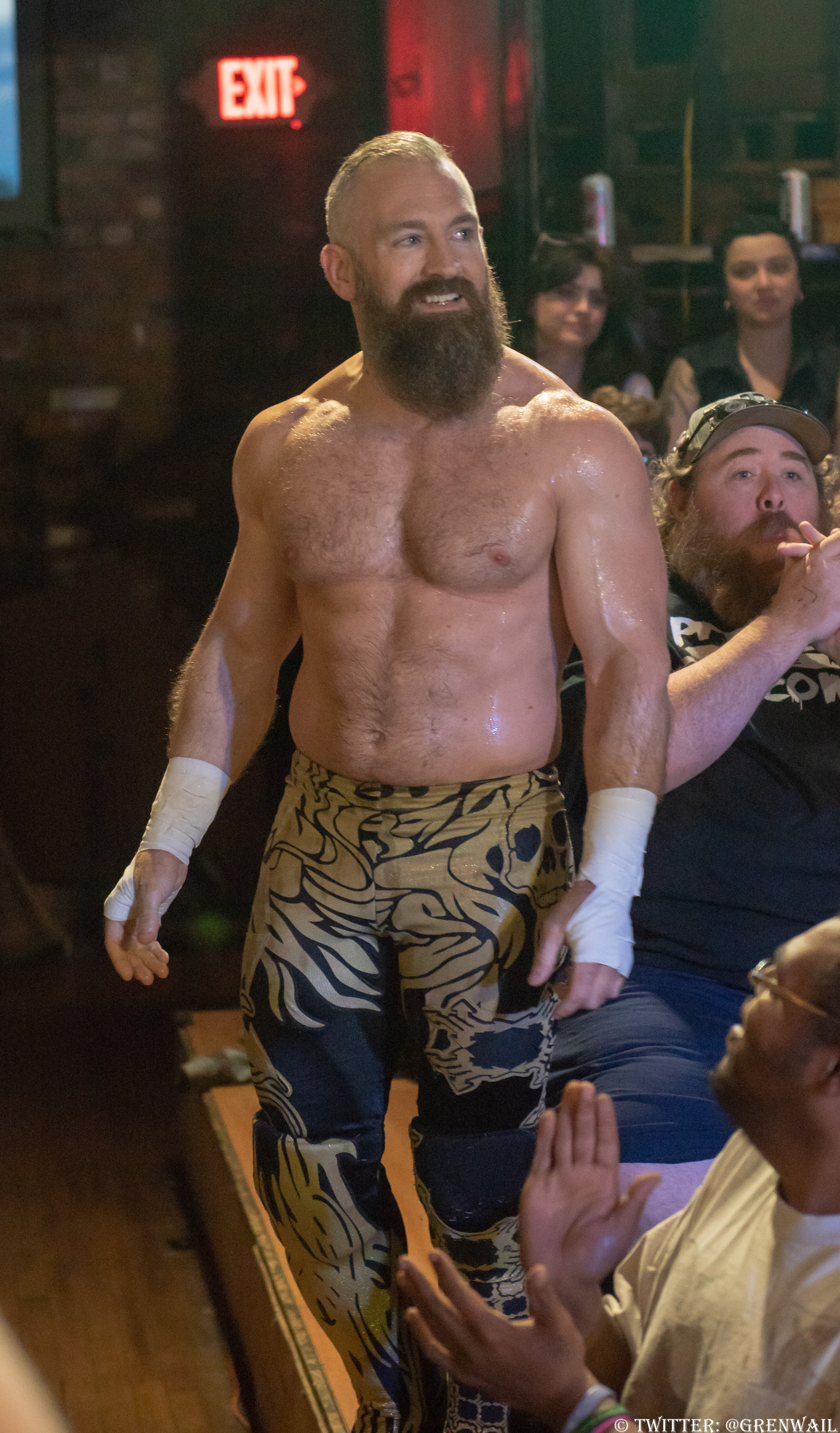
Cross in 2019

Cross appeared at a National Wrestling Alliance event on January 5, 2019. He wrestled Willie Mack at NWA New Years Clash for the NWA National Heavyweight Championship in a losing effort.

Cross returned to the National Wrestling Alliance on January 24, 2020, at their Hard Times PPV, competing in the TV Title tournament.

=== Juggalo Championship Wrestling (2024–present) ===
In 2024, Cross wrestled heavily for Juggalo Championship Wrestling. He wrestled multiple times for the JCW Heavyweight Championship, winning the title on August 16, 2024, at Bloodymania 17 in Thornville, Ohio by defeating Willie Mack. Successful title defenses followed against opponents including James Storm, Kongo Kong and Mecha Wolf, and Simon Gotch, before dropping the title back to Willie Mack in a 3-way match that included Mecha Wolf, on October 30, 2024, at the Devil's Night pay-per-view in Detroit, Michigan.

== Other media ==
Capiccioni was featured on Season 6 of American Ninja Warrior, participating in the St. Louis, Missouri, qualifying round but failed to qualify.

He appeared in Backyard Wrestling: A Passion for Pain (DVD, 2003) which featured early wrestling matches and humorous stunts.

He appeared as a character in the 2003 video game Backyard Wrestling: Don't Try This at Home.

In 2017, Capiccioni started the clothing company Wrestling Is Forever.

In 2020, he starred as a fictionalized version of himself in the Indiegogo crowdfunded wrestling suspense thriller film Powerbomb.

== Personal life ==
Capiccioni's grandfather was from San Marino and he has dual nationality as a result. Capiccioni attended Cleveland State University, where he earned his Bachelor of Arts in communications. He is also straight edge.

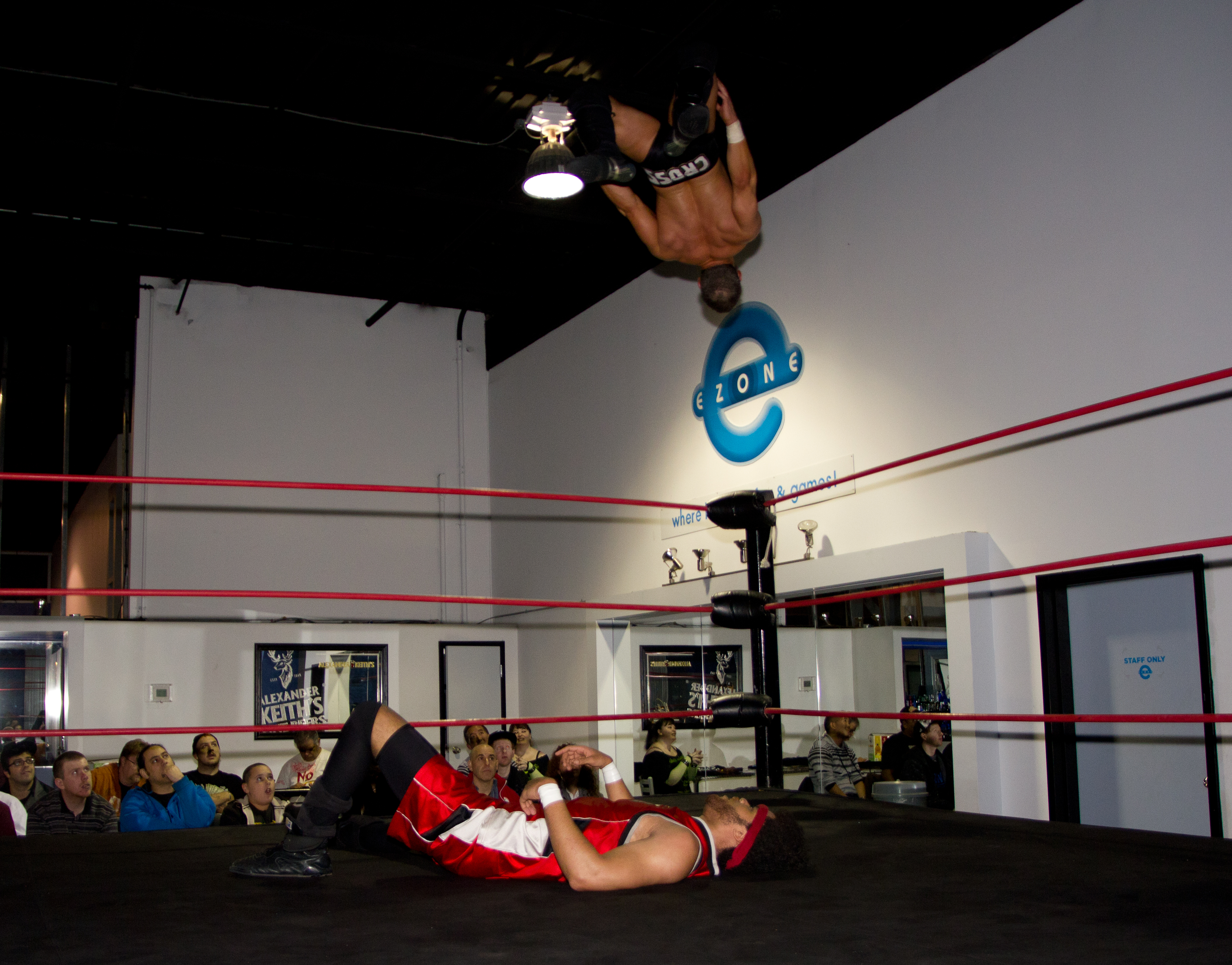
Cross performing a shooting star press.

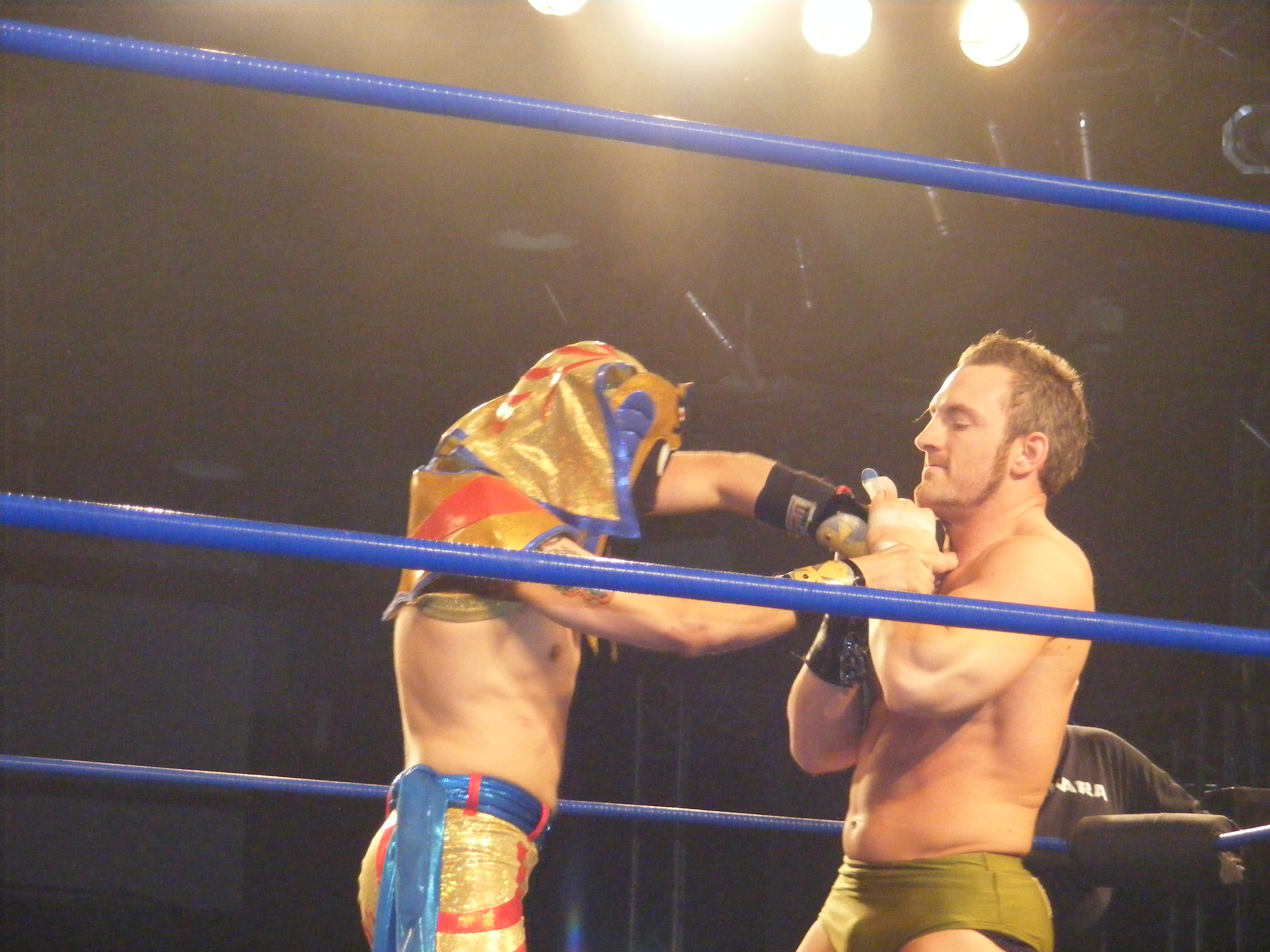
Cross wrestling Ophidian.

== Championships and accomplishments ==
- Cleveland All Pro Wrestling
  - CAPW Junior Heavyweight Championship (1 time)
  - CAPW North American Tag Team Championship (2 times) – with Josh Prohibition
- Continental Wrestling Federation
  - CWF Championship (1 time, final)
- DDT Pro-Wrestling
  - Ironman Heavymetalweight Championship (1 time)
- East Coast Wrestling Association
  - ECWA Super 8 Tournament (2014)
- European Wrestling Promotion
  - CWP Intercontinental Championship (1 time)
  - CWP Tag Team Championships (1 time) – with Chris Colen
- Extreme Ring Action
  - ERA Heavyweight Championship (1 time, inaugural)
  - ERA Heavyweight Championship Tournament (2015)
- Far North Wrestling
  - FNW Cruiserweight Championship (1 time)
- Firestorm Pro Wrestling
  - Firestorm Pro Heavyweight Championship (1 time)
- German Stampede Wrestling
  - GSW Breakthrough Championship (2 times)
- German Wrestling Federation
  - GWF Berlin Championship (1 time)
- HoodMark Lucha Libre
  - HMLL Championship (1 time)
- International Wrestling Australia
  - IWA Heavyweight Championship (1 time)
- Independent Wrestling Association Mid-South
  - IWA Mid-South Heavyweight Championship (1 time)
- International Wrestling Cartel
  - IWC Tag Team Championship (2 times) – with Josh Prohibition
- Juggalo Championship Wrestling
  - JCW Heavyweight Championship (1 time)
- Lucha Libre AAA Worldwide
  - Best High-flyer award (2017)
- Lucha Underground
  - Lucha Underground Trios Championship (3 times) – with Angélico and Ivelisse (2) and Killshot and Willie Mack (1)
  - Unique Opportunity Tournament (2016)
- Mid-Ohio Wrestling
  - MOW Cruiserweight Championship (1 time)
- Mondo Lucha
  - Mondo Lucha Championship (1 time, current)
  - Mondo Lucha Tag Team Championship (1 time) – with Johnny Mundo
- NWA Upstate
  - NWA Upstate Tag Team Championship (1 time) – with Josh Prohibition
  - Upstate 8 Tag Team Tournament (2005) – with Josh Prohibition
- New Era Pro Wrestling
  - NEPW Cruiserweight Championship (1 time)
  - NEPW Tag Team Championship (1 time) – with Josh Prohibition
- Next Generation Wrestling
  - NGW Championship (3 times)
- Ohio Hatchet Wrestling
  - OHW Heavyweight championship (1 time, current)
- Olde Wrestling
  - Olde Wrestling World Championship (1 time, current, inaugural)
  - Olde Wrestling World Title Tournament (2013)
- Pro Wrestling Illustrated
  - PWI ranked him #88 of the top 500 singles wrestlers in the PWI 500 in 2014
- Pro Wrestling Ohio/Prime Wrestling
  - PWO Heavyweight Championship (2 times)
  - Prime Television Championship (1 time)
- Qatar Pro Wrestling
  - QPW King of the Ladder Match Championship (1 time)
- Rings of Europe
  - Wachauer Wrestling Trophy (2007)
- Smash Wrestling
  - Smash Wrestling Championship (1 time, inaugural)
  - Smash Wrestling Title Tournament (2014)
- Support All Pro Wrestling
  - SAPW Heavyweight Championship (1 time, current)
- Swiss Wrestling Entertainment
  - SWE King of Switzerland Championship (1 time)
- Top Tier Wrestling
  - TPW Heavyweight Championship (1 time)
- Union of Independent Professional Wrestlers
  - UNION Heavyweight Championship (1 time)
- UWA Hardcore Wrestling
  - UWA Canadian Heavyweight Championship (2 times)
- Xcite Wrestling
  - Xcite Wrestling Heavyweight Championship (1 time)
- Wrestling Pro Essonne
  - WPE Heavyweight Championship (1 time, final)
- Xtreme Pro Wrestling
  - XPW World Tag Team Championship (2 times) – with Josh Prohibition
- Other Titles
  - HKW Championship (1 time, current)

== Luchas de Apuestas record ==
Winner (wager)	Loser (wager)	Location	Event	Date	Notes
Son of Havoc (mask)	Killshot (mask)		Ultima Lucha Cuatro		Aired on October 31, 2018
