= Jay Briscoe =

American professional wrestler (1984–2023)

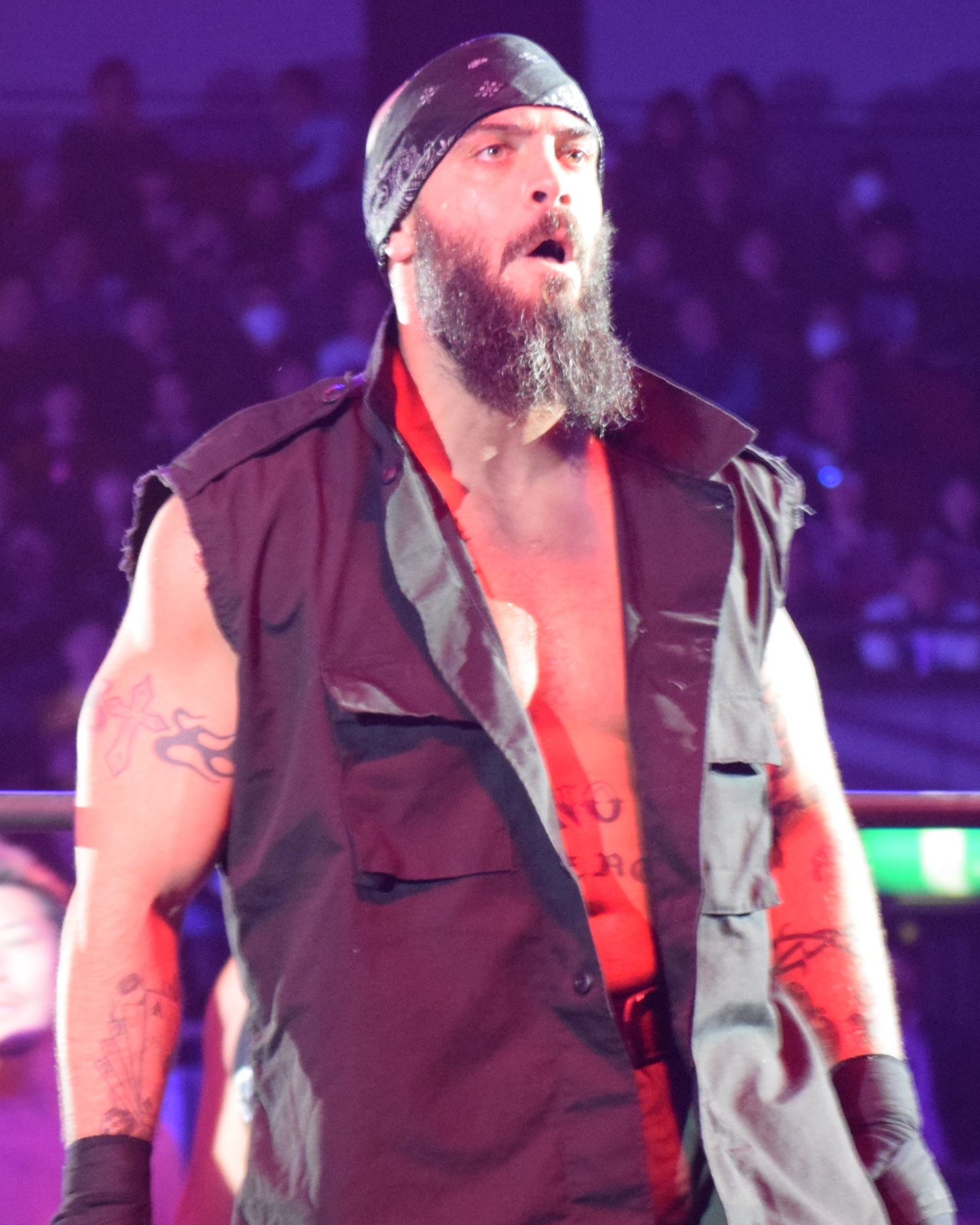
- Briscoe in 2016

Personal information
- Born: Jamin Dale Pugh; January 25, 1984 Salisbury, Maryland, U.S.
- Died: January 17, 2023 (aged 38) Laurel, Delaware, U.S.
- Spouse: Ashley Pugh (m. 2008)
- Children: 3
- Family: Mark Briscoe (brother)

Professional wrestling career
- Ring names: Jay Briscoe; Kenny Murdoch
- Billed height: 6 ft 1 in (185 cm)
- Billed weight: 231 lb (105 kg)
- Billed from: Sandy Fork, Delaware
- Trained by: Eddie Valentine; Glen Osbourne; Jim Kettner
- Debut: May 20, 2000

Jamin Dale Pugh (January 25, 1984 – January 17, 2023), known by his ring name Jay Briscoe, was an American professional wrestler. He was known for his time with his brother Mark Briscoe as the Briscoe Brothers in Ring of Honor, where he was a two-time ROH World Champion, ROH World Six-Man Tag Team Champion, and record 13-time ROH World Tag Team Champion. Other championships held by Briscoe over his career include the Impact World Tag Team Championship and IWGP Tag Team Championship. He was inducted into the ROH Hall of Fame in 2022.

== Professional wrestling career ==
=== Early career (2000–2001) ===
Jay Briscoe was trained to wrestle by Eddie Valentine, Glen Osbourne, and Jim Kettner. He debuted on May 20, 2000, at the age of 16. Throughout 2000, he and his brother Mark wrestled a handful of tag team matches for the Delaware-based East Coast Wrestling Association. In January 2001, they appeared with Maryland Championship Wrestling.

=== Combat Zone Wrestling (2001–2003, 2010–2012) ===
The Briscoe Brothers made their debuts for Combat Zone Wrestling (CZW) at Delaware Invasion on January 20, 2001, being brought in to job, teaming with independent wrestler Eddie Valentine, as part of a three-on-one handicap match against Trent Acid. At the inaugural Best of the Best event, a show somewhat atypical of CZW in that it is a tournament spotlighting athletic junior heavyweight wrestling as opposed to violent hardcore matches, the two advanced past the first round in a three-way match with Nick Mondo where the stipulation was whoever took the fall would be eliminated. They were then matched against each other in the second round, with Jay winning and advancing further. This match was seen by fans as the best of the tournament, and seen in retrospect as having been responsible in large part for helping launch the brothers' careers, as they were new to the independent circuit and very young at the time.

After losing in title opportunities at Breakaway Brawl and A New Beginning, the brothers won the CZW Tag Team Championship on July 14, 2001, as they defeated the original H8 Club at H8 Club: Dead?. They lost it, however, in their first defense, to Johnny Kashmere and Justice Pain on July 28, 2001, at What About Lobo? Mark wasn't used for several months after that, but Jay continued on as a singles wrestler in that time, even facing Justice Pain for the CZW Heavyweight Championship at September Slam on September 8, which he lost.

At the end of 2001 and into 2002, CZW's territory (that is, the area at which they held the majority of their events) was shifting from Sewell, New Jersey, to Philadelphia, Pennsylvania, in order to hold events regularly at the old ECW arena, beginning with December 15's Cage of Death 3. At this event, they faced Nick Gage and Nate Hatred, but wore masks and were identified as The Midnight Outlaws. This was likely to get around the fact that Jay was only 17 and Mark only 16 at the time; this meant, as they were under 18 years of age, that they could not legally work in a sport wrestling exhibition in the state of Pennsylvania. As CZW regularly began holding shows in the Philadelphia area, the Midnight Outlaws made appearances at the next four CZW events. At A Higher Level of Pain on April 13, 2002, Jay appeared across the ring from the Midnight Outlaws, tagging with Ruckus against Mark and someone else. By this time, he had turned 18. Jay and Ruckus won the match, and this was the last time either Jay or Mark appeared for CZW until April 12, 2003, where Jay and Mark both returned for Best of the Best 3. Jay was a surprise entrant after being taunted by A.J. Styles, and Mark filling in for the injured Ruckus. Jay advanced to the semi-finals, where he lost to B-Boy, and Mark lost his fill-in match to Sonjay Dutt. The two faced off with the Backseat Boyz for the CZW World Tag Team Championship at Truth or Consequences on June 14, but failed to win the belts.

On December 11, 2010, at Cage of Death XII, the Briscoe Brothers Returned to CZW challenging newly crowned CZW World Tag Team Champions Philly's Most Wanted of Blk Jeez and Joker to a title match in January. On January 7, 2011, at "From Small Beginnings Come Great Things" Philly's Most Wanted retained the CZW World Tag Team Championships against the Briscoe Brothers in a no contest. The Briscoe Brothers then challenged Philly's Most Wanted to a no disqualification rematch. On February 12, 2011, at "Twelve: The Twelfth Anniversary Event" The Briscoe Brothers defeated Philly's Most Wanted to become the new CZW World Tag Team Champions. They lost the title back to Philly's Most Wanted on May 14, 2011. The Briscoe Brothers returned to CZW again on November 10, 2012, facing Dave and Jake Crist in a losing effort.

=== Jersey All Pro Wrestling (2001, 2002, 2005, 2006, 2008) ===
Jay Briscoe made his Jersey All Pro Wrestling (JAPW) debut on March 24, 2001, at March Madness Night 2, losing to Insane Dragon and Dixie teaming with his brother Mark Briscoe. It is unclear how, if at all, JAPW's ownership and management worked around Pennsylvania's child labor law, as both brothers were underage at the time of this and two subsequent appearances in the old ECW arena. They made three other appearances in JAPW in 2001, and unsuccessful challenge for Dragon and Dixie's JAPW Tag Team Championship on June 15 at Here to Stay.

Jay Briscoe made his return to JAPW in 2002. On July 13, 2002, at Unfinished Business, Jay Briscoe and Insane Dragon won the JAPW Tag Team Championship after scoring simultaneous pinfalls on the members of Da Hit Squad. The six men went on to meet in a rematch of sorts at the next event, Royal Consequences 2 on August 10, 2002, Jay and Insane Dragon defended the titles against Da Hit Squad and the team of Mark Briscoe and Deranged in a tables, ladders, and chairs match, which Da Hit Squad won. Two shows later, on September 20 at Family Crisis 2, Da Hit Squad retained the title over the Briscoe Brothers in a regular match.

The Briscoe Brothers did not appear for JAPW again until late 2005, again in a tables, ladders, and chairs match for the tag team title, this time against the teams of Teddy Hart and Homicide, the Backseat Boyz, and The S.A.T. The match, which took place at JAPW's 8th Year Anniversary Show, was won Hart and Homicide. At the next show, Fall Out, the S.A.T. defeated them and thus became number one contenders to the tag team championship. More recent JAPW appearances came in early 2006, losing along with the Outcast Killers to the S.A.T. once again at Wild Card II in a tag team title match, and then at Brotherly Love to the team of Sabu and Sonjay Dutt, a match they also lost. In October 2008, the Briscoe Brothers competed at JAPW's 11th Anniversary Show against LAX (Homicide and Hernandez). During a brawl outside the ring, Mark suffered a large gash on the side of his head.

=== Ring of Honor (2002–2023) ===
==== Early appearances (2002–2004) ====
In February 2002, Briscoe wrestled on Ring of Honor's first-ever show, The Era of Honor Begins, losing to Amazing Red. Mark seconded him to the ring but could not wrestle because of Pennsylvania's child labor law (most of ROH's earliest shows took place in Philadelphia). Jay wrestled each of ROH's next four shows, against Spanky, Tony Mamaluke, Doug Williams, and James Maritato, losing to all but Mamaluke. At Honor Invades Boston, when Mark was able to perform, he defeated his brother, in the second-to-last match of the night. The Brothers went on briefly to feud against each other, during which time Jay scored a non-title win over ROH Champion Xavier at Glory By Honor. This earned him a title shot at All-Star Extravaganza, where he lost. At Scramble Madness, back in Boston, the brothers' storyline involved them picking their own partners for a tag team match. Jay picked past foe Amazing Red, whereas Mark's partner was Christopher Daniels, as he seemingly joined The Prophecy. Daniels pinned Red to win the match. The Brothers' feud against one another concluded at the First Anniversary Show, when Jay defeated Mark in a match, and the two hugged afterward to signify their reunion. Mark never explicitly left the Prophecy, but in forming a team with his brother, he stopped teaming with them.

Newly united as a team in ROH, the Briscoe Brothers began, in 2003, to feud with AJ Styles and Amazing Red, then holders of the ROH Tag Team Championship, losing in title matches at Night of Champions, The Epic Encounter, and Death Before Dishonor, which by stipulation was their last match for the title for as long as Styles and Red held it. Before the last match, a poll was held on ROH's website, asking the fans if they wanted to see a third match between the two teams. Over 80% of respondents voted 'yes'. At Beating the Odds, they returned from a brief absence to score a pair of wins which were depicted in the storyline as being improbable, Mark over ROH veteran B. J. Whitmer and Jay in a Four Corner Survival match with ROH World Champion Samoa Joe, NWA World Heavyweight Champion AJ Styles, and Chris Sabin, pinning Sabin to earn a future title shot at Joe. At ROH's Maryland debut, Tradition Continues, Joe retained over Jay.

The Brothers took part in the gauntlet match at Glory By Honor 2, which was held to fill the tag team championship left vacant by Red suffering a serious knee injury. They defeated and eliminated the Special K team of Hydro and Angeldust as well as the Ring Crew Express, before being eliminated by the other Special K team in the match, Izzy and Dixie, due to outside interference from Angeldust. After Izzy and Dixie later won the tag team title, the Brothers were granted a shot at it, at Main Event Spectacles. The reason given in the storyline was they were given the shot since they only lost in the gauntlet match because Special K cheated. In the opening segment of that event, they were aligned with Jim Cornette, because, in the storyline, Cornette wanted to create new champions. They attacked his former client, Samoa Joe, who Cornette abandoned since he already was a champion. They went on to win the belts later in the show. At The Conclusion, The Battle Lines Are Drawn, and The Last Stand, which was by stipulation Joe's last shot at the tag team title for as long as the Briscoe Brothers held it, they retained the belts over Joe and a different partner each time: AJ Styles, Bryan Danielson, and Jerry Lynn, respectively. Since Joe took pinfalls at The Conclusion (to Mark) and The Last Stand (to Jay), both brothers subsequently earned shots at his world title. Both failed, with Mark losing at Final Battle 2003 and Jay being defeated at At Our Best in a memorable and bloody steel cage match.

They dropped the tag team title to the Second City Saints (CM Punk and Colt Cabana) at ROH's Chicago-area debut, ROH Reborn: Stage Two, working in ROH for the first time as outward heels. At the next show, Round Robin Challenge III, the title switched three times among the teams in the round robin challenge: the Second City Saints, the Briscoe Brothers, and the Prophecy team of Dan Maff and B. J. Whitmer. The Briscoe Brothers defeated Maff and Whitmer in the fourth match of the night to win the title for a second time, and then lost it back to Punk and Cabana in the main event. The Brothers both participated in ROH's inaugural Survival of the Fittest tournament, with Mark going over Alex Shelley in his qualifier and Jay falling to Homicide. Mark did not, however, win the elimination final. After losing a two out of three falls tag team title match to Punk and Cabana at Death Before Dishonor II Part 1, ending that feud, they lost in separate singles matches to members of the Rottweilers the next night. Between that and their victory in tag team action at Testing the Limit, it is likely that a feud was planned between the Briscoe Brothers and the Rottweilers.

==== Return; Tag Team Champion (2006–2013) ====
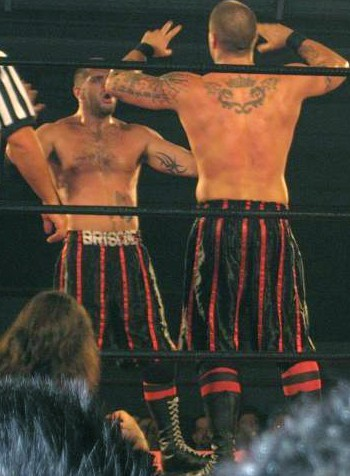
Jay Briscoe (right) and Mark Briscoe at a Ring of Honor event in 2006.

The Briscoe Brothers returned to ROH at the Fourth Anniversary Show in February 2006, forcibly including themselves in a match that was at first between the teams of Tony Mamaluke, Sal Rinauro, Jason Blade and Kid Mikaze. They won in their re-debut. They then feuded for the tag team championship again, but much as they had against Styles and Red three years earlier, they lost in three shots against the champions at the time, Austin Aries and Roderick Strong, at Ring of Homicide, Destiny, and Unified. As before, the storyline was that this cost them any chance at the belts for as long as those champs held them. It was around this time that the Brothers became enforcers for Jim Cornette's heel character as ROH Commissioner, fighting battles against his enemies, most notably Homicide and his partner Samoa Joe at Glory By Honor V: Night Two and in anything goes, falls count anywhere, elimination match at Dethroned. During this time, they also feuded with Kenta and his partners Davey Richards and Naomichi Marufuji, facing Kenta and Richards at Time to Man Up and Kenta and Marufuji at Glory By Honor V: Night One.

At Fifth Year Festival: Chicago in February 2007, the Briscoe Brothers defeated Christopher Daniels and Matt Sydal to win the tag team championship. Their reign, however, proved to be brief, as they in turn dropped the belts to Naruki Doi and Shingo Takagi in their first defense, at Fifth Year Festival: Liverpool. After this match, the storyline was that the brothers felt they needed to "man up" due to losing the title in their first defense, just as they had the GHC Junior Heavyweight Tag Team Championship earlier in the year. Thus, the two faced off what was described as "one time only" at Fifth Year Festival: Finale. The match ended in a draw, with both of them unable to answer the referee's standing ten-count. At the next event, All Star Extravaganza III, they won the title back from Doi and Shingo, but in the course of the match Mark was seriously injured attempting a Shooting Star Press to the floor. Mark was kept in the intensive care unit of a hospital for two nights, and suffered a seizure there before eventually being released. Two weeks later, at Fighting Spirit, Mark made an unadvertised and unannounced return, entering through the crowd to come to his brother's side during his match with Erick Stevens against Kevin Steen and El Generico. The storyline was that with Mark out and injured, Jay was tagging with Stevens as a replacement. The No Remorse Corps then ran in and attacked Stevens, and Jay was momentarily left without a partner until Mark entered. Mark eventually suffered the fall in the match after several bumps to the head. They then began to feud with Steen and Generico. After retaining the tag title over Claudio Castagnoli and Matt Sydal at ROH's first pay-per-view Respect is Earned, Steen and Generico showed up and immediately demanded their title shot; the scene followed with a wild brawl all over the building. The feud was followed on both ROH's standard canon, with Steen defeating Mark at A Fight at the Roxbury, and the PPV series, with the Brothers retaining the tag team title against Steen and Generico at Driven, after which Steen repeatedly attacked both brothers with a ladder. The Briscoe Brothers then retained over Steen and Generico in a steel cage match at Caged Rage and in ROH's first-ever ladder match at Man Up in September 2007.

After the ladder match, Jimmy Jacobs and the other members of The Age of the Fall attacked the Brothers and hanged Jay upside-down from the apparatus which held up the belts. It was announced that this would not be included in the footage shown on PPV, although it was soon after shown on ROH's video wire and was included with the DVD of the event. After Mark was again injured in a motorcycle accident, though considerably less serious, Jay was alone in a match held at the taping for ROH's fourth PPV, Undeniable, in October 2007. This was an "anything goes" match loss against Necro Butcher of the Age of the Fall. On November 30, the Briscoe Brothers had a match which was taped to be included in Undeniable, a tag team title defense against Davey Richards and Rocky Romero, which they won. At Final Battle in December 2007, the Briscoe Brothers lost the ROH World Tag Team Championship to Jimmy Jacobs and Tyler Black of The Age of the Fall, but won it back on April 12, 2008, at Injustice, defeating Richards and Romero, who had since won the championship from Jacobs and Black. On April 20, ROH's official website reported that Mark had sustained a wrist injury due to Jacobs stabbing him with his trademark rail spike and stood to miss up to six months. The next day, the company announced that Jay and a partner of his choosing would continue to be recognized as the tag team champions. This partner was later revealed to be Austin Aries. After their successful defense against Jacobs & Black on May 10, 2008, at A New Level, the championship was declared vacant.

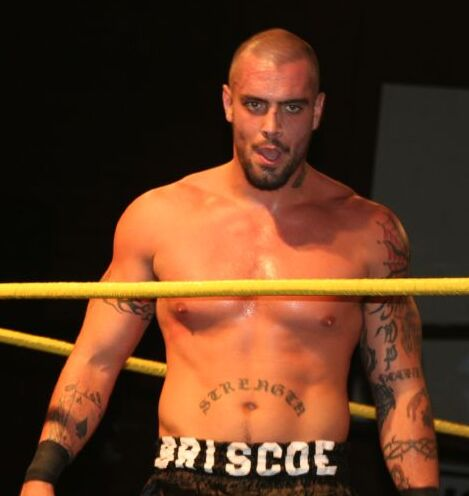
Briscoe in September 2008.

Mark returned to active competition at Northern Navigation on July 25, 2009, teaming with Jay and Aries to defeat The Age of the Fall in a no disqualification match. On December 19, 2009, at Final Battle 2009, the Briscoe Brothers won the ROH World Tag Team Championship for a record sixth time by defeating the American Wolves (Davey Richards and Eddie Edwards). They went on to lose the championship to The Kings of Wrestling (Chris Hero and Claudio Castagnoli) at The Big Bang! pay-per-view on April 3. On August 23, 2010, Ring of Honor announced that the company had signed the Briscoe Brothers to contract extensions. The Briscoe Brothers ended their feud with the Kings of Wrestling on December 18, 2010, at Final Battle 2010, where they teamed with their father Mike "Papa" Briscoe in a six-man tag team match, where they defeated Hero, Castagnoli and their manager Shane Hagadorn. On January 25, 2011, Ring of Honor announced that the Briscoe Brothers had signed new contract extensions with the promotion. On March 19 at Manhattan Mayhem IV, the Briscoe Brothers turned heel after suffering an upset loss against the All Night Xpress (Kenny King and Rhett Titus). On September 17 at Death Before Dishonor IX, the All Night Xpress defeated the Briscoe Brothers in a ladder match to become the number one contenders to the ROH World Tag Team Championship. At Final Battle 2011 on December 23, 2011, the Briscoe Brothers defeated Wrestling's Greatest Tag Team (Charlie Haas and Shelton Benjamin) to win the ROH World Tag Team Championship for the seventh time, turning back to faces in the process. On May 12, 2012, at Border Wars, the Briscoe Brothers lost the title back to Haas and Benjamin. On December 16 at Final Battle 2012: Doomsday, the Briscoe Brothers defeated S.C.U.M. (Jimmy Jacobs and Steve Corino) and Caprice Coleman and Cedric Alexander in a three-way match to win the ROH World Tag Team Championship for the eighth time. They lost the title to Bobby Fish and Kyle O'Reilly on March 2, 2013, at the 11th Anniversary Show.

==== World Champion (2013–2016) ====
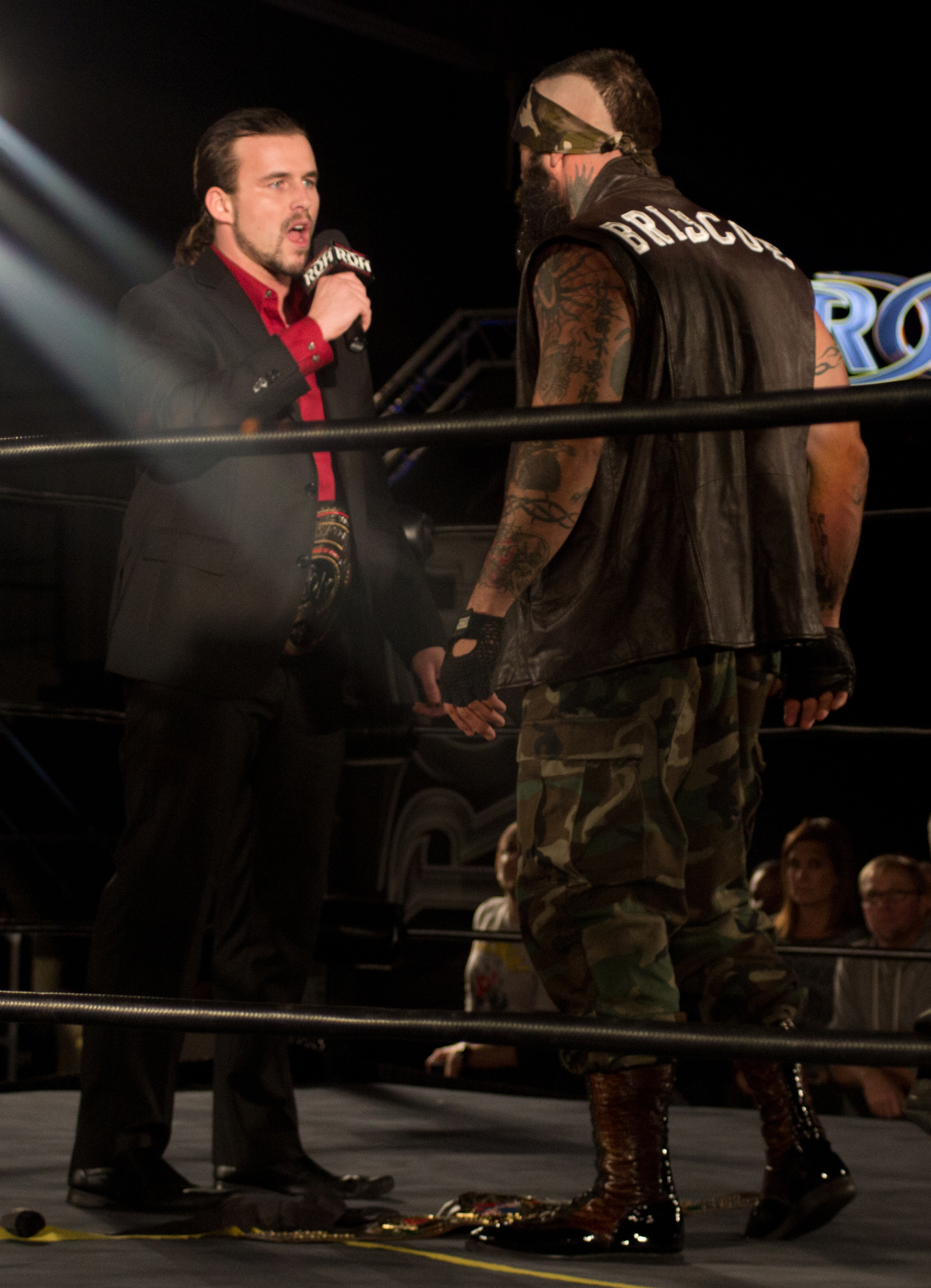
Briscoe (right) confronting Adam Cole over which one is the real ROH World Champion in January 2014.

On April 5, 2013, at Supercard of Honor VII, Jay Briscoe defeated Kevin Steen to become the ROH World Champion. Briscoe made his first successful title defense on May 4, 2013, at Border Wars 2013 against Adam Cole. On June 22 at Best in the World 2013, Jay successfully defended the ROH World Championship against his brother Mark Briscoe. The following day, Briscoe made another successful title defense against Matt Hardy. During the weekend ROH shot injury angles with both Briscoe Brothers. On June 25, 2013, it was reported that Jay Briscoe's contracts with ROH had expired and would not be renewed. On July 3, Ring of Honor stripped Briscoe of the ROH World Championship while also noting that Jay was slated to be out of action for three to six months.

Jay Briscoe returned to ROH in September 2013 at Death Before Dishonor XI to hand the ROH World Championship to the winner of the tournament, Adam Cole, who proceeded to attack him afterwards. On October 26 at Glory By Honor XII, Briscoe entered a storyline, where he introduced his own ROH World Championship belt titled the "Real World Title", claiming that he was the true champion since he had never been defeated for the title. Jay received his shot at the ROH World Championship on December 14 at Final Battle 2013, but was defeated by Cole in a three-way match, which also included Michael Elgin. On February 8, 2014, Jay defeated Cole to retain his version of the ROH World Championship. The two world titles were unified in a ladder match on April 4 at Supercard of Honor VIII, where Cole was victorious, following outside interference from Matt Hardy and Michael Bennett. On May 17, the Briscoe Brothers took part in the ROH/New Japan Pro-Wrestling co-produced War of the Worlds iPPV, where they unsuccessfully challenged Bullet Club (Doc Gallows and Karl Anderson) for the IWGP Tag Team Championship.

On September 6, 2014, at All Star Extravaganza 6, Jay Briscoe defeated Michael Elgin to win the ROH World Championship, becoming only the second two-time ROH World Champion. On December 7, at Final Battle 2014, Briscoe retained the ROH World title after defeating Adam Cole in a Fight Without Honor, which would end their year-long feud. On March 1, 2015, at the ROH 13th Anniversary Show, Briscoe retained the ROH World Championship defeating Tommaso Ciampa, Michael Elgin and Hanson in a four corner survival match. On March 27, 2015, at Supercard of Honor IX, Jay Briscoe defeated Samoa Joe in Joe's return match to Ring of Honor retaining the ROH World Championship. Briscoe would go on to defend the ROH World Championship against Jay Lethal at Best in the World in June 2015 but was defeated, ending his championship reign at nine months.

At Best in the World '16 in June 2016, Jay failed to regain the ROH World title against Jay Lethal; the two shook hands afterwards.

==== Continued tag team success (2016–2023) ====
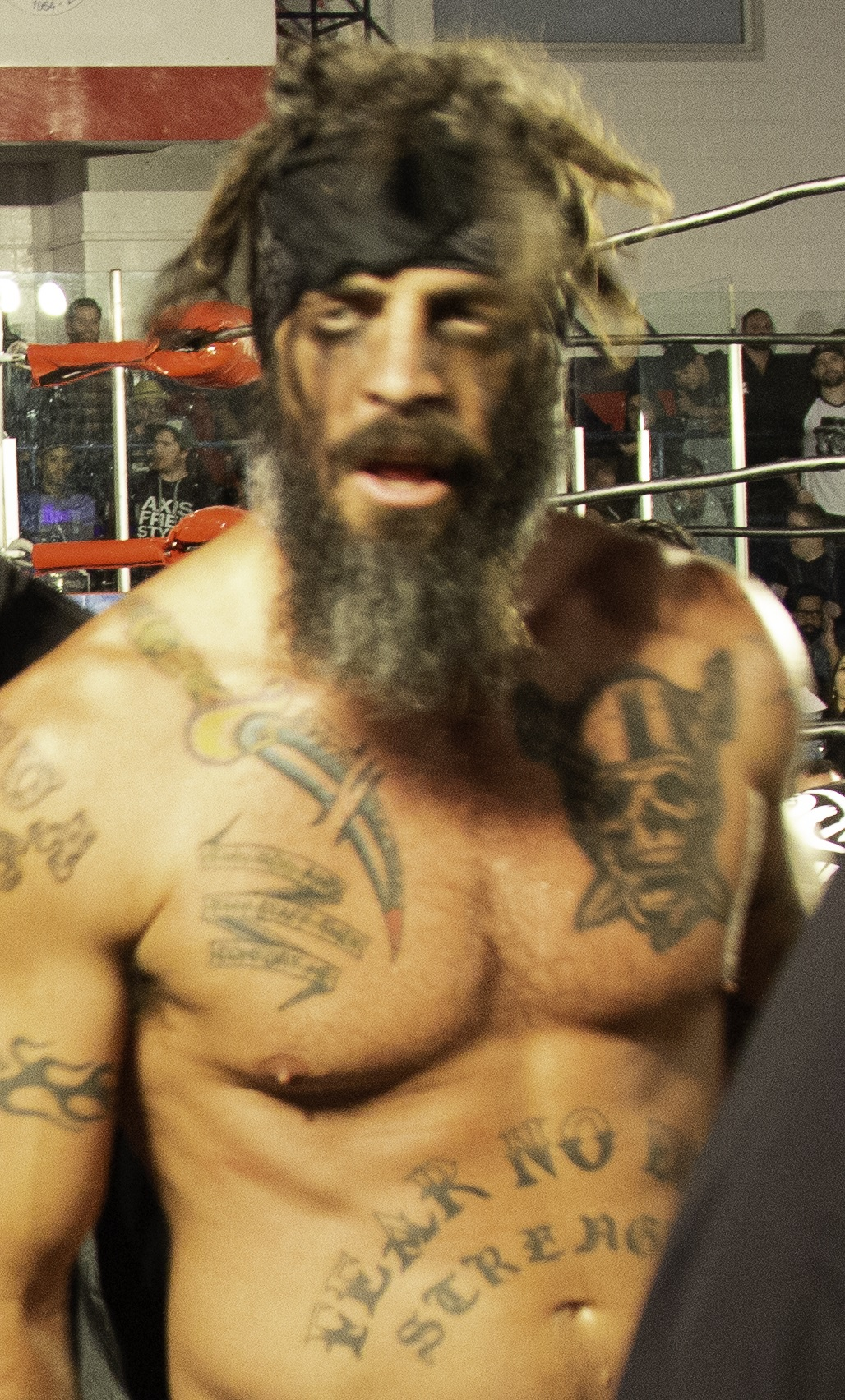
Briscoe in May 2018.

At Field of Honor in August 2016, the Briscoe Brothers took part in gauntlet match for the ROH World Tag Team Championship that was won by the Addiction. At All Star Extravaganza VIII in September 2016, the Briscoe Brothers teamed with Toru Yano in a loss to A. C. H., Jay White, and Kushida in the first round of a tournament for the ROH World Six-Man Tag Team Championship. At Final Battle in December 2016, the Briscoe Brothers unsuccessfully challenged the Young Bucks for the ROH World Tag Team Championship.

In January 2017, Briscoe defeated B. J. Whitmer in the first round of the "Decade of Excellence" tournament and Jay Lethal in the second round before losing to Christopher Daniels in the finals.

In March 2017, the Briscoe Brothers and Bully Ray defeated The Kingdom to win the ROH World Six-Man Tag Team Championship. They lost the titles to Dalton Castle and the Boys in June 2017 at Best in the World. In September 2017 at Death Before Dishonor XV, Briscoe turned on Bully Ray, costing himself, Mark and Ray their match against Hangman Page and the Young Bucks for the ROH World Six-Man Tag Team Championship. In October 2017, Mark also turned on Bully Ray.

In March 2018 at ROH 16th Anniversary Show, the Briscoe Brothers defeated the Motor City Machine Guns to win the ROH World Tag Team Championship for the ninth time. They lost the titles to SoCal Uncensored in October 2018.

In March 2022, both Briscoe Brothers were inducted into the ROH Hall of Fame.

In December 2022, at Final Battle, the Briscoe Brothers defeated FTR in a dog collar match to become 13-time ROH World Tag Team Champions. This was Briscoe's last match in ROH before his death.

=== New Japan Pro-Wrestling (2016–2019) ===
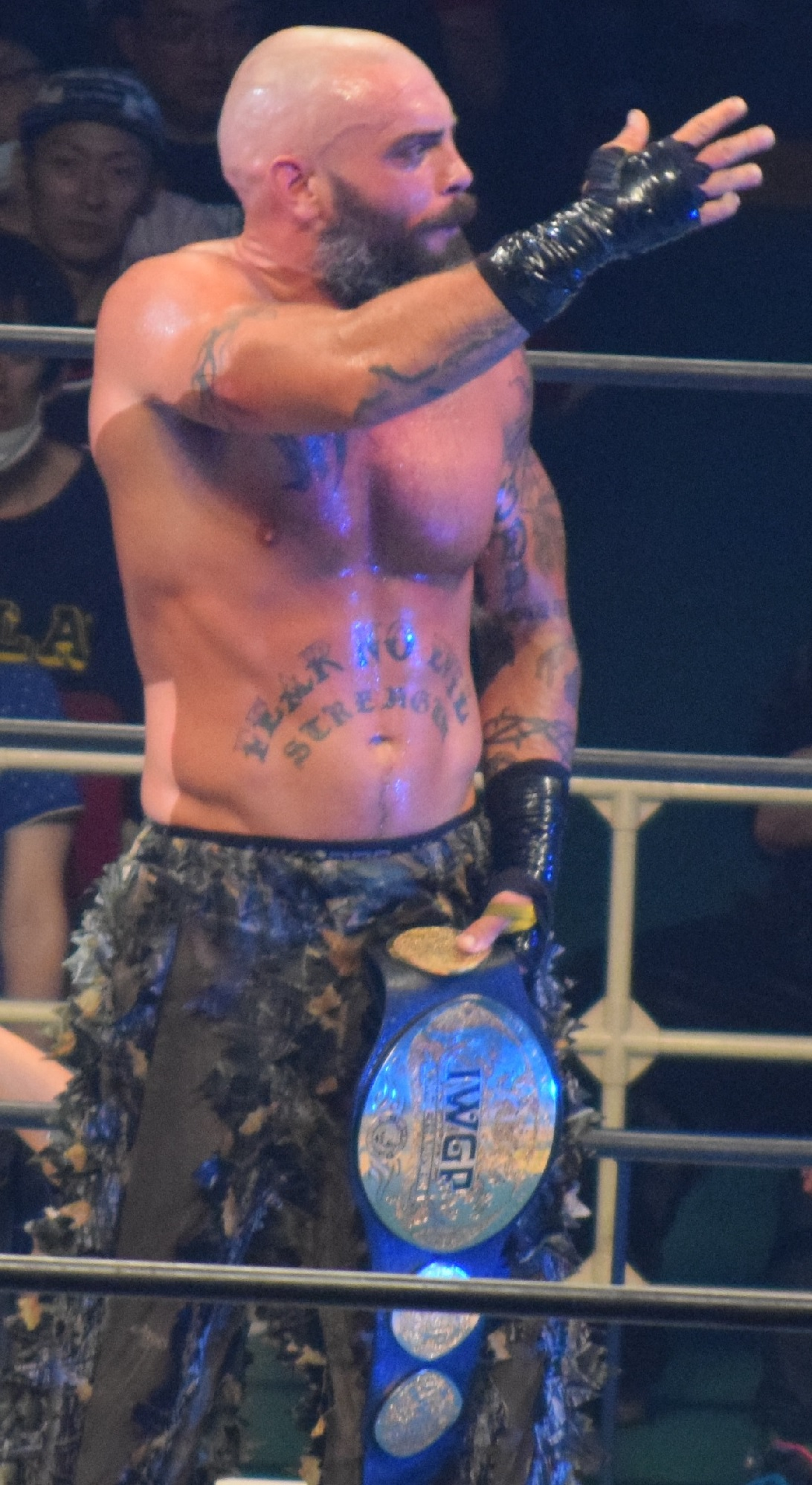
Briscoe as IWGP Tag Team Champion in June 2016.

Through Ring of Honor's working relationship with New Japan Pro-Wrestling (NJPW), the Briscoe Brothers made their NJPW debut on January 4, 2016, at Wrestle Kingdom 10 in the Tokyo Dome, where they teamed with Toru Yano to defeat Bullet Club to become the inaugural NEVER Openweight 6-Man Tag Team Champions. Through their affiliation with Yano, the Briscoe Brothers also became part of the Chaos stable. The three made their first successful title defense the following day against another Bullet Club trio of Fale, Matt Jackson and Nick Jackson. On February 11, 2016, at the New Beginning in Osaka, the Briscoe Brothers and Yano lost the NEVER Openweight 6-Man Tag Team Championship to Bullet Club in their second defense. The Briscoe Brothers and Yano regained the title three days later at the New Beginning in Niigata. On February 20 at Honor Rising: Japan 2016, the Briscoe Brothers and Yano lost the title to the Elite

The Briscoe Brothers returned to NJPW in June 2016 at Dominion 6.19 in Osaka-jo Hall, where they defeated Guerrillas of Destiny to win the IWGP Tag Team Championship. They made their first successful title defense on August 14 against Bullet Club. On September 22 at Destruction in Hiroshima, the Briscoe Brothers defeated reigning IWGP Junior Heavyweight Tag Team Champions the Young Bucks for their second successful title defense. On October 10, 2016, at King of Pro-Wrestling, they lost the title back to Guerrillas of Destiny.

=== Impact Wrestling (2022) ===
On April 1, 2022, at Multiverse of Matches, The Briscoe Brothers made their Impact Wrestling debut, losing to The Good Brothers (Doc Gallows and Karl Anderson). on the April 28 episode of Impact, The Briscoe Brothers returned and defeated Heath and Rhino.

On May 7, 2022, they defeated Violent By Design (represented by Eric Young and Deaner) at Under Siege to win the Impact World Tag Team Championship for the first time. on the May 19 episode of Impact, The Briscoe Brothers defeated Violent By Design (Deaner and Joe Doering) to retain the titles. On the May 26 episode of Impact, The Briscoe Brothers and Josh Alexander defeated Violent By Design (Deaner, Eric Young and Joe Doering) in a six man tag team match. On the June 16 episode of Impact, The Briscoe Brothers defeated Bullet Club (Jay White and Chris Bey).

At Slammiversary, The Briscoe Brothers lost the titles to The Good Brothers (Doc Gallows and Karl Anderson) ending their reign at 43 days. On the June 23 episode of Impact, The Briscoe Brothers and James Storm lost to Honor No More (Eddie Edwards, Matt Taven and Mike Bennett) in a six man tag team match.

== Controversy ==
In June 2011, Pugh caused controversy for making homophobic remarks when he tweeted that he saw "a lot of fags out in New York today". Two months later, in the aftermath of Hurricane Irene, he wrote on Twitter to "dedicate" the hurricane to "all da hoes, sluts, skanks, he-shes, she-hes and homos that be whorin it up on da eastcoast". In May 2013, he attracted an even more widespread backlash for a tweet that said, "The Delaware Senate passed a bill yesterday that allows same sex couples to get married. If that makes you happy, then congratulations ... try and teach my kids that there's nothing wrong with that and I'll fucking shoot you." Later that month, he apologized for the comment on ROH's website and again at a house show, explaining that the comments were meant to reflect the worldview of the "redneck character [he] plays on TV" and not his real views. He also agreed to donate his full salary from the next two shows to the Partners Against Hate charity.

In 2021, Ian Riccaboni, who is an active LGBTQ campaigner outside of wrestling, stated "If folks only knew how Jay supports and puts over all talent, specifically LGBTQ+ talent, as a leader in the locker room." Jay's previous anti-LGBTQ tweets were said to have stopped the brothers from being considered in tryouts for the WWE, as well as being banned from appearing on All Elite Wrestling television and pay-per-views due to the intervention of an unnamed WarnerMedia executive. However, this ban was lifted following his death in 2023, when wrestling journalist Dave Meltzer stated that within the wrestling business, Pugh was considered to have completely reformed his views on the LGBT community following his tweets from the early 2010s, and that Pugh had the support of LGBT wrestlers such as Effy.

== Personal life ==
Pugh married his wife, Ashley Pugh (née Ashley Crothers), in 2008. The couple remained together until his death, and had three children together.

== Death ==
Pugh died in a car crash in Laurel, Delaware, on January 17, 2023, at the age of 38, when a vehicle being driven in the opposite direction of Pugh's vehicle unexpectedly crossed the center line and collided head-on. His death was announced on Twitter by Ring of Honor owner Tony Khan. His funeral was held on January 29, 2023, at Laurel High School, with eulogies being delivered by his parents, brother, and fellow wrestler and commentator Caprice Coleman.

=== Legacy ===
On January 18, an episode of Ring of Honor Honor Club was created as a Briscoe tribute show, entitled Jay Briscoe Tribute and Celebration of Life. The next day, Wrestling Observer Radio journalist Dave Meltzer revealed that plans were made to hold another tribute to Briscoe when Ring of Honor resumed airing its weekly series later in the year.

On the January 20 WWE SmackDown, WWE commentator Michael Cole paid tribute to Briscoe, labeling him and brother Mark as "one of the greatest tag teams in wrestling". WWE CCO Triple H similarly paid tribute in a tweet, commending him as an "...incredible performer who created a deep connection with wrestling fans across the globe."

On Night Two of Wrestle Kingdom 17 on January 21, 2023, New Japan Pro-Wrestling and Pro Wrestling Noah paid tribute to Briscoe by having talent from both companies (led by Hiroshi Tanahashi and Naomichi Marufuji) accompany pictures of Briscoe to the ring, where a ten-bell salute was conducted while the Briscoes' theme played.

Briscoe's brother, Mark, defeated Jay Lethal in the main event of the January 25th, 2023 edition of AEW Dynamite, which would have been Jay's 39th birthday. The entire locker room came out to celebrate Mark's win in honor of his brother. After winning the AEW World Tag Team Championships in April 2023, Briscoe's former rivals, FTR, adorned the nameplates on the titles in his name in tribute.

== Championships and accomplishments ==
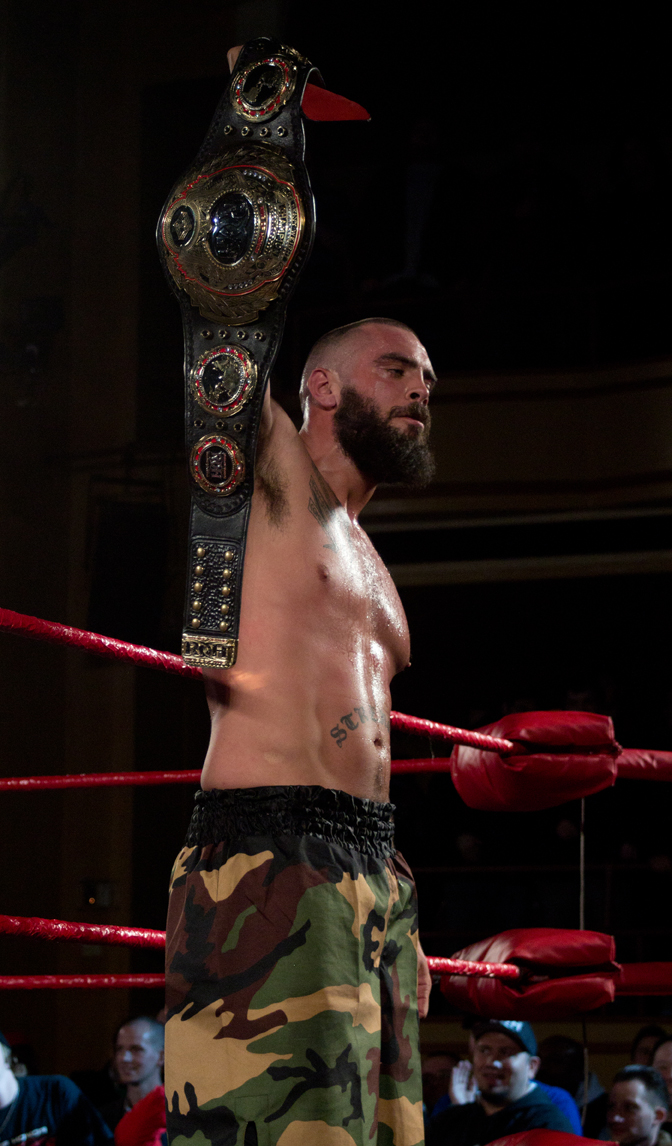
Briscoe was a two-time ROH World Champion.

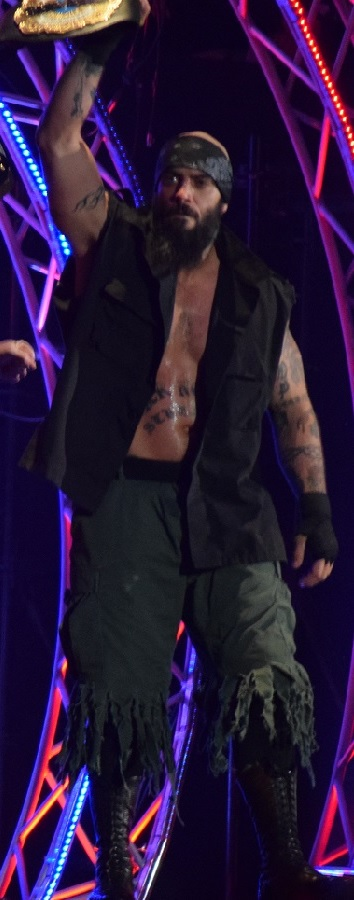
Briscoe as NEVER Openweight 6-Man Tag Team Champion in February 2016.

- Combat Zone Wrestling
  - CZW World Tag Team Championship (2 times) – with Mark Briscoe
- Extreme Rising
  - Match of the Year (2012) with Mark Briscoe vs. Blk Out vs. los Dramáticos
  - Extreme Rising Moment of the Year (2012) with Mark Briscoe Debut in a Cage match against Blk Out and los Fantásticos.
- Full Impact Pro
  - FIP Tag Team Championship (1 time) – with Mark Briscoe
- Game Changer Wrestling
  - GCW Tag Team Championship (3 times) – with Mark Briscoe
- House of Glory
  - HOG Tag Team Championship (1 time) – with Mark Briscoe
- Impact Wrestling
  - Impact World Tag Team Championship (1 time) – with Mark Briscoe
- Indie Wrestling Hall of Fame
  - Class of 2024- with Mark Briscoe
- Jersey All Pro Wrestling
  - JAPW Tag Team Championship (1 time) – with the Insane Dragon
- National Wrestling Alliance
  - Crockett Cup (2022) – with Mark Briscoe
- New Japan Pro-Wrestling
  - IWGP Tag Team Championship (1 time) – with Mark Briscoe
  - NEVER Openweight 6-Man Tag Team Championship (2 times, inaugural) – with Mark Briscoe and Toru Yano
- NWA Wildside
  - NWA Wildside Tag Team Championship (1 time) – with Mark Briscoe
- Premier Wrestling Federation
  - PWF United States Heavyweight Championship (1 time)
  - PWF United States Heavyweight Championship Tournament (2009)
- Pro Wrestling Illustrated
  - Ranked No. 7 of the top 500 wrestlers in the PWI 500 in 2015
- Pro Wrestling Noah
  - GHC Junior Heavyweight Tag Team Championship (1 time) – with Mark Briscoe
- Pro Wrestling Unplugged
  - PWU Tag Team Championship (1 time) – with Mark Briscoe
- Real Championship Wrestling
  - RCW Tag Team Championship (1 time) – with Mark Briscoe
  - RCW Tag Team Championship Tournament (2009) – with Mark Briscoe
- Ring of Honor
  - ROH World Championship (2 times)
  - ROH World Six-Man Tag Team Championship (1 time) – with Bully Ray and Mark Briscoe
  - ROH World Tag Team Championship (13 times) – with Mark Briscoe
  - Honor Rumble (2009) (Note: Jay and his brother Mark were the co-winners of the 2009 Honor Rumble due to it using a tag team-oriented format rather than a singles wrestler-oriented format.)
  - ROH Year-End Award (3 times)
    - Tag Team of the Year (2019) – with Mark Briscoe
    - Tag Team of the Decade (2010s) – with Mark Briscoe
    - Tag Team of the Year (2021) – with Mark Briscoe
  - ROH Hall of Fame (class of 2022)
- Squared Circle Wrestling
  - 2CW Tag Team Championship (1 time) – with Mark Briscoe
- USA Xtreme Wrestling
  - UXW Tag Team Championship (1 time) – with Mark Briscoe
- Wrestling Observer Newsletter
  - Tag Team of the Year (2007) – with Mark Briscoe
  - Feud of the Year (2022) Briscoe Brothers vs. FTR
  - Shad Gaspard/Jon Huber Memorial Award (2023) as part of the Pugh family
