= Iron Mike Steele =

American professional wrestler (1955–2007)

- Iron Mike Steele

Personal information
- Born: John Michael Meek; July 18, 1955 Tampa, Florida, U.S.
- Died: August 29, 2007 (aged 52) Tampa, Florida, U.S.

Professional wrestling career
- Ring name(s): Iron Mike Steele; Iron Mike; Mike Steele
- Billed height: 6 ft 2 in (1.88 m)
- Billed weight: 240 lb (110 kg; 17 st)
- Trained by: Boris Malenko; Tor Kamata

John Michael Meek (July 18, 1955 – August 29, 2007), better known by his ring name Iron Mike Steele, was an American professional wrestler who made frequent appearances on Pro Wrestling Weekly. He was a student of Boris Malenko and Tor Kamata. A Florida native, according to Online World of Wrestling, Steele took part in several matchups with notable wrestlers in the 90s, including Marc Mero and Dean Malenko. However, a motorcycle crash would effectively end his wrestling career in 1994.

In 2003, he broke up a fight between two men in a bar, telling them to leave each other alone. Later the same night, one of the men, Joshua Singletary, killed adversary Charles "Chuck" Rock by setting him on fire.

Meek was killed in a traffic homicide on August 29, 2007. Steele got into a confrontation Harry Brian Taylor, a belligerent, drunk man at a bar. Steele refused to fight him, walked out of the bar, and left on his Harley Davidson motorcycle. Taylor followed behind him in his work van and rammed into Steele's motorcycle, a crash which killed Steele. Taylor was consequently charged with murder and sentenced to life without parole.

The Iron Mike Foundation was started in his name to raise money for children's charity.
