= List of Ring of Honor pay-per-view and livestreaming events =

List of pay-per-view and livestreaming events produced by Ring of Honor

This is a list of pay-per-view and livestreaming events promoted by Ring of Honor (ROH).

== Past events ==
=== 2007 ===
Date	Event	Venue	Location	Main event	Notes	Ref
May 12 (aired July 1)	Respect is Earned	Manhattan Center	New York City, New York	Takeshi Morishima and Bryan Danielson vs. Nigel McGuinness and Kenta		
June 23 (aired September 21)	Driven	Frontier Fieldhouse	Chicago Ridge, Illinois	Bryan Danielson vs. Nigel McGuinness		
September 15 (aired November 30)	Man Up	Frontier Fieldhouse	Chicago Ridge, Illinois	The Briscoe Brothers (Jay Briscoe and Mark Briscoe) (c) vs. Kevin Steen and El Generico in a Ladder War match for the ROH World Tag Team Championship		
(c) – refers to the champion(s) heading into the match

=== 2008 ===
Date	Event	Venue	Location	Main event	Notes	Ref
October 6, 2007 (aired January 18)	Undeniable	Inman Sports Center	Edison, New Jersey	Takeshi Morishima (c) vs. Nigel McGuinness for the ROH World Championship		
December 29, 2007 (aired March 7)	Rising Above	Manhattan Center	New York City, New York	The Briscoe Brothers (Jay Briscoe and Mark Briscoe) (c) vs. No Remorse Corps (Roderick Strong and Rocky Romero) in a two out of three falls match for the ROH World Tag Team Championship		
March 16 (aired May 30)	Take No Prisoners	Pennsylvania National Guard Armory	Philadelphia, Pennsylvania	Nigel McGuinness (c) vs. Tyler Black for the ROH World Championship		
June 7 (aired August 1)	Respect is Earned II	Pennsylvania National Guard Armory	Philadelphia, Pennsylvania	The Age of the Fall (Jimmy Jacobs and Tyler Black) (c) vs. TeamWork (Austin Aries and Bryan Danielson) for the ROH World Tag Team Championship		
July 26 (aired September 26)	New Horizons	Michigan State Fairgrounds & Expo Center	Detroit, Michigan	Bryan Danielson vs. Tyler Black		
September 19 (aired November 14)	Driven	Boston University	Boston, Massachusetts	The Age of the Fall (Jimmy Jacobs and Tyler Black) (c) vs. Kevin Steen and El Generico for the ROH World Tag Team Championship		
(c) – refers to the champion(s) heading into the match

=== 2009 ===
Date	Event	Venue	Location	Main event	Notes	Ref
November 22, 2008 (aired January 16)	Rising Above	Frontier Fieldhouse	Chicago Ridge, Illinois	Nigel McGuinness (c) vs. Bryan Danielson for the ROH World Championship		
January 31 (aired April 17)	Caged Collision	Frontier Fieldhouse	Chicago Ridge, Illinois	Brent Albright, Roderick Strong, Erick Stevens, Jay Briscoe and Ace Steel vs. Sweet & Sour Inc. (Adam Pearce, Tank Toland, The American Wolves (Eddie Edwards and Davey Richards) and Bobby Dempsey) in a Steel Cage Warfare		
April 4 (aired June 12)	Take No Prisoners	George R. Brown Convention Center	Houston, Texas	Kenta and Tyler Black vs. Austin Aries and Katsuhiko Nakajima		
December 19	Final Battle	Hammerstein Ballroom	New York City, New York	Austin Aries (c) vs. Tyler Black for the ROH World Championship	First Ring of Honor pay-per-view to be broadcast live	
(c) – refers to the champion(s) heading into the match

=== 2010 ===
Date	Event	Venue	Location	Main event	Notes	Ref
April 3	The Big Bang!	Grady Cole Center	Charlotte, North Carolina	Blue Demon Jr. and Magno vs. Super Parka and Misterioso		
June 19	Death Before Dishonor VIII	Ted Reeve Arena	Toronto, Ontario, Canada	Tyler Black (c) vs. Davey Richards for the ROH World Championship	First Ring of Honor pay-per-view to take place in Canada.	
September 11	Glory By Honor IX	Manhattan Center	New York City, New York	Tyler Black (c) vs. Roderick Strong in a No Disqualification match for the ROH World Championship		
December 18	Final Battle	Hammerstein Ballroom	New York City, New York	El Generico vs. Kevin Steen in an Unsanctioned Fight Without Honor match for Generico's mask or Steen's ROH career		
(c) – refers to the champion(s) heading into the match

=== 2011 ===
Date	Event	Venue	Location	Main event	Notes	Ref
February 26	ROH 9th Anniversary Show	Frontier Fieldhouse	Chicago Ridge, Illinois	The Briscoe Brothers (Jay Briscoe and Mark Briscoe) vs. Wrestling's Greatest Tag Team (Charlie Haas & Shelton Benjamin) to determine the #1 contenders to the ROH World Tag Team Championship		
April 1	Honor Takes Center Stage	Center Stage	Atlanta, Georgia	Eddie Edwards (c) vs Christopher Daniels for the ROH World Championship		
April 2	Honor Takes Center Stage	Center Stage	Atlanta, Georgia	Wrestling's Greatest Tag Team (Charlie Haas & Shelton Benjamin) vs The American Wolves (Eddie Edwards & Davey Richards)		
June 26	Best in the World 2011	Hammerstein Ballroom	New York City, New York	Eddie Edwards (c) vs Davey Richards for the ROH World Championship	First Ring of Honor pay-per-view under the ownership of Sinclair Broadcasting	
September 17	Death Before Dishonor IX	Manhattan Center	New York City, New York	The Briscoe Brothers (Jay Briscoe and Mark Briscoe) vs. The All Night Express (Kenny King and Rhett Titus) in a Ladder War III match		
December 23	Final Battle	Hammerstein Ballroom	New York City, New York	Davey Richards (c) vs. Eddie Edwards for the ROH World Championship		
(c) – refers to the champion(s) heading into the match

=== 2012 ===
Date	Event	Venue	Location	Main event	Notes	Ref
March 4	ROH 10th Anniversary Show: Young Wolves Rising	Hammerstein Ballroom	New York City, New York	Eddie Edwards & Adam Cole vs. Team Ambition (Davey Richards & Kyle O'Reilly)		
March 30	Showdown in the Sun	War Memorial Auditorium	Fort Lauderdale, Florida	Davey Richards (c) vs. Eddie Edwards vs. Roderick Strong in a Three-way elimination match for the ROH World Championship		
March 31	Showdown in the Sun	War Memorial Auditorium	Fort Lauderdale, Florida	Davey Richards (c) vs. Michael Elgin for the ROH World Championship		
May 12	Border Wars	Ted Reeve Arena	Toronto, Ontario, Canada	Davey Richards (c) vs. Kevin Steen for the ROH World Championship		
June 24	Best in the World: Hostage Crisis	Hammerstein Ballroom	New York City, New York	Kevin Steen (c) vs. Davey Richards in an Anything Goes match for the ROH World Championship		
August 11	Boiling Point	Rhode Island Convention Center	Providence, Rhode Island	Kevin Steen (c) vs. Eddie Kingston in an Anything Goes match for the ROH World Championship		
September 15	Death Before Dishonor X: State of Emergency	Frontier Fieldhouse	Chicago Ridge, Illinois	Kevin Steen (c) vs. Rhino in a No Disqualification match for the ROH World Championship		
October 13	Glory By Honor XI: The Unbreakable Hope	International Centre	Mississauga, Ontario, Canada	Kevin Steen (c) vs. Michael Elgin for the ROH World Championship		
December 16	Final Battle: Doomsday	Hammerstein Ballroom	New York City, New York	Kevin Steen (c) vs. El Generico in a Ladder War IV match for the ROH World Championship		
(c) – refers to the champion(s) heading into the match

=== 2013 ===
Date	Event	Venue	Location	Main event	Notes	Ref
March 2	ROH 11th Anniversary Show	Frontier Fieldhouse	Chicago Ridge, Illinois	Kevin Steen (c) vs. Jay Lethal for the ROH World Championship		
April 5	Supercard of Honor VII	Hammerstein Ballroom	New York City, New York	Kevin Steen (c) vs. Jay Briscoe for the ROH World Championship		
May 4	Border Wars	Ted Reeve Arena	Toronto, Ontario, Canada	Jay Briscoe (c) vs. Adam Cole for the ROH World Championship	Co-produced with Pro Wrestling NOAH	
June 22	Best in the World	Du Burns Arena	Baltimore, Maryland	Jay Briscoe (c) vs. Mark Briscoe for the ROH World Championship		
September 20	Death Before Dishonor XI	Pennsylvania National Guard Armory	Philadelphia, Pennsylvania	Adam Cole vs. Michael Elgin in the final match of the ROH World Championship tournament		
(c) – refers to the champion(s) heading into the match

=== 2014 ===
Date	Event	Venue	Location	Main event	Notes	Ref
May 10	Global Wars	Ted Reeve Arena	Toronto, Ontario, Canada	Adam Cole (c) vs. Kevin Steen for the ROH World Championship	Co-produced with New Japan Pro-Wrestling	
May 17	War of the Worlds	Hammerstein Ballroom	New York City, New York	A.J. Styles (c) vs. Kazuchika Okada vs. Michael Elgin in a triple threat match for the IWGP Heavyweight Championship	Co-produced with New Japan Pro-Wrestling	
June 22	Best in the World	Tennessee State Fairground Sports Arena	Nashville, Tennessee	Adam Cole (c) vs. Michael Elgin for the ROH World Championship		
September 6	All Star Extravaganza VI	Mattamy Athletic Centre	Toronto, Ontario, Canada	reDRagon (Bobby Fish and Kyle O'Reilly) (c) vs. The Young Bucks (Matt Jackson and Nick Jackson) in a 2 out of 3 falls match for the ROH World Tag Team Championship		
December 7	Final Battle	Terminal 5	New York City, New York	Jay Briscoe (c) vs. Adam Cole in a Fight Without Honor match for the ROH World Championship		
(c) – refers to the champion(s) heading into the match

=== 2015 ===
Date	Event	Venue	Location	Main event	Notes	Ref
March 1	ROH 13th Anniversary Show	Orleans Hotel & Casino	Paradise, Nevada	Jay Briscoe (c) vs. Tommaso Ciampa vs. Michael Elgin vs. Hanson in a Four corner survival match for the ROH World Championship		
May 15	Global Wars '15	Ted Reeve Arena	Toronto, Ontario, Canada	ROH All Stars (Hanson, Raymond Rowe, Jay Briscoe and Mark Briscoe and Roderick Strong) vs. Bullet Club (A.J. Styles, Doc Gallows, Karl Anderson, Matt Jackson, and Nick Jackson) in a Ten-man tag team match	Co-produced with New Japan Pro-Wrestling	
June 19	Best in the World 2015	Terminal 5	New York City, New York	ROH World Champion Jay Briscoe vs. ROH World Television Champion Jay Lethal in a Winner Take All match for the ROH World Championship and the ROH World Television Championship		
August 22	Field of Honor 2015	MCU Park	Brooklyn, New York	Jay Lethal and Shinsuke Nakamura vs. reDRagon (Bobby Fish & Kyle O'Reilly)		
September 18	All Star Extravaganza VII	San Antonio Shrine Auditorium	San Antonio, Texas	Jay Lethal (c) vs. Kyle O'Reilly for the ROH World Championship		
December 18	Final Battle	2300 Arena	Philadelphia, Pennsylvania	Jay Lethal (c) (with Truth Martini and Taeler Hendrix) vs. A.J. Styles for the ROH World Championship		
(c) – refers to the champion(s) heading into the match

=== 2016 ===
Date	Event	Venue	Location	Main event	Notes	Ref
February 19	Honor Rising: Japan	Korakuen Hall	Tokyo, Japan	Roderick Strong (c) vs. Tomohiro Ishii for the ROH World Television Championship	Co-produced with New Japan Pro-Wrestling Aired as a two-part event	
February 20	Honor Rising: Japan	Korakuen Hall	Tokyo, Japan	Jay Lethal (c) vs. Tomoaki Honma for the ROH World Championship	Co-produced with New Japan Pro-Wrestling Aired as a two-part event	
February 26	ROH 14th Anniversary Show	Sam's Town Hotel & Gambling Hall	Sunrise Manor, Nevada	Jay Lethal (c) vs. Adam Cole vs. Kyle O'Reilly in a Three Way match for the ROH World Championship		
May 8	Global Wars	Frontier Fieldhouse	Chicago Ridge, Illinois	Jay Lethal (c) vs. Colt Cabana for the ROH World Championship	Co-produced with New Japan Pro Wrestling	
June 24	Best in the World '16	Cabarrus Arena	Concord, North Carolina	Jay Lethal (c) vs. Jay Briscoe for the ROH World Championship		
August 19	Death Before Dishonor XIV	Sam's Town Hotel & Gambling Hall	Sunrise Manor, Nevada	Jay Lethal (c) vs. Adam Cole for the ROH World Championship		
August 27	Field of Honor	MCU Park	Brooklyn, New York	Adam Cole (c) vs. Jay Lethal, Hiroshi Tanahashi and Tetsuya Naito for the ROH World Championship		
September 30	All Star Extravaganza VIII	Lowell Memorial Auditorium	Lowell, Massachusetts	The Addiction (Christopher Daniels and Frankie Kazarian) (c) vs. The Motor City Machine Guns (Alex Shelley and Chris Sabin) vs. The Young Bucks (Matt Jackson and Nick Jackson) in Ladder War VI for the ROH World Tag Team Championship		
December 2	Final Battle	Hammerstein Ballroom	New York City, New York	Adam Cole (c) vs. Kyle O'Reilly for the ROH World Championship		
(c) – refers to the champion(s) heading into the match

=== 2017 ===
Date	Event	Venue	Location	Main event	Notes	Ref
February 26	Honor Rising: Japan	Korakuen Hall	Tokyo, Japan	Bullet Club (Adam Cole and Kenny Omega) vs. The Briscoes (Jay Briscoe and Mark Briscoe	Co-produced with New Japan Pro Wrestling Aired as a two-part event	
February 27	Honor Rising: Japan	Korakuen Hall	Tokyo, Japan	Bullet Club (Cody, Kenny Omega, Matt Jackson and Nick Jackson) vs. Chaos (Jay Briscoe, Kazuchika Okada, Mark Briscoe, and Will Ospreay)	Co-produced with New Japan Pro Wrestling Aired as a two-part event	
March 10	ROH 15th Anniversary Show	Sam's Town Hotel & Gambling Hall	Sunrise Manor, Nevada	Adam Cole (c) vs. Christopher Daniels for the ROH World Championship		
April 1	Supercard of Honor XI	Lakeland Center	Lakeland, Florida	The Hardys (Jeff and Matt Hardy) (c) vs. The Young Bucks (Matt Jackson and Nick Jackson) in a ladder match for the ROH World Tag Team Championship		
May 12	War of the Worlds	Hammerstein Ballroom	New York City, New York	Christopher Daniels (c) vs. Cody vs. Jay Lethal for the ROH World Championship	Co-produced with New Japan Pro-Wrestling	
June 23	Best in the World	Lowell Memorial Auditorium	Lowell, Massachusetts	Christopher Daniels (c) vs. Cody for the ROH World Championship		
August 19	War of the Worlds UK: Liverpool	Liverpool Olympia	Liverpool, England	Cody (c) vs. Sanada for the ROH World Championship	Co-produced with New Japan Pro-Wrestling, Consejo Mundial de Lucha Libre, and Revolution Pro Wrestling	
September 22	Death Before Dishonor XV	Sam's Town Hotel & Gambling Hall	Sunrise Manor, Nevada	Cody (c) (with Brandi Rhodes) vs. Minoru Suzuki for the ROH World Championship		
October 12	Global Wars	Buffalo Riverworks	Buffalo, New York	The Elite (Kenny Omega and The Young Bucks (Matt Jackson and Nick Jackson) (c) vs. The Kingdom (Matt Taven, Vinny Marseglia. and TK O’Ryan) for the ROH World Six Man Tag Team Championship	Co-produced with New Japan Pro Wrestling Aired as a four-part event	
October 13	Global Wars	Stage AE	Pittsburgh, Pennsylvania	Bullet Club (Kenny Omega, Cody, and Marty Scurll) (c) vs. Chaos (Toru Yano, Will Ospreay, and Yoshi-Hashi)	Co-produced with New Japan Pro Wrestling Aired as a four-part event	
October 14	Global Wars	Express Live	Columbus, Ohio	Bullet Club (Kenny Omega, The Young Bucks (Matt Jackson and Nick Jackson)) (c) vs. Best Friends (Trent Beretta and Chuckie T) and Flip Gordon for the ROH World Six Man Tag Team Championship	Co-produced with New Japan Pro Wrestling Aired as a four-part event	
October 15	Global Wars	Odeum Expo Center	Villa Park, Illinois	Kenny Omega (c) vs. Yoshi-Hashi for the IWGP United States Heavyweight Championship	Co-produced with New Japan Pro Wrestling Aired as a four-part event	
November 11	Elite	War Memorial Auditorium	Fort Lauderdale, Florida	Dalton Castle, Jay Lethal, and Kenny King vs. BULLET CLUB (Kenny Omega, Matt Jackson, and Nick Jackson)		
December 15	Final Battle	Hammerstein Ballroom	New York City, New York	Cody (c) vs. Dalton Castle for the ROH World Championship		
(c) – refers to the champion(s) heading into the match

=== 2018 ===
Date	Event	Venue	Location	Main event	Notes	Ref
February 9	Honor Reigns Supreme	Cabarrus Arena & Events Center	Concord, North Carolina	The Young Bucks (Matt Jackson, and Nick Jackson) vs. Best Friends (Chuckie T. and Beretta)		
February 23	Honor Rising: Japan	Korakuen Hall	Tokyo, Japan	Bullet Club (Cody, Hangman Page, and Marty Scurll) vs. Golden Lovers (Kenny Omega and Kota Ibushi) and Chase Owens	Co-produced with New Japan Pro-Wrestling Aired as a two-part event	
February 24	Honor Rising: Japan	Korakuen Hall	Tokyo, Japan	Golden Lovers (Kenny Omega and Kota Ibushi) vs. Bullet Club (Cody and Marty Scurll)	Co-produced with New Japan Pro-Wrestling Aired as a two-part event	
March 3	Manhattan Mayhem	Hammerstein Ballroom	New York City, New York	Bullet Club (Hangman Page, Marty Scurll, Matt Jackson, and Nick Jackson) vs. Shane Taylor and The Kingdom (Matt Taven, TK O'Ryan, and Vinny Marseglia)		
March 9	ROH 16th Anniversary Show	Sam's Town Hotel and Gambling Hall	Sunrise Manor, Nevada	Dalton Castle (c) vs. Jay Lethal for the ROH World Championship		
April 7	Supercard of Honor XII	UNO Lakefront Arena	New Orleans, Louisiana	Dalton Castle (c) vs. Marty Scurll for the ROH World Championship		
April 15	Masters of the Craft	Express Live!	Columbus, Ohio	Dalton Castle vs. Marty Scurll vs. Punishment Martinez vs. Beer City Bruiser		
April 27	Bound By Honor	Palm Beach County Convention Center	West Palm Beach, Florida	The Briscoes (Mark Briscoe and Jay Briscoe) (c) vs. Motor City Machine Guns (Alex Shelley and Chris Sabin) for the ROH World Tag Team Championship	Aired as a two-part event	
April 28	Bound By Honor	RP Funding Center	Lakeland, Florida	Bullet Club (Cody, Marty Scurll, Matt Jackson and Nick Jackson) vs. Dalton Castle, Silas Young, and The Briscoes (Mark Briscoe and Jay Briscoe)	Aired as a two-part event	
May 9	War of the Worlds	Lowell Memorial Auditorium	Lowell, Massachusetts	The Young Bucks (Matt Jackson, and Nick Jackson) vs. Los Ingobernables de Japon (Bushi and Hiromu Takahashi)	Co-produced with New Japan Pro-Wrestling Aired as a four-part event	
May 11	War of the Worlds	Ted Reeve Arena	Toronto, Ontario, Canada	Los Ingobernables de Japon (Bushi, Hiromu Takahashi and Sanada) vs. Colt Cabana, Jay Lethal, and Kenny King	Co-produced with New Japan Pro-Wrestling Aired as a four-part event	
May 12	War of the Worlds	Royal Oak Music Theatre	Royal Oak, Michigan	The Briscoes (Jay Briscoe and Mark Briscoe) vs. Los Ingobernables de Japon (Tetsuya Naito and Bushi)	Co-produced with New Japan Pro-Wrestling Aired as a four-part event	
May 13	War of the Worlds	Odeum Expo Center	Villa Park, Illinois	Bullet Club (Cody, Marty Scurll, Hangman Page, Matt Jackson and Nick Jackson) vs. Los Ingobernables de Japon (Bushi, Sanada, Evil, Tetsuya Naito, and Hiromu Takahashi)	Co-produced with New Japan Pro-Wrestling Aired as a four-part event	
May 24	Honor United	Edinburgh Corn Exchange	Edinburgh, Scotland	The Briscoes (Jay Briscoe and Mark Briscoe) (c) vs. Bullet Club (Cody and Hangman Page) for the ROH World Tag Team Championship	Aired as a three-part event	
May 26	Honor United	Crystal Palace National Sports Centre	London, England	The Kingdom (Matt Taven, TK O'Ryan and Vinny Marseglia) (c) vs. Bullet Club (Hangman Page, Matt Jackson, and Nick Jackson) vs. SoCal Uncensored (Christopher Daniels, Frankie Kazarian, and Scorpio Sky) in a 3 way match for the ROH World Six Man Tag Team Championship	Aired as a three-part event	
May 27	Honor United	Doncaster Dome	Doncaster, Scotland	The Young Bucks (Matt Jackson, and Nick Jackson) vs. Los Ingobernables de Japon (Evil and Sanada) vs. The Briscoes (Jay Briscoe and Mark Briscoe) vs. The Kingdom (Matt Taven, TK O'Ryan and Vinny Marseglia)	Aired as a three-part event	
June 15	State of the Art	Aztec Theatre	San Antonio, Texas	Bullet Club vs. (Hangman Page, Marty Scurll, Matt Jackson, and Nick Jackson) vs. Killer Elite Squad (Davey Boy Smith Jr. and Lance Archer) and The Kingdom (Matt Taven and Vinny Marseglia)	Aired as a two-part event	
June 16	State of the Art	Gilley's Dallas	Dallas, Texas	Silas Young (c) vs. Punishment Martinez for the ROH World Television Championship	Aired as a two-part event	
June 29	Best in the World	UMBC Event Center	Baltimore, Maryland	Dalton Castle (c) vs. Cody vs. Marty Scurll for the ROH World Championship		
July 20	Honor For All	Nashville Municipal Auditorium	Nashville, Tennessee	The Young Bucks (Matt Jackson and Nick Jackson) vs. The Addiction (Christopher Daniels and Frankie Kazarian) vs. The Briscoes (Jay Briscoe and Mark Briscoe)		
August 16	Honor Re-United	Edinburgh Corn Exchange	Edinburgh, Scotland	Bullet Club (Matt Jackson, Nick Jackson and Marty Scurll) vs. Punishment Martinez and The Briscoes (Jay Briscoe and Mark Briscoe)	Aired as a three-part event	
August 18	Honor Re-United	Doncaster Dome	Doncaster, England	Mark Haskins vs. Hangman Page in the International Cup finals	Aired as a three-part event	
August 19	Honor Re-United	York Hall	London, England	Jay Lethal (c) vs. Mark Haskins for the ROH World Championship	Aired as a three-part event	
September 1	All In (Note: This event was produced by Ring of Honor in conjunction with Cody Rhodes and The Young Bucks who were contracted with ROH at the time. It featured talent from various wrestling promotions.)	Sears Centre Arena	Hoffman Estates, Illinois	The Golden Elite (Kota Ibushi, Matt Jackson, and Nick Jackson) vs. Bandido, Rey Fénix, and Rey Mysterio	Co-produced with Cody Rhodes and The Young Bucks as an independent show.	
September 28	Death Before Dishonor XVI	Orleans Arena	Paradise, Nevada	Jay Lethal (c) vs. Will Ospreay for the ROH World Championship		
October 12	Glory By Honor XVI	UMBC Event Center	Baltimore, Maryland	Jay Lethal (c) vs. Silas Young for the ROH World Championship		
October 28 (aired November 3)	Sea of Honor	Norwegian Jade	Miami, Florida to Nassau, Bahamas	Jay Lethal vs. Frankie Kazarian vs. Kenny King vs. Matt Taven in a four corner survival match	Held as part of Chris Jericho's Rock 'N' Wrestling Rager at Sea Taped on all 3 days of the cruise	
October 29 (aired November 3)	Sea of Honor	Norwegian Jade	Miami, Florida to Nassau, Bahamas	Bullet Club (Cody, Kenny Omega, and Marty Scurll) vs. Chris Jericho and The Young Bucks (Matt Jackson and Nick Jackson)	Held as part of Chris Jericho's Rock 'N' Wrestling Rager at Sea Taped on all 3 days of the cruise	
October 30 (aired November 3)	Sea of Honor	Norwegian Jade	Miami, Florida to Nassau, Bahamas	Mushroom Kingdom (Cody as Bowser, Matt Jackson as Luigi, Nick Jackson as Mario, Marty Scurll as Wario, and Hangman Page as Yoshi) vs. Team Impact Wrestling (Brian Cage, Johnny Impact, Ortiz, Sami Callihan, and Santana	Held as part of Chris Jericho's Rock 'N' Wrestling Rager at Sea Taped on all 3 days of the cruise	
November 4	Survival of the Fittest	Express Live!	Columbus, Ohio	Marty Scurll vs. Christopher Daniels vs. Hangman Page vs. Jonathan Gresham vs. PJ Black vs. Guerrero Maya Jr.		
November 7	Global Wars	Androscoggin Bank Colisee	Lewiston, Maine	Los Ingobernables de Japon (Bushi, Evil (wrestler), Sanada and Tetsuya Naito) vs. Chris Sabin, Jay Lethal, Jonathan Gresham, and Kushida	Co-produced with New Japan Pro-Wrestling	
November 8	Global Wars	Lowell Memorial Auditorium	Lowell, Massachusetts	Jay Lethal and Jonathan Gresham vs. Chris Sabin and Kushida vs. The Young Bucks (Matt Jackson and Nick Jackson) vs. The Kingdom (TK O'Ryan and Vinny Marseglia)	Co-produced with New Japan Pro-Wrestling	
November 9	Global Wars	Buffalo RiverWorks	Buffalo, New York	Best Friends (Beretta and Chuckie T.) vs. The Briscoes (Jay Briscoe and Mark Briscoe) vs. The Elite (Adam Page and Cody)	Co-produced with New Japan Pro-Wrestling	
November 11	Global Wars	Mattamy Athletic Centre	Toronto, Ontario, Canada	Jay Lethal (c) vs. Kenny King for the ROH World Championship	Co-produced with New Japan Pro-Wrestling	
December 14	Final Battle	Hammerstein Ballroom	New York City, New York	SoCal Uncensored (Frankie Kazarian and Scorpio Sky) (c) vs. The Briscoes (Jay Briscoe and Mark Briscoe) vs. The Young Bucks (Matt Jackson and Nick Jackson) in a Ladder War VII match for the ROH World Tag Team Championship		
(c) – refers to the champion(s) heading into the match

=== 2019 ===
Date	Event	Venue	Location	Main event	Notes	Ref
January 13	Honor Reigns Supreme	Cabarrus Arena & Events Center	Concord, North Carolina	Jay Lethal (c) vs. Dalton Castle for the ROH World Championship		
January 24	Road to G1 Supercard	Gilley's Dallas	Dallas, Texas	Jay Lethal and Jonathan Gresham vs. Lifeblood (Tracy Williams and Mark Haskins)		
January 25	Road to G1 Supercard	NRG Arena	Houston, Texas	Lifeblood (Juice Robinson, David Finlay, Mark Haskins, and Tracy Williams) and Bandido vs. The Briscoes (Jay Briscoe and Mark Briscoe), Shane Taylor, Silas Young, and Bully Ray		
January 26	Road to G1 Supercard	Austin Highway Event Center	San Antonio, Texas	Villain Enterprises (Brody King and PCO) vs. Lifeblood (David Finlay and Juice Robinson)		
February 10	Bound By Honor	Watsco Center	Coral Gables, Florida	The Kingdom (Matt Taven, TK O'Ryan, and Vinny Marseglia) vs. Jay Lethal, Jonathan Gresham, and Rush		
February 23	Honor Rising: Japan	Korakuen Hall	Tokyo, Japan	Jay Lethal, Kazuchika Okada, and Hiroshi Tanahashi vs. The Kingdom (Matt Taven, TK O'Ryan, and Vinny Marseglia)	Co-produced with New Japan Pro-Wrestling Aired as a two-part event	
February 24	Honor Rising: Japan	Korakuen Hall	Tokyo, Japan	The Briscoes (Jay Briscoe and Mark Briscoe) (c) vs. David Finlay and Juice Robinson for the ROH World Tag Team Championship	Co-produced with New Japan Pro-Wrestling Aired as a two-part event	
March 15	ROH 17th Anniversary Show	Sam's Town Hotel and Gambling Hall	Sunrise Manor, Nevada	The Briscoes (Jay Briscoe and Mark Briscoe) (c) vs. Villain Enterprises (Brody King and PCO) in a Las Vegas Street Fight for the ROH World Tag Team Championship		
March 31	Road to G1 Supercard	UMBC Event Center	Baltimore, Maryland	Marty Scurll vs. Shane Taylor		
April 6	G1 Supercard	Madison Square Garden	New York City, New York	Kazuchika Okada vs. Jay White (c) for the IWGP Heavyweight Championship	Co-produced with New Japan Pro-Wrestling	
April 14	Masters Of The Craft	Express Live!	Columbus, Ohio	Villain Enterprises (Brody King, Marty Scurll and PCO) (c) vs. The Kingdom (Matt Taven, TK O'Ryan, and Vinny Marseglia) in a street fight for the ROH Six-Man Tag Team Championship		
April 27	Crockett Cup	Cabarrus Arena	Concord, North Carolina	Nick Aldis (c) vs. Marty Scurll for the NWA World Heavyweight Championship	Co-produced with National Wrestling Alliance	
May 8	War of the Worlds	Buffalo Riverworks	Buffalo, New York	Guerrillas of Destiny (Tama Tonga and Tanga Loa) (c) vs. Jay Lethal and Jonathan Gresham for the ROH World Tag Team Championship	Co-produced with New Japan Pro Wrestling	
May 9	War of the Worlds	Ted Reeve Arena	Toronto, Ontario, Canada	Matt Taven (c) vs. PCO for the ROH World Championship	Co-produced with New Japan Pro Wrestling	
May 11	War of the Worlds	DeltaPlex Arena	Grand Rapids, Michigan	Jay Lethal, Jeff Cobb, Hirooki Goto, Satoshi Kojima, and Yuji Nagata vs. Bully Ray, The Briscoes (Jay Briscoe and Mark Briscoe), Silas Young & Shane Taylor	Co-produced with New Japan Pro Wrestling	
May 12	War of the Worlds	Odeum Expo Center	Villa Park, Illinois	Jay Lethal vs. Jeff Cobb vs. PCO vs. Rush in a Four Corner Survival match	Co-produced with New Japan Pro Wrestling	
June 1	State Of The Art	ShoWare Center	Kent, Washington	Matt Taven (c) vs. Tracy Williams for the ROH World Championship	Aired as a two-part event	
June 2	State Of The Art	Viking Pavilion	Portland, Oregon	Matt Taven vs. Flip Gordon vs. Mark Haskins vs. PCO	Aired as a two-part event	
June 28	Best in the World	UMBC Event Center	Baltimore, Maryland	Matt Taven (c) vs. Jeff Cobb for the ROH World Championship		
July 20	Manhattan Mayhem	Hammerstein Ballroom	New York City, New York	The Briscoes (Jay Briscoe and Mark Briscoe) (c) vs. Guerrillas of Destiny (Tama Tonga and Tanga Loa) in a street fight for the ROH World Tag Team Championship		
July 21	Mass Hysteria	Lowell Memorial Auditorium	Lowell, Massachusetts	Alex Shelley, Jay Lethal, and Jonathan Gresham vs.The Kingdom (Matt Taven, TK O'Ryan, and Vinny Marseglia)		
August 8	Summer Supercard	Mattamy Athletic Centre	Toronto, Ontario, Canada	The Briscoes (Jay Briscoe and Mark Briscoe) (c) vs. Guerrillas of Destiny (Tama Tonga and Tanga Loa) in a Ladder War VIII match for the ROH World Tag Team Championship	Co-produced with New Japan Pro-Wrestling, and Consejo Mundial de Lucha Libre	
August 24	Saturday Night at Center Stage	Center Stage	Atlanta, Georgia	Matt Taven, Shane Taylor, and The Briscoes (Jay Briscoe and Mark Briscoe) vs. Jay Lethal, Jeff Cobb, Kenny King (wrestler), and Rush		
August 25	Honor For All	Nashville Fairgrounds	Nashville, Tennessee	Matt Taven vs. Jay Lethal vs. Jeff Cobb vs. Kenny King		
September 6	Global Wars Espectacular	Ford Community & Performing Arts Center	Dearborn, Michigan	Bandido vs. Jay Briscoe	Co-produced with Consejo Mundial de Lucha Libre Aired as a three-part event	
September 7	Global Wars Espectacular	Odeum Expo Center	Villa Park, Illinois	Villain Enterprises (Brody King, Flip Gordon, and PCO vs. Lifeblood (Bandido, Mark Haskins, and Tracy Williams)	Co-produced with Consejo Mundial de Lucha Libre Aired as a three-part event	
September 8	Global Wars Espectacular	Potawatomi Hotel & Casino	Milwaukee, Wisconsin	Jeff Cobb and Rush vs. The Kingdom (Matt Taven and Vinny Marseglia)	Co-produced with Consejo Mundial de Lucha Libre Aired as a three-part event	
September 27	Death Before Dishonor XVII	Sam's Town Hotel and Gambling Hall	Sunrise Manor, Nevada	Matt Taven (c) vs. Rush for the ROH World Championship		
September 28	Death Before Dishonor XVII Fallout	Sam's Town Hotel and Gambling Hall	Sunrise Manor, Nevada	Villain Enterprises (Brody King, Marty Scurll, and PCO) (c) vs. The Briscoes (Jay Briscoe and Mark Briscoe) and Dragon Lee for the ROH World Six Man Tag Team Championship		
October 12	Glory By Honor XVII	UNO Lakefront Arena	New Orleans, Louisiana	PCO vs. Marty Scurll		
October 25	Honor United 2019	York Hall	London, England	Jeff Cobb and Rush vs. Villain Enterprises (Flip Gordon and Marty Scurll)	Aired as a three-part event	
October 26	Honor United 2019	Newport Centre	Newport, Wales	Jeff Cobb and Rush vs. Colt Cabana and PCO	Aired as a three-part event	
October 27	Honor United 2019	Bolton Whites Hotel	Bolton, England	Rush vs. Jeff Cobb for the ROH World Championship	Aired as a three-part event	
November 2	The Experience	Stage AE	Pittsburgh, Pennsylvania	Dan Maff and Villain Enterprises (Marty Scurll and PCO) vs. Jeff Cobb, Colt Cabana, and Cheeseburger		
November 3	Unauthorized	Express Live!	Columbus, Ohio	PCO vs. Dan Maff		
December 14	Final Battle	UMBC Event Center	Baltimore, Maryland	Rush (c) vs. PCO for the ROH World Championship		
December 15	Final Battle Fallout	2300 Arena	Philadelphia, Pennsylvania	Villain Enterprises (Marty Scurll and PCO) vs. Dan Maff & Jeff Cobb		
(c) – refers to the champion(s) heading into the match

=== 2020 ===
Date	Event	Venue	Location	Main event	Notes	Ref
January 11	Saturday Night at Center Stage	Center Stage Theater	Atlanta, Georgia	PCO vs. Rush		
January 12	Honor Reigns Supreme	Cabarrus Arena	Concord, North Carolina	Villain Enterprises (Marty Scurll, PCO, and Brody King) vs. La Facción Ingobernable (Rush, Dragon Lee, and Kenny King)		
February 9	Free Enterprise	UMBC Event Center	Baltimore, Maryland	Marty Scurll and PCO vs. Nick Aldis and Rush		
February 28	Bound by Honor	Nashville Municipal Auditorium	Nashville, Tennessee	PCO vs. Dragon Lee		
February 29	Gateway to Honor	Family Arena	St. Charles, Missouri	PCO vs. Rush vs. Mark Haskins in a three-way match for the ROH World Championship		
December 18	Final Battle	UMBC Event Center	Baltimore, Maryland	Rush (c) vs. Brody King for the ROH World Championship		
(c) – refers to the champion(s) heading into the match

=== 2021 ===
Date	Event	Venue	Location	Main event	Notes	Ref
March 26	ROH 19th Anniversary Show	UMBC Event Center	Baltimore, Maryland	Rush (c) vs. Jay Lethal for the ROH World Championship		
July 11	Best in the World	Chesapeake Employers Insurance Arena	Baltimore, Maryland	Rush (c) vs. Bandido for the ROH World Championship		
August 20	Glory By Honor XVIII	2300 Arena	Philadelphia, Pennsylvania	Bandido (c) vs. Flip Gordon for the ROH World Championship	Aired as a two-part event	
August 21	Glory By Honor XVIII	2300 Arena	Philadelphia, Pennsylvania	Matt Taven vs. Vincent	Aired as a two-part event	
September 12	Death Before Dishonor XVIII	2300 Arena	Philadelphia, Pennsylvania	Bandido (c) vs. Brody King vs. Demonic Flamita vs. EC3 in a Four Corner Survival elimination match for the ROH World Championship		
November 12	Honor For All	Chesapeake Employers Insurance Arena	Baltimore, Maryland	Bandido vs. Demonic Flamita		
December 11	Final Battle	Chesapeake Employers Insurance Arena	Baltimore, Maryland	Jonathan Gresham vs. Jay Lethal for the vacant ROH World Championship		
(c) – refers to the champion(s) heading into the match

=== 2022 ===
Date	Event	Venue	Location	Main event	Notes	Ref
April 1	Supercard of Honor XV	Curtis Culwell Center	Garland, Texas	Bandido (c) vs. Jonathan Gresham (interim) to determine the Undisputed ROH World Champion		
July 23	Death Before Dishonor	Tsongas Center	Lowell, Massachusetts	FTR (Cash Wheeler and Dax Harwood) (c) vs. The Briscoe Brothers (Jay Briscoe and Mark Briscoe) in a Two-out-of-three-falls match for the ROH World Tag Team Championship	First Ring of Honor pay-per-view under the ownership of Tony Khan	
December 10	Final Battle	College Park Center	Arlington, Texas	Chris Jericho (c) vs. Claudio Castagnoli for the ROH World Championship		
(c) – refers to the champion(s) heading into the match

=== 2023 ===
Date	Event	Venue	Location	Main event	Notes	Ref
March 31	Supercard of Honor	Galen Center	Los Angeles, California	Claudio Castagnoli (c) vs. Eddie Kingston for the ROH World Championship		
July 21	Death Before Dishonor	CURE Insurance Arena	Trenton, New Jersey	Athena (c) vs. Willow Nightingale for the ROH Women's World Championship		
December 15	Final Battle	Curtis Culwell Center	Garland, Texas	Athena (c) vs. Billie Starkz for the ROH Women's World Championship		
(c) – refers to the champion(s) heading into the match

=== 2024 ===
Date	Event	Venue	Location	Main event	Notes	Ref
April 5	Supercard of Honor	Liacouras Center	Philadelphia, Pennsylvania	Eddie Kingston (c) vs. Mark Briscoe for the ROH World Championship		
July 26	Death Before Dishonor	Esports Stadium Arlington	Arlington, Texas	Mark Briscoe (c) vs. Roderick Strong for the ROH World Championship	Held in conjunction with All Elite Wrestling's Path to All In	
December 20	Final Battle	Hammerstein Ballroom	New York City, New York	Athena (c) vs. Billie Starkz for the ROH Women's World Championship		
(c) – refers to the champion(s) heading into the match

=== 2025 ===
Date	Event	Venue	Location	Main event	Notes	Ref
January 5	Wrestle Dynasty	Tokyo Dome	Tokyo, Japan	Zack Sabre Jr. (c) (with Hartley Jackson, Kosei Fujita, Robbie Eagles, and Ryohei Oiwa) vs. Ricochet for the IWGP World Heavyweight Championship	Co-produced with New Japan Pro-Wrestling, All Elite Wrestling, Consejo Mundial de Lucha Libre, and World Wonder Ring Stardom	
February 15 (air date February 17)	Global Wars Australia	Brisbane Entertainment Centre	Brisbane, Queensland, Australia	Athena (c) vs. Alex Windsor for the ROH Women's World Championship	Co-produced with All Elite Wrestling	
April 12; April 16 (aired April 17)	Prelude to Spring BreakThru	MassMutual Center; MGM Music Hall at Fenway	Springfield, Massachusetts; Boston, Massachusetts	Michael Oku (with Amira Blande) vs. Nick Wayne (with Mother Wayne)		
May 25 (aired May 27)	DEAN~!!! 2	Desert Diamond Arena	Glendale, Arizona	Mad Dog Connelly vs. Adam Priest	Co-produced with ACTION Wrestling	
June 17	CMLL vs. AEW & ROH	Arena México	Mexico City, Mexico	Bandido (c) vs. Máscara Dorada for the ROH World Championship	Co-produced with All Elite Wrestling and Consejo Mundial de Lucha Libre	
July 11	Supercard of Honor	Esports Stadium Arlington	Arlington, Texas	Bandido (c) vs. Konosuke Takeshita for the ROH World Championship	Held in conjunction with All In week	
August 29	Death Before Dishonor	2300 Arena	Philadelphia, Pennsylvania	Athena (c) (with Billie Starkz) vs. Mina Shirakawa for the ROH Women's World Championship		
September 6 (air date February 11)	DEAN~!!! 3	2300 Arena	Philadelphia, Pennsylvania	Shane Taylor vs. AR Fox	Co-produced with ACTION Wrestling	
December 5	Final Battle	Greater Columbus Convention Center	Columbus, Ohio	Athena (c) (with Diamanté) vs. Persephone for the ROH Women's World Championship	Held in conjunction with GalaxyCon Columbus	
(c) – refers to the champion(s) heading into the match

=== 2026 ===
Date	Event	Venue	Location	Main event	Notes	Ref
March 27	Global Wars Canada	St. Clair College Sportsplex	Windsor, Ontario, Canada	The Good Brothers (Karl Anderson and Doc Gallows) vs. Kaito Kiyomiya and Bishop Dyer vs. GOA (Toa Liona and Bishop Kaun) vs. Bryce Hanson and Sheldon Jean for the Inaugural MLP Canadian Tag Team Championship	co-produced with Maple Leaf Pro Wrestling	
May 15	Supercard of Honor	Wicomico Civic Center	Salisbury, Maryland	Athena (c) vs. Maya World vs. Trish Adora vs. Yuka Sakazaki vs. Billie Starkz vs. Zayda Steel for the ROH Women's World Championship		
August 21	Death Before Dishonor	2300 Arena	Philadelphia, Pennsylvania	Athena (c) (with Billie Starkz and Diamante) vs. Hazuki for the ROH Women's World Championship		
(c) – refers to the champion(s) heading into the match

== Upcoming ==
Date	Event	Venue	Location	Main event	Notes	Ref
December 4	Final Battle	Boeing Center at Tech Port	San Antonio, Texas	TBA		
(c) – refers to the champion(s) heading into the match

== Number of events by year ==
- Overall total – 189 (1 more confirmed)
Number of Ring of Honor pay-per-view and livestreaming events
