= Global Wars Mexico =

2025 professional wrestling event

- Promotional poster featuring various ROH and CMLL wrestlers
- Promotion(s): Ring of Honor; Consejo Mundial de Lucha Libre
- Date: June 18, 2025 (aired June 26, 2025)
- City: Mexico City, Mexico
- Venue: Arena México
- Attendance: 16,000

Global Wars chronology
← Previous; Australia	Next → United Kingdom

Ring of Honor event chronology
← Previous; CMLL vs. AEW & ROH	Next → ROH: Supercard of Honor; CMLL: Fantastica Mania

Global Wars Mexico chronology
← Previous; First	Next → 2026

Global Wars Mexico was a 2025 professional wrestling event co-promoted by the American promotion Ring of Honor (ROH) and the Mexican promotion Consejo Mundial de Lucha Libre (CMLL). It is the 19th Global Wars event. The event took place on June 18, 2025 at Arena México in Mexico City, Mexico, and was aired on Honor Club on June 26, 2025. This is the second Global Wars event in 2025, after Global Wars Australia in February, as well as ROH's debut in Mexico.

== Production ==
=== Background ===
Global Wars is a professional wrestling event held sporadically by the American promotion Ring of Honor (ROH) since 2012. Originally named "Border Wars" and co-produced with the Japanese promotion Pro Wrestling Noah, the event was renamed Global Wars in 2014 after ROH announced a partnership with New Japan Pro-Wrestling.

Under the new name, the event became a supershow co-produced by the two promotions. In 2019, ROH announced a three-event tour with the Mexican promotion Consejo Mundial de Lucha Libre as the new partner for the series, renamed "Global Wars Espectacular". The Global Wars Espectacular tour marked the last Global Wars event held by ROH under the ownership of Sinclair Broadcast Group.

On June 13, 2025, ROH announced that it would bring back the "Global Wars" name a second time in 2025 for a co-promoted event with professional wrestling Mexican company Consejo Mundial de Lucha Libre (CMLL), to take place in Mexico City, Mexico at Arena México on June 18.

The previous event was Global Wars Australia in February 2025; it is the first time since 2019 that ROH has hosted two Global Wars events in the same calendar year.

=== Storylines ===
Global Wars Mexico featured professional wrestling matches that involved different wrestlers from pre-existing scripted feuds and storylines. Storylines were produced on ROH's streaming program Ring of Honor Wrestling and CMLL events.

Athena has been feuding with Thunder Rosa as of late in ROH, as on the June 6, 2025 episode of ROH Thunder Rosa came to the aid of Rachel Armstrong as Athena carried on the attack after defeating her. Afterwards Rosa held up Athena's ROH Women's World Championship indicating that she is after the ROH Women's title. Which leads up to Global Wars Mexico as both women have their female allies team up with them for the event. The ROH Women's World Television Champion Red Velvet will be in Athena's corner, while Persephone (fellow female CMLL Mexican wrestler and ally of Thunder Rosa) is in Thunder Rosa's corner. Also on June 17, 2025 Athena called Thunder Rosa irrelevant further leading up to their feud for the event.

== Results ==
No.	Results	Stipulations	Times
1	Persephone and Thunder Rosa defeated Athena and Red Velvet	Tag team match	7:16
2	Nick Wayne vs. Titán ended in a time limit draw	Proving Ground match Due to the draw, Titán earned an ROH World Television Championship match.	10:00
3	Bandido (c) defeated Máscara Dorada by pinfall	Singles match for the ROH World Championship; This match took place at CMLL vs. AEW & ROH.	19:31
4	Blue Panther defeated Lee Moriarty (with Carlie Bravo, Shane Taylor, and Capt. Shawn Dean)	Singles match	11:17
(c) / – the champion(s) heading into the match

== See also ==
- Grand Slam Mexico
- CMLL vs. AEW & ROH
- FantasticaMania Mexico
