= DEAN~!!! 2 =

2025 Ring of Honor professional wrestling event

- Promotional poster featuring several Ring of Honor and ACTION Wrestling pro wrestlers
- Promotion(s): Ring of Honor; ACTION Wrestling
- Date: May 24, 2025 (aired May 27, 2025)
- City: Glendale, Arizona
- Venue: WaterDance Plaza at Desert Diamond Arena

Ring of Honor livestreaming event chronology
← Previous; Prelude to Spring BreakThru	Next → CMLL vs. AEW & ROH

ACTION Wrestling event chronology
← Previous; Se7en	Next → Spin

DEAN~!!! event chronology
← Previous; DEAN~!!!	Next → DEAN~!!! 3

DEAN~!!! 2 was a professional wrestling livestreaming event co-promoted by Ring of Honor and ACTION Wrestling. The event took place on May 24, 2025 at Waterdance Plaza at Desert Diamond Arena in Glendale, Arizona and aired on tape delay on Ring of Honor's YouTube channel on May 27, 2025.

== Production ==
Other on-screen personnel
Role:	Name:
Commentators	Dylan Hales
Commentators	John Mosley

=== Background ===
On April 22, 2025, Tony Khan announced on the Way of the Blade podcast that AEW would co-produce two tribute shows dedicated to Dean Rasmussen, the founder of the Death Valley Driver Video Review magazine and the DVDVR forums who passed away in 2023. The shows would also be aired on Ring of Honor's YouTube channel with the first show originally being scheduled to take place Scottsdale, Arizona before Double or Nothing and the second show taking place in September at the 2300 Arena in Philadelphia, Pennsylvania.

=== Storylines ===
DEAN~!!! 2 featured professional wrestling matches that involves different wrestlers from pre-existing scripted feuds and storylines. Wrestlers portrayed villains, heroes, or less distinguishable characters in scripted events that built tension and culminated in a wrestling match or series of matches. Storylines were produced on Ring of Honor's various events and on their weekly show and on various ACTION Wrestling events.

== Results ==
No.	Results	Stipulations	Times
1	Rhino defeated Manders by pinfall	Singles match	6:15
2	Los Desperados (Arez and Gringo Loco) defeated The Coven of the Goat (Jaden Newman and Tank) (with Reverend Dan Wilson) by pinfall	Tag team match	9:18
3	Josh Woods (with Tom Lawlor) defeated JD Drake (with Anthony Henry) by pinfall	Singles match	6:48
4	The Beast Mortos defeated Slim J by pinfall	Singles match	8:24
5	Lee Moriarty (with Shawn Dean) (c) defeated Matt Mako by pinfall	Singles match for the ROH Pure Championship	10:04
6	Blue Panther, Hologram, Neon, Valiente and Virus defeated Averno, Dr. Cerebro, Euforia, Volador Jr., and Xeluha	Torneo Cibernetico ten man elimination match	23:58
7	Mad Dog Connelly defeated Adam Priest by referee's decision	Dog collar match	7:09
(c) / – the champion(s) heading into the match
