= Global Wars United Kingdom =

2025 professional wrestling event

ROH Global Wars United Kingdom
- Promotional poster featuring various ROH wrestlers
- Promotion: Ring of Honor (ROH)
- Date: December 13 and December 17, 2025 (aired December 18, 2025)
- City: Cardiff, Wales (Dec. 13); Manchester, England (Dec. 17)
- Venue: Utilita Arena Cardiff (Dec. 13); Co-op Live (Dec. 17)

Ring of Honor events chronology
← Previous; Final Battle	Next → Boxing Day Brawl

ROH Global Wars chronology
← Previous; Mexico	Next → ROH x Metroplex

Global Wars United Kingdom was a professional wrestling event promoted by the American promotion Ring of Honor. It is the 20th Global Wars event. The event took place on December 13 and 17, 2025 at Utilita Arena Cardiff in Cardiff, Wales and Co-op Live in Manchester, England, and was aired on tape delay on December 18, 2025 on Honor Club as an episode of Ring of Honor Wrestling. This was the third Global Wars event in 2025 after Global Wars Australia and Global Wars Mexico.

== Production ==
=== Background ===
Global Wars is a professional wrestling event held sporadically by the American promotion Ring of Honor (ROH) since 2012. Originally named "Border Wars" and co-produced with the Japanese promotion Pro Wrestling Noah, the event was renamed Global Wars in 2014 after ROH announced a partnership with New Japan Pro-Wrestling.

Under the new name, the event became a supershow and later a multi-day tour co-produced by the two promotions. In 2019, ROH announced a three-event tour with the Mexican promotion Consejo Mundial de Lucha Libre as the new partner for the series, renamed "Global Wars Espectacular". The Global Wars Espectacular tour marked the last Global Wars event held by ROH under the ownership of Sinclair Broadcast Group.

On December 11, 2025, ROH announced that they would bring back the "Global Wars" name for the third time this year with matches being taped at Utilita Arena Cardiff in Cardiff, Wales and Co-op Live in Manchester, England on December 13 and December 17, 2025 respectively.

The previous events were Global Wars Australia in February 2025 and Global Wars Mexico in June 2025; it is the first time since 2019 that ROH has hosted three Global Wars events in the same calendar year.

=== Storylines ===
Other on-screen personnel
Role:	Name:
Commentators	Ian Riccaboni
Commentators	Caprice Coleman

Global Wars United Kingdom featured professional wrestling matches that involved different wrestlers from pre-existing scripted feuds and storylines. Storylines were produced on ROH's streaming program Ring of Honor Wrestling.

== Results ==
No.	Results	Stipulations	Times
1	Michael Oku defeated Rocky Romero	Singles match	9:46
2	Mark Davis defeated Evil Uno	Singles match	6:36
3	Alex Windsor defeated Nina Samuels	Singles match	8:29
4	Lee Johnson defeated Lio Rush	Singles match	6:57
5	Blake Christian defeated Angélico	Singles match	6:43
6	Red Velvet (c) defeated Session Moth Martina	Proving Ground match Since Martina did not last ten minutes, she did not earn an opportunity to challenge for Velvet's ROH Women's World Television Championship	3:58
7	Nigel McGuinness defeated Wheeler Yuta	Singles match	10:48
(c) / – the champion(s) heading into the match
