= Brian Kendrick =

American professional wrestler (born 1979)

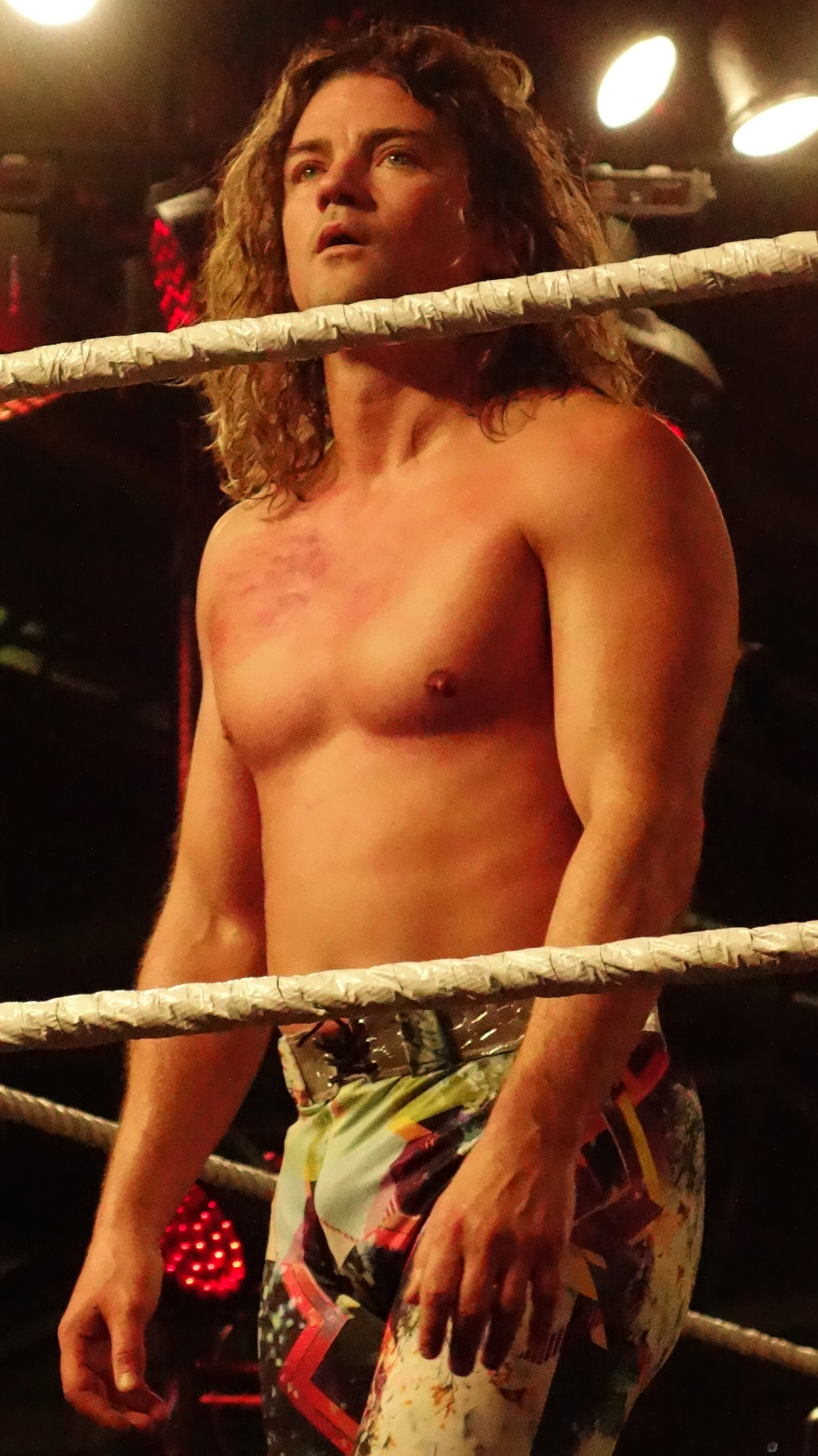
- Kendrick in 2019

Personal information
- Born: Brian David Kendrick; May 29, 1979 (age 47) Fairfax, Virginia, U.S.
- Spouse: Taylor Matheny (m. 2008)

Professional wrestling career
- Ring name(s): Brian Kendrick; The Brian Kendrick; Leonardo Spanky; Spanky
- Billed height: 5 ft 7 in (1.70 m)
- Billed weight: 175 lb (79 kg)
- Billed from: Venice, California; Olympia, Washington; Orlando, Florida
- Trained by: Shawn Michaels; Rudy Boy Gonzalez; Texas Wrestling Academy; Tracy Smothers
- Debut: October 8, 1999

Brian David Kendrick (born May 29, 1979) is an American professional wrestler. He is best known for his tenure in WWE. He is also known for his time in Ring of Honor (ROH), Total Nonstop Action Wrestling (TNA), New Japan Pro-Wrestling (NJPW), and Pro Wrestling Zero1 (Zero1).

Kendrick began his career in 1999. During the early years of his career, Kendrick wrestled as Leonardo Spanky or simply Spanky for several small American promotions like ROH and TNA and for Japanese promotions like Zero1, where he won the NWA International Lightweight Tag Team Championship and Zero-One United States Openweight Championship. In the early 2000s, he also had two stints with the World Wrestling Federation (WWF, later World Wrestling Entertainment), one as a developmental wrestler and a second stint where he appeared as part of the main roster before departing. He would make his return to WWE in 2005, where he was paired with Paul London. During his time as a tag team, they would win the World Tag Team Championship and the WWE Tag Team Championship, with the latter becoming the longest reign of the title until 2016. After the team was dissolved, he began a singles career as The Brian Kendrick, with Ezekiel Jackson as his enforcer. He would leave WWE in 2009. The next year, Kendrick would make his return to TNA, where he stayed for two years, winning the TNA X Division Championship. He also worked until 2016 on the independent circuit and toured occasionally with NJPW.

In 2014, Kendrick began to work with WWE as a trainer. He would make his return to the ring during the 2016 Cruiserweight Classic, a tournament held by WWE for cruiserweight wrestlers. Despite not winning the tournament, Kendrick was assigned to 205 Live, a newly created cruiserweight brand, where he would capture the WWE Cruiserweight Championship once. During the following years, Kendrick worked on both the 205 Live and NXT UK programs, until he began to work as a backstage producer for the NXT brand.

Kendrick is also a promoter. He currently owns and operates his own promotion, called Brian Kendrick's Wrestling Pro Wrestling, as well as a professional wrestling trainer at Pro Wrestling Unpluggeds Kayfabe college

== Early life ==
Kendrick was born in the Washington, D.C., suburb of Fairfax, Virginia, and is the son of Barbara Kendrick and the oldest of three children—a brother named Neal and a sister named Shannon. He later moved to Olympia, Washington where he attended North Thurston High School in Lacey, Washington. During his senior year, he worked as a dishwasher at Dirty Dave's Pizza Parlor while saving money to attend wrestling school.

While growing up, Kendrick's favorite wrestlers included Ultimate Warrior, Blue Blazer and Koko B. Ware. He was also a fan of Shawn Michaels, who trained him, and Chris Jericho. He was already very good friends with his former tag team partner Paul London, as well as with Lance Cade and Bryan Danielson, both of whom he trained with.

== Professional wrestling career ==
=== Early career (1999–2000) ===
In 1999, he moved to Texas to begin training at the NWA Southwest wrestling school and later attended the Shawn Michaels Wrestling Academy. It was there that Kendrick adopted the ring name Spanky, a nickname he was given due to his method of staying awake during long drives on the indy circuit. He made his professional wrestling debut on October 8, 1999, in a match with American Dragon that ended in a 10-minute time limit draw.

=== Memphis Championship Wrestling (2000–2001) ===
In February 2000, Kendrick signed a developmental deal with the World Wrestling Federation (WWF), spending a year in the company's "farm territory", Memphis Championship Wrestling (MCW), before the promotion closed and Kendrick was released from his contract. Kendrick won his first Championship in MCW when he defeated American Dragon for the MCW Southern Light Heavyweight Championship on September 22. He later teamed with American Dragon to win the MCW Southern Tag Team Championship, on December 1, becoming a double champion. The tag team disbanded after they lost the Championships to The Dupps. On December 30, however, the Southern Light Heavyweight title was declared vacant after a match that Kendrick had with Derrick King. In a match for the vacant championship, Kendrick regained the title after beating King, on January 6, 2001. He later dropped it to Tyler Gates, before regaining it on May 11. On June 1, however, Spanky was stripped of the title and it was abandoned, making Spanky the last ever MCW Southern Light Heavyweight Champion. He also holds the record for most reigns, with three.

=== Independent circuit (2001) ===
In October 2001, Kendrick wrestled American Dragon in the first round of The King of the Indies tournament, but lost. The crowd, however, gave both men a standing ovation after the match.

=== Ring of Honor, Japan and various promotions (2002) ===
On February 23, 2002, Kendrick wrestled on the premiere show of Ring of Honor (ROH), winning the match to gain an ROH contract. While in ROH, Kendrick competed in several other promotions such as Heartland Wrestling Association and All Pro Wrestling, before leaving for Japan in June to compete in Pro Wrestling Zero-One (Zero-One). There, he wrestled under the ring name Leonardo Spanky, a gimmick proposed by Shinya Hashimoto due to Kendrick's resemblance to Leonardo DiCaprio. On June 29, he became the first International Junior Heavyweight Champion in company history. He dropped the title to Low Ki a few months later.

=== World Wrestling Entertainment (2002–2004) ===
In late 2002, Kendrick signed a contract with WWE, but was unable to compete until he completed his time in the independent circuit. He made his WWE debut on the edition of January 11, 2003, of Velocity under the gimmick of a mascot representing the local sports team of the town in which he was competing. He continued wearing masks for several weeks, each time competing under a different identity. After acting as a telegram deliverer for Big Show to Undertaker, and getting a Last Ride for his troubles, he showed up the following week and began a series of events trying to impress the then General Manager of Smackdown! Stephanie McMahon in order to earn a contract for the WWE, including trying to last five minutes in a match with Kurt Angle. He eventually earned himself a contract on the March 20, 2003, episode of Smackdown! by defeating Shannon Moore. His first major storyline within WWE came on the May 1, 2003, episode of SmackDown!. He reverted to his former "Spanky" ring name after he interrupted a promo by John Cena. The two feuded over their similar hip hop gimmicks, until May 22. On October 30, Spanky began teaming with Paul London until January 13, 2004, when Kendrick left WWE to return to Zero1.

=== Japan and Independent circuit (2004–2005) ===
After leaving WWE, Kendrick wrestled in different independent promotions. He returned to Pro Wrestling Zero1 as "Spanky" and was quickly pushed to capture the NWA International Lightweight Tag Team Championship. This occurred with partner Low Ki on February 19, 2004, when they defeated Dick Togo and Ikuto Hidaka. They lost the championship to Tatsuhito Takaiwa and Tomohiro Ishii a few months later. Kendrick gained a new tag team partner in Kaz Hayashi, on September 19, 2004, and won back the championships. They held onto the titles until March 2005, when they dropped them to Hidaka and Minoru Fujita. Although he lost the tag titles in March, Kendrick, as Spanky, received a singles push, and won the Zero-One United States Openweight Championship that same month. but he lost the title in September 2005.

=== Total Nonstop Action Wrestling (2004) ===
Kendrick had a brief stint in Total Nonstop Action Wrestling in November 2004 under the ring name "Spanky" on the November 4 episode of Impact where he defeated Kaz, Matt Sydal and Amazing Red, in a four-way match. At TNA's first monthly three-hour PPV event Victory Road, Spanky competed in a 20-man X-Division Gauntlet match for the X Division Cup the match was won by Héctor Garza.

=== Return to ROH (2004–2005) ===
He then returned to ROH, as well as debuting on its sister promotion Full Impact Pro (FIP) on December 17, 2004, winning the first ever Florida Rumble. On February 25, Kendrick wrestled a match against fellow WWE alumnus, James Gibson. Throughout the match, the crowd chanted "Welcome Back!" and "SmackDown! Sucks!", and both men received a standing ovation after the match. During his time in ROH, Kendrick was booked as a mid-carder, consistently having matches late on the card. Kendrick also competed in the Trios Tournament, but lost in the first round with his team members, Gibson and Nigel McGuinness. He unsuccessfully competed for several titles such as the ROH Pure Championship, ROH World Championship and ROH World Tag Team Championship. In July 2005, Kendrick announced that he had re-signed with World Wrestling Entertainment, and would be returning there after he had fulfilled his obligations on the Independent circuit. In FIP, Kendrick won the FIP Tag Team Championship with Sal Rinauro on August 6, 2005, but lost it to The Heartbreak Express less than a month later, shortly before he returned to WWE.

=== Return to WWE (2005–2009) ===
==== Teaming with Paul London (2005–2008) ====
In July 2005, Kendrick announced that after he had fulfilled his obligations on the independent circuit, he would return to WWE. He made his return during a live event on August 22, 2005, losing in a Fatal Four-Way match for the WWE Cruiserweight Championship. He then reformed a tag team with his former partner Paul London on the edition of September 30 of Velocity. On December 16, the pair remade their image, wearing theatrical masks to the ring with matching vests and shorts. They were quickly elevated into the WWE Tag Team Championship picture, receiving a non-title match against WWE Tag Team Champions MNM on the edition of February 10, 2006, of SmackDown!, which London and Kendrick lost. On April 7, they faced MNM again, picking up a win in a non-title match. Their storyline feud continued, as London and Kendrick continued their winning streak over the champions, including singles victories for both Kendrick and London on MNM members Johnny Nitro and Joey Mercury, respectively. London and Kendrick won the WWE Tag Team Championship at Judgment Day, thus defeating MNM six times in a row in singles and tag team matches altogether.

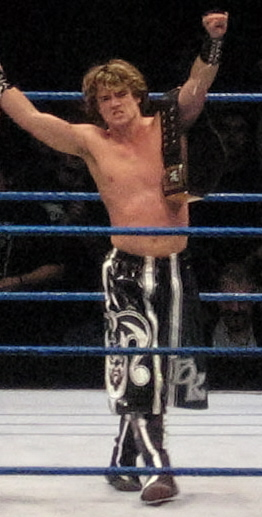
Kendrick as WWE Tag Team Champion in December 2006

Their first main competition for the titles came when K. C. James and Idol Stevens defeated the champions in a non-title match, in early August, igniting a storyline feud between the two teams. During the rivalry, WWE Diva Ashley Massaro began accompanying London and Kendrick to the ring, acting as a valet to the team while combating the actions of James and Stevens' manager Michelle McCool.

On October 14, London and Kendrick became the longest reigning WWE Tag Team Champions until 2016, surpassing MNM's previous record of 145 days. Despite this, they were still booked as the underdogs in their feuds, and this was shown when they began a losing streak to the team of William Regal and Dave Taylor. Regal defeated both in singles matches and on the December 8 episode of SmackDown!, Kendrick and London lost a non-title tag team match to the duo. London and Kendrick had a scheduled title defense at Armageddon, against Regal and Taylor. Before the pay-per-view, the match changed into a Fatal Four Way tag team ladder match with London and Kendrick defending their titles against Regal and Taylor, MNM, and The Hardys. London and Kendrick won the match and retained the titles.

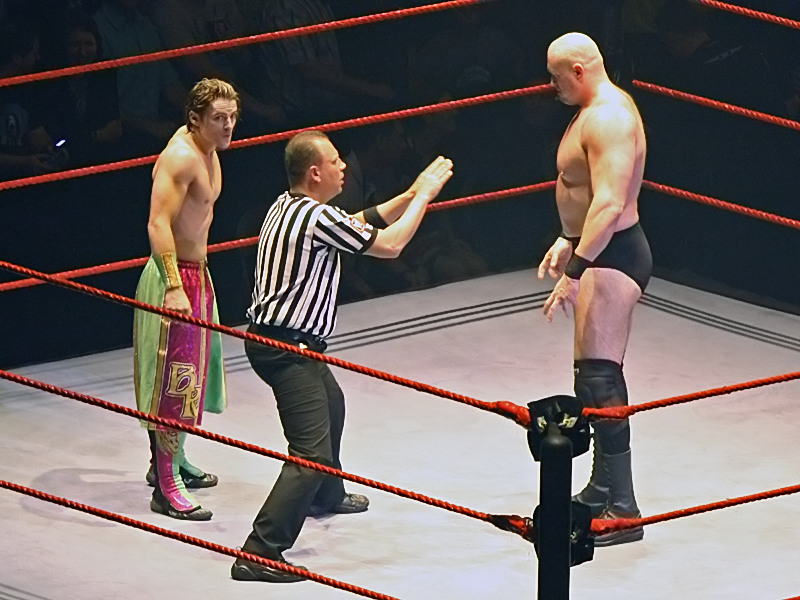
Kendrick facing Snitsky during 2007

On February 2, 2007, London and Kendrick suffered a non-title loss to the rookie team Deuce 'n Domino. In a title match at No Way Out, London and Kendrick retained the championship. London and Kendrick, however, dropped the championship to them on the edition of April 20 of SmackDown!, ending their reign at 331 days (SmackDown! was recorded on April 17). In the storyline, London missed a moonsault from the ring apron to the floor during the title match, injuring his ribs, leaving Kendrick to battle Deuce 'n Domino alone. London and Kendrick unsuccessfully competed for the title on June 1 in a triple threat tag team match, which also involved Regal and Taylor, and lost a rematch on June 15 in a standard tag team match.

Kendrick, along with London, was drafted to the Raw brand on June 17, 2007, during the Supplemental Draft. They won their debut match on Raw against The World's Greatest Tag Team on June 18. They were soon established as a threat to the tag titles, and on the edition of September 3 of Raw, they won a number one contender's match for Lance Cade and Trevor Murdoch's World Tag Team Championship. Kendrick and London then worked a feud with Cade and Murdoch, and at a house show on September 5, they defeated Cade and Murdoch to win the titles, only to lose it back to Cade and Murdoch three days later. London and Kendrick continued to feud with Cade and Murdoch and lost to the Tag Team champions at Unforgiven. For the rest of 2007, London and Kendrick mainly competed on Heat or in tag title bouts, until London got injured in late 2007. As a result, Kendrick was mainly used as a jobber on Raw, until London returned at the start of February 2008, although Kendrick still won sometimes on Heat.

In his next storyline, Kendrick abandoned London during a handicap match with Umaga. This abandonment resulted in Umaga performing the Samoan Spike on London, allowing Umaga to pick up the win over the duo. London and Kendrick still teamed together with no apparent dissension rising between the former tag team champions. After defeating Charlie Haas and Robbie McAllister on Heat, London and Kendrick said they were ready to win the World Tag Team Championship. London and Kendrick beat the champions Hardcore Holly and Cody Rhodes next week on Heat in a non-title match. However, they failed to win the World Tag Team Titles on Raw after Holly pinned London.

==== Championship pursuits (2008–2009) ====
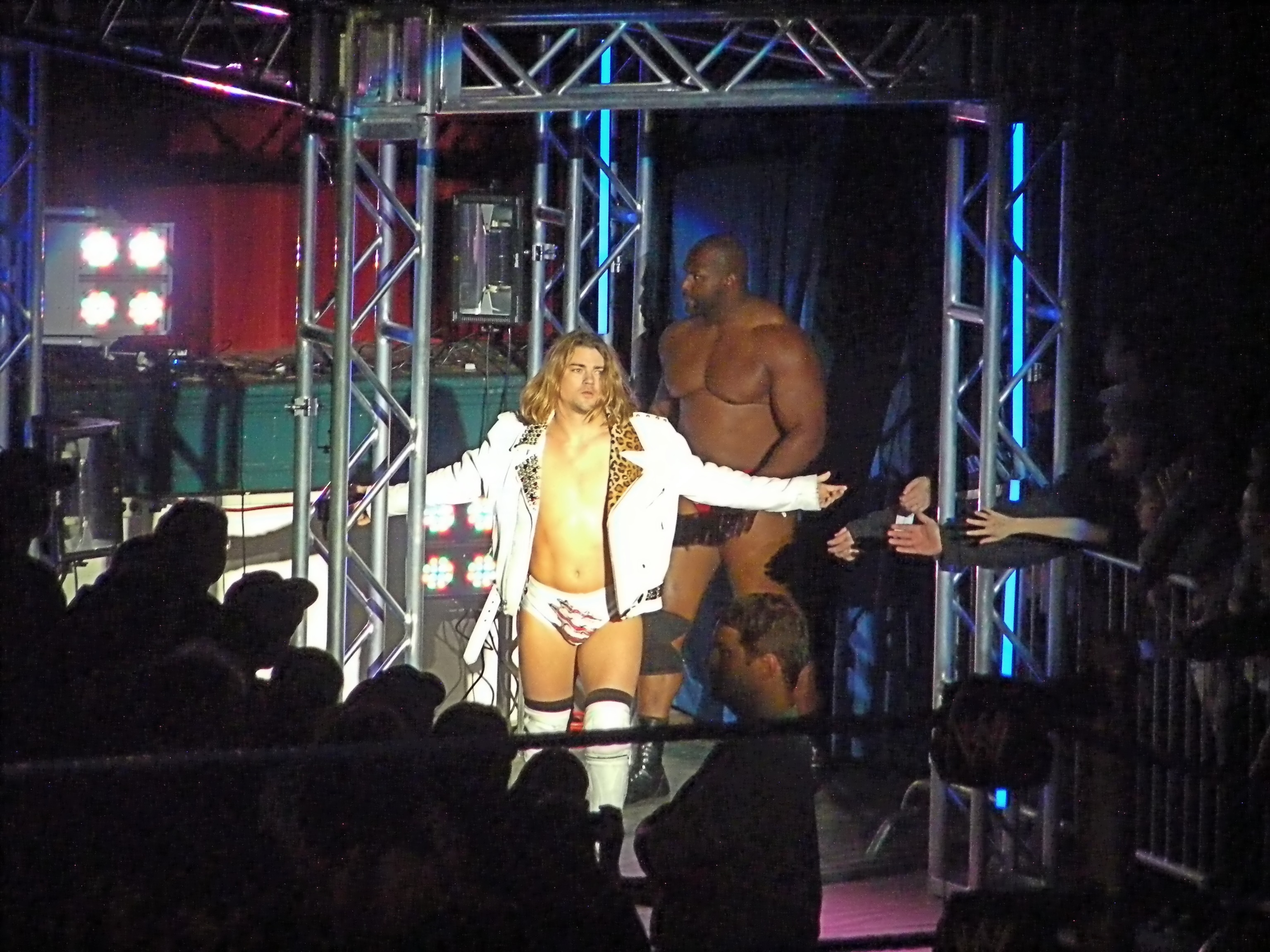
"The Brian Kendrick" and Ezekiel Jackson in 2009

As part of the 2008 WWE Supplemental Draft, Kendrick was drafted back to the SmackDown brand while London stayed on Raw, thus ending the team. He made his return to the brand on the July 18, 2008, airing of SmackDown, as a heel, with new ring attire, changing his name to The Brian Kendrick and accompanied by Ezekiel Jackson. On the August 22 edition of SmackDown, Kendrick won a 10-man battle royal to qualify for the WWE Championship Scramble match at Unforgiven. Kendrick pinned Jeff Hardy with the on-screen graphics displaying that he was the current WWE champion. However, as Kendrick was not champion at the end of the match, he never officially held the title. He later teamed with Jackson on many occasions, becoming number one contenders to the WWE Tag Team Championship held by Carlito and Primo, but they never managed to win the championship.

On April 15, 2009, Kendrick was separated from Jackson as he was drafted back to the Raw brand as part of the 2009 Supplemental Draft while Jackson was drafted to the ECW brand. He wrestled his return match on Raw on the April 27 episode, against Kofi Kingston. He won a match on Raw after defeating Carlito on the May 11 episode before declaring his intention to win the Unified WWE Tag Team Championship; in the following weeks, Kendrick tried several unsuccessful pairings. In his final match, he was defeated by Kofi Kingston while cutting a promo on Jerry Lawler. The match ended with Kendrick turning around into Trouble In Paradise. On July 30, 2009, WWE announced that Kendrick was released from his contract.

=== Return to the independent circuit (2009–2016) ===
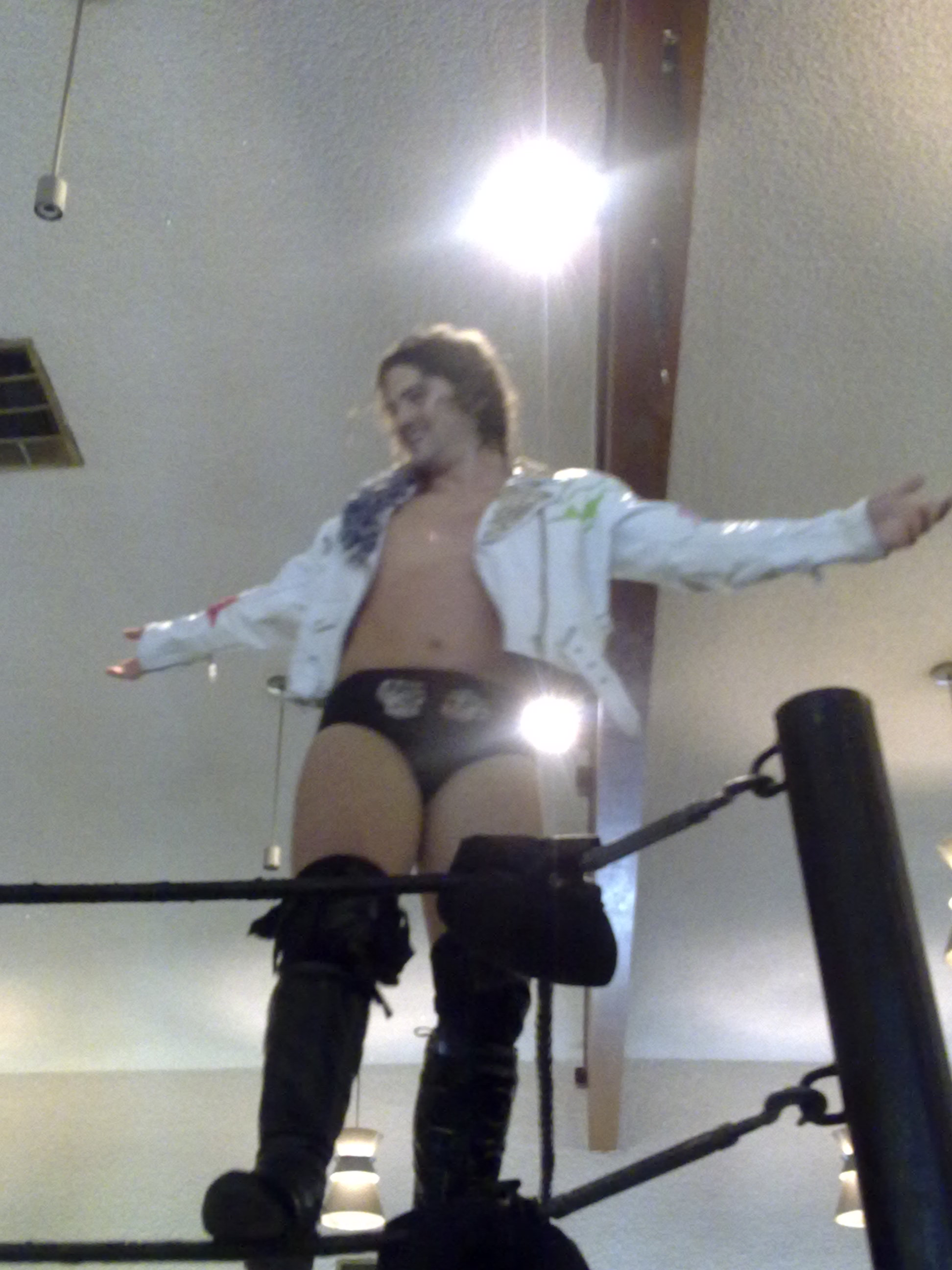
Kendrick at the 2009 Battle of Los Angeles.

Kendrick signed with Dragon Gate USA on August 6, 2009. His first match for the company, a losing effort against Cima at Untouchable, aired on pay-per-view edited down to only the highlights of the match. On August 28 he made his return to Pro Wrestling Guerrilla at Speed of Sound where he, wrestling as a heel, defeated Bryan Danielson after a low blow. Afterwards he formed an alliance with PWG World Tag Team Champions The Young Bucks and started a feud with El Generico, Colt Cabana and the PWG World Champion Kenny Omega. On December 19 Ring of Honor announced that Kendrick would be making his return to the company on February 13, 2010, at the 8th Anniversary Show. At the event Kendrick was defeated by Roderick Strong.

On January 30, 2010, at PWG's WrestleReunion 4 the Young Bucks decided that Kendrick did not fit in with them and turned on him, only for him to be saved by his old tag team partner Paul London. Later in the night, Kendrick and London defeated the Young Bucks, now renamed Generation Me, in a non-title match. On March 27, 2010, at the tapings of Dragon Gate USA's Mercury Rising pay-per-view, Kendrick was defeated by Jimmy Jacobs in a Loser Leaves Company tag team match, where he teamed with Paul London against Jacobs and Jack Evans and as a result was forced to leave the company for good.

On March 30, 2014, Kendrick made his ICW debut in a match against Joe Coffey at ICW - Still Smokin' in the O2 ABC in Glasgow, Scotland, where he was narrowly defeated. On September 8, 2014, it was announced that Kendrick would once again team up with Paul London to take on The New Age Kliq in Newcastle, England, on October 5 for the Insane Championship Wrestling Tag-Team Championship. Both men won the titles and lost them on November 2, 2014.

Kendrick made an appearance for Ring of Honor on February 2, 2016, defeating Will Ferrara in a non-televised match.

=== Return to TNA (2010–2012) ===
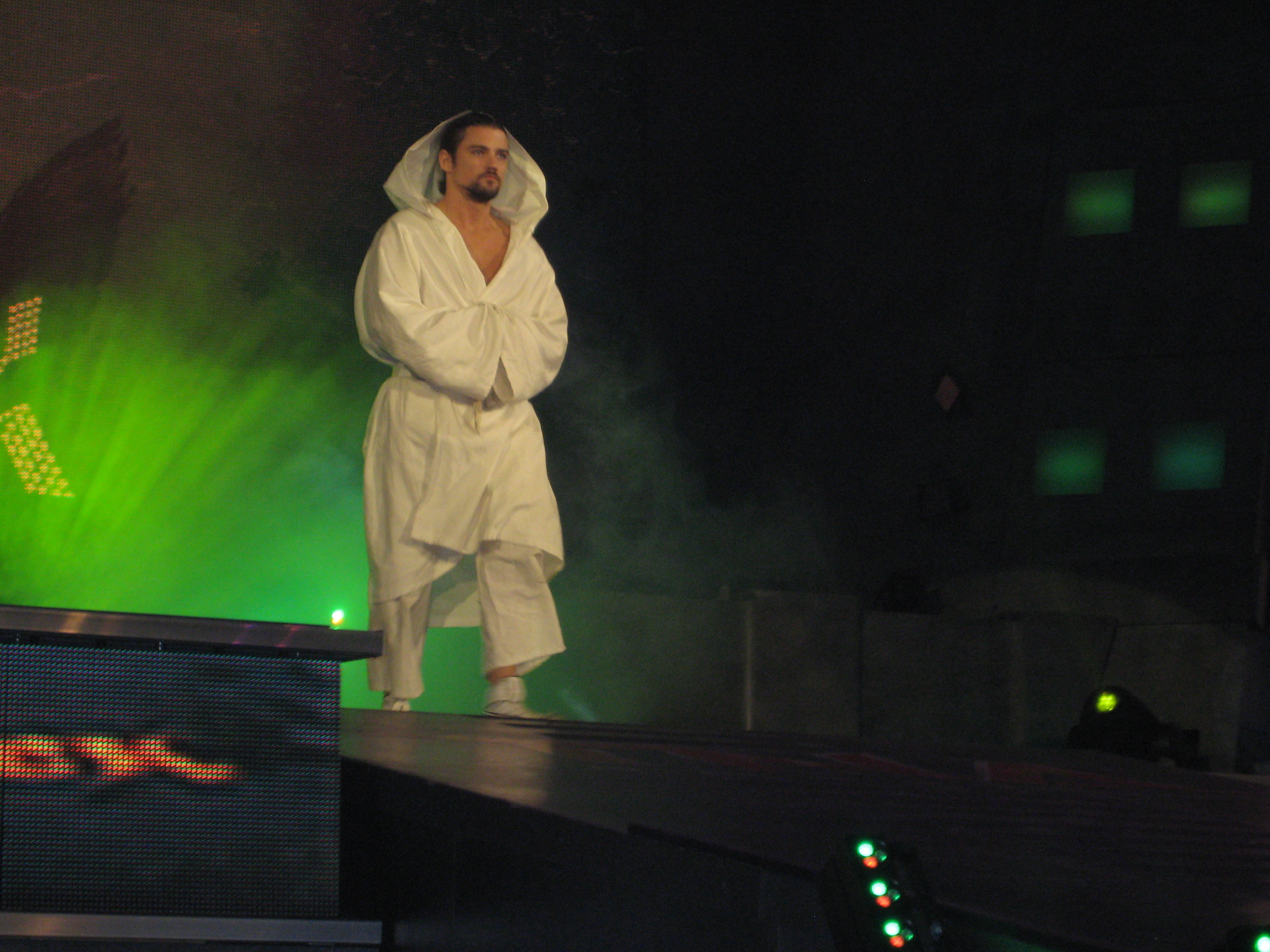
Kendrick performing under his new gimmick in September 2010.

On January 17, 2010, at Total Nonstop Action Wrestling (TNA)'s pay-per-view Genesis, Kendrick made his return to the promotion using his real name and losing to Amazing Red in a match for the TNA X Division Championship, under a similar heel gimmick to his The Brian Kendrick gimmick used in WWE. On April 7, 2010, Dixie Carter announced on her Twitter account that Kendrick had signed a new multi-year deal with the company. On the May 3, 2010, edition of TNA Impact!, Kendrick turned face by having a confrontation with his partner Douglas Williams after their match against Ink Inc. (Shannon Moore and Jesse Neal), but then Samoa Joe came out and attacked both of them. The following week, Kendrick picked up his first singles victory since returning to TNA by defeating Williams after a distraction from Kazarian. As a result of his victory, Kendrick was given a shot at Williams' X Division Championship at Slammiversary VIII, but was unable to win the title.

Kendrick received a rematch the following month at Victory Road, but was defeated again by Williams, this time in an Ultimate X submission match. On the September 2 edition of Impact!, Kendrick joined EV 2.0, a stable consisting of former Extreme Championship Wrestling performers. At Bound for Glory Kendrick interfered in a Lethal Lockdown match between EV 2.0 and Fortune and helped his team win the match between the two factions. At Turning Point EV 2.0 faced Fortune in a ten-man tag team match, where each member of EV 2.0 put their TNA careers on the line. Kendrick was taken out of the match immediately, after being attacked by Douglas Williams. In the end, EV 2.0 lost the match and Sabu was released from TNA.

After the dissolution of EV 2.0, Kendrick spent months wrestling mainly house show matches, before returning to PPV on April 17, 2011, at Lockdown, where he wrestled in an eight-man X Division number one contender's Xscape match, where he outlasted six other men, before losing to Max Buck. On the edition of May 5 of Impact!, Kendrick came together with Amazing Red and Generation Me to battle for X Division's future, after the legitimate firing of Jay Lethal. On June 12 at Slammiversary IX, Kendrick failed in his attempt to win the X Division Championship from Abyss in a three-way match with Kazarian. On July 10 at Destination X, Kendrick defeated Abyss to win the TNA X Division Championship for the first time. On the edition of July 21 of Impact Wrestling, Kendrick made his first successful defense of the X Division Championship by defeating Alex Shelley, following outside interference from Austin Aries. The following week Kendrick successfully defended the title against Abyss in an Ultimate X match to end the feud.

On August 7, 2011, at Hardcore Justice, Kendrick successfully defended the title against Alex Shelley and Austin Aries in a three-way match. On September 11 at No Surrender, Kendrick lost the X Division Championship. On the September 29 edition of Impact Wrestling, Kendrick won a five-man ladder match to earn a rematch with Aries. On the October 6 episode of Impact Wrestling, Kendrick was attacked by Kid Kash for disrespect on Kash. On October 16 at Bound for Glory, Kendrick failed in his attempt to regain the X Division Championship from Austin Aries, this was Kendrick's last TNA pay-per-view appearance. On the November 17 episode of Impact Wrestling, Kendrick teamed up with Jesse Sorensen to help defeat Austin Aries and Kid Kash in a tag team match, this was Kendrick's last appearance in TNA. After three months of inactivity, TNA announced that Kendrick was released from his TNA contract on February 27, 2012.

=== New Japan Pro-Wrestling (2011–2013) ===
On June 18, 2011, at Dominion 6.18, Kendrick made a surprise debut for New Japan Pro-Wrestling in Osaka, teaming with Gedo and Jado in a six-man tag team match, where they defeated Jushin Thunder Liger, Kushida and Tiger Mask, when Kendrick pinned Kushida with the Sliced Bread #2. Three days later Kendrick, Gedo and Jado were eliminated from the J Sports Crown Openweight 6 Man Tag Tournament in the first round by the team of IWGP Heavyweight Champion Hiroshi Tanahashi, Kushida and Máscara Dorada. The two matches built to a singles match between Kendrick and Kushida on June 23, where Kushida managed to pick up the win. During his time in New Japan, Kendrick became an associate member of Chaos and competes for Chaos whenever he has toured New Japan.

On May 11, 2012, New Japan announced that Kendrick would return to the promotion to take part in the 2012 Best of the Super Juniors tournament as Davey Richards' replacement. In the round-robin stage of the tournament, which ran from May 27 to June 9, Kendrick won five out of his eight matches, but a loss to Ryusuke Taguchi in his final round-robin match caused him to narrowly miss advancing to the semifinals of the tournament. Kendrick returned to New Japan on October 21, when he and Low Ki entered the 2012 Super Jr. Tag Tournament as "Chaos World Wrestling Warriors". However, the team was eliminated from the tournament in the first round by Apollo 55 (Prince Devitt and Ryusuke Taguchi).

In May 2013, Kendrick returned to participate in the 2013 Best of the Super Juniors, where he managed to win four out of his eight matches, failing to qualify for the semifinals. Kendrick returned to NJPW on October 25 to take part in the 2013 Super Jr. Tag Tournament, where he teamed with Beretta. They were, however, eliminated in their first round match by The Young Bucks, following a pre-match assault by Bullet Club. Kendrick teamed with various Chaos stablemates in midcard six-man and eight-man tag team matches for the rest of the tour, which lasted until November 6.

=== Brian Kendrick's Wrestling Pro Wrestling (2013–present) ===
In 2013, Kendrick founded his own professional wrestling promotion, called Brian Kendrick's Wrestling Pro Wrestling, in Bell Gardens, California. Wrestling Pro Wrestling currently has live streaming event on Twitch TV monthly. The promotion ran shows pretty regularly until 2018, when they only ran two shows. Both shows took place in Los Angeles rather than Bell Gardens and South Gate, where his previous shows had taken place.

=== Second return to WWE (2014–2023) ===
==== Trainer (2014–2016) ====
On December 11, 2014, Kendrick was backstage at NXT TakeOver: R Evolution as he was reportedly trying out for a trainer role at the WWE Performance Center. Kendrick made his televised return on the February 25, 2015, episode of NXT, losing to Finn Bálor. Kendrick then began working as a trainer for WWE and was tasked in training Eva Marie and Tough Enough Season 6 contestants Daria Berenato and Mada Abdelhamid. Kendrick appeared on Season 4 of Total Divas as a recurring character.

==== Cruiserweight Champion (2016–2017) ====
On June 13, 2016, Kendrick was announced as a participant in WWE's upcoming Cruiserweight Classic tournament. The tournament began on June 23, with Kendrick defeating Raul Mendoza in the first round match. On July 14, Kendrick defeated Tony Nese in the second round match. On August 26, Kendrick was eliminated from the tournament in the quarterfinals by Kota Ibushi, with his performance moving color commentator Daniel Bryan to tears and drawing an ovation from the live crowd. Kendrick and Bryan would later embrace each other in the ring.

On the August 22 episode of Raw, Kendrick was announced as part of the upcoming cruiserweight division. On the September 19 episode of Raw, Kendrick made his official main roster return, winning a number one contender's fatal four-way match against Cedric Alexander, Gran Metalik and Rich Swann for the WWE Cruiserweight Championship. At Clash of Champions, Kendrick failed to win the title from TJ Perkins. After the match, Kendrick embraced Perkins, but attacked him with a headbutt afterwards, re-establishing himself as a heel in the process. The next night on Raw, Kendrick challenged Perkins to another match. At Hell in a Cell on October 30, Kendrick defeated Perkins to win the Cruiserweight Championship, after faking an injury. At Survivor Series in an interpromotional match, Kendrick retained the title against SmackDown brand's Kalisto, winning by disqualification. On the premiere episode of 205 Live on November 29, Kendrick lost the title to Rich Swann, ending his reign at 30 days. The following week on 205 Live, Kendrick lost to Swann in a rematch for the title. At Roadblock: End of the Line, Kendrick again failed to regain the title in a triple threat match also involving TJ Perkins.

==== 205 Live (2017–2020) ====
In 2017, he developed a gimmick by offering to teaching lessons to the new Akira Tozawa, who declined. This eventually led to a street fight on the May 23, 2017, episode of 205 Live, in which Tozawa defeated Kendrick. Kendrick then began a feud with Jack Gallagher, with Kendrick impersonating and mocking Gallagher after the latter's matches. The feud ended on the edition August 29 edition of 205 Live, when Kendrick defeated Gallagher by referee stoppage in a no disqualification match, which led to Gallagher turning heel and the two regularly competing as a tag team on 205 Live, having notable matches against Kalisto and Gran Metalik.

On the December 25, 2017, episode of Raw, Kendrick suffered an injury during a match against Hideo Itami, after Itami performed a GTS on Kendrick. After going to a local medical facility, it was revealed that Kendrick suffered a fracture to his orbital bone and nasal bridge and would be out of action for two months. Kendrick returned on the April 17, 2018, edition of 205 Live, teaming with Gallagher to defeat two local competitors. On the October 3 episode of 205 Live, Kendrick was attacked by his allies Gallagher and Gulak during one of Gulak's PowerPoint presentations, with Gulak calling Kendrick the "weakest link" in the group, turning Kendrick face again. On October 17 episode of 205 Live, Kendrick saved his former rival Akira Tozawa from a post-match attack by Gulak and Gallagher. On the October 30 episode of 205 Live, Kendrick defeated Gallagher after Tozawa prevented the interference of Gulak. They two sides went on to trade victories over the next few weeks. On the December 19, 2018, episode of 205 Live, Kendrick returned to his old clean shaven look and blonde hair as he and Tozawa defeated Gulak and Gallagher in a Street Fight match to end the feud. On the February 26 episode of 205 Live, Kendrick was defeated by Drew Gulak in the first round of the tournament to decide the number one contender for the Cruiserweight Championship at WrestleMania 35.

Following this, Kendrick would team with Akira Tozawa regularly while also managing him during his chase for the Cruiserweight Championship. In August, Kendrick and Tozawa began a feud with Jack Gallagher after Kendrick accidentally knocked Gallagher's foot off the rope during a match with Tozawa, costing him the match. On the September 10 episode of 205 Live, Kendrick and Tozawa faced Gallagher and his mystery partner Kushida in a losing effort. The following week, Kendrick would face Gallagher, where he lost by disqualification after assaulting Gallagher with a kendo stick. After Tozawa confronted him, Kendrick would proceed to assault him with the kendo stick, thus turning heel again. On November 15, Kendrick announced on Twitter that he would be taking an indefinite hiatus from 205 Live. He returned on the January 3 episode of 205 Live where he cost Danny Burch his match against Ariya Daivari and proceeded to attack him afterwards. On the January 21 episode of 205 Live, Kendrick defeated Danny Burch with the help of Daivari.

During January and February 2020, Kendrick wrestled two televised matches for NXT UK, losing to Travis Banks in his first and then losing to A-Kid in his second. After a brief hiatus due to the COVID-19 pandemic, Kendrick made his return on the August 28 episode of 205 Live where he defeated Tehuti Miles. After the match, he shook hands with Miles thus turning face in the process. Kendrick would continue wrestling on 205 Live in the coming months losing to the likes of Ashante "Thee" Adonis (Tahuti Miles), Isaiah "Swerve" Scott and Mansoor. On the October 30 episode of 205 Live, Kendrick would team with Mansoor to defeat Ever-Rise.

==== Backstage producer (2020–2023) ====
On March 31, 2021, in a video released on the WWE Performance Center's YouTube channel entitled "Brian Kendrick: Life After Wrestling", Kendrick announced that his match on October 30, 2020, would be his semi-retirement match as he would be transitioning to a backstage producer role and that he would only wrestle part-time. On the December 14 episode of NXT 2.0, Kendrick was involved in an angle where he was thrown down a flight of stairs by Harland after trying to escort him out of the arena. On the December 21 episode of NXT 2.0, Kendrick announced that he had resigned as a coach and would make his in-ring return against Harland. However, the match never took place as scheduled and on January 25, 2022, it was reported that Kendrick had asked for his release from the company, which was granted six days later on February 1.

In November 2022, he briefly returned to produce Ronda Rousey's match at Survivor Series WarGames with Rousey having specifically requested he produce her match. He made another brief return on May 6, 2023, in which he co-produced Bad Bunny's match at Backlash. He was requested to do so as he was the one who had produced Bunny's match at Wrestlemania 37 and as such Bunny was used to working with him.

=== Cancelled All Elite Wrestling appearance (2022) ===
On the same day he was granted his WWE release on February 1, 2022, it was announced that Kendrick would make his All Elite Wrestling (AEW) debut on the February 2 episode of AEW Dynamite, where he would face Jon Moxley. The match was pulled from the card, however, when Tony Khan was made aware of controversial comments made by Kendrick in the past. Kendrick would be released from AEW in May 2022, never having made his debut.

== Conspiracy theory controversy ==
In 2011, Kendrick told the conspiracy theory website Truth is Scary that he believed the September 11 attacks were faked with holograms and that the killing of Osama bin Laden never happened. In 2013, a Highspots Wrestling Network video interview titled Brian Kendrick Presents: The Kendrick Theory featured him discussing his belief that the Sandy Hook Elementary School shooting was faked and that Holocaust gas chambers were used for delousing rather than murder, as well as repeating a false claim that the Red Cross had once admitted that "only 250,000 Jews were killed" during the Holocaust and that the number was exaggerated in order to justify the creation of Israel.

Kendrick's comments, along with additional statements regarding his belief in other conspiracy theories, went largely unnoticed until they resurfaced in February 2022 and resulted in mass outrage on social media; his scheduled AEW Dynamite debut, which had been announced the previous day, was cancelled. He tweeted in response, "I apologize for all the hurt and embarrassment [sic] I have caused with my words. These are not my beliefs and never were beliefs of mine, and I crossed the line. I spread the most vile comments without thinking of the damage it would cause. I will live with this regret for the rest of my life. I am truly sorry for the pain I have caused." He was released from AEW in May 2022 without ever appearing for the company. That same month, he claimed that his statements were part of an attempt to establish himself as a "villain" in order to generate bookings as a professional wrestler; he also revealed that he had begun working with The Survivor Mitzvah Project, a charity that supports elderly Holocaust survivors.

== Personal life ==
Kendrick married fellow professional wrestler Taylor Matheny in August 2008.

== Media ==
- Best of Spanky – Danger! Danger! (DVD) Ring of Honor

== Other media ==
Kendrick played the role of 'Skull' in the movie Slammed (2004). Kendrick also appeared in Season 4 of Total Divas, training Eva Marie.

== Championships and accomplishments ==
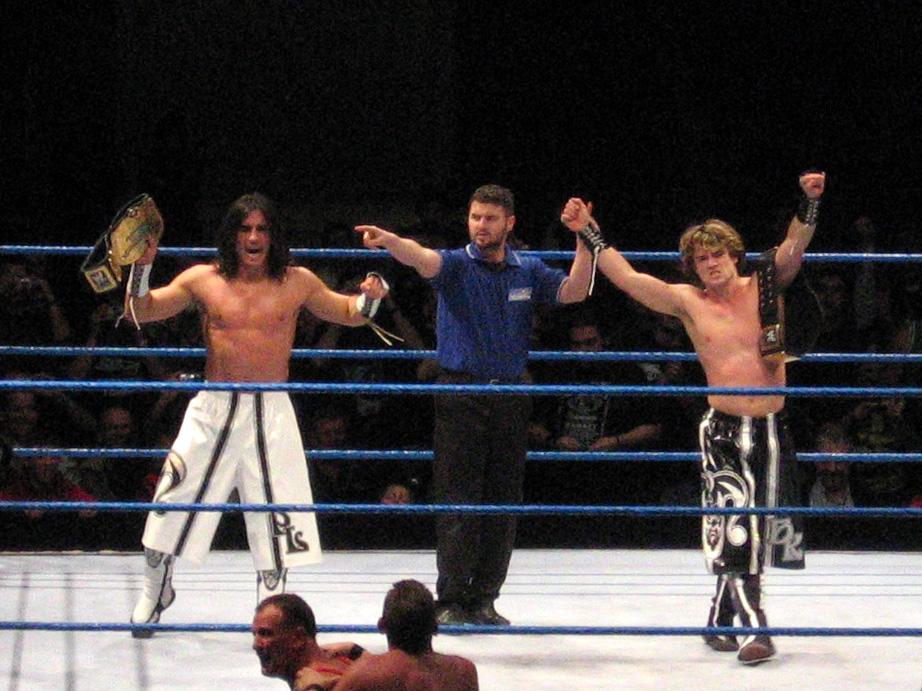
Kendrick (right) as one half of the WWE Tag Team Champions with Paul London (left), with their reign of 331 days being the second longest in history

- Battleground Championship Wrestling
  - BCW Championship (1 time, inaugural)
- British Kingdom Pro-Wrestling
  - Brit King Pro Junior Heavyweight Championship (1 time)
- DDT Pro-Wrestling
  - Ironman Heavymetalweight Championship (1 time)
- Full Force Wrestling
  - FFW Championship (1 time, current)
- Full Impact Pro
  - FIP Tag Team Championship (1 time) – with Sal Rinauro
  - Florida Rumble (2004)
- Insane Championship Wrestling
  - ICW Tag Team Championship (1 time) – with Paul London
- Los Angeles Wrestling
  - LAW Heavyweight Championship (1 time)
- LEGION
  - LEGION Maximo Championship (1 time, current)
- Northwest Pro Wrestling
  - NWP Championship (2 times, current)
- Memphis Championship Wrestling
  - MCW Southern Light Heavyweight Championship (3 times)
  - MCW Southern Tag Team Championship (1 time) – with American Dragon
- Misfits Xtreme Wrestling
  - MXW Carnage Championship (1 time)
- Pro Wrestling Illustrated
  - PWI Tag Team of the Year (2007) with Paul London
  - Ranked No. 43 of the top 500 singles wrestlers in the PWI 500 in 2003
- Pro Wrestling Power
  - PWP Tag Team Championship (1 time, current) – with JL Gold
- Pro Wrestling Zero-One / Pro Wrestling Zero1-Max
  - NWA/UPW/Zero-One International Junior Heavyweight Championship (1 time)
  - Zero1-Max United States Openweight Championship (1 time)
  - NWA International Lightweight Tag Team Championship (2 times) – with Low Ki (1) and Kaz Hayashi (1)
- Santino Bros. Wrestling
  - SBW Championship (2 times)
- Steeltown Pro Wrestling
  - SPW Provincial Championship (1 time)
- Texas Wrestling Alliance
  - TWA Television Championship (1 time)
  - TWA Tag Team Championship (1 time) – with American Dragon
- Total Nonstop Action Wrestling
  - TNA X Division Championship (1 time)
- Venom Pro Wrestling
  - VPW Rebel 24/7 Championship (1 time)
- World Wrestling Entertainment/WWE
  - WWE Cruiserweight Championship (1 time)
  - WWE Tag Team Championship (1 time) – with Paul London
  - World Tag Team Championship (1 time) – with Paul London
