= MCW Southern Light Heavyweight Championship =

Professional wrestling championship

Details
- Promotion: Memphis Championship Wrestling
- Date established: June 21, 2000
- Date retired: May 11, 2001
Statistics
- First champion(s): The Fabulous Rocke
- Final champion(s): Spanky
- Most reigns: Spanky (3 reigns)
- Longest reign: Spanky (99 days)
- Shortest reign: Al Keeholic (17 days)

The MCW Southern Light Heavyweight Championship was the title for lighter wrestlers in the Memphis Championship Wrestling professional wrestling promotion. It was rather short-lived, lasting from 2000 to 2001.

== Title history ==
Key
No.	Overall reign number
Reign	Reign number for the specific champion
Days	Number of days held

No.	Champion	Championship change			Reign statistics		Notes	Ref.
No.	Champion	Date	Event	Location	Reign	Days	Notes	Ref.
1	The Fabulous Rocker	June 21, 2000		Memphis, Tennessee	1	35	Defeated Spanky in a tournament final to become the first champion.	
2	Al Keeholic	July 26, 2000		Memphis, Tennessee	1	17	Defeated The Fabulous Rocker and Spanky in a three-way match.	
3	American Dragon	August 12, 2000		Jackson, Mississippi	1	41		
4	Spanky	September 22, 2000		Vicksburg, Mississippi	1	99		
5	Title held up after a match against Derrick King on 2000-12-30 in Memphis, Tennessee.							
6	Spanky	January 6, 2001		Bogota, Tennessee	2	91	Defeated Derrick King in a rematch.	
7	Tyler Gates	April 7, 2001			1	34		
8	Spanky	May 11, 2001		Coldwater, Mississippi	3	21		
Title stripped on 2001-06-01 in Marmaduke, Arkansas, and abandoned.

== Combined reigns ==
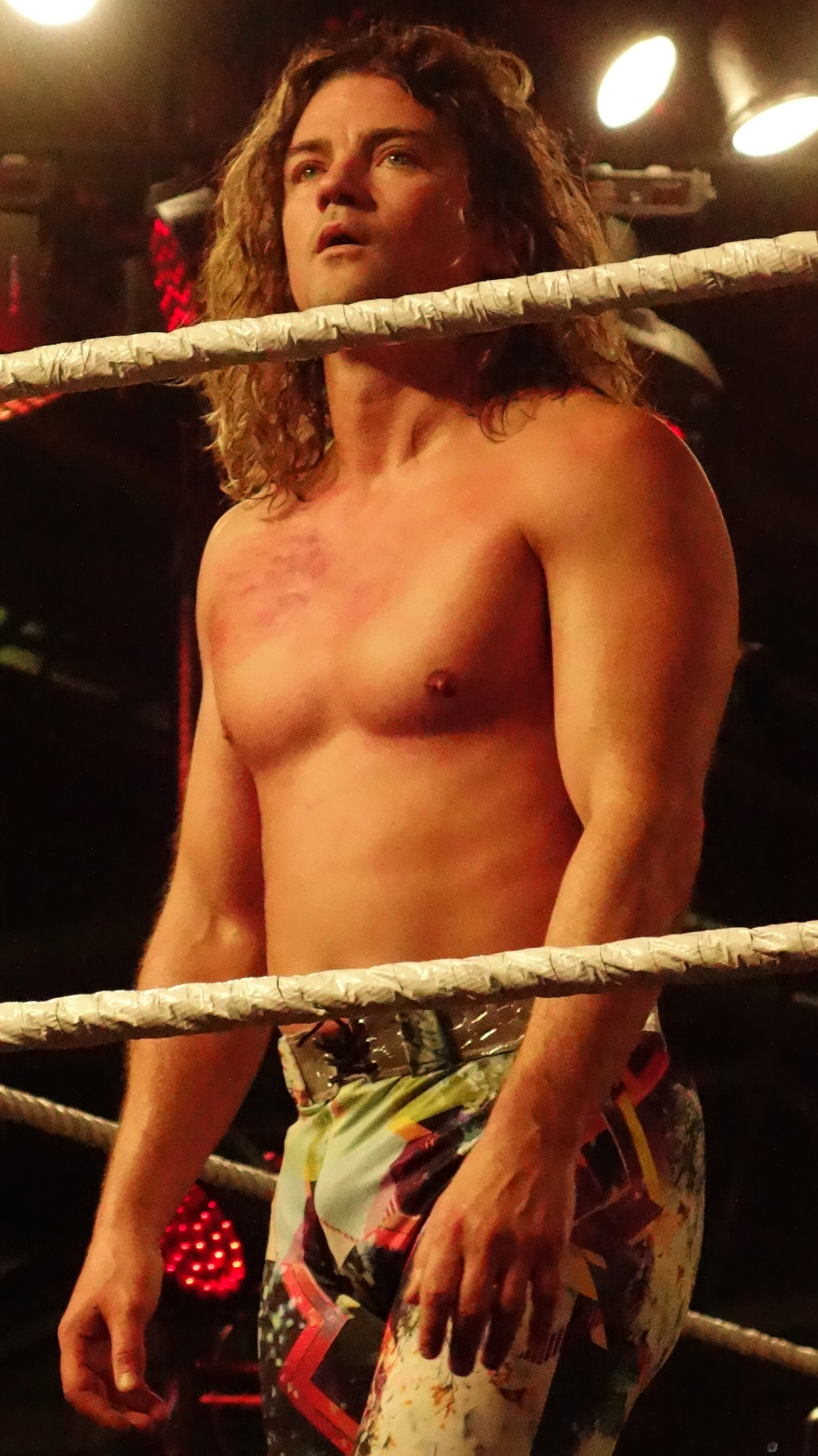
Record three-time, longest reign at 99 days and longest combined reigns at 211 days champion Spanky

Rank	Wrestler	No. of reigns	Combined days
1	Spanky	3	211
2	American Dragon	1	41
3	The Fabulous Rocker	1	35
4	Tyler Gates	1	34
5	Al Keeholic	1	17

== See also ==
- Memphis Championship Wrestling
