= DEAN~!!! 3 =

2025 Ring of Honor professional wrestling event

- Promotional poster
- Promotion(s): Ring of Honor; ACTION Wrestling
- Date: September 6, 2025 (aired September 11, 2025)
- City: Philadelphia, Pennsylvania
- Venue: 2300 Arena

Ring of Honor livestreaming event chronology
← Previous; Death Before Dishonor	Next → Final Battle

ACTION Wrestling event chronology
← Previous; Retaliation	Next → It's All In The Game

DEAN~!!! event chronology
← Previous; DEAN~!!! 2	Next → TBD

DEAN~!!! 3, also stylized as D3AN~!!!, was a professional wrestling livestreaming event co-promoted by Ring of Honor and ACTION Wrestling. The event took place on September 6, 2025 at the 2300 Arena in Philadelphia, Pennsylvania and aired on tape delay on Honor Club on September 11, 2025.

== Production ==
Other on-screen personnel
Role:	Name:
Commentators	Dylan Hales
Commentators	John Mosley

=== Background ===
On April 22, 2025, Tony Khan announced on the Way of the Blade podcast that AEW would co-produce two tribute shows dedicated to Dean Rasmussen, the founder of the Death Valley Driver Video Review magazine and the DVDVR forums who passed away in 2023. The shows would also be aired on Ring of Honor's YouTube channel with the first show originally being scheduled to take place Scottsdale, Arizona before Double or Nothing and the second show taking place in September at the 2300 Arena in Philadelphia, Pennsylvania.

=== Storylines ===
DEAN~!!! 3 featured professional wrestling matches that involves different wrestlers from pre-existing scripted feuds and storylines. Wrestlers portrayed villains, heroes, or less distinguishable characters in scripted events that built tension and culminated in a wrestling match or series of matches. Storylines were produced on Ring of Honor's various events and on their weekly show and on various ACTION Wrestling events.

== Results ==
No.	Results	Stipulations	Times
1	Dr. Cerebro, Hechicero, and Xeluha defeated Blue Panther, El Pantera, and Virus [2:1]	Best two out of three falls submissions only six man tag team match	19:58
2	Billie Starkz defeated Nicole Matthews by pinfall	Singles match	6:44
3	Wheeler Yuta (with Marina Shafir) defeated Matt Mako by pinfall	Singles match	11:49
4	La Faccion Ingobernable (Dralístico, Sammy Guevara, and The Beast Mortos) (with Rush) defeated Cheeseburger, Eli Isom, and Rhett Titus by pinfall	Six man tag team match	3:41
5	Demus defeated Mad Dog Connelly	Hair vs. Hair match	10:29
6	Lee Moriarty (c) defeated Josh Woods	Singles match for the ROH Pure Championship	10:13
7	Shane Taylor defeated AR Fox by pinfall	Singles match	5:55
(c) / – the champion(s) heading into the match
