= Taylor Matheny =

American retired professional wrestler (born 1979)

Personal information
- Born: Taylor Ann Matheny; May 23, 1979 (age 47) Maple Valley, Washington, U.S.
- Spouse: Brian Kendrick (m. 2008)

Professional wrestling career
- Ring name: Taylor Matheny
- Billed height: 5 ft 2 in (1.57 m)
- Billed weight: 125 lb (57 kg)
- Trained by: Al Snow; Tazz; Jacqueline Moore; Tori
- Debut: 2001
- Retired: 2003

Taylor Ann Kendrick (née Matheny; born May 23, 1979) is an American musician and retired professional wrestler who competed in North American independent promotions including Ohio Valley Wrestling, a developmental territory of World Wrestling Entertainment. She is best known, however, as a contestant on MTV's Tough Enough in 2001, making it to the finals before losing out to Nidia Guenard.

== Professional wrestling career ==
=== World Wrestling Federation (2001) ===
Growing up in Maple Valley, Washington, she became interested in professional wrestling during the late 1990s and, seeing a commercial for WWE Tough Enough during Monday Night Raw, auditioned for the reality television series. Originally one of thirteen contestants, she eventually reached the finals with Chris Nowinski, Maven Huffman, Josh Mathews and Nidia Guenard.

=== Independent circuit (2001–2003) ===
In November 2001, soon after the finale of the show, Matheny made her professional wrestling debut in New England's World Wrestling Alliance in November 2001. Within a short time, she appeared on the independent wrestling circuit across the United States.

During the next year, Matheny appeared in numerous independent promotions. She defeated Frost in an intergender match at Alaska Superslam II in Anchorage on February 17. While competing for New Era Wrestling, she teamed with Rory Fox to defeat Gage Octane and Vixen in a mixed tag team match on April 6. She also faced April Hunter at a Universal Wrestling Federation event in Oxford, Pennsylvania on April 19, 2006; this was one of two matches during which Hunter made her professional debut.

After making an appearance in Liberty All-Star Wrestling defeating Danny Rose and Allison Danger in a mixed tag team match on April 20, Matheny began competing for the Nova Scotia-based Mainstream Wrestling. She defeated Kyle Kruze in a series of intergender matches and teamed with Lincoln Steen to defeat Flexx Falcone and Morgan Storm in mixed tag team matches during late April. She defeated Morgan Storm in two subsequent "Ladies" matches on April 28 and 29, 2002.

After wrestling against Allison Danger at Jersey All Pro Wrestling's Memorial Day Massacre supercard on May 26, Matheny accepted an invitation by the Japanese female wrestling promotion ARSION for a three and a half month tour in Japan. During the tour, she teamed with Bionic J and Cheerleader Melissa in a six-woman tag team match to defeat Mariko Yoshida, Kaori Yoneyama and Baby A on June 23. She also faced Baby A and Rie Tamada in singles matches before losing to Ai Fujita in a match for the WWWA Super Lightweight Championship on August 25, 2002.

After facing Rena Takase, Mika Nishio and MARU in a six-woman tag team match with Bionic J and Cheerleader Melissa on September 12, Matheny returned to the United States. Inactive during late 2002, she briefly feuded with Cheerleader Melissa in Live Action Wrestling in January 2003. Later that month, she appeared at a LAW event with B.G. James, Disco Inferno, Norman Smiley, Buff Bagwell and The Road Warriors.

Although scheduled to debut in the Carolina Wrestling Federation at the BattleCade III supercard on December 28, Matheny canceled her appearance, and by the latter part of 2003, she became tired of the wrestling business and retired. However, on September 2, 2005, she made a surprise appearance with her boyfriend Brian Kendrick at a show for Full Impact Pro.

Matheny was, at last word, pursuing a career as a Hollywood make-up artist, working on the 2005 film The Last Will.

Taylor Matheny is now involved in her husband Brian Kendrick's Wrestling Pro Wrestling which has monthly wrestling event in southern California that streams on Twitch. You can see her as a character named "Mean Janine" in the show.

== Personal life ==
Matheny has been married to Brian Kendrick since August 2008. She made a brief appearance with her husband on an episode of Total Divas as he trained Eva Marie.
