= CMLL vs. AEW & ROH =

2025 professional wrestling event in Mexico City

- Official poster of the event
- Promotion(s): All Elite Wrestling (AEW); Ring of Honor (ROH); Consejo Mundial de Lucha Libre (CMLL)
- Date: June 17, 2025
- City: Mexico City, Mexico
- Venue: Arena México
- Attendance: 6,300

Special event chronology
← Previous; AEW: Summer Blockbuster; ROH: Global Wars Australia; CMLL: Azteca Lucha	Next → ROH: Global Wars Mexico; AEW & CMLL: Grand Slam Mexico

CMLL vs. AEW & ROH was a 2025 professional wrestling livestreaming event co-promoted by the American promotion Ring of Honor, sister promotion All Elite Wrestling and all Mexican professional wrestling company Consejo Mundial de Lucha Libre (CMLL). The event took place on June 17, 2025 at Arena México in Mexico City, Mexico. This show was aired live on CMLL's YouTube channel through their Superstar Fan subscription tier.

== Production ==
=== Storylines ===
Other on-screen personnel
Role	Name
Commentators	Alvaro Riojas
Commentators	Carlos Cabrera
Commentators	Julio Cesar Rivera
Commentators	Roberto Lopez Olvera

CMLL vs. AEW & ROH featured professional wrestling matches that involved different wrestlers from pre-existing scripted feuds and storylines. Storylines were produced on ROH's streaming program Honor Club TV, as well as on AEW's weekly television programs, Dynamite and Collision, and CMLL's various shows on their YouTube channel.

At CMLL vs. AEW & ROH Bandido will be defending his ROH World Championship against CMLL's Máscara Dorada, the two are originally from Mexico and are Mexican. The two have also been somewhat familiar with each other as a month prior before the event Máscara had an interview on facing Bandido at the event once the match was first announced and Bandido saying that he's interested in facing Máscara in the future before the event.

== Results ==
No.	Results	Stipulations	Times
1	Persephone defeated Red Velvet by pinfall	Singles match	9:49
2	Los Hermanos Chávez (Ángel de Oro and Niebla Roja) (c) defeated CRU (Lio Rush and Action Andretti)	Tag team match for the CMLL World Tag Team Championship	14:36
3	Hologram (with Alex Abrahantes) defeated Neón by pinfall	Singles match	14:22
4	Atlantis Jr. defeated Josh Alexander by pinfall	Singles match	13:13
5	Último Guerrero, Averno, Gran Guerrero and Euforia defeated The Don Callis Family (Konosuke Takeshita, Kyle Fletcher, Rocky Romero and Hechicero)	Eight-man tag team match	17:11
6	Bandido (c) defeated Máscara Dorada by pinfall	Singles match for the ROH World Championship	19:31
(c) / – the champion(s) heading into the match

== See also ==
- Grand Slam Mexico
- Global Wars Mexico
- FantasticaMania Mexico
