= Global Wars Australia =

2025 Ring of Honor and All Elite Wrestling co-promoted professional wrestling event

- Promotional poster featuring various AEW and ROH wrestlers
- Promotion(s): Ring of Honor; All Elite Wrestling
- Date: February 15, 2025 (aired February 17, 2025)
- City: Brisbane, Queensland, Australia
- Venue: Brisbane Entertainment Centre
- Attendance: 13,000

Global Wars chronology
← Previous; Espectacular	Next → Mexico

Special event chronology
← Previous; AEW: Grand Slam Australia; ROH: Chris Jericho’s Rock 'N' Wrestling Rager at Sea Cruise	Next → ROH: Prelude to Spring BreakThru; AEW: Spring BreakThru

AEW in Australia chronology chronology
← Previous; 2025	Next → 2026

Global Wars Australia was a 2025 professional wrestling livestreaming event co-promoted by the American promotion Ring of Honor and its sister promotion All Elite Wrestling (AEW). It was the 18th Global Wars event and took place on February 15, 2025, at the Brisbane Entertainment Centre in Brisbane, Queensland, Australia. The special event, which was taped the same night as AEW's Grand Slam Australia, aired on tape delay on February 17, 2025, on Honor Club. This was the first Global Wars event since 2019 as well as ROH's debut in Australia.

== Production ==
=== Background ===
Global Wars is a professional wrestling event held sporadically by the American promotion Ring of Honor (ROH) since 2012. Originally named "Border Wars" and co-produced with the Japanese promotion Pro Wrestling Noah, the event was renamed Global Wars in 2014 after ROH announced a partnership with New Japan Pro-Wrestling.

Under the new name, the event became a supershow co-produced by the two promotions. In 2019, ROH announced a three-event tour with the Mexican promotion Consejo Mundial de Lucha Libre as the new partner for the series, renamed "Global Wars Espectacular". The Global Wars Espectacular tour marked the last Global Wars event held by ROH under the ownership of Sinclair Broadcast Group.

On March 2, 2022, it was announced that Tony Khan, the principal owner of All Elite Wrestling (AEW), had purchased ROH. The two promotions operate as sister companies while under Khan's ownership; on January 5, 2025, ROH and AEW held their first co-promoted event, Wrestle Dynasty in the Tokyo Dome.

On February 12, 2025, ROH announced that it would revive the "Global Wars" name for a co-promoted event with AEW, held at the Brisbane Entertainment Centre in Brisbane, Queensland, Australia on February 15. The event, which was held on the same night and in the same venue as AEW's Grand Slam Australia, marked ROH's debut in Australia. The show aired on tape delay on February 17 on Honor Club.

=== Storylines ===
Other on-screen personnel
Role:	Name:
Commentators	Ian Riccaboni
Commentators	Caprice Coleman

Global Wars Australia featured five professional wrestling matches that involved different wrestlers from pre-existing scripted feuds and storylines. Storylines were produced on ROH's streaming program Honor Club TV, as well as on AEW's weekly television programs, Dynamite and Collision.

== Results ==
No.	Results	Stipulations	Times
1	The Outrunners (Turbo Floyd and Truth Magnum) and Bandido defeated The Learning Tree (Chris Jericho, Big Bill, and Bryan Keith) by pinfall	Trios match	14:11
2	Lee Moriarty (c) defeated Robbie Eagles by pinfall	Pure Wrestling Rules match for the ROH Pure Championship	10:27
3	Mark Davis defeated Tommy Knight by pinfall	Singles match	5:21
4	The Sons of Texas (Dustin Rhodes and Sammy Guevara) (c) defeated MxM Collection (Mason Madden and Mansoor) by pinfall	Tag team match for the ROH World Tag Team Championship	12:53
5	Athena (c) defeated Alex Windsor by pinfall	Singles match for the ROH Women's World Championship	11:51
(c) / – the champion(s) heading into the match

== See also ==
- Wrestle Dynasty
- Sea Cruise (2025)
- Global Wars
