= ROH World Championship =

Men's professional wrestling championship

- The title belt used since 2023

Details
- Promotion: ROH
- Date established: June 22, 2002
- Current champion: Bandido
- Date won: April 6, 2025

Other names
- ROH Championship (2002–2003); Undisputed ROH World Championship (2022)
Statistics
- First champion: Low Ki
- Most reigns: Adam Cole (3 reigns)
- Longest reign: Samoa Joe (645 days)
- Shortest reign: Kyle O'Reilly (33 days)
- Oldest champion: Chris Jericho (53 years, 349 days)
- Youngest champion: Low Ki (22 years, 324 days)
- Heaviest champion: Takeshi Morishima (320 lb (150 kg))
- Lightest champion: Jonathan Gresham (161 lb (73 kg))

The ROH World Championship is a men's professional wrestling world championship created and promoted by the American promotion Ring of Honor (ROH). It is considered the most prestigious title in the promotion. In addition to being in ROH, the championship is also occasionally defended on All Elite Wrestling's (AEW) programs, as AEW and ROH are both owned by Tony Khan. The current champion is Bandido, who is in his second reign. He won the title by defeating Chris Jericho in a Title vs. Mask match at AEW Dynasty on April 6, 2025.

Established on June 22, 2002, the inaugural champion was Low Ki. When the title is jointly held with the AEW Continental Championship and the Strong Openweight Championship of the American branch of partner promotion New Japan Pro-Wrestling, the three titles together make up the American Triple Crown Championship, also referred to as the Continental Crown; as of March 2024, this has only happened once.

== History ==
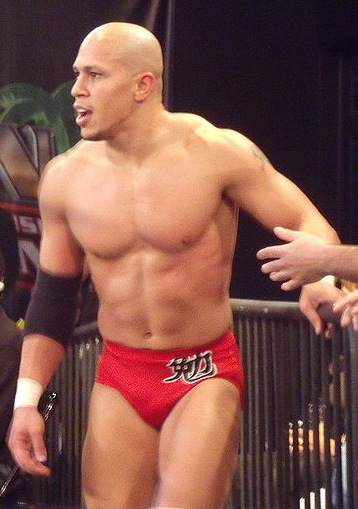
Inaugural champion Low Ki

Low Ki defeated Spanky, Christopher Daniels, and Doug Williams in a 60-minute Iron Man match to become the inaugural ROH Champion at Crowning a Champion on July 27, 2002 after holding its first tournament to crown the inaugural champion on June 22, 2002.

Samoa Joe had the longest title reign to date when he held the belt for 21 months and four days. During his reign, ROH held a cross-promotional show with Frontier Wrestling Alliance in the United Kingdom on May 17, 2003, called Frontiers of Honor. At that show, Joe turned the title into the ROH World Championship when he defended it against The Zebra Kid. Since then the title has been defended in Germany, Canada, Switzerland, Austria, Mexico, Japan, Ireland, Italy, and Spain.

On August 12, 2006, the ROH Pure Championship was unified with the ROH World Championship after the ROH Pure Champion Nigel McGuinness lost to the ROH World Champion Bryan Danielson in Liverpool, England in a title unification match. The match was contested under pure wrestling rules, with the stipulation that both championships could be lost by disqualification or count out.

On July 3, 2013, the ROH World Championship has declared vacant for the first time since its inception, when ROH Match Maker Nigel McGuinness stripped then-champion Jay Briscoe of the title after he was sidelined with a storyline injury and would be unable to compete for the foreseeable future.

On January 4, 2016 the ROH World Championship was defended in Japan for the first time ever at Wrestle Kingdom 10, as champion Jay Lethal defended and retained the title against Michael Elgin.

In late 2021, ROH announced it would go on hiatus following Final Battle. Then-ROH World Champion Bandido was supposed to wrestle Jonathan Gresham in a championship match at Final Battle until December 9 when it was announced that Bandido had tested positive for COVID-19, thus ending his participation in the scheduled match. Jay Lethal took Bandido’s place against Gresham at Final Battle where Gresham defeated Lethal and won the vacated ROH World Championship, now represented by the original title belt. However, during ROH’s hiatus after Final Battle, Gresham and Bandido would appear in different promotions defending their respective championships; Gresham with the original belt and Bandido with the most recently designed belt. The championship was defended on cards promoted by other companies such as longtime ROH national rival Impact Wrestling, Game Changer Wrestling (GCW), the UK-based Progress Wrestling, and All Elite Wrestling (AEW). Both men even defended their respective titles with Gresham's new promotion, TERMINUS.

On January 20, 2022, it was announced that Bandido and Gresham would face each other in a championship unification match at Supercard of Honor XV, the first ROH event after the hiatus. At the event, Gresham defeated Bandido to unify the ROH World Championship. Afterwards, Gresham continued to carry the original belt while the belt carried by Bandido was shelved.

On November 11, 2023, AEW announced a tournament called the Continental Classic, with the winner becoming the first AEW Continental Champion. Eddie Kingston, who held the ROH World Championship and NJPW's Strong Openweight Championship, announced that he would be putting his championships on the line in the tournament and that the tournament's winner would be an American Triple Crown Champion (collectively referred to as the Continental Crown). At AEW's Worlds End event, Kingston defeated Jon Moxley in the Continental Classic final, retaining the ROH World and Strong Openweight championships and becoming the first Continental Crown Champion. Kingston would lose the AEW Continental Championship to Kazuchika Okada on the March 20, 2024, episode of Dynamite, thus losing his recognition as Triple Crown Champion.

On June 16, 2025, it was announced that on June 17, 2025 the ROH World Championship would be defended in Mexico as champion Bandido defends the title against Máscara Dorada at CMLL vs. AEW & ROH. During the event Bandido was successful at retaining.

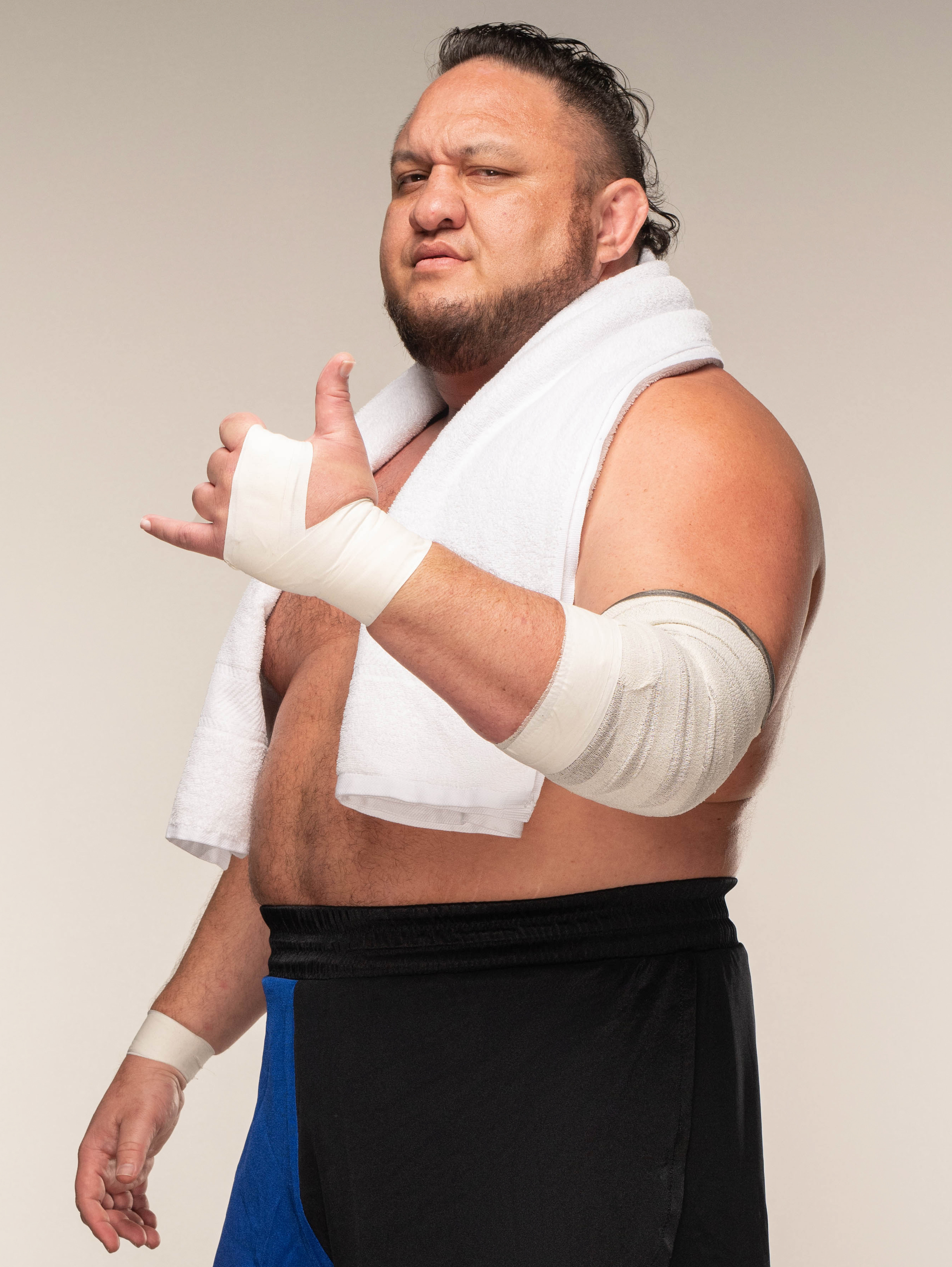
Samoa Joe has the record for the longest reign with 21 months and four days. During his reign, the championship was renamed from the ROH Championship to the ROH World Championship.

== Inaugural championship tournament (2002) ==
On June 22, 2002, ROH held the first part of a tournament to crown the inaugural ROH Champion. Sixteen wrestlers were divided into four blocks, with the winner of each block competing in a Four-Way Iron Man match on July 27, 2002 to determine the first champion.

=== Tournament bracket ===
Block A
Paul London	Pin
Spanky	9:58
Jody Fleisch	7:01
Jonny Storm	Pin

Final
Spanky	5:13
Jody Fleisch	Pin

Block B
Christopher Daniels	2:28
Scoot Andrews	Pin
AJ Styles	21:49
Jerry Lynn	Pin

Final
Christopher Daniels	15:30
AJ Styles	Pin

Block C
American Dragon	2:31
Bio-Hazard	Sub
Doug Williams	6:17
Jay Briscoe	Pin

Final
American Dragon	Pin
Doug Williams	13:17

Block D
Low Ki	3:53
Prince Nana	TKO
Amazing Red	4:20
Xavier	Pin

Final
Low Ki	11:16
Amazing Red	Pin

=== Final ===
Low Ki won the Four-Way 60-minute Iron Man match to become the inaugural champion.

Wrestler	Points
Low Ki	3
Christopher Daniels	2
Doug Williams	-1
Spanky	-1

- Due to having multiple competitors, the rules for the Iron Man match were altered to a point system where a wrestler scoring a pinfall or submission was awarded two points, while the wrestler being pinned or submitted lost one point.

== Belt designs ==
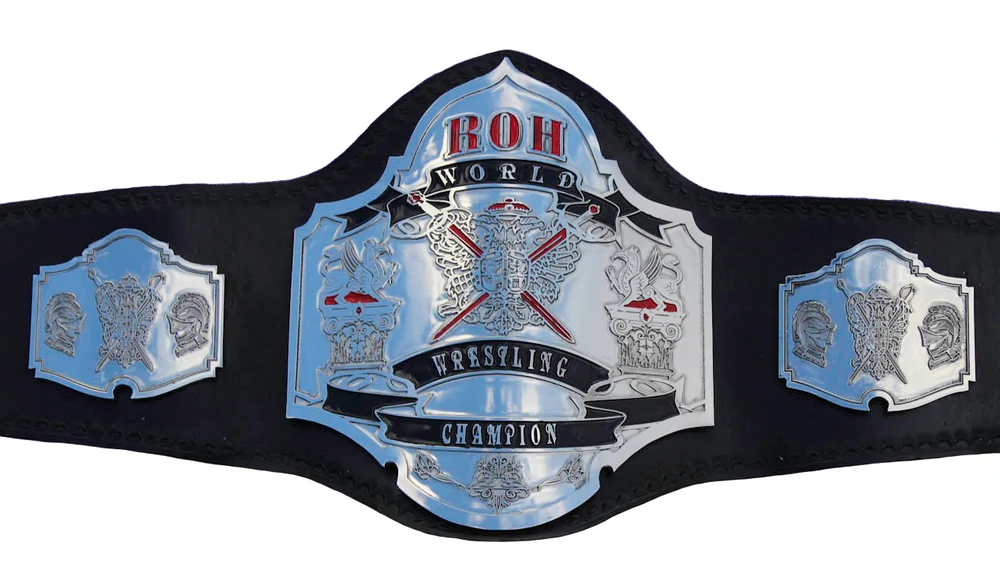
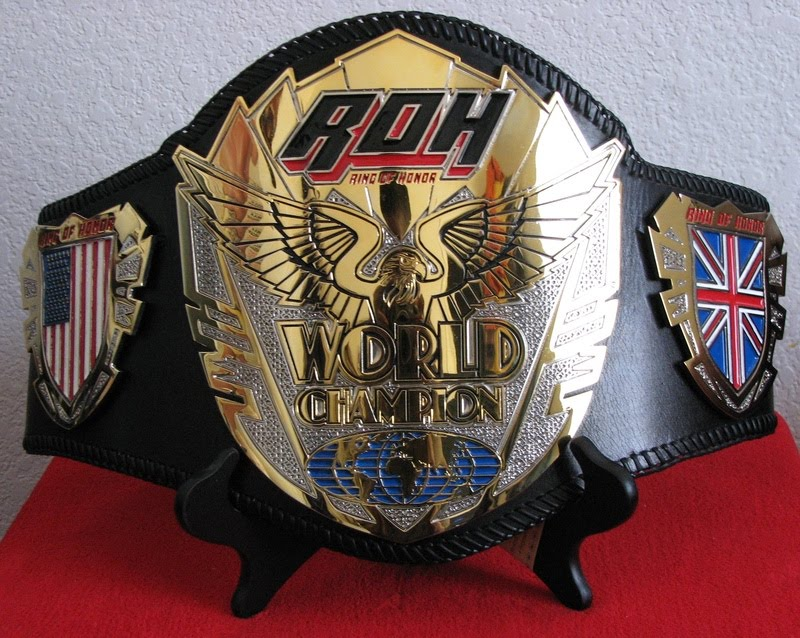
ROH World Championship belts (left-to-right): first design (2002–2004; 2004–2010; 2021–2023), second design (2004), third design (2010–2012), fifth design (2017–2023), and current (2023–present).

In 2010, the title belt, along with the ROH World Tag Team Championship belts, was redesigned. The new belt has an eagle with its wings spread over a picture of the world with an ROH logo on the top. This design also includes various flags on different countries.

In December 2012, a new design was introduced at the Final Battle iPPV.

In 2014, During the rivalry between Adam Cole and Jay Briscoe, Briscoe unveiled a custom ROH World Title belt.

In December 2017, ROH unveiled another new design for the title belt, which debuted at Final Battle.

On March 31, 2023, a new design of the championship belt was revealed on the Countdown to Supercard of Honor show, making it the sixth design in the title's history.

The current (2023) design of the ROH World Championship has black strap featuring 5 plates. The main plate is silver with 2 black banners. The top reading "WORLD" and the bottom banner reading "WRESTLING CHAMPION". The center of the plate features a globe with the current Ring of Honor logo on it. The side plates are circular with the Ring of Honor logo on the top and an engraved figure of a wrestler performing the "Jay Driller" finisher, paying tribute to former ROH World Champion and Hall of Famer, Jay Briscoe, who died in a car accident in January 2023.

When Mark Briscoe became champion, he introduced his own variant of the title, with the plates on a white & black camouflage strap.

== Reigns ==
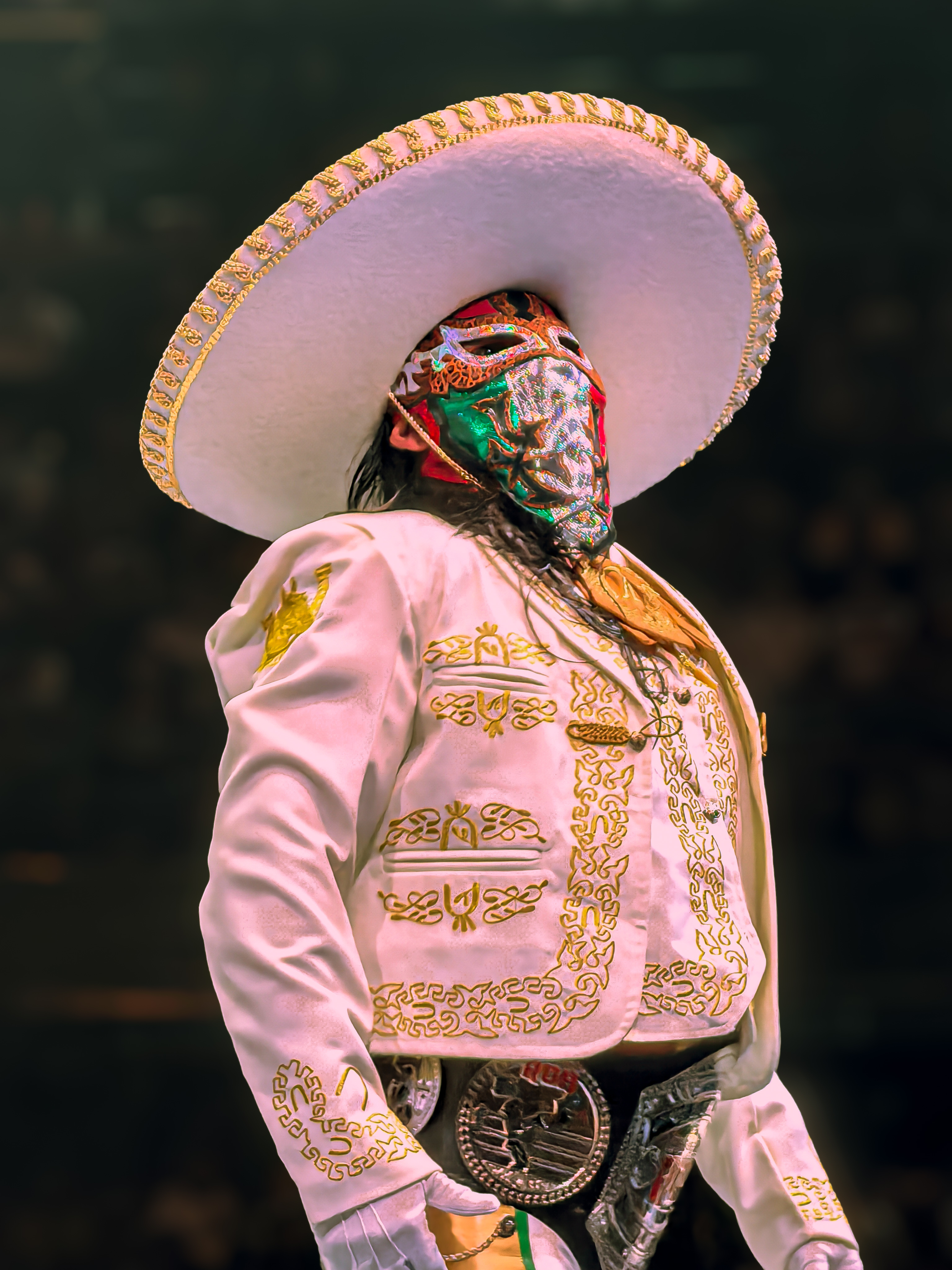
Two-time and current champion Bandido

Overall, there have been 42 ROH World Championship reigns and 33 total champions. The title has been vacated twice. The inaugural champion was Low Ki, who defeated Christopher Daniels, Spanky, and Doug Williams in a Four Way 60-minute Iron Man match at the Crowning A Champion event on July 27, 2002, to become the inaugural champion.

Adam Cole holds the record for most reigns, with three. Jay Lethal has the most defenses, with 41; Kyle O'Reilly has the fewest, with 0. At 645 days, Samoa Joe has the longest reign in the title's history; Kyle O'Reilly's reign is the shortest at 33 days.

Bandido is the current champion in his second reign. He defeated Chris Jericho in a Title vs. Mask match on April 6, 2025 in Philadelphia, Pennsylvania at Dynasty.

== See also ==
- ROH Survival of the Fittest – Professional wrestling tournament held by Ring of Honor / pay-per-view event series
