= ROH Prelude to Spring BreakThru =

2025 Ring of Honor promoted professional wrestling event

- Promotion: Ring of Honor (ROH)
- Date: April 12, 2025 to April 16, 2025 (aired April 17, 2025)
- City: Springfield, Massachusetts; Boston, Massachusetts
- Venue: MassMutual Center; MGM Music Hall at Fenway

Special event chronology
← Previous; Chris Jericho’s Rock 'N' Wrestling Rager at Sea Cruise	Next → DEAN~!!! 2

ROH Prelude to Spring BreakThru was a professional wrestling livestreaming event promoted by the American promotion Ring of Honor. This was an event and took place on April 12, 2025 to April 16, 2025 at the MassMutual Center in Springfield, Massachusetts and at the MGM Music Hall at Fenway in Boston, Massachusetts. The special event, which was taped nights before and on the same nights as AEW's Spring BreakThru, aired on tape delay on April 17, 2025 on Honor Club and YouTube.

== Production ==
=== Storylines ===
'ROH Prelude to Spring BreakThru’ featured four different professional wrestling matches that involved different wrestlers from pre-existing scripted feuds and storylines. Wrestlers were portrayed as either villains or heroes in the scripted events that built tension and culminated in a wrestling match involving.

The events main event is Nick Wayne (with Mother Wayne) vs. Michael Oku (with Amira Blande) in a Singles match.

=== Background ===
Other on-screen personnel
Role:	Name:
Commentators	Ian Riccaboni
Commentators	Caprice Coleman

ROH Prelude to Spring BreakThru is a special professional wrestling event that was held in April on Spring Break by the American promotion Ring of Honor (ROH). The event is separate from AEW Spring BreakThru that was also held in April on Spring Break.

On March 2, 2022, it was announced that Tony Khan, the principal owner of All Elite Wrestling (AEW), had purchased ROH. The two promotions operate as sister companies while under Khan's ownership; on January 5, 2025, ROH and AEW held their first co-promoted event, Wrestle Dynasty in the Tokyo Dome.

== Results ==
No.	Results	Stipulations	Times
1	Top Flight (Dante Martin & Darius Martin) (with Leila Grey) defeated The Conglomeration (Rocky Romero & Tomohiro Ishii) by pinfall	Tag team match	6:45
2	Shane Taylor (with Carlie Bravo & Shawn Dean) defeated KM by pinfall	Singles match	1:20
3	La Catalina defeated Taya Valkyrie by pinfall	Singles match Winner receives a match against Red Velvet for the ROH Women's World Television Championship	5:46
4	Nick Wayne (with Mother Wayne) defeated Michael Oku (with Amira Blande) by pinfall	Singles match	8:09

== See also ==
- Wrestle Dynasty
- Sea Cruise (2025)
- Global Wars
