= Chikara High Noon =

2011 Chikara internet pay-per-view

High Noon
- Promotional poster featuring various Chikara wrestlers
- Promotion: Chikara
- Date: November 13, 2011
- City: Philadelphia, Pennsylvania
- Venue: Asylum Arena
- Attendance: 864
- Tagline: On November 13th Someone Has a Date with Destiny!

Pay-per-view chronology
← Previous —	Next → Chikarasaurus Rex: How to Hatch a Dinosaur

High Noon was a professional wrestling internet pay-per-view (iPPV) event produced by the Chikara promotion, that took place on November 13, 2011, at the Asylum Arena in Philadelphia, Pennsylvania. The event marked Chikara's first ever live pay-per-view and it was headlined by the finals of a tournament to determine the first ever Chikara Grand Champion. The event aired on GoFightLive, with a pre-show airing live on Ustream. The event broke Chikara's attendance record, drawing 864 fans into the Asylum Arena, and drew more than 1,000 buys online, beating Ring of Honor's previous iPPV, Death Before Dishonor IX, which drew 972 buys. The event was released on DVD by Smart Mark Video on November 25, 2011.

== Background ==
High Noon featured seven professional wrestling matches involving different wrestlers from pre-existing scripted feuds, plots, and storylines that were played out on Chikara's monthly house shows and on blog entries written on the promotion's official website. Wrestlers will portray villains (rudos in Chikara) or heroes (tecnicos in Chikara) as they follow a series of events that build tension, and culminate in a wrestling match or series of matches. Chikara follows lucha libre traditions and is known for its colorful characters and gimmicks and family-friendly content.

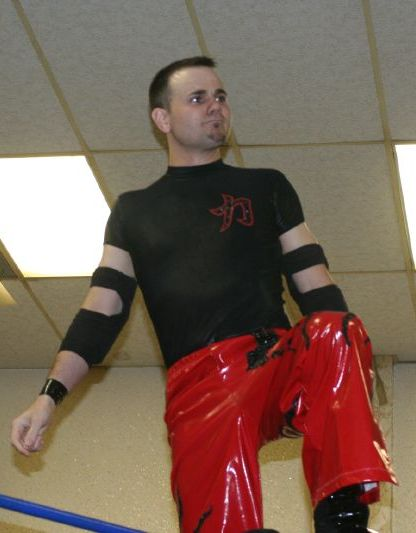
Mike Quackenbush, Chikara's founder and booker

On February 3, 2011, Chikara's new Director of Fun Wink Vavasseur announced that the promotion would be determining their first ever singles champion, nine years after the promotion was founded in 2002. The twelve participants in the championship tournament were determined by a voting process, with each member of the Chikara roster being allowed to cast one vote for any other member of the roster. On April 21 the twelve participants were announced as Amasis, Brodie Lee, Claudio Castagnoli, Eddie Kingston, Fire Ant, Hallowicked, Icarus, Jigsaw, Mike Quackenbush, Sara Del Rey, UltraMantis Black and Vin Gerard. The participants were then divided into two blocks for a round-robin tournament with the winners of each block facing each other in the finals. The tournament, named the 12 Large: Summit, after Chikara Wrestle Factory graduate Larry Sweeney, who died by suicide on April 11, ran from May 21 to October 30. Chikara founder and booker Mike Quackenbush won Block A with four wins and one loss, securing the top spot on October 7, with a win over Sara Del Rey. Chikara Wrestle Factory graduate Eddie Kingston won block B, also with four wins and a loss, securing the top spot on October 8, when Jigsaw defeated UltraMantis Black, the only man who could have tied his score. This set up a final match between the two tecnicos and longtime members of the Chikara roster. On October 28 it was announced that Kingston's idol and the man whom he had inducted into the Hardcore Hall of Fame in July 2010, Tommy Dreamer, would accompany him to his title match. On October 30, the previously undefeated Kingston was defeated in the final round-robin match of the tournament by Vin Gerard via submission. After the match Gerard hit Kingston in the knee with a steel chair, putting his spot in the finals into question. Following the event, Gerard was, in storyline, fired from Chikara and his profile removed from the promotion's official website.

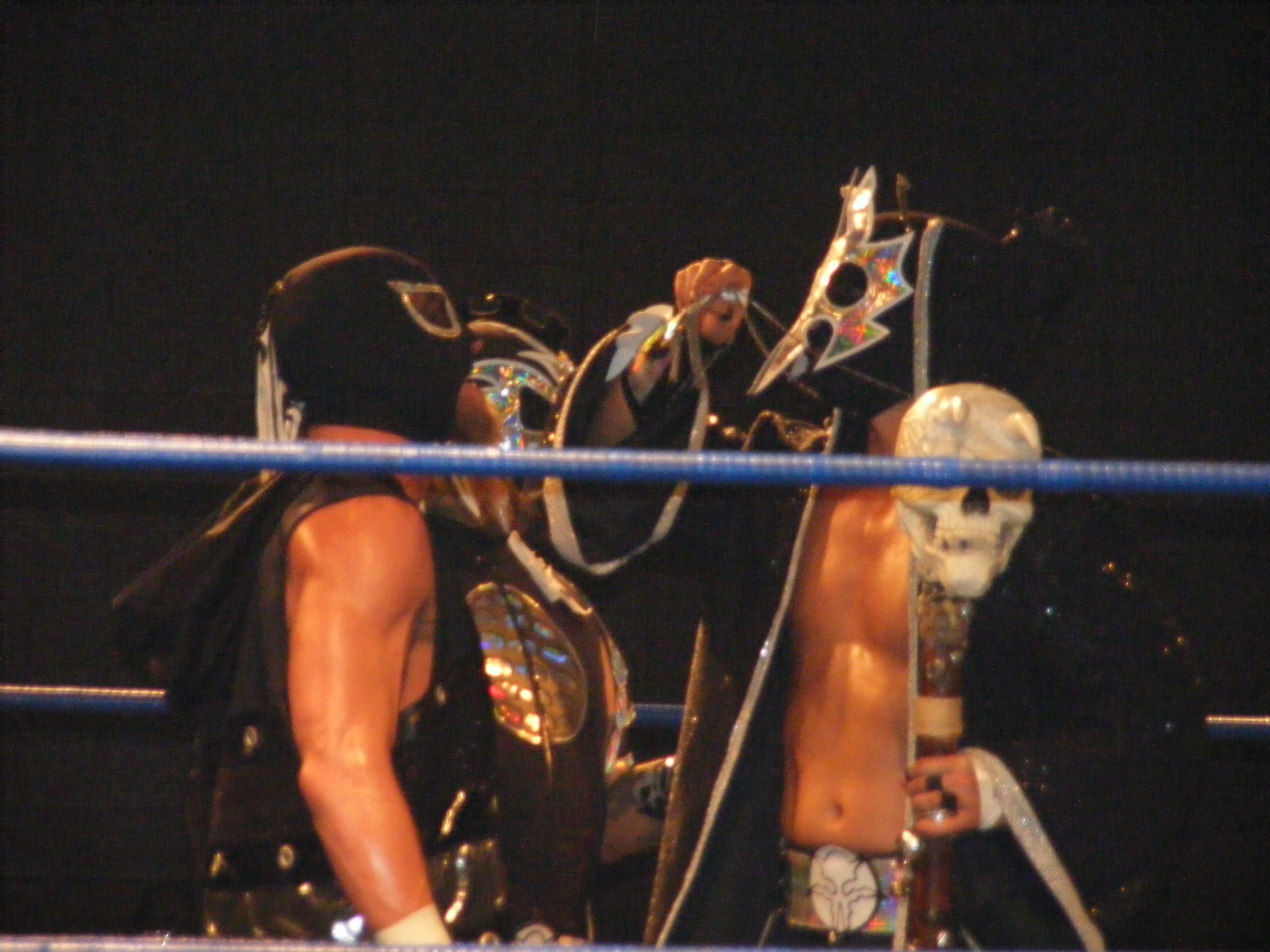
UltraMantis Black (right) controlling Delirious with the Eye of Tyr

The longest-running storyline in Chikara involves UltraMantis Black and the Eye of Tyr, which started in May 2007. The first part of the storyline involved the allegedly unbreakable wrestling hold, the Chikara Special, invented by Mike Quackenbush, and his longtime rival, Chris Hero, who surprisingly managed to finally break the hold in November 2007. It was later revealed that Hero had received the counter to the move from UltraMantis Black, who in turn had gotten it from Quackenbush's ally Shane Storm in exchange for a win to end his losing streak. UltraMantis agreed to teach the counter to Hero in exchange for him going to work for Dr. Cube at the Kaiju Big Battel promotion. In exchange for Hero's contract, Dr. Cube handed UltraMantis the Eye of Tyr, a mysterious Scandinavian artifact, which could be used to control people's minds. UltraMantis ended up using the artifact in April 2009 to brainwash Delirious into joining his Order of the Neo-Solar Temple, abandoning UltraMantis' former Dark Breed partner, Hallowicked. After months of threats from a mysterious man dressed in white, on November 22, 2009, a new top rudo stable, Bruderschaft des Kreuzes (BDK), was formed, with Ares and Claudio Castagnoli as its leaders. Ares claimed that the Eye of Tyr had been stolen from his family and managed to regain it with help from Tim Donst, who had infiltrated the Order of the Neo-Solar Temple. On February 28, 2010, Ares used the Eye of Tyr to recruit Delirious into BDK, crushing UltraMantis' dreams of winning the Chikara Campeonatos de Parejas and the King of Trios in the process.

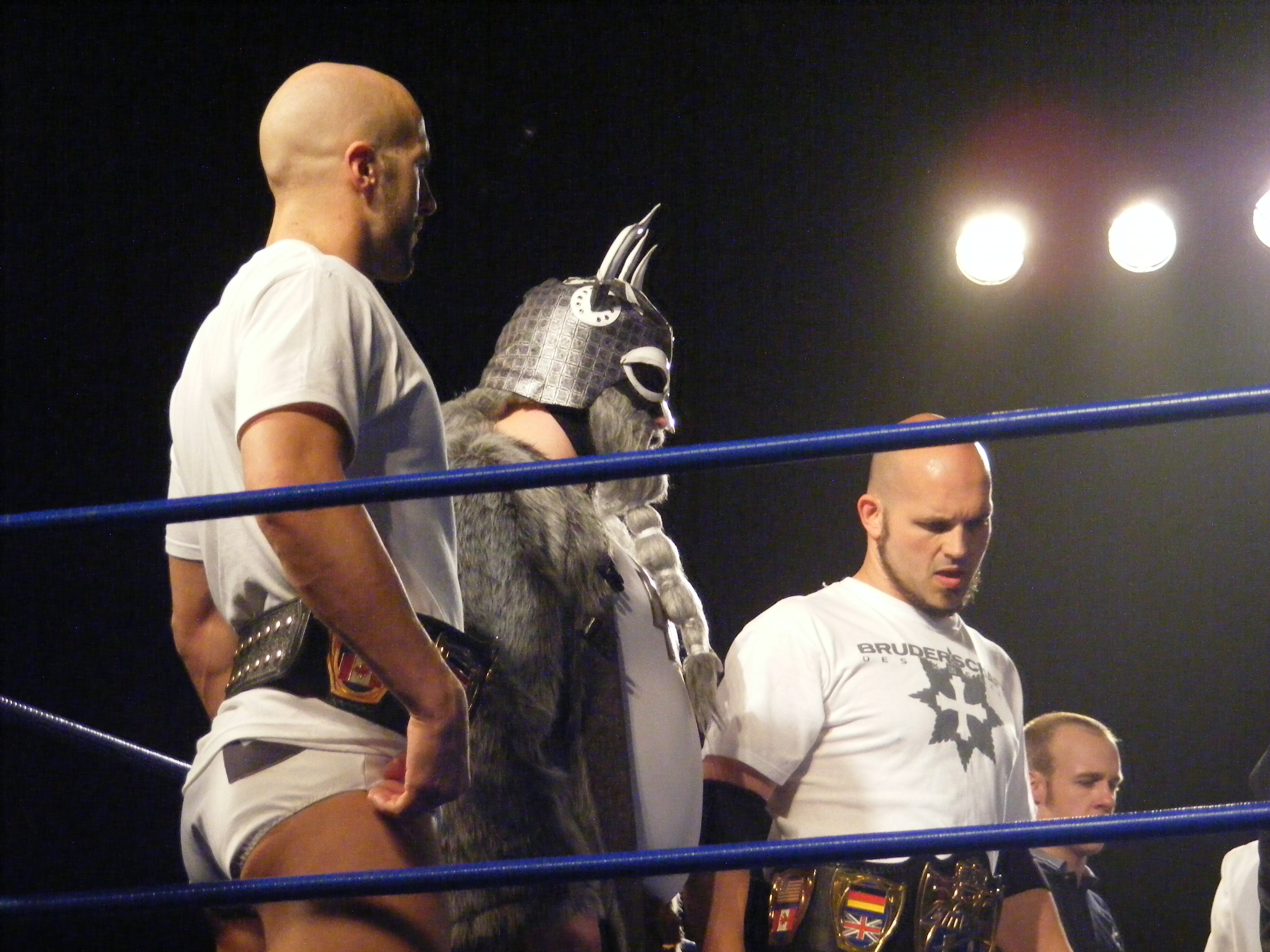
(Left to right) Bruderschaft des Kreuzes members Claudio Castagnoli, Tursas and Ares

BDK dominated early 2010, which eventually led to UltraMantis acknowledging his past mistakes, accepting responsibility for the formation of the BDK and turning tecnico, reuniting with Hallowicked and his new protégé Frightmare as the Spectral Envoy of the Final Judgment. Ares and UltraMantis had two big grudge matches on May 22 and November 21, 2010, with Ares picking up wins in both, the first with help from Delirious and the second with help from BDK stablemate Tursas. As a tecnico, UltraMantis was determined to right all his past wrongs and saw curing Delirious as his final challenge, however, in order to accomplish this goal, he needed the Eye of Tyr back. After ending his side rivalry with Sinn Bodhi, who was also after the Eye of Tyr, UltraMantis began attacking members of BDK, demanding a match with Ares. After Ares refused a match at High Noon, UltraMantis offered to put his mask on the line against the Eye of Tyr. On October 20, it was announced that the challenge had been accepted and that at High Noon, UltraMantis Black and Hallowicked would face the BDK team of Ares and Tim Donst in a No Disqualification match, where UltraMantis and Hallowicked wage their masks, Ares the Eye of Tyr and Donst his hair. Problems between Hallowicked and Donst date back to February 2011, when Donst was taking part in a series of matches, which he intended to use to prove that he was the greatest Chikara Young Lions Cup Champion in history. Having already defeated former champions Hallowicked and Jimmy Olsen, Donst's series ended in a humiliation, when he was defeated by Max Boyer in a Chikara record time of four seconds, following a pre-match attack from Hallowicked. After being pinned by Hallowicked in a six-man tag team main event on March 12, Donst retaliated on June 25, attacking Frightmare with a steel chair, sidelining him from in-ring competition. The day prior to High Noon, Hallowicked and Donst captained opposing eight-man teams in the eighth annual torneo cibernetico in Easton, Pennsylvania. The match was eventually won by Team Hallowicked's Sara Del Rey, who pinned Donst for the win.

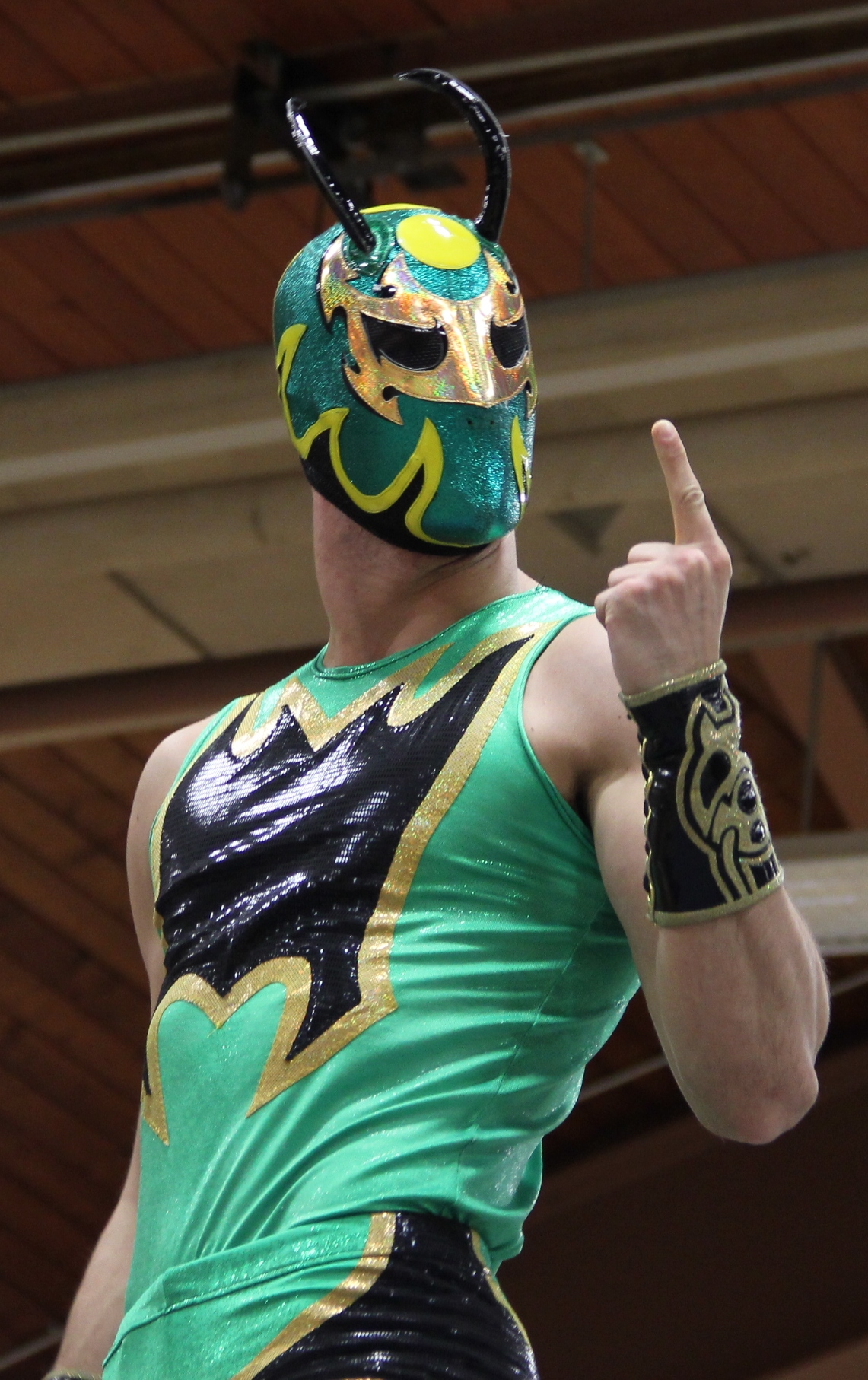
Green Ant

On August 29, 2010, The Colony's rookie member Green Ant broke his arm during a match with Keita Yano and upon his return in February 2011, Chikara started a storyline similar to that used by World Wrestling Federation with Lex Luger in 1993, where it was claimed that Green Ant had a metal plate inserted into his arm, which caused more damage, when used to strike an opponent. On April 16, during a fan conclave, Chikara held a contest to see if anyone could be able to bodyslam the 375 lb (170 kg) BDK member Tursas. Green Ant entered the contest, once again copying a storyline the WWF had used with Lex Luger and Yokozuna in 1993, but before he could complete the bodyslam, he was tripped by BDK member Jakob Hammermeier. The following day, during the second round of the 2011 King of Trios tournament, Green Ant successfully bodyslammed Tursas, before submitting Hammermeier with Luger's trademark finisher, the Torture Rack, for the win. In July Green Ant started a "Flex Express" bus tour, featured on Chikara's video podcasts, in preparation for his singles match with Tursas, again imitating a similar tour Luger had done in 1993. One of the episodes even featured a cameo from Luger himself. The match took place on July 30 and saw Tursas defeat Green Ant following interference from Jakob Hammermeier. On October 13, Green Ant challenged Tursas to a rematch at High Noon, which he accepted five days later. In preparation for the match, Mike Quackenbush agreed to teach Green Ant a new hold to help him in his upcoming battle.

While also wrestling in the 12 Large: Summit, Icarus started a rivalry with Gregory Iron, who defeated him in back-to-back matches on June 25 and September 18, leading Icarus to publicly accuse Iron of faking his cerebral palsy to gain sympathy from the audience. The fourth, and what is billed as the final confrontation between the two, will take place at High Noon. The 12 Large: Summit also ignited problems within BDK, culminating on July 31, when BDK member Sara Del Rey defeated stablemate Claudio Castagnoli, which led to him dismissing both Del Rey and Daizee Haze from the group, before leaving Chikara himself, having been eliminated from contention in the tournament. Del Rey spent the next months feuding with her former stablemates, including defeating Ares via submission and Tursas via disqualification in singles matches, before challenging Jakob Hammermeier to a match at High Noon. The match was made official on November 4. On November 2, a match between The Colony (Fire Ant and Soldier Ant) and The Young Bucks (Matt and Nick Jackson) was made official for High Noon. In Chikara, tag teams compete for points; a win earns a team one point, while a loss takes them all away. In order to challenge for the promotion's tag team championship, the Campeonatos de Parejas, a team needs three points. The Young Bucks earned two points by defeating The Batiri (Kodama and Obariyon) on August 27 and BDK (Tim Donst and Tursas) on September 18, while The Colony earned their two points by defeating Momo no Seishun Tag (Atsushi Kotoge and Daisuke Harada) on October 8 and by scoring the deciding pinfall over the Roughnecks (Brodie Lee and Grizzly Redwood) in a four-way elimination tag team match on October 30, setting up the match at High Noon to determine the next challenger for the Campeones de Parejas, Chuck Taylor and Johnny Gargano of F.I.S.T. On the day of High Noon, the champions themselves were working for Dragon Gate USA in Manhattan, New York.

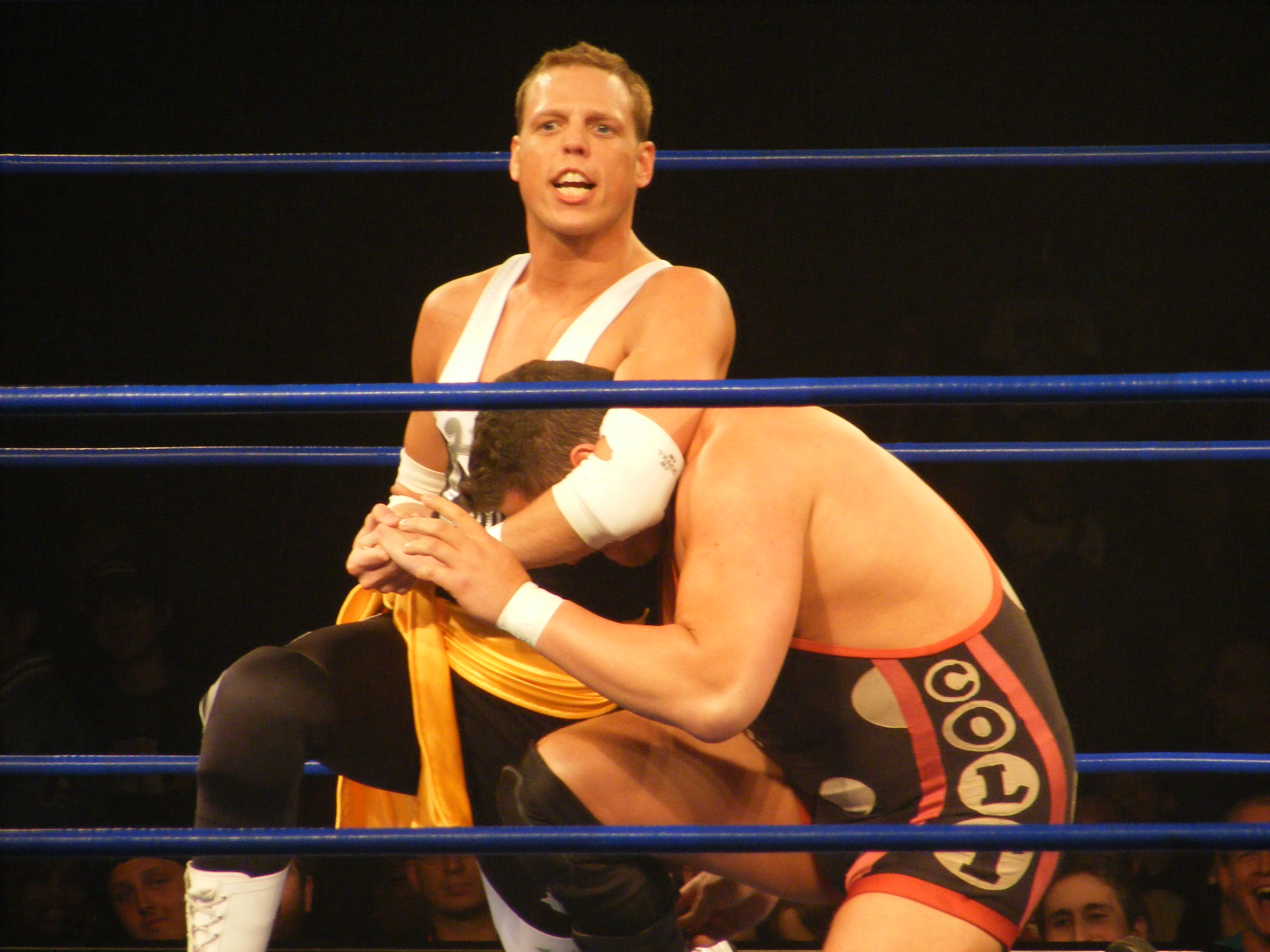
Archibald Peck holding Colt Cabana in a headlock during their first match against each other on April 16, 2011

After months of hype, Archibald Peck made his Chikara debut on March 12, 2011, and quickly went on a win streak, earning victories, often through cheating, over the likes of Colt Cabana, Frightmare, Sugar Dunkerton and Dasher Hatfield. On October 7, Peck and his valet, Veronica, introduced their new mascot Colt Cabunny, a man in a bunny costume dressed in a Colt Cabana singlet. The character had been previously seen in Chikara in early 2006, when it was portrayed by William Posada, better known as Joker. On October 20, a rematch between Peck and Cabana, who is not a regular member of the Chikara roster, was made official for High Noon, with Cabana claiming that Peck was mistreating Cabunny.

On May 11, 2011, it was announced that Amasis, a member of longtime Chikara group The Osirian Portal, had suffered "severe injuries in a non-wrestling accident" that would sideline him indefinitely, forcing him out of the 12 Large: Summit. On June 23 it was announced that Amasis had been forced to retire from professional wrestling due to his injuries. Chikara's Director of Fun Wink Vavasseur, who had brought Hieracon to Osirian Portal and had backed him as Amasis' replacement in the 12 Large: Summit, was dismayed when fans instead voted Ophidian to take his place in the tournament, and announced that with Amasis gone and the fans turning on Hieracon, he was disbanding The Osirian Portal. It was later announced that Amasis would return at High Noon to speak about his injury and reveal the future of the team.

== Event ==
Other on-screen personnel
Role:	Name:
Commentators	Bryce Remsburg
Commentators	Gavin Loudspeaker
Commentators	Leonard F. Chikarason
Commentators	Dr. Keith Lipinski (Pre-show)
Commentators	Steven Weiner (Pre-show)
Ring announcers	Gavin Loudspeaker
Ring announcers	Jakob Hammermeier
Referees	Bryce Remsburg
Referees	Derek Sabato
Referees	Jonathan Barber
Referees	Nick Papagiorgio

=== Pre-show ===
45 minutes before the start of the pay-per-view, Chikara presented a special "Pre-Show-A-Go-Go", which aired live on Ustream. Hosted by Dr. Keith Lipinski and Steve "The Turtle" Weiner, the show featured video packages hyping matches for the iPPV, interviews with Gregory Iron, Tim Donst, Jakob Hammermeier and Green Ant as well as the first match of the evening, between El Generico and Jigsaw. In the finish of the match, El Generico performed an exploder suplex into the turnbuckles on Jigsaw, before setting up for an Olé Kick. Jigsaw, however, managed to stop his attempt with a superkick and followed up with a diving double foot stomp for the win.

=== Preliminary matches ===
The first match on the iPPV itself was a tag team match between Fire Ant and Soldier Ant of The Colony and Matt and Nick Jackson of The Young Bucks, who were accompanied to the ring by one of their trainers, Marty Jannetty, who made his Chikara debut. Towards the end of the match, The Young Bucks performed double superkicks on both members of The Colony and then went for their finishing maneuver More Bang for Your Buck, which Soldier Ant managed to block with his knees, before rolling up Matt for the win. With the win, The Colony earned the right to challenge for the Campeonatos de Parejas.

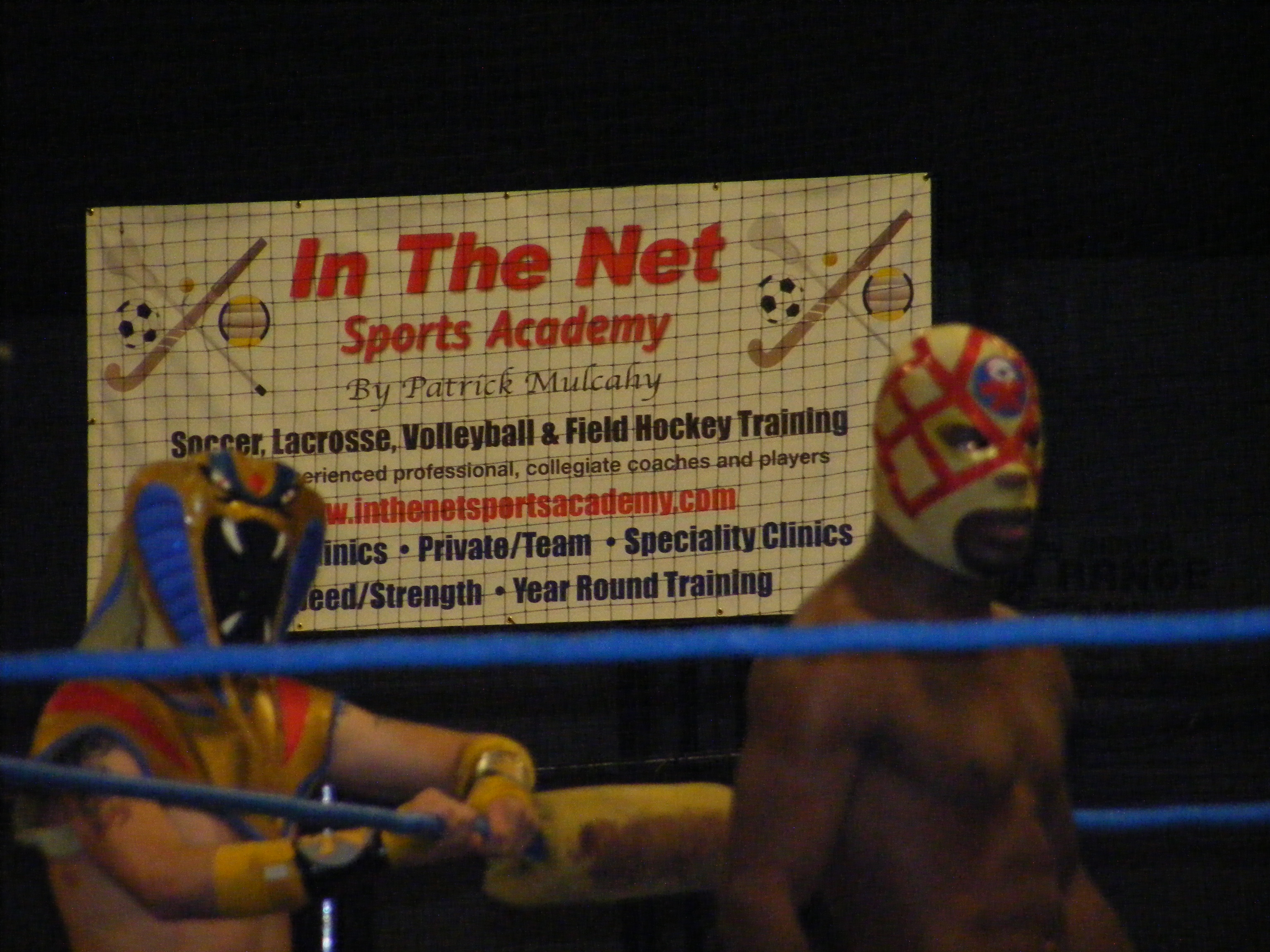
(Left to right) Ophidian and Amasis of The Osirian Portal

The second match on the iPPV saw Sara Del Rey facing former BDK stablemate, ring announcer Jakob Hammermeier, who performed his own ring announcement prior to the start of the match. Following a short, one-sided match, Del Rey pinned Hammermeier with the Royal Butterfly for the win.

After a video package, which hyped the upcoming debut of "Mr. Touchdown", The Osirian Portal of Amasis and Ophidian made their way to the ring for Amasis' announcement regarding his future in professional wrestling. Amasis' announcement was that he could not wrestle again as his doctor had told him that by wrestling he would risk having to spend the rest of his life in a wheelchair. After recapping the history of The Osirian Portal and claiming that they were the best tag team in the world, Amasis called for the team's signature dance routine. However, Ophidian surprised Amasis with a mist and then attacked him. After unmasking his former partner, the now rudo Ophidian was led out of the ring by Chikara officials.

The final match before intermission was a grudge match between Green Ant and Tursas, who was accompanied to the ring by the referee of the match, BDK member Derek Sabato. Towards the end of the match, Tursas hit Green Ant with a crossbody and a Kreuz Bomb, which resulted in a near-fall. After stopping his opponent on the top rope, Green Ant superplexed Tursas to the mat for a nearfall, before locking him in a new variation of the Chikara Special, later named Chikara Special: Green, which gave him a submission win over the Finn.

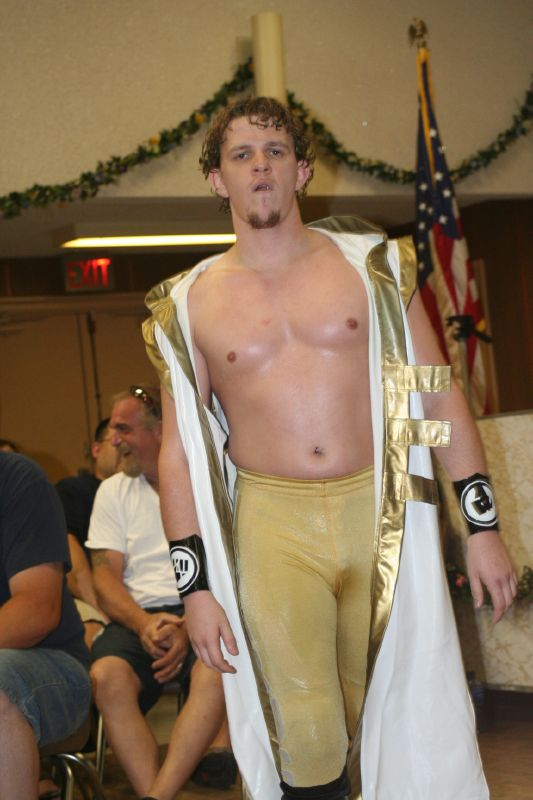
Icarus

The first match after intermission saw Colt Cabana taking on Archibald Peck, who was accompanied to the ring by Veronica and Colt Cabunny. As a result of Peck's animal testing of a new medicine for male pattern baldness, some of Cabunny's hair had turned green. At the end of the comedy match, Peck threw Cabunny in the ring and told him to attack Cabana, but he refused. Veronica then threw Peck's baton to the ring, which ended up in the hands of Cabunny. With the referee distracted, Cabunny considered his options and then hit Peck with the baton. This was followed by Cabana pinning Peck for the win. After the match Cabana and Cabunny shared a hug.

The fifth match featured Icarus taking on Gregory Iron in the fourth match the two had against each other in 2011, with Iron leading the series 2–1. In the end, Icarus, who was throughout the match heckled with chants of "worst in the world" by the fans in attendance, hit Iron with a loaded fanny pack outside the ring as the referee of the match was busy taking a steel chair away from him. After returning to the ring, beating a countout, Iron was hit with the Wings of Icarus, which was good for a near-fall. Iron then mounted a comeback and locked in a Crippled Crossface, which Icarus, however, managed to escape from. Iron then went for a German suplex, but Icarus blocked it by grabbing the referee and then kicking Iron in the groin. Icarus followed this up with the Blu-Ray, which gave him a three count and the win in the match. After the match, Icarus was looking to continue his attack on Iron, but was stopped by his former tag team partner Gran Akuma, who had made his return to Chikara, after a 16-month absence, the previous night. Akuma then went for a kick on Icarus, but ended up hitting Iron instead as Icarus ducked out of the way. The segment ended with Akuma checking on Iron as Icarus fled the arena.

=== Main event matches ===
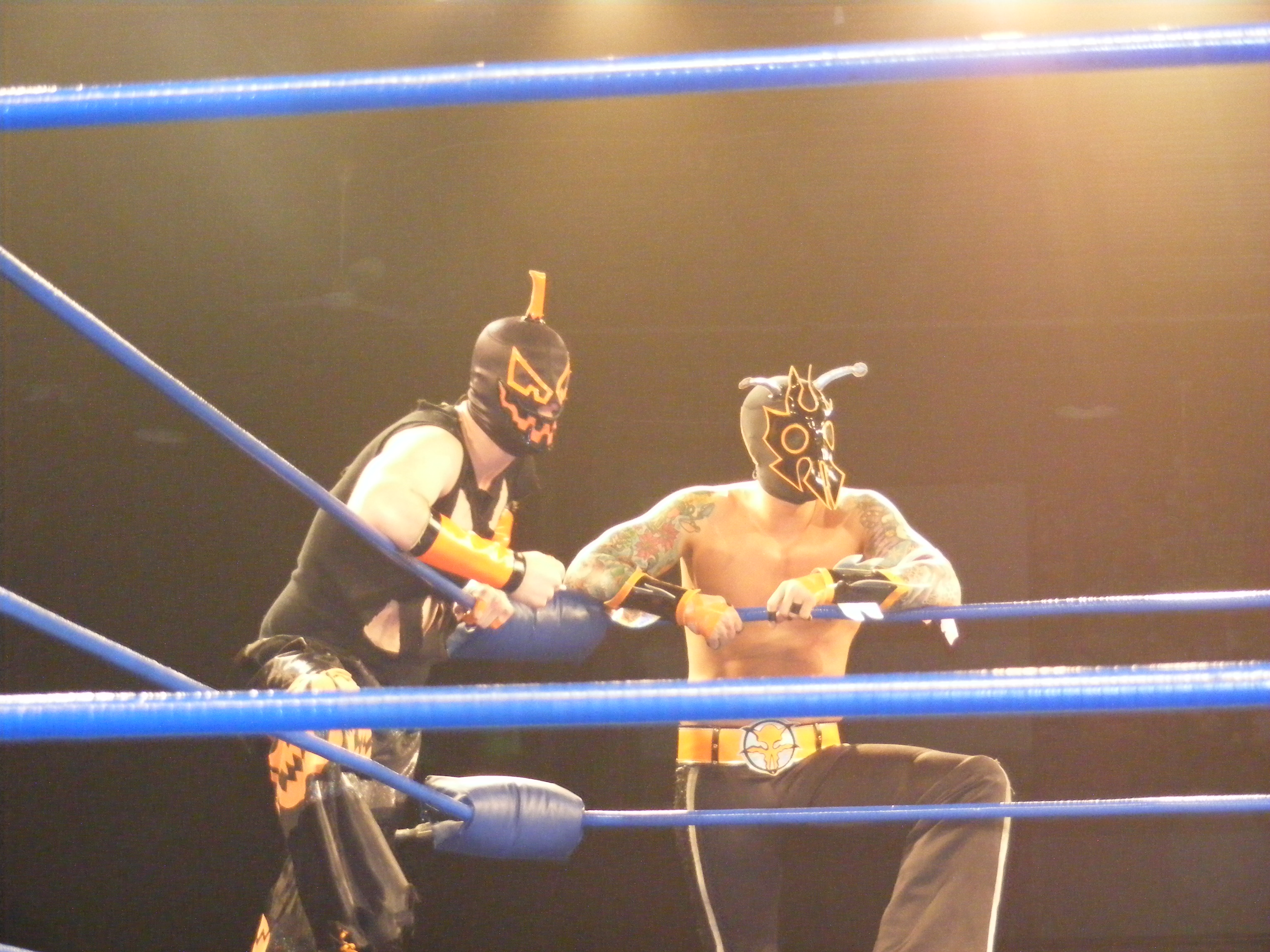
(Left to right) Hallowicked and UltraMantis Black of the Spectral Envoy

The first main event of the evening featured BDK members Ares and Tim Donst taking on the Spectral Envoy's Hallowicked and UltraMantis Black in a No Disqualification Lucha de Apuestas. During the match Jakob Hammermeier ran out and attacked Hallowicked, but was quickly taken out by Spectral Envoy member Crossbones. Donst tried to take advantage of the weakened Hallowicked, but was stopped by UltraMantis, who gave him a Praying Mantis Bomb. Ares managed to break up the resulting pinfall attempt and hit UltraMantis with a sitout double underhook powerbomb, which gave him a near-fall. Ares then went to perform the same move again, this time on a steel chair, but was stopped by Hallowicked's big boot. As he was about to re-enter the ring, Donst came face to face with Hallowicked and, instead of continuing the match, decided to leave the ringside area, abandoning his stablemate to save his hair. This was followed by UltraMantis dropping Ares on a steel chair with a Northern Lights Bomb, which resulted in a three count and a win for the Spectral Envoy. As a result, UltraMantis won back the Eye of Tyr. With the win, UltraMantis and Hallowicked also earned their third point and the right to challenge for the Campeonatos de Parejas.

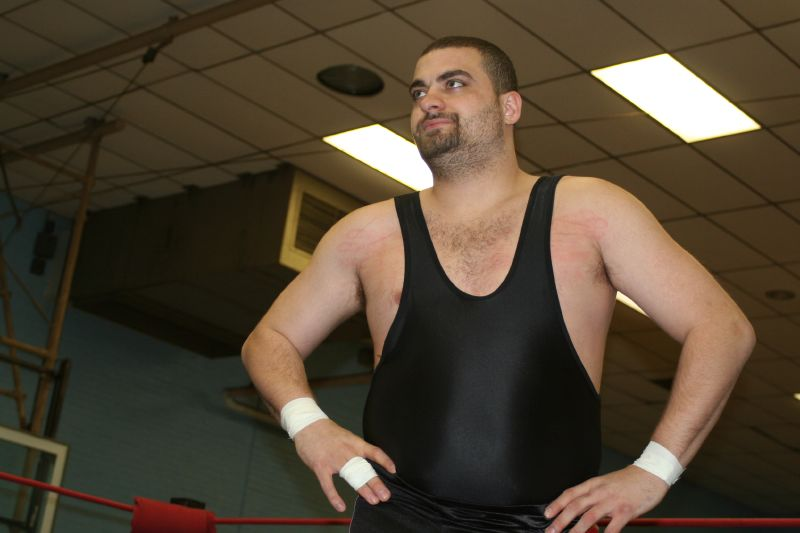
Eddie Kingston, the inaugural Chikara Grand Champion

The seventh and final match of the iPPV saw Eddie Kingston taking on Chikara founder Mike Quackenbush in the finals of the 12 Large: Summit to crown the first ever Chikara Grand Champion. Kingston was accompanied to the ring by Tommy Dreamer and Quackenbush by his tag team partner Jigsaw. The majority of the match saw Quackenbush targeting crowd favorite Kingston's injured knee. Towards the end of the match, the locker room emptied as current Chikara wrestlers like Hallowicked, UltraMantis Black, Frightmare, The Colony, Dasher Hatfield, Sugar Dunkerton, Sara Del Rey, Icarus, The Batiri, and more along with former Chikara wrestlers like Reckless Youth, Dragonfly, Mister Zero, Rorschach, Hydra, and others gathered around the ringside area. After surviving a Quackendriver III, Kingston locked Quackenbush in a cloverleaf. Despite the fans in attendance chanting for Quackenbush to submit, he managed to reach the ropes to force Kingston to break the hold. After both men got back on their feet, Quackenbush hit Kingston with a palm strike. Kingston answered back with a clothesline, a series of suplexes and two Backfists to the Future, after which he covered Quackenbush and scored the win to become the first ever Chikara Grand Champion.

Following the match Oliver Whybrow, the brother of the deceased Alex Whybrow, better known as Larry Sweeney, and Amy, a close friend of Alex's, entered the ring to present Kingston with the Grand Championship belt. Kingston, who was trained at the Chikara Wrestle Factory with Whybrow and who had referred to him as his best friend, appeared emotional as he received the belt, while the crowd chanted for Sweeney. Kingston then got on a microphone and proceeded to challenge wrestlers from WWE and TNA, including John Cena, CM Punk, Triple H and A.J. Styles, before claiming that no one can touch Chikara. The iPPV ended with Kingston celebrating in the ring.

== Aftermath ==
The DVD release of the event included a post-credits scene, where UltraMantis Black fooled Sinn Bodhi into leaving Chikara by handing him a fake replica of the Eye of Tyr. On November 16, it was announced that The Colony would be cashing in their points and challenging F.I.S.T. for the Campeonatos de Parejas on December 2 at the Asylum Arena in Philadelphia, during Chikara's special post-season JoshiMania weekend. In the end, F.I.S.T. managed to retain the title, defeating The Colony two falls to one in a two out of three falls match.

== Reception ==
Pro Wrestling Torch's Sean Radican praised the event not only for its match quality, but also for the video packages, graphics and event commercials, noting that other promotions like Dragon Gate USA and Ring of Honor have not presented anything like them on their own iPPV's, claiming that they made the event feel "like a big show and not a series of matches played out in front of a live crowd". Radican gave the main event the highest score, calling it "simply an incredible match with a big time atmosphere". Pro Wrestling Insider's Mike Johnson called High Noon "a tremendously entertaining iPPV show". 411Mania's Kevin Ford gave the event an overall score of 8 out of 10, writing "this may be the most well-rounded Chikara show ever in terms of all the different styles it provided". Reviewing the event for the Wrestling Observer Newsletter, Joe Babinsack wrote that "Chikara's first iPPV promised that it would take it to the next level, and it delivered", claiming that with High Noon, "Chikara has put its name at the highest levels of the indy promotional scene".

== Results ==
No.	Results	Stipulations	Times
1^{P}	Jigsaw defeated El Generico	Singles match	07:58
2	The Colony (Fire Ant and Soldier Ant) defeated The Young Bucks (Matt Jackson and Nick Jackson) (with Marty Jannetty)	Tag team match	13:32
3	Sara Del Rey defeated Jakob Hammermeier	Singles match	05:21
4	Green Ant defeated Tursas	Singles match	12:27
5	Colt Cabana defeated Archibald Peck (with Colt Cabunny and Veronica)	Singles match	11:34
6	Icarus defeated Gregory Iron	Singles match	12:19
7	The Spectral Envoy (Hallowicked and UltraMantis Black) defeated Bruderschaft des Kreuzes (Ares and Tim Donst)	No Disqualification tag team Lucha de Apuestas	12:47
8	Eddie Kingston (with Tommy Dreamer) defeated Mike Quackenbush (with Jigsaw)	12 Large: Summit finals for the Chikara Grand Championship	17:52
P / – the match was broadcast on the pre-show
