= UltraMantis Black =

American professional wrestler (born 1975)

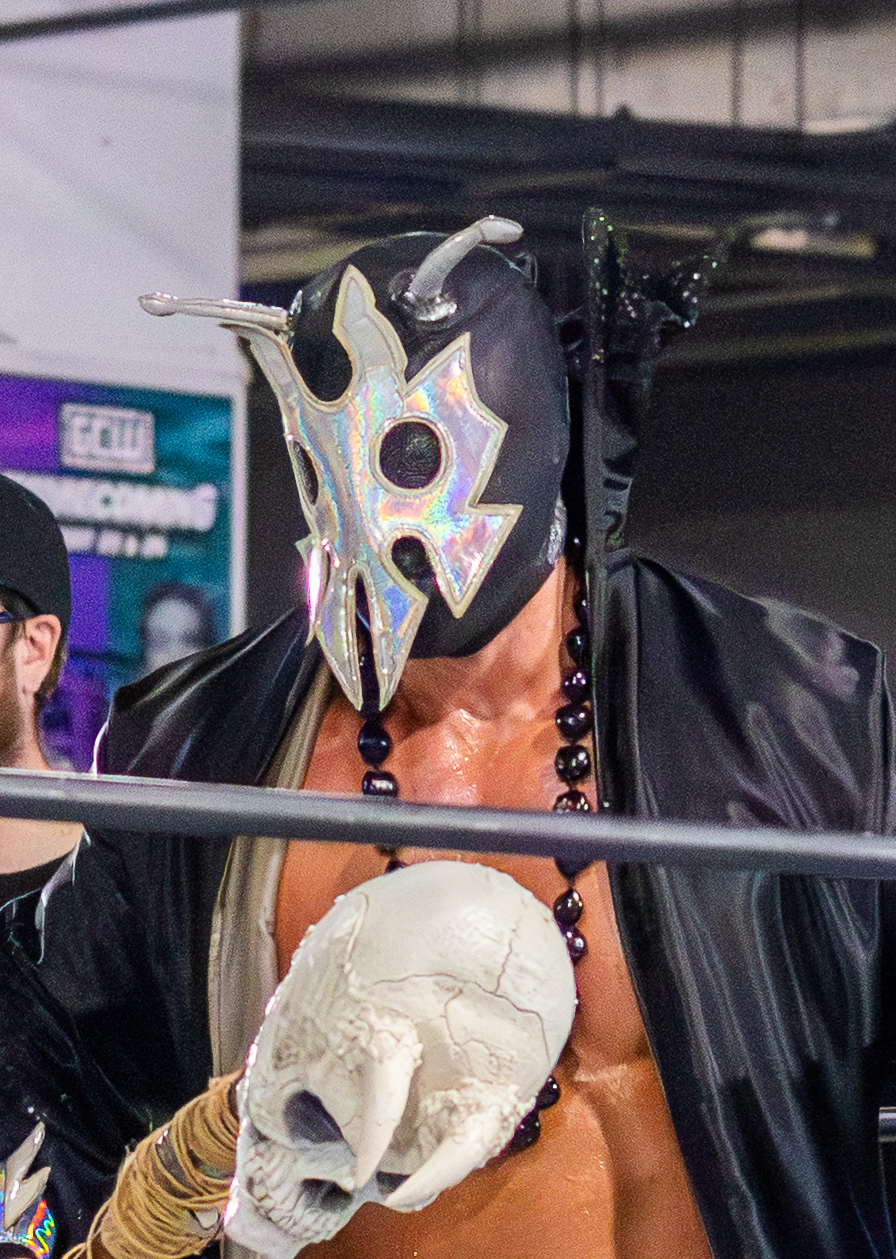
- UltraMantis Black in August 2025

Personal information
- Born: July 17, 1975 (age 51); Pennsylvania

Professional wrestling career
- Ring name(s): Black Mantis; Insecto del Espacio; UltraMantis; UltraMantis Black
- Billed height: 6 ft 1 in (1.85 m)
- Billed weight: 201 lb (91 kg)
- Billed from: The Black Tea Garden; Parts Unknown
- Trained by: Mike Quackenbush; Reckless Youth; Chris Hero; Jorge Rivera
- Debut: May 25, 2002

UltraMantis Black (born July 17, 1975) is a professional wrestler and musician. He is best known for his time in Chikara professional wrestling promotion. He is a former one-time Chikara Grand Champion and winner of the 2012 King of Trios tournament. Throughout his career he has also worked for promotions such as Big Japan Pro Wrestling (BJW), Combat Zone Wrestling (CZW), Jersey All Pro Wrestling (JAPW) and Independent Wrestling Association Mid-South.

As part of his gimmick, he wears a mantis mask. As UltraMantis, his original red and green attire was based on the main protagonist from the Kamen Rider series, while his ring name was derived from another Japanese television program, Ultraman. In May 2004, he became a heel and renamed himself UltraMantis Black, adopted a new mask and a black-based attire, while also beginning to express communist views. In June 2006 he formed his own stable, the Order of the Neo–Solar Temple and adopted the dark look he has used to this day.

Since Chikara's closure, he has mainly performed for his Lehigh Valley Athletics Council (LVAC) promotion, as well as Game Changer Wrestling (GCW) and the Philadelphia-based Power Pro Lucha (PPL).

== Professional wrestling career ==
UltraMantis started his professional wrestling training in 2002 at the brand new Chikara Wrestle Factory, where he was trained by Mike Quackenbush and Reckless Youth. He trained on the first term of the school alongside the likes of Hallowicked and Icarus.

=== Chikara ===
==== Debut and alliance with Mister Zero (2002–2003) ====
On May 25, 2002, UltraMantis made his Chikara debut as a tecnico superhero on the promotion's first show, where he was defeated by fellow Wrestle Factory graduate Blind Rage. Afterwards, he teamed up with another Wrestle Factory graduate, Mister Zero, to form the tag team Ultra/Zero, and together they would feud with The Wildcards (Eddie Kingston and BlackJack Marciano) for most of 2003. The long feud ended on July 5, 2003, when Ultra/Zero defeated The Wildcards in the semifinals of the inaugural Tag World Grand Prix. The duo would lose in the finals against Night Shift (Blind Rage and Hallowicked) after Zero suffered an injury. On September 27, 2003, UltraMantis received a shot at the Chikara Young Lions Cup, but was defeated by the defending champion Hallowicked.

==== Turning rudo (2004–2005) ====
In early 2004, UltraMantis began showing signs of a becoming a rudo after adopting a more aggressive style and attacking fellow wrestlers after they had managed to defeat him. Finally, on April 9, 2004, UltraMantis cemented his rudo turn by abandoning Zero during a tag team match against BLKOUT (Joker and Sabian), letting their opponents get the win. UltraMantis then debuted a new black mask and declared that UltraMantis was dead before announcing the birth of UltraMantis Black. He would then form a tag team with Hallowicked, known collectively as the Dark Breed, and together they would feud with Mister Zero and his new tag team partner Shane Storm. For the 2004 torneo cibernetico, the Dark Breed joined Larry Sweeney's faction Sweet 'n' Sour International, but after neither of them managed to win the match, they left the faction. In early 2005, UltraMantis Black began suffering from injuries that would force him to take on the roles of a commentator, a role he continues to hold, and a manager for Hallowicked.

==== Alliance and feud with Hydra (2005–2008) ====
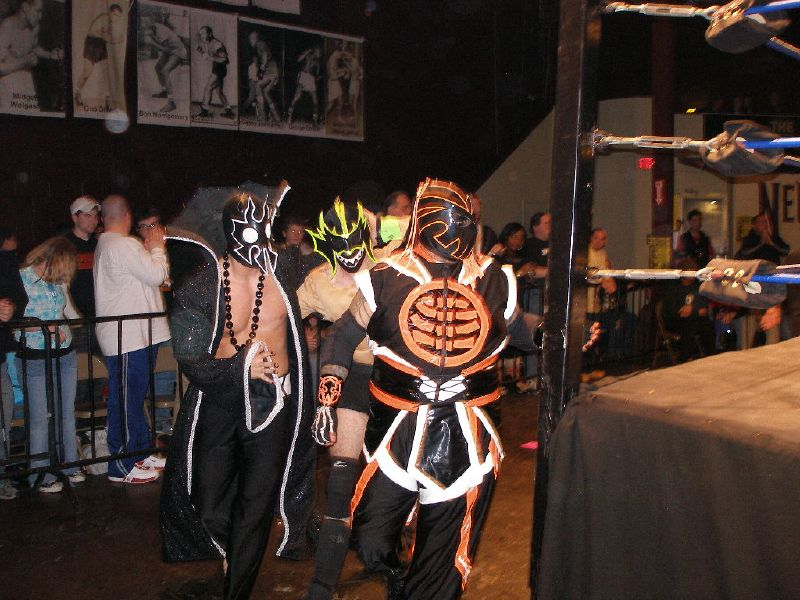
(Left to right) UltraMantis Black, Hydra and Crossbones of the Order of the Neo–Solar Temple

On November 13, 2005, UltraMantis Black debuted his newest protégé, Hydra. With UltraMantis out with an injury, Hallowicked became a tecnico after forming the tag team Incoherence with tecnico wrestler Delirious. Beginning in 2006, Ultramantis debuted an entirely new mantis mask. Later on in June of that year, during the Young Lions Cup tournament, UltraMantis attacked Hallowicked and then announced the death of the Dark Breed and the birth of The Order of the Neo–Solar Temple. In October of that same year, Crossbones joined UltraMantis and Hydra as the third member of the stable. The feud between the Neo–Solar Temple and Incoherence would end during the season five finale weekend, where Incoherence first defeated UltraMantis and Hydra in a tag team match on November 17 and then UltraMantis, Hydra, Crossbones and Blind Rage in an eight-man tag team match, where they teamed up with Cheech and Cloudy, the following day.

UltraMantis, Hydra and Crossbones spent 2007 wrestling together on the undercards of Chikara events. Towards the end of the year, the team started to grow apart and on November 17, UltraMantis inexplicably helped Shane Storm, who had been on a long losing streak, defeat Hydra. On April 19, 2008, UltraMantis defeated Tim Donst, whom he had dropped on his head in Donst's debut the previous year, with the Praying Mantis Bomb. After the match, the Neo–Solar Temple kidnapped the concussed Donst and managed to convince him to become the fourth member of the faction. However, this would all be revealed a plan by Mike Quackenbush as he had sent Donst to infiltrate the Neo–Solar Temple in order to find out who had leaked the secret of the Chikara Special to Chris Hero. Quackenbush had been feuding with Hero and in the course of the feud, Quackenbush invented a move which Hero could not break. After defeating him in a singles match, Quackenbush taught the move to every tecnico on the Chikara roster. However, on November 17, 2007, Hero had been able to break the hold and use it himself to win his feud against Equinox. On June 18, 2008, Donst left the Neo–Solar Temple and with information gathered undercover, he was able to reveal to Quackenbush that Shane Storm, Quackenbush's longtime tag team partner, had been the one who had leaked the move and the counter to it to UltraMantis Black, who in turn taught the move to Hero. After being given an ultimatum by UltraMantis, Hydra left the Order with Donst and together they would form the tag team known as the Sea Donsters, resulting in the Neo–Solar Temple being dwindled down to a tag team. UltraMantis and Crossbones would feud the rest of the year with Donst and Hydra. On December 12, 2008, the Sea Donsters defeated the Neo–Solar Temple in a tag team match after Donst pinned Crossbones with the Donstitution. Two days later, at the season seven finale, UltraMantis and Hydra faced each other in a singles match, which Hydra was able to win after forcing his former mentor to tap out to the Hydra Lock, effectively ending their feud.

==== The Eye of Tyr and BDK (2009–2010) ====
In 2009 UltraMantis and Crossbones began looking for a third member in the Neo–Solar Temple. Pinkie Sanchez and Sami Callihan were given chances, but neither of them could help the Neo–Solar Temple to qualify for the 2009 King of Trios. In early 2009 UltraMantis, after being threatened by Quackenbush, revealed that the reason he had wanted the Chikara Special from Shane Storm the previous year was that with it he could get his hands on the Eye of Tyr, a mysterious artifact that could be used to control minds. The artifact, which had gone missing from Switzerland, had suddenly appeared in possession of Dr. Cube over at Kaiju Big Battel. Cube was a fan of Chris Hero's and was ready to swap the Eye of Tyr for him. Shane Storm came to UltraMantis and offered to teach him the move in order to get back to his winning ways and this is why UltraMantis had helped him defeat Hydra back in November 2007. After learning the move, UltraMantis taught it to Hero, who then, after winning his feud with Equinox, agreed to leave Chikara for Kaiju Big Battel and in exchange, Dr. Cube handed the Eye of Tyr to UltraMantis.

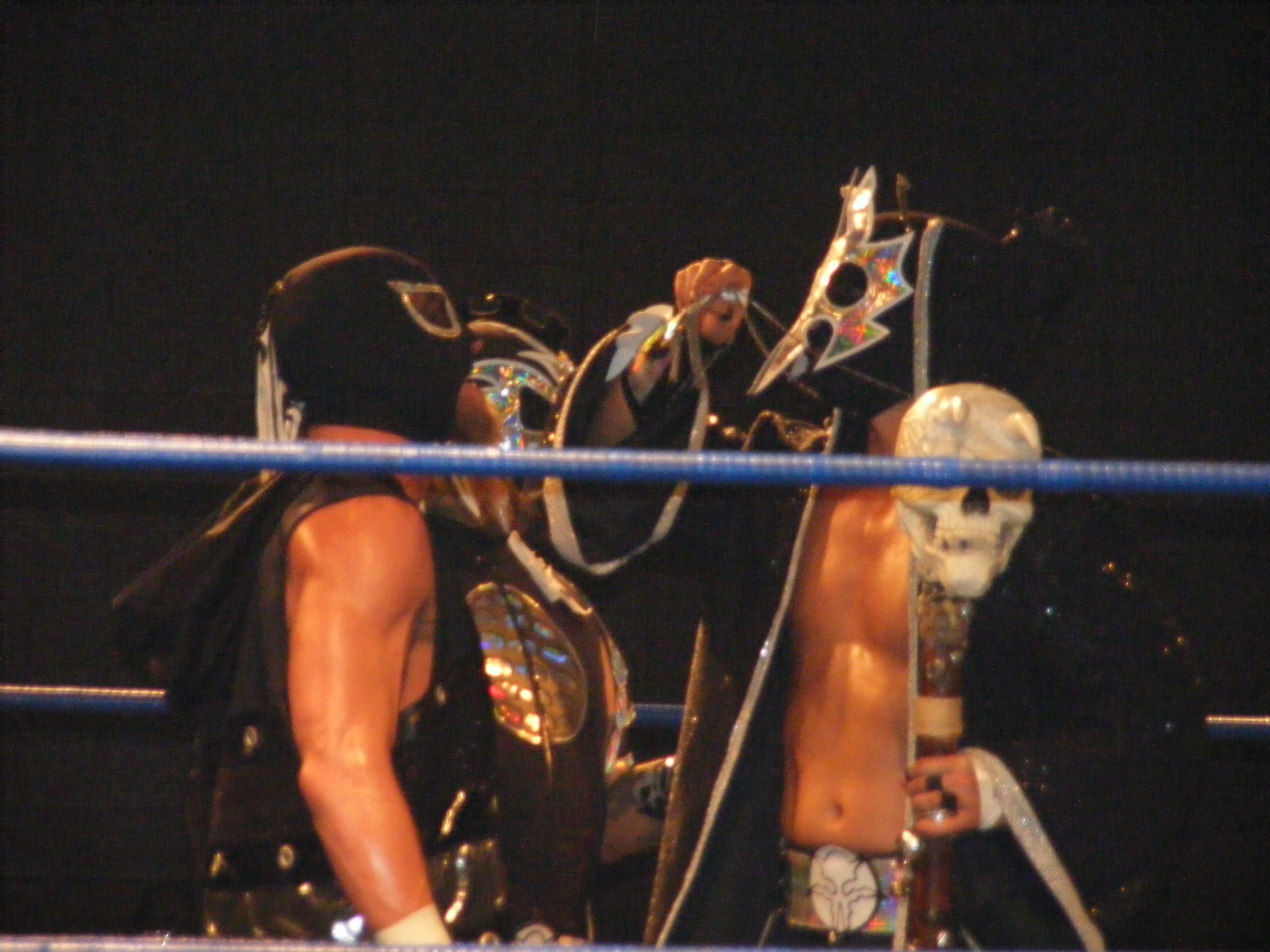
UltraMantis Black controlling Delirious with the Eye of Tyr

In April 2009, UltraMantis saw a chance to finally get revenge on his former Dark Breed partner Hallowicked and on April 26, he and Crossbones kidnapped Delirious after Incoherence's match. On May 23, 2009, UltraMantis Black and Crossbones debuted the new third member of the Neo–Solar Temple, Delirious, who had been brainwashed with the Eye of Tyr and was now under the control of UltraMantis. With their newest recruit, the Order went on a winning streak, which included tag team victories over The Super Smash Bros. (Player Uno and Player Dos), The Roughnecks (Eddie Kingston and Grizzly Redwood) and The Colony (Carpenter Ant and Green Ant) and a trios victory over Mike Quackenbush, Claudio Castagnoli and Skayde. According to a legend, once the Eye of Tyr is used, it must be given away, or the user would face bad luck and tragedy. However, UltraMantis did not believe this and refused to let go of the Eye. On August 16, 2009, during the third night of the annual Young Lions Cup, a man dressed in a white mask and clothes confronted UltraMantis Black in the ring and gave him a box. Inside of the box was a message stating that a war was coming. That same man would then begin sending messages over the internet to UltraMantis saying that he and his Temple would be destroyed if he did not return the Eye of Tyr to the "family". On October 18, 2009, at Cibernetico Increible the man was joined by another larger man dressed in similar fashion and together they appeared in the crowd and confronted UltraMantis, who proceeded to flee the arena. Following the event a cyborg named Vökoder, who had debuted during the Young Lions Cup, came to UltraMantis and offered to protect the Eye of Tyr and to convince him of his sincerity, Vökoder started interfering in UltraMantis' matches in order to help him win. Eventually, UltraMantis made Vökoder the fourth member of The Order of the Neo–Solar Temple.

On November 22, 2009, during the season eight finale titled Three-Fisted Tales, UltraMantis and Delirious defeated Hallowicked and his new Incoherence partner Frightmare to earn their third point, which meant that they could now challenge for the Chikara Campeonatos de Parejas. At the conclusion of the event the two masked men once again confronted UltraMantis, calling him the man with the real power in Chikara. This time both men removed their masks and revealed themselves as Ares and Tursas. Immediately following this, Vökoder, who had been given the Eye of Tyr for safekeeping, attacked UltraMantis, while Claudio Castagnoli, Carpenter Ant, Sara Del Rey and Daizee Haze all turned rudo and helped Ares and Tursas beat down the tecnicos, who had gathered around the ringside area. Once the fight had subdued with the new group on top, Carpenter Ant unmasked as Pinkie Sanchez and Vökoder unmasked as Tim Donst, both of whom had a history with UltraMantis Black. After a salute, the group fled the arena with the Eye of Tyr intact. Following the event, UltraMantis met with Quackenbush and claimed that in order to defeat the new group, named Bruderschaft des Kreuzes, tecnicos and rudos would have to join forces as they now had a common enemy.

Despite the events that took place at the season eight finale and Tim Donst, Ares and Claudio Castagnoli taking shots at the Order of the Neo–Solar Temple on Chikara's official website, UltraMantis Black announced at the beginning of season nine his intentions of staying away from BDK in order to protect his team ahead of the upcoming match for the Campeonatos de Parejas and the 2010 King of Trios tournament. On February 28, 2010, at A World of Comforting Illusions UltraMantis Black and Delirious used their three points and challenged The Colony of Fire Ant and Soldier Ant for the Campeonatos de Parejas. The Colony retained their titles in two straight falls, after Ares came out and used the Eye of Tyr to release Delirious, who then proceeded to go crazy and run out of the arena, abandoning UltraMantis. The following day Ares declared victory over UltraMantis and announced that now that he had gained revenge on him by destroying his dream of winning, not only the Campeonatos de Parejas, but also the King of Trios, he would be returning the Eye of Tyr to Switzerland and his father's collection. On April 25 Chikara announced that UltraMantis Black would star in the company's first video game, titled Rudo Resurrection, to be released later in the year.

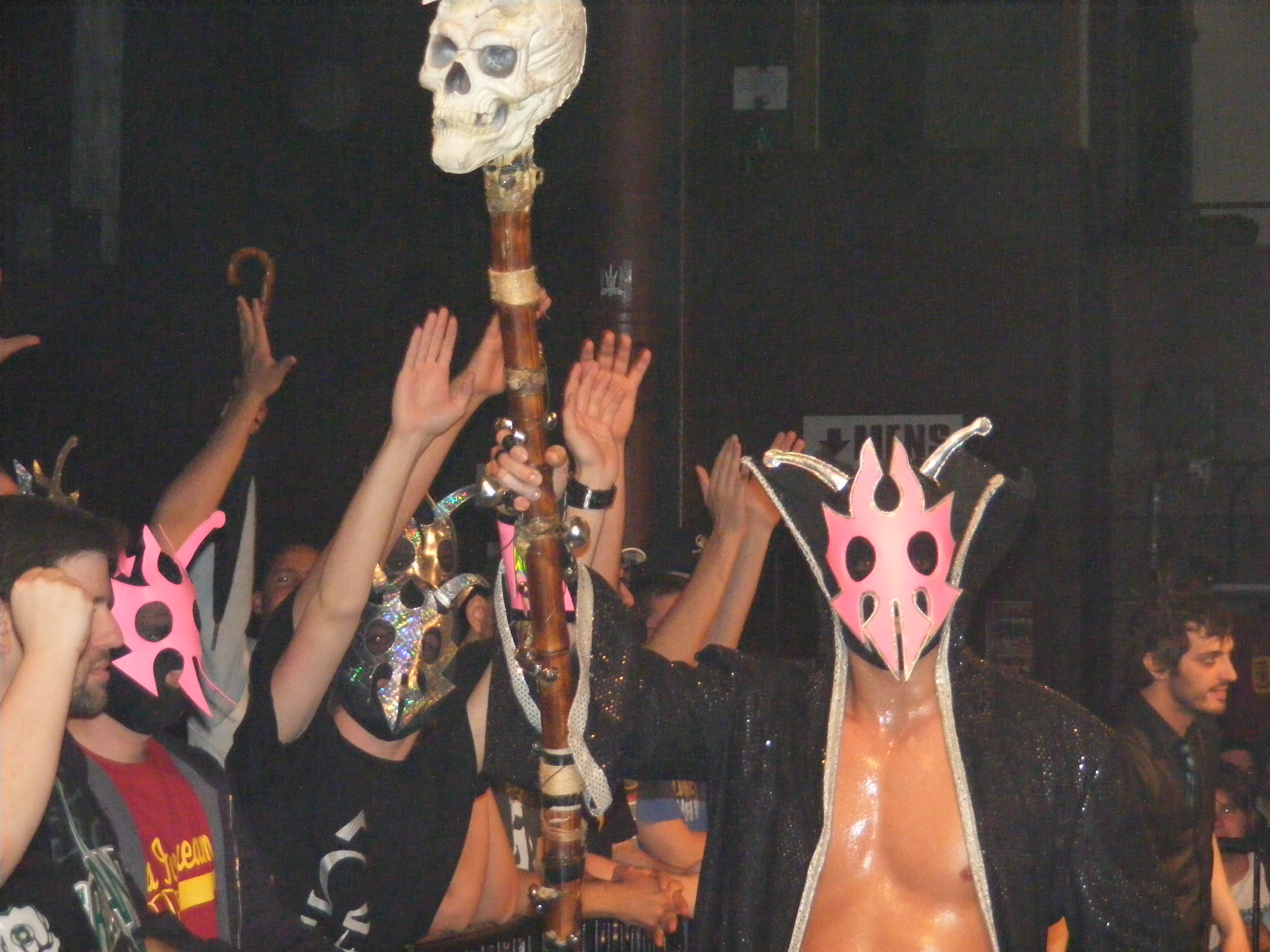
UltraMantis Black's 2010 tecnico look

On May 22 at Aniversario Zehn UltraMantis Black finally entered the ring with a member of BDK, when he faced Ares in a singles match. Ares managed to score the pinfall, when Delirious, now aligned with BDK, made his return to the company and cost UltraMantis the match. During the match Delirious also attacked Crossbones, which left him sidelined with a clavicle injury, leaving UltraMantis Black standing as the last surviving member of the Order of the Neo–Solar Temple. Following the event UltraMantis took responsibility for causing the formation of BDK, before declaring that it was now his job to take the stable down, turning tecnico for the first time since April 2004. His change in attitude could also be seen in him adopting a new pink mask. On June 26 at We Must Eat Michigan's Brain he defeated his former protégé, Delirious, in a singles match. The following day at Faded Scars and Lines UltraMantis continued his tecnico turn by saving Mike Quackenbush and Frightmare from BDK. On July 23 UltraMantis Black announced that he would lead Chikara into a final battle with BDK in the torneo cibernetico match on October 23. Two days later at Chikarasaurus Rex: King of Show he was joined by two hooded individuals by his side, while doing commentary for the show. On August 11 Chikara founder Mike Quackenbush answered UltraMantis' call to arms by joining his cibernetico team and he was followed a week later by another Chikara original, Eddie Kingston, who had been feuding with Claudio Castagnoli for over a year. On August 31 Quackenbush's regular tag team partner Jigsaw joined UltraMantis' cibernetico team. On September 10 UltraMantis Black announced that he had recruited rudo STIGMA, formerly Shane Storm, to his cibernetico team and sent out an invitation to another Chikara original, longtime rival Hallowicked, to join them, while also expressing his concern that Eddie Kingston, whom he dubbed a loose cannon, might not be a right fit for the team. On September 19 at Through Savage Progress Cuts the Jungle Line UltraMantis Black defeated Hallowicked in a singles match, but did not get an answer on whether he would join his cibernetico team or not. On September 28 UltraMantis reached out to Quackenbush to help him get Hallowicked to join the cibernetico team, while also announcing that he had recruited Icarus, the last of the four Chikara wrestlers, who performed on the promotion's first ever show, to join the team. On October 12 Hallowicked finally joined the cibernetico team on the condition that Eddie Kingston was allowed to remain on the team, which UltraMantis Black accepted. With Mike Quackenbush, Eddie Kingston, Jigsaw, STIGMA, Hallowicked and Icarus having joined UltraMantis Black, his cibernetico team was left just one man short. The final spot on Team Chikara was filled on October 19 by a new incarnation of Vökoder, who had been stalking Pinkie Sanchez since July. On October 23 UltraMantis Black led his team to the torneo cibernetico match, where they faced BDK, represented by captain Ares, Claudio Castagnoli, Daizee Haze, Delirious, Pinkie Sanchez, Sara Del Rey, Tim Donst and Tursas. During the match Vökoder was unmasked as Larry Sweeney, who then proceeded to eliminate Sanchez from the match, before being eliminated himself. UltraMantis managed to gain a measure of revenge on BDK by eliminating both its captain, Ares, and his former tag team partner, Delirious, from the match, before being eliminated himself by Tursas. In the end Eddie Kingston pinned Tursas to win the match. On November 21, UltraMantis Black was defeated by Ares in a Falls Count Anywhere match. During the match the two hooded figures, who had debuted in July, revealed themselves as Kodama and Obariyon, two Chikara newcomers, and attempted to interfere in the match to negate an interference from Tursas, but were summoned away by a third hooded figure.

==== The Spectral Envoy (2010–2014) ====
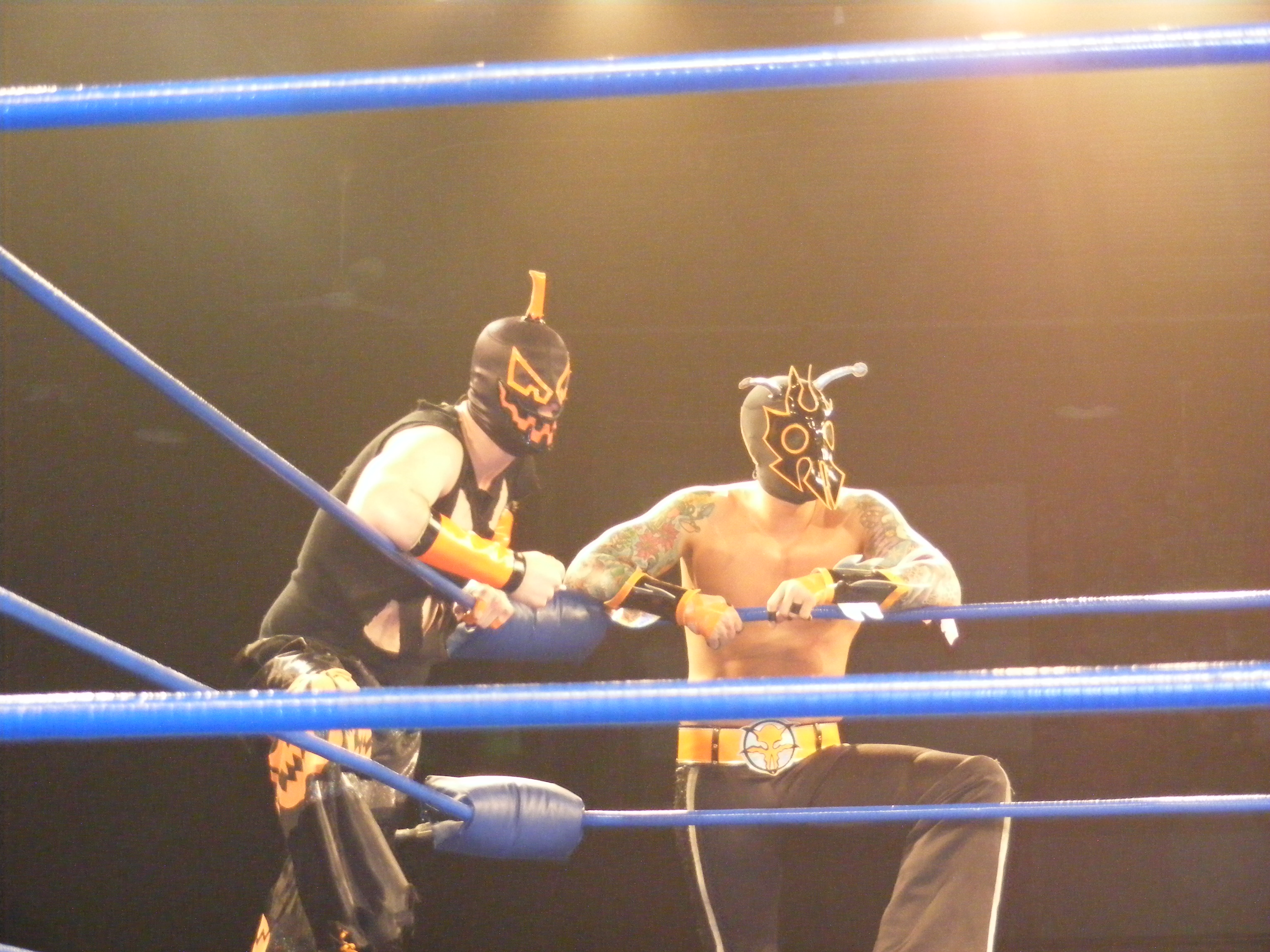
UltraMantis Black and Hallowicked reunited as the Spectral Envoy in April 2011

At the season nine finale, Reality is Relative, on December 12, Hallowicked defeated UltraMantis Black in a singles match. After the match the third hooded figure from the previous month entered the arena and revealed himself as Sinn Bodhi. Bodhi then revealed that UltraMantis Black had come to him asking for his help against BDK and he had given him Obariyon and Kodama and now he had come for his payment, the Eye of Tyr. When UltraMantis was unable to produce the Eye of Tyr he was attacked by Obariyon, Kodama and the debuting Kobald. In the end, Hallowicked and Frightmare made the save for UltraMantis and chased Bodhi's group, later named The Batiri, out of the ring. Two days later UltraMantis revealed in a blog that after the debut of BDK, he had gone soul searching and ran into three strange beings, who while a possible asset to the Order of the Neo–Solar Temple, needed training. UltraMantis could not send them to the Chikara Wrestle Factory, which was run by BDK leader Claudio Castagnoli and turned to his old acquaintance Sinn Bodhi for help. Bodhi not only trained the three, but also made them obey him, not UltraMantis and with his actions cost him his match against Ares the previous month. At the season ten premiere, Chaos in the Sea of Lost Souls, on January 23, 2011, UltraMantis Black defeated Bodhi via disqualification, after being attacked by The Batiri. A rematch between UltraMantis Black and Bodhi took place on March 13, with Bodhi emerging victorious, while also tearing his opponent's mask to shreds. On April 11 UltraMantis Black announced his intention of righting his past wrongs and named his manipulation of Delirious in particular. On April 15, during the first night of the 2011 King of Trios, UltraMantis Black, Hallowicked and Frightmare, now known collectively as the Spectral Envoy, confronted the BDK trio of Tim Donst, Delirious and Jakob Hammermeier after their first round match. Delirious, seemingly remembering his former tag team partner Hallowicked, ran out of the building, after which the Spectral Envoy brawled backstage with BDK. Later in the night, the Spectral Envoy was eliminated from the King of Trios tournament in the first round by Team Dragon Gate (Akira Tozawa, KAGETORA and Super Shisa). On July 30, UltraMantis vowed to eliminate each member of BDK in order to get a one-on-one rematch with Ares and started by attacking Jakob Hammermeier during his match with Gregory Iron and followed that up by defeating Pinkie Sanchez on August 27. On September 18, Crossbones made his return to Chikara joining the Spectral Envoy in an eight-man tag team match, where they defeated Sinn Bodhi, Kobald, Kodama and Obariyon, when UltraMantis pinned Bodhi. With his feud with Bodhi behind him, UltraMantis sought to end his long rivalry with Ares by challenging him to a match at Chikara's first ever Internet pay-per-view, offering to put his mask on the line against Ares' Eye of Tyr. On November 13 at High Noon, UltraMantis and Hallowicked defeated Ares and Tim Donst in a No Disqualification match with UltraMantis pinning Ares to regain the Eye of Tyr. In winning the match, UltraMantis and Hallowicked also picked up their third point, earning the right to challenge for the Campeonatos de Parejas.

UltraMantis first used the Eye of Tyr to get rid of Sinn Bodhi, handing him what was later revealed as a fake replica, which led to Bodhi parting ways with the promotion. On the DVD release of The Thirteenth Hat, UltraMantis used the Eye of Tyr to release Delirious from BDK, after which Delirious grabbed the artifact and destroyed it. On February 25, UltraMantis and Hallowicked challenged F.I.S.T. (Chuck Taylor and Icarus) for the Campeonatos de Parejas, but were defeated when Delirious made his return and cost the two the match. The next evening in Long Island, Delirious announced that he would be targeting UltraMantis until 2014 to gain revenge for the two years that UltraMantis had cost him by using the Eye of Tyr on him. On September 14, UltraMantis, Frightmare and Hallowicked entered the 2012 King of Trios, defeating Mihara, The Mysterious and Handsome Stranger and Tito Santana in their first round match. The following day, the Spectral Envoy advanced to the semifinals of the tournament, after defeating Delirious' new protégés, Kobald, Kodama and Obariyon of The Batiri. However, following the match, the Spectral Envoy was attacked by members of The Batiri and Ophidian, another new associate of Delirious. On the third and final day of the tournament, the Spectral Envoy first defeated F.I.S.T. (Chuck Taylor, Icarus and Johnny Gargano) in the semifinals and then Team ROH (Mike Bennett, Matt Jackson and Nick Jackson) in the finals, despite interference from Delirious, The Batiri and Ophidian, to win the 2012 King of Trios. At the following event on October 6, UltraMantis Black and Hallowicked defeated Los Ice Creams (El Hijo del Ice Cream and Ice Cream Jr.) to pick up their third point and earn the right to challenge for the Campeonatos de Parejas. They received their title shot on November 10, but were defeated by the defending Campeones, The Young Bucks (Matt Jackson and Nick Jackson), following interference from Ophidian and The Batiri. On December 2 at Chikara's third internet pay-per-view, Under the Hood, UltraMantis Black led Frightmare, Hallowicked and the returning Blind Rage and Crossbones to a ten-man tag team match, where they defeated Delirious, Kobald, Kodama, Obariyon and Ophidian, with UltraMantis pinning Delirious for the win.

After a one-year hiatus, Chikara returned on May 25, 2014, with the You Only Live Twice internet pay-per-view. The Spectral Envoy worked the event's first match, where they were defeated by the new BDK of Ares, Nøkken and Tursas. On September 19, The Spectral Envoy entered the 2014 King of Trios as the defending tournament winners. They were, however, eliminated in their first round match by Eddie Kingston, Jimmy Jacobs and Volgar, representing Chikara's new top rudo stable The Flood, after their stablemate Deucalion brought out Delirious to attack UltraMantis. The feud between UltraMantis and Delirious culminated on December 6 at Tomorrow Never Dies, where UltraMantis defeated Delirious in a "Loser Leaves Chikara" match. However, following the match, Delirious used the Eye of Tyr, which the Flood had managed to put back together, to turn Hallowicked and Frightmare against UltraMantis.

==== The Arcane Horde and The heXed Men (2015–2016) ====
In early 2015, Chikara started the Challenge of the Immortals tournament with UltraMantis Black appointed captain of one of the ten teams. In the draft, he picked Kodama, Obariyon and Oleg the Usurper for his team, named "The Arcane Horde". On September 9, UltraMantis announced he was forced to retire from professional wrestling due to leg injuries he had suffered over the past few months.

Afterwards, UltraMantis Black continued appearing for Chikara as a manager for the Arcane Horde. In April 2016, he entered a storyline, where Hallowicked and Frightmare used the Eye of Tyr to turn him to their side. UltraMantis himself then took control of Icarus, Kodama and Obariyon's minds to add them to the new group. On December 3, after the heXed Men had been defeated in the 2016 torneo cibernetico, Ophidian stole the Eye of Tyr from UltraMantis Black, releasing him from under its spell. This led to UltraMantis standing up from his wheelchair, saying he remembered everything and chasing Hallowicked from the ring.

==== Grand Champion (2017) ====
On February 4, 2017, UltraMantis Black appeared at Chikara's season 18 opener, seemingly announcing his return to in-ring action. During the announcement UltraMantis wore the Grand Championship belt, which was last held by Hallowicked. It was later confirmed that UltraMantis Black was the actual Grand Champion, having won the title during season 17, which had been taped at the end of 2016 on December 29. He lost the title to Juan Francisco de Coronado on April 1. On November 24, 2018, UltraMantis Black competed in a 14-man elimination match at CHIKARA Cibernetico - 7 Man Army as part of Team CHIKARA, where his team would be defeated in what would be his final match for the promotion.

=== Absolute Intense Wrestling (2013) ===
On November 1, 2013, UltraMantis Black made a surprise debut for Absolute Intense Wrestling (AIW), challenging Ethan Page and defeating him in the subsequent match to win the promotion's top title, the AIW Absolute Championship. This marked the first championship reign in UltraMantis' career. On December 27, UltraMantis lost the title back to Page in a three-way elimination match also involving Johnny Gargano.

== Music career ==
Ultramantis played in Nazareth, Pennsylvania hardcore band The Ultimate Warriors until their breakup In 2004. In 2014, UltraMantis and members of Pissed Jeans formed a hardcore band also named UltraMantis Black, they have released two full-lengths through Relapse Records and an extended play on cassette. Much of the band's lyrics are written from a pro-vegan perspective.

== Personal life ==
UltraMantis is a vegan and straight edge. He is close friends with his former tag team partner Mister Zero and served as best man at his wedding.

== Championships and accomplishments ==
- Absolute Intense Wrestling
  - AIW Absolute Championship (1 time)
- Chikara
  - Chikara Grand Championship (1 time)
  - King of Trios (2012) – with Frightmare and Hallowicked
- Pro Wrestling Illustrated
  - PWI ranked him #289 of the top 500 singles wrestlers in the PWI 500 in 2009
- SetUp Thailand Pro Wrestling
  - IWA Japan SetUp World Championship - ( 1 time , current)

== See also ==
- List of vegans
- List of people who follow a straight edge lifestyle
