= Chikara Grand Championship =

Professional wrestling championship

Details
- Promotion: Chikara
- Date established: February 3, 2011
- Date retired: June 24, 2020
Statistics
- First champion: Eddie Kingston
- Final champion: Dasher Hatfield
- Most reigns: Hallowicked (2 reigns)
- Longest reign: Eddie Kingston (924 days)
- Shortest reign: UltraMantis Black (93
- Oldest champion: UltraMantis Black (41 years)
- Youngest champion: Princess KimberLee (25 years, 161 days)
- Heaviest champion: Eddie Kingston (228 lb (103 kg))
- Lightest champion: Princess KimberLee (120 lb (54 kg))

The Chikara Grand Championship was a professional wrestling championship owned by the Chikara promotion. The first champion was crowned on November 13, 2011, at the High Noon pay-per-view, when Eddie Kingston defeated Mike Quackenbush at the conclusion of a six-month long, twelve-person tournament.

Like most professional wrestling championships, the title is won via the result of a scripted match. Since the founding of the promotion in 2002 and before the Chikara Grand Championship was created, Chikara promoted only the Chikara Campeonatos de Parejas, a tag team championship, and the Chikara Young Lions Cup, a championship for rookies, but did not have a major singles championship until an announcement regarding the creation of the Grand Championship was made in February 2011. On March 14, 2013, Chikara announced that in the future the title would be defended at every event held by the promotion. This was later negated following Mike Quackenbush's takeover as Director of Fun and on August 1, 2014, he announced a three-point system to determine contendership for the title, similar to the system used for the Campeonatos de Parejas. Under the system, wrestlers need to accumulate three back-to-back wins in order to be eligible to challenge for the title.

Overall, there have been nine reigns shared among eight wrestlers. One female wrestler, Princess KimberLee, has held the title. With the win, KimberLee became the first female wrestler to hold the top title in a major non-female promotion.

== History ==
=== 12 Large: Summit ===
On February 3, 2011, Chikara's new Director of Fun Wink Vavasseur announced that the promotion would be determining their first ever singles champion, nine years after the promotion was founded in 2002. Being new in his job, Vavasseur asked the Chikara roster to cast their vote on who should get to compete for the title with the only provision being that a wrestler cannot vote for themselves. For the next two months wrestlers such as Vin Gerard, UltraMantis Black, Green Ant, Brodie Lee and Icarus pleaded for votes on Chikara's official website. While most of Chikara's top rudo (villainous) stable Bruderschaft des Kreuzes (BDK) seemed united behind their leader Claudio Castagnoli, who had ordered his stablemates to vote for him, BDK member Sara Del Rey also asked for votes for herself.

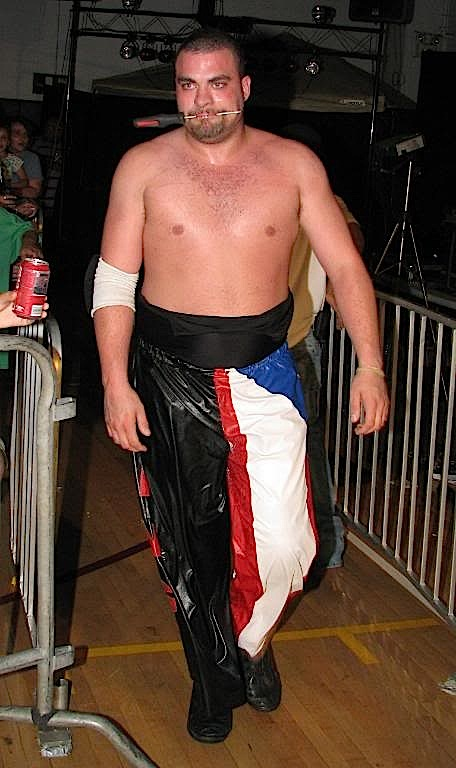
Eddie Kingston, winner of the 12 Large: Summit and the inaugural Chikara Grand Champion

On April 21, Vavasseur announced the result of the vote. Castagnoli had received the most votes, getting five votes from his seven stablemates. The others qualified were Jigsaw with three votes and Amasis, Brodie Lee, Eddie Kingston, Fire Ant, Hallowicked, Icarus, Mike Quackenbush, Sara Del Rey, UltraMantis Black and Vin Gerard, all with two votes. Vavasseur then revealed that the twelve wrestlers would then be divided into two blocks in a round-robin tournament, starting on May 21. On April 11, Chikara Wrestle Factory graduate and former Chikara Young Lions Cup Champion Larry Sweeney committed suicide. On April 29, Chikara announced that the tournament to determine the promotion's first ever singles champion would be named 12 Large: Summit, after Sweeney's catchphrase and finishing maneuver. On May 10, Chikara revealed the tournament's block structure and rules; each match in the tournament had a 60-minute time limit, a win was worth two points and a draw one point. The top wrestler from each block would then face each other on November 13 to determine the first ever Chikara singles champion.

On May 16, Vavasseur announced that Amasis had suffered an injury, which would force him out of the tournament. He then gave Chikara's fans the right to vote one of his Osirian Portal stablemates, Hieracon or Ophidian, to take his place. On June 18, Vavasseur announced that Ophidian had won the vote and would get the vacant spot in the tournament. Meanwhile, also Brodie Lee was sidelined with an injury and was forced to pull out of his match with Eddie Kingston on June 26, giving Kingston two points via forfeit. Lee was, however, given the opportunity to rejoin the tournament later, but never did make his return, forfeiting the rest of his matches. Jigsaw started the tournament on the sidelines, but returned at the July 30 event. On July 25, Ophidian announced that he had broken his jaw and would be forced to forfeit his match with Icarus on July 31. On August 27, Claudio Castagnoli became the first person eliminated from contention in the tournament, after being defeated by Icarus. Following the event, Castagnoli signed a contract with WWE and was forced to forfeit his final match against Ophidian. On August 1, Chikara announced that the finals on November 13 would take place on the promotion's first ever live internet pay-per-view High Noon. When the event's poster was revealed on August 29, the championship's name was at the same time revealed as the Chikara Grand Championship. On October 7, Mike Quackenbush secured the top spot in Block A with a win over Sara Del Rey. The following day, Eddie Kingston won Block B, when Jigsaw defeated the only man who could have threatened his number one spot, UltraMantis Black. On November 13 at High Noon, Kingston defeated Quackenbush to win the 12 Large: Summit and become the inaugural Chikara Grand Champion.

Final standings
Block A		Block B	
Mike Quackenbush	8	Eddie Kingston	8
Icarus	6	Fire Ant	6
Hallowicked	6	Jigsaw	6
Sara Del Rey	6	UltraMantis Black	6
Ophidian	2	Vin Gerard	4
Claudio Castagnoli	2	Brodie Lee	0

Block A	Castagnoli	Del Rey	Hallowicked	Icarus	Ophidian	Quackenbush
Castagnoli	X	Del Rey (13:15)	Castagnoli (14:34)	Icarus (12:45)	Ophidian (forfeit)	Quackenbush (19:59)
Del Rey	Del Rey (13:15)	X	Hallowicked (11:56)	Del Rey (13:56)	Del Rey (13:59)	Quackenbush (15:00)
Hallowicked	Castagnoli (14:34)	Hallowicked (11:56)	X	Icarus (15:16)	Hallowicked (14:28)	Hallowicked (18:50)
Icarus	Icarus (12:45)	Del Rey (13:56)	Icarus (15:16)	X	Icarus (forfeit)	Quackenbush (6:59)
Ophidian	Ophidian (forfeit)	Del Rey (13:59)	Hallowicked (14:28)	Icarus (forfeit)	X	Quackenbush (17:31)
Quackenbush	Quackenbush (19:59)	Quackenbush (15:00)	Hallowicked (18:50)	Quackenbush (6:59)	Quackenbush (17:31)	X
Block B	Fire Ant	Gerard	Jigsaw	Kingston	Lee	UltraMantis
Fire Ant	X	Fire Ant (11:45)	Fire Ant (11:40)	Kingston (22:27)	Fire Ant (forfeit)	UltraMantis (12:46)
Gerard	Fire Ant (11:45)	X	Jigsaw (12:48)	Gerard (9:47)	Gerard (7:15)	UltraMantis (forfeit)
Jigsaw	Fire Ant (11:40)	Jigsaw (12:48)	X	Kingston (19:43)	Jigsaw (forfeit)	Jigsaw (12:13)
Kingston	Kingston (22:27)	Gerard (9:47)	Kingston (19:43)	X	Kingston (forfeit)	Kingston (11:56)
Lee	Fire Ant (forfeit)	Gerard (7:15)	Jigsaw (forfeit)	Kingston (forfeit)	X	UltraMantis (forfeit)
UltraMantis	UltraMantis (12:46)	UltraMantis (forfeit)	Jigsaw (12:13)	Kingston (11:56)	UltraMantis (forfeit)	X

Final
A1	Mike Quackenbush	Pin
B1	Eddie Kingston	17:52

== Reigns ==
Key
No.	Overall reign number
Reign	Reign number for the specific champion
Days	Number of days held
Defenses	Number of successful defenses

No.	Champion	Championship change			Reign statistics			Notes	Ref.
No.	Champion	Date	Event	Location	Reign	Days	Defenses	Notes	Ref.
1	Eddie Kingston	November 13, 2011	High Noon	Philadelphia, PA	1	924	13	Kingston defeated Mike Quackenbush in the finals of a 12-person tournament to become the inaugural champion. Kingston's 14th Title defense against Icarus at CHIKARA Aniversario: Never Compromise on June 2, 2013 ended in a No Contest	
2	Icarus	May 25, 2014	You Only Live Twice	Easton, PA	1	316	4		
3	Hallowicked	April 6, 2015	Afternoon Delight	London, England	1	243	6		
4	Princess KimberLee	December 5, 2015	Top Banana	Philadelphia, PA	1	177	5	Cashed in her Golden Opportunity she had won earlier in the night in the finals of the Challenge of the Immortals tournament with Los Ice Creams and Jervis Cottenbelly as Crown and Court	
5	Hallowicked	May 30, 2016	Aniversario: The Lost World	Glasgow, Scotland	2	213	7		
6	UltraMantis Black	December 29, 2016	Whatever Happened, Happened	Philadelphia, PA	1	93	2		
7	Juan Francisco de Coronado	April 1, 2017	Bad Wolf	Orlando, FL	1	497	13		
8	Mark Angelosetti	August 11, 2018	Chikarasaurus Rex: A Deadly Secret	Philadelphia, PA	1	237	0		
—	Dasher Hatfield	September 4, 2018	Chikara Wrestle Factory Press Conference	Philadelphia, PA		213	5	When Mark Angelosetti got legitimately injured, Chikara Director Of Fun Bryce Remsburg allowed Angelosetti choose an Interim Champion to defend the belt until he comes back. Angelosetti then chose Dasher Hatfield.	
9	Dasher Hatfield	April 5, 2019	Once Upon A Beginning	Jersey City, NJ	1	446	3	Hatfield defeated Mark Angelosetti in a ladder match.	
—	Deactivated	June 24, 2020	—	—	—	—	—	Deactivated when Chikara closed down.	

== Combined reigns ==
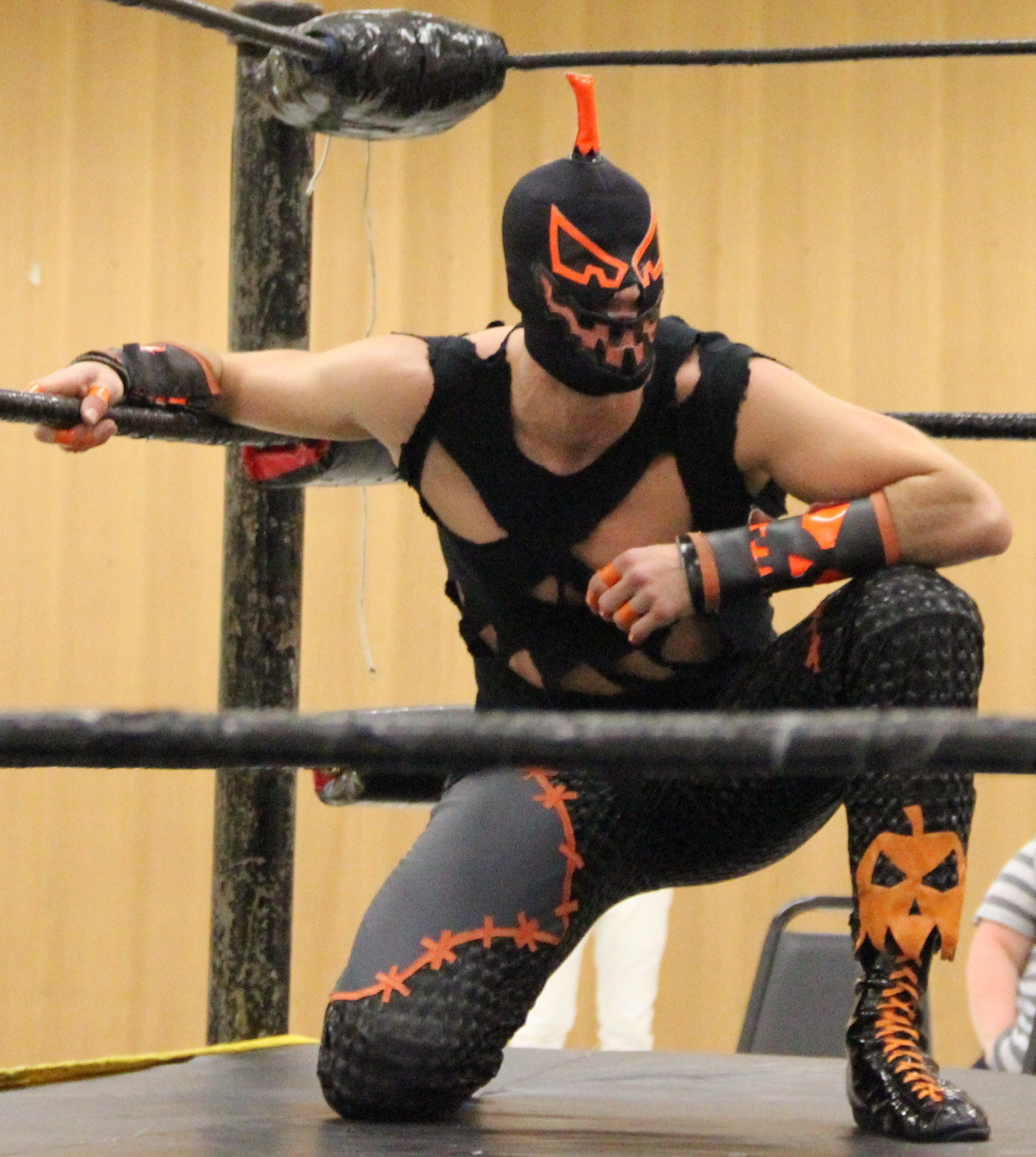
Hallowicked, the only two-time Chikara Grand Champion

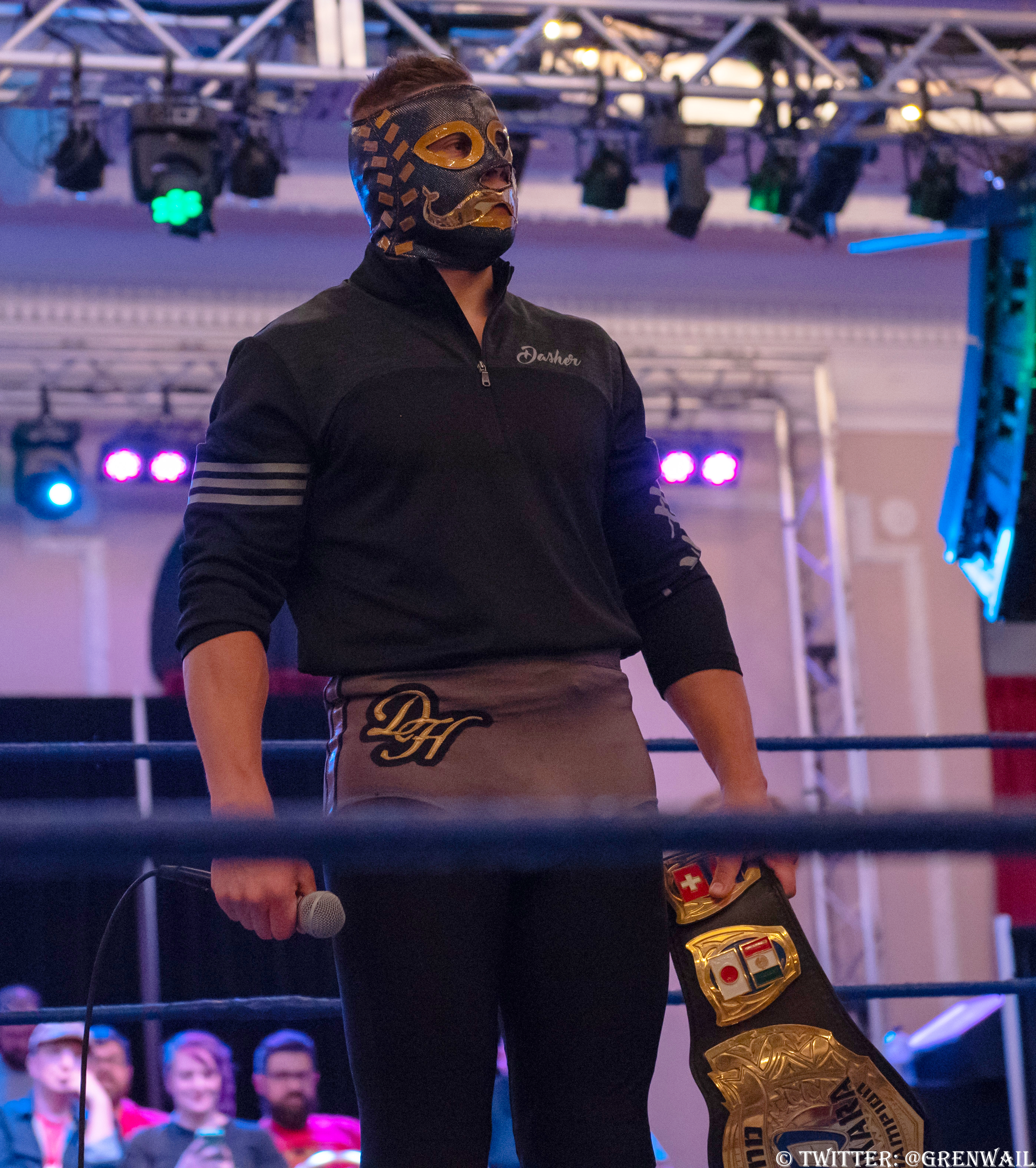
Dasher Hatfield, seen here holding the title, was the final person to hold the championship

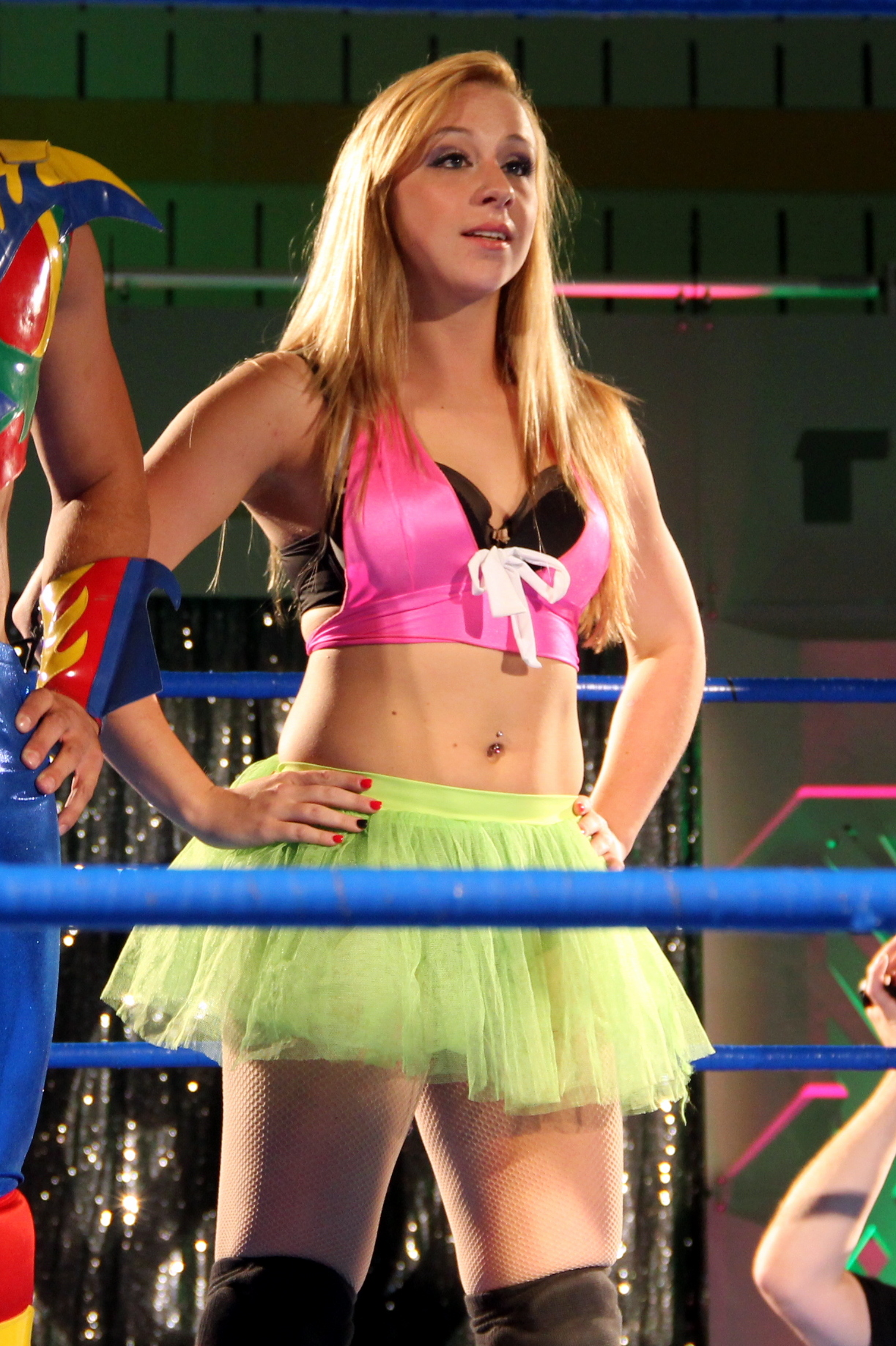
Princess KimberLee was the only woman to ever hold the title

Rank	Wrestler	No. of reigns	Combined defenses	Combined days
1	Eddie Kingston	1	14	924
2	Juan Francisco de Coronado	1	13	497
3	Hallowicked	2	13	456
4	Dasher Hatfield	1	3	446
5	Icarus	1	4	316
6	Mark Angelosetti	1	5	237
7	Princess KimberLee	1	5	177
8	UltraMantis Black	1	2	93

== See also ==
- Chikara Campeonatos de Parejas
- Chikara Young Lions Cup
