= Dasher Hatfield =

American professional wrestler

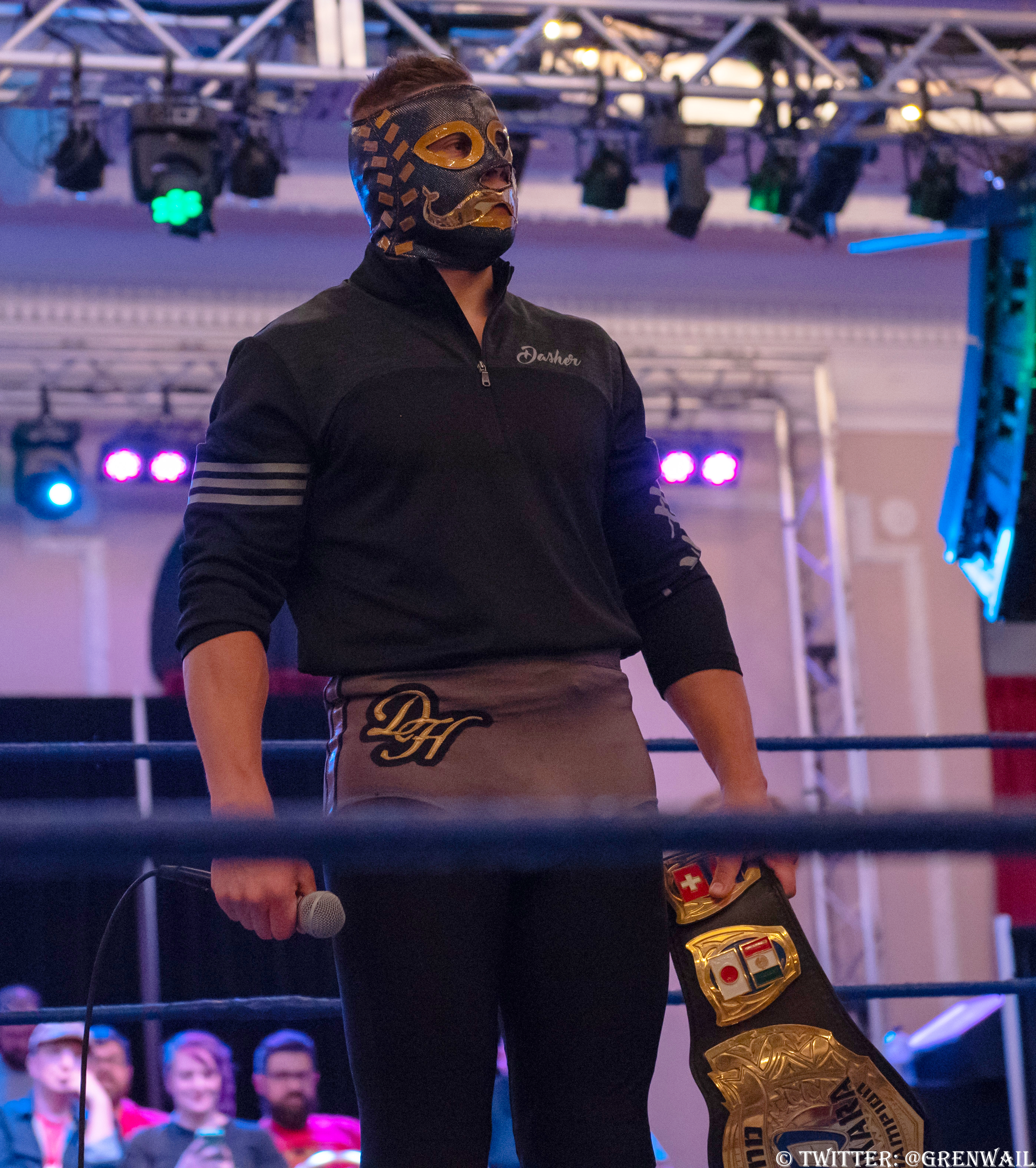
- Hatfield as CHIKARA Grand Champion in May 2019

Professional wrestling career
- Ring name(s): Dasher Hatfield; Create-A-Wrestler; MosCow the Communist Bovine; Ultimo Breakfast; A Very Good Professional Wrestler; Avery Good
- Billed height: 6 ft 0 in (1.83 m)
- Billed weight: 218 lb (99 kg)
- Billed from: Soviet Russia; Hoboken, New Jersey

A Very Good Professional Wrestler (born 1983 or 1982), formerly known by his ring name Dasher Hatfield, is an American professional wrestler. He is best known for his work in Chikara and its sister promotion Wrestling is Fun!.

== Professional wrestling career ==
=== Chikara ===
Hatfield debuted for Chikara at King of Trios 2007 in Barnesville, Pennsylvania under the ring name Create A Wrestler in which he lost to Chuck Taylor. The premise of the Create-A-Wrestler gimmick was that he did not have a defined character and the fans would get to suggest ideas for gimmicks for him. Because his identity was entirely up to the fans, he was billed from "Wherever You Want!" After having brief runs as MosCow the Communist Bovine and Ultimo Breakfast, he was reintroduced at Chikara Young Lions Cup VII as Hatfield, a wrestling baseball player. Hatfield formed a tag team called the Throwbacks with fellow Chikara superstar Sugar Dunkerton, a wrestling basketball player, who in 2011 failed to capture the Chikara Campeonatos de Parejas. Hatfield then joined Mark Angelosetti to form the new Throwbacks and successfully captured the Campeonatos De Parejas belts from Jigsaw and The Shard in 2014 until December where they lost the belts to The Devastation Corporation at Tomorrow Never Dies.

Hatfield was named one of the ten team captains for Chikara's Challenge of the Immortals tournament. Hatfield picked Mark Angelosetti, then-Chikara Grand Champion Icarus and Chikara Young Lions Cup Champion Heidi Lovelace. This team would be named "Dasher's Dugout".

=== The Unmasking of Dasher Hatfield and end of character ===
The unmasking of Dasher Hatfield
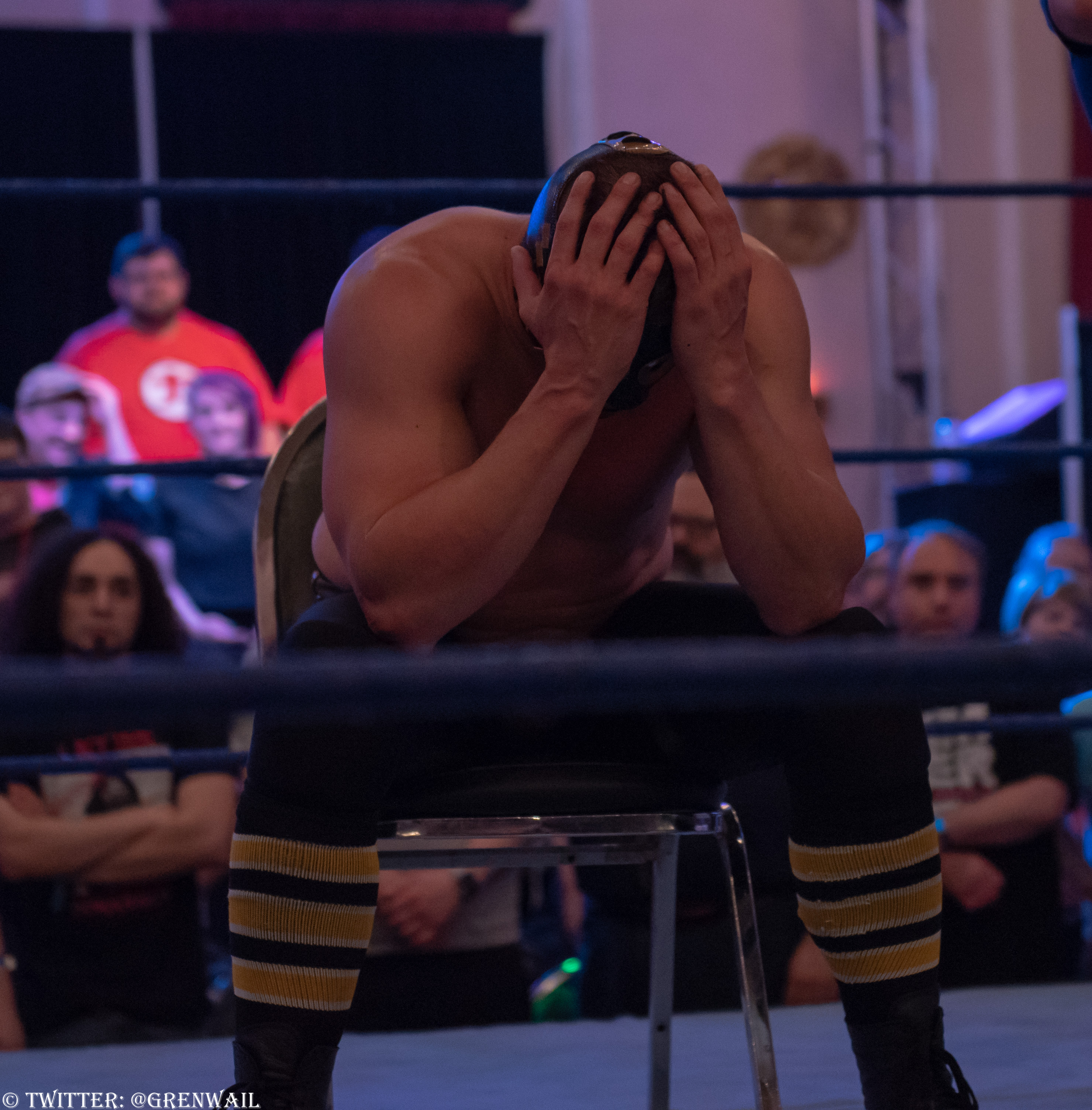
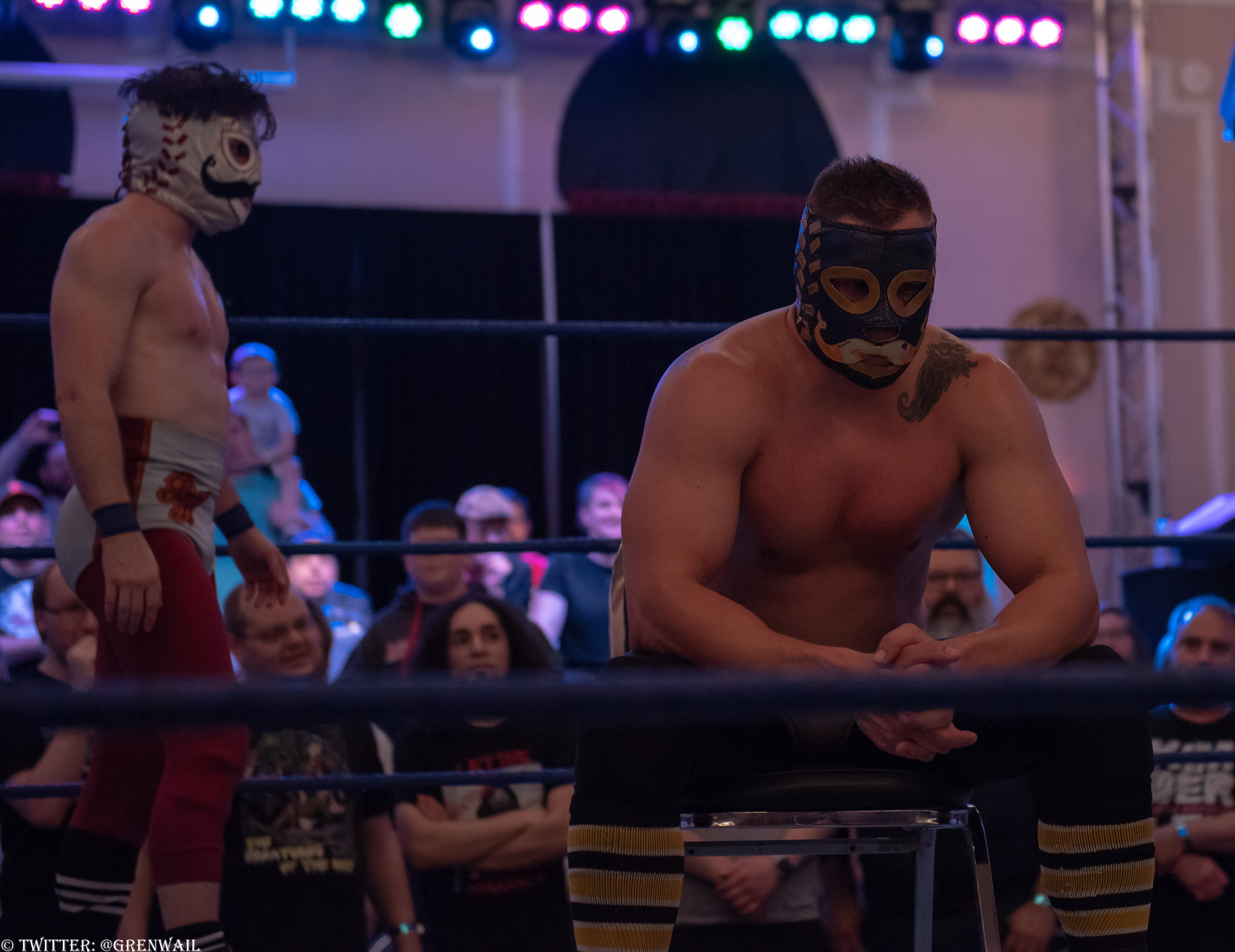
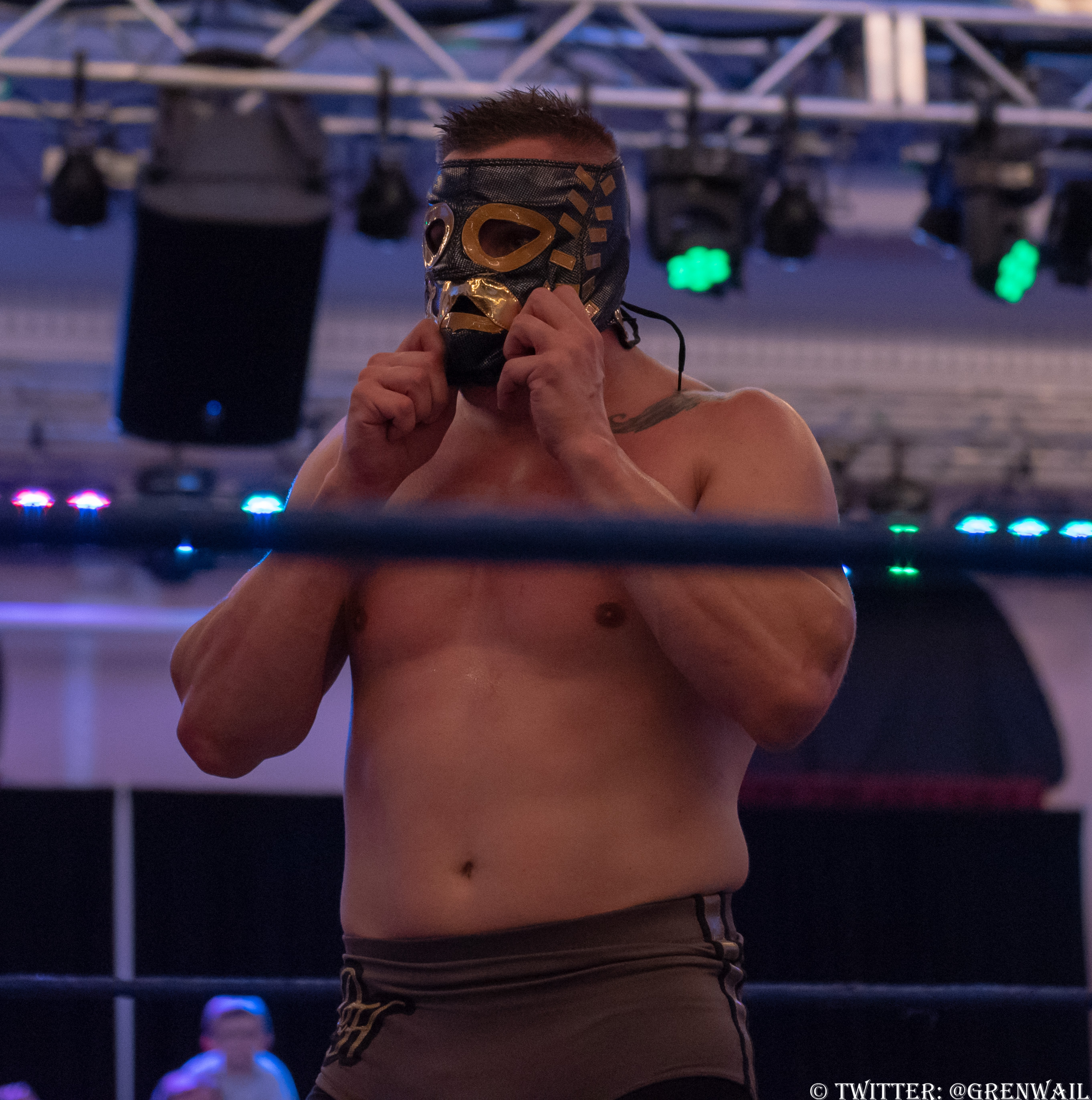
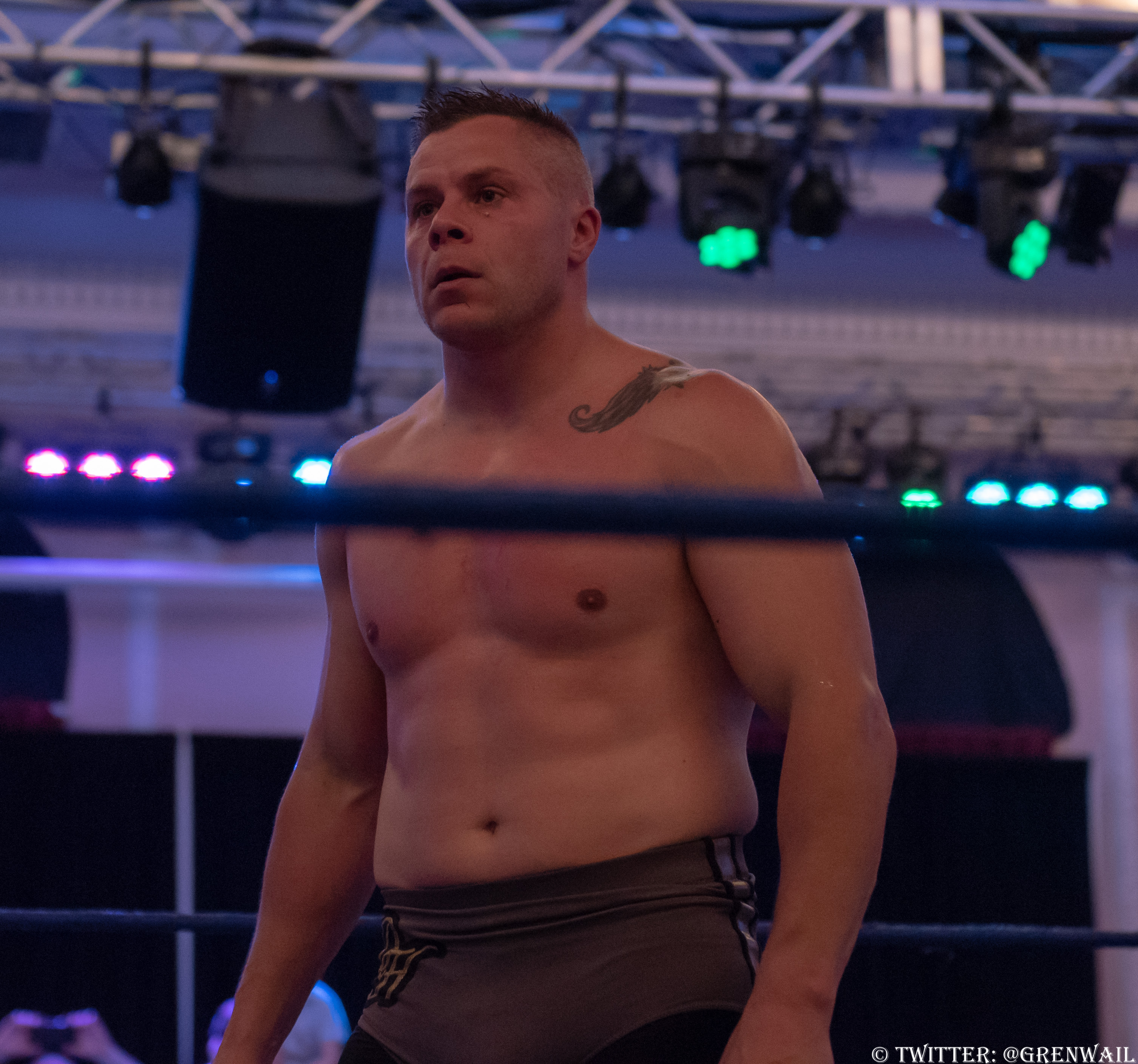

On May 26, 2019 at Aniversario: Scotch Mist, he was defeated by his (kayfabe) son Boomer Hatfield in a mask vs. mask match. Hatfield left Chikara soon after the promotion shut down on June 24, 2020, resulting in him being the final Grand Champion. He later announced on 18 July 2019 that he was changing his ring name to A Very Good Professional Wrestler.

== Championships and accomplishments ==
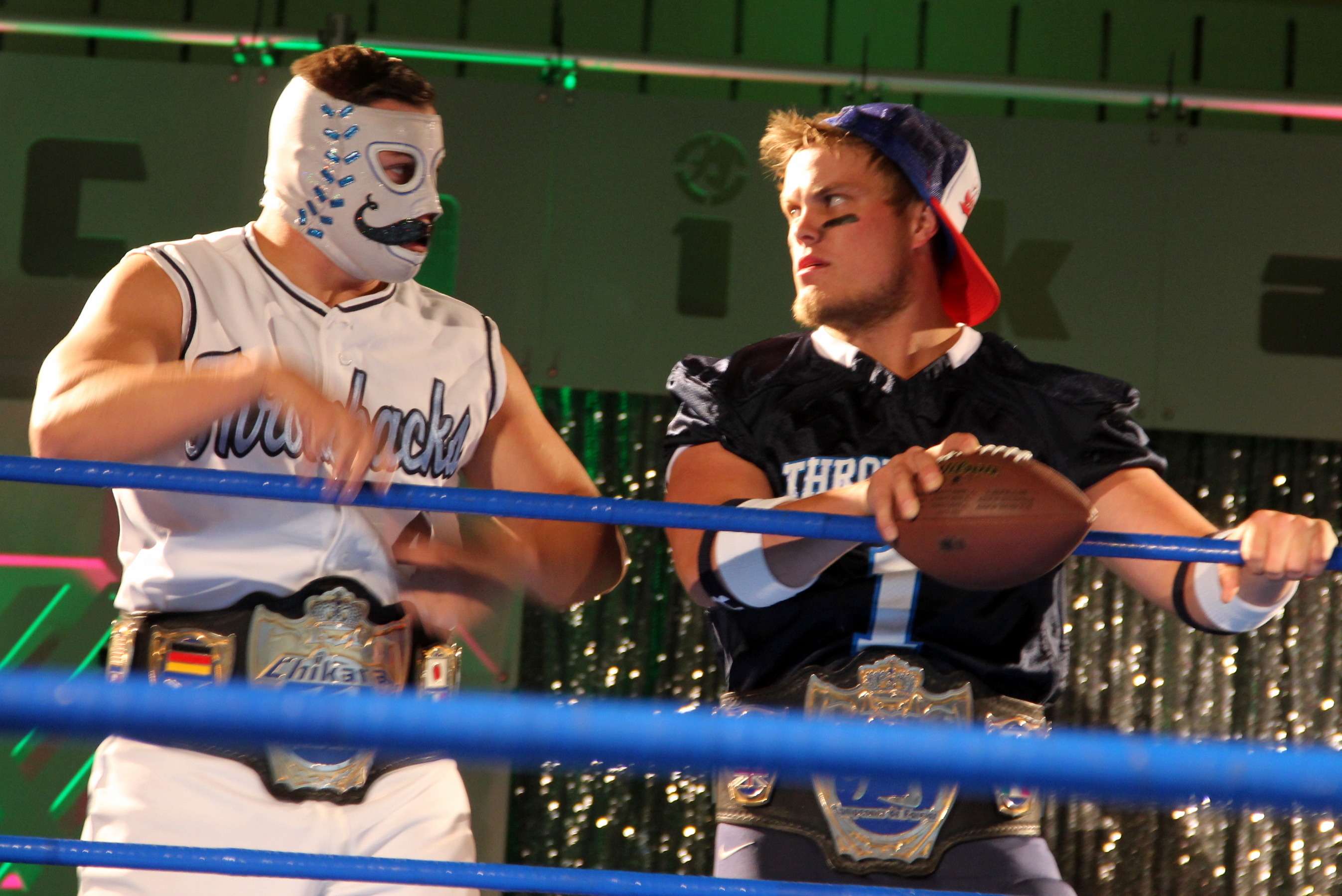
Hatfield and Mark Angelosetti as the Chikara Campeones de Parejas

- Camp Leapfrog
  - Camp Leapfrog Championship (1 time, current)
- Chikara
  - Chikara Campeonatos de Parejas (1 time) — with Mark Angelosetti
  - Chikara Grand Championship (1 time)
  - Interim Chikara Grand Championship (1 time)
  - Tag World Grand Prix (2018)
  - Torneo Cibernetico (2016)
- East Coast Wrestling Association
  - ECWA Super 8 Tournament (2020)
- Pro Wrestling Illustrated
  - Ranked No. 311 of the top 500 singles wrestlers in the PWI 500 in 2021
- Wrestling is Fun!
  - Tag World Grand Prix (2014) — with Mark Angelosetti

=== Luchas de Apuestas record ===
Winner (wager)	Loser (wager)	Location	Event	Date	Notes
Boomer Hatfield (mask)	Dasher Hatfield (mask)	Chicago, Illinois	Aniversario: Scotch Mist	May 26, 2019	
Avery Good and Dan Champion (Avery's mask)	Boomer Hatfield and Shea McCoy (Boomer's mask)	Worcester, Massachusetts	Pizza Party Wrestling Big Eyes, Bigger Dreams	December 30, 2021	(Note: 2 out of 3 falls match. If Avery Good's team lost, he would have been forced to put his mask back on and finish his career as Dasher Hatfield.)
