= Vin Gerard =

American professional wrestler (born 1986)

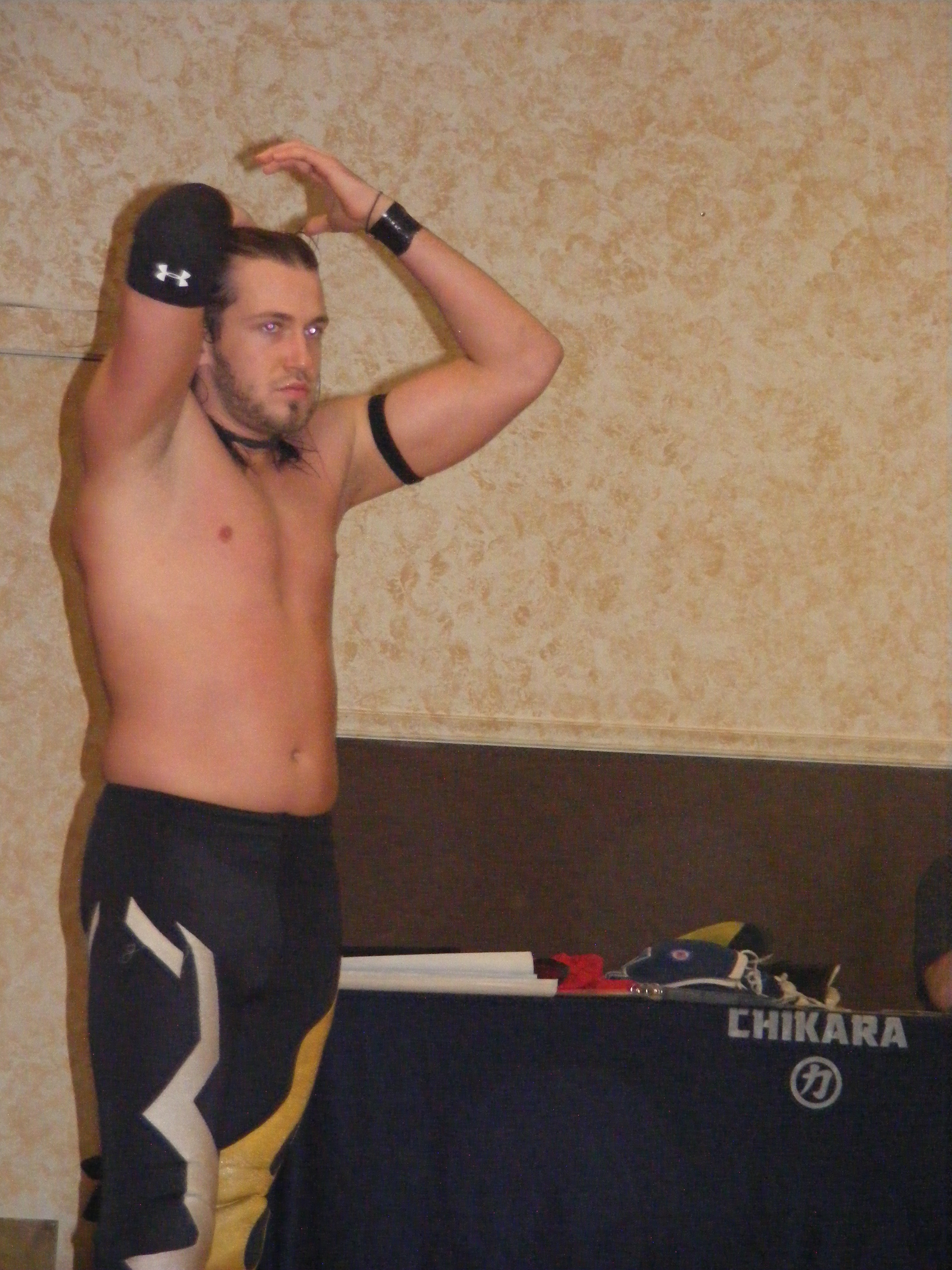

Personal information
- Born: Vince Gerard Durling; February 4, 1986 (age 40) Scranton, Pennsylvania, United States

Professional wrestling career
- Ring name(s): Equinox; Vin Badd; Vin Gerard
- Billed height: 5 ft 10 in (1.78 m)
- Billed weight: 164 lb (74 kg)
- Billed from: Coal City, Pennsylvania
- Trained by: Mike Quackenbush; Chris Hero; Claudio Castagnoli
- Debut: May 20, 2005
- Retired: February 26, 2012

Vince Gerard Durling (born February 4, 1986) is an American former professional wrestler. He is best known for his tenure in Chikara, where he was a one time Young Lions Cup Champion. Currently he is the owner/operator of Independentwrestling.tv.

== Professional wrestling career ==
=== Chikara ===
==== Equinox (2005–2007) ====
After training in Chikara's Wrestle Factory school, Durling made his debut on May 20, 2005, as the fan favorite masked wrestler Equinox, a student of Mexican masked wrestler and Chikara alumnus Skayde. Equinox soon began to show an impressive run early on and even made it past experienced Chikara wrestlers in an unsuccessful attempt to win the Young Lions Cup. However, he suffered a concussion at the Negative Balance event at the hands of Team F.I.S.T. (Gran Akuma and Icarus), which put him on the injured list for a while. Upon his return, Equinox began to occasionally team with fellow masked wrestler Angel de Fuego and they became known as Pareja Solar ("Solar Partners" in Spanish).

At the 2005 Tag World Grand Prix, Angel no-showed the event, an occurrence that would later become a running joke, leaving Equinox alone for the tournament. To compensate for his partner's absence, Hydra was named as a replacement partner for Equinox, though they lost in the first round to the Grand Prix's eventual winners Chris Hero and Claudio Castagnoli. After the Grand Prix, Pareja Solar split and Equinox returned to singles competition, including an unsuccessful attempt at winning the Young Lions Cup from then champion Arik Cannon, during which he suffered a second concussion near the end 2006.

The first half of 2007 was fairly uneventful for Equinox until he scored an upset over the much larger Brodie Lee in Lee's Chikara debut, although Lee returned a couple of months later and easily defeated Equinox in a rematch. Equinox rebounded and scored another major upset, this time by pinning Chris Hero in a tag team match during Invaders weekend. Hero then began feuding with Equinox, which culminated in a hair vs. mask match that Hero won. After the match, Hero exposed Equinox as a Wrestle Factory drop-out who donned a mask and conned Skayde to get ahead in the wrestling business. After his unmasking, Equinox began using his real name (Vin Gerard) and became a villain while also adopting both a new wrestling style and an entirely new attire consisting of black tights with slight variations of the fire and ice symbols from his Equinox attire and a bandanna. Gerard later elaborated on his situation with Skayde, noting that he had threatened to report Skayde to the border patrol if he did not pretend Gerard was his student. Soon after his unmasking, Gerard was banished from the locker room, robbing him of any entrance music and forcing him to enter the arena though the back door of every venue Chikara ran in.

==== Young Lions Cup and The UnStable (2008–2011) ====
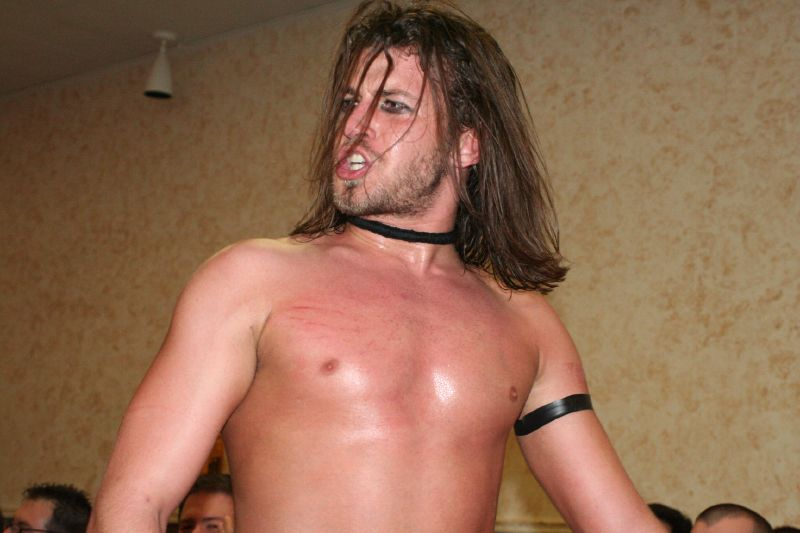
Gerard in 2008

In 2008, Gerard gained significant success early on with several high-profile wins before beginning a heated feud with The Colony. At the Young Lions Cup tournament on June 15, Fire Ant of The Colony defeated Gerard for the Cup in a match that garnered significant praise from both the company and fans. However, the following month on July 13, Gerard gained revenge by defeating Fire Ant in a rematch for the Cup after utilizing the cup itself as a weapon, giving Gerard his first championship. During his run as champion, Gerard utilized the cup as a piggy bank of sorts to collect money from fans. In addition, Gerard successfully managed to manipulate former fan favorite Shane Storm into aligning with him, effectively renaming him STIGMA and changing his mask from its usual comedic design to a more evil and twisted version. Gerard and STIGMA would feud with The Colony until September 7, when the two aligned with the returning Colin Delaney to form the UnStable, and thus evening the numbers of both groups. At the 2008 Tag World Grand Prix, Gerard and STIGMA represented the UnStable and defeated Swi$$ Money Holding (Claudio Castagnoli and Marc Roudin) in the first round before falling to their rivals The Colony in the semi-finals. The Colony would then go on to win the Grand Prix.

On December 14, Gerard's reign as champion came to halt as a controversial match with Jimmy Olsen, who was wrestling under Gerard's own Equinox mask and gimmick in an attempt to play mind games with him, resulted in the Cup being held up by Chikara Director of Fun Leonard Chikarason. In the beginning of 2009, Gerard faced Olsen once again but this time in a ladder match to determine the Young Lions Cup champion, which Olsen won to become the official champion. The UnStable entered the 2009 King of Trios, where they advanced to the semifinals, before losing to Team Uppercut (Bryan Danielson, Claudio Castagnoli and Dave Taylor).

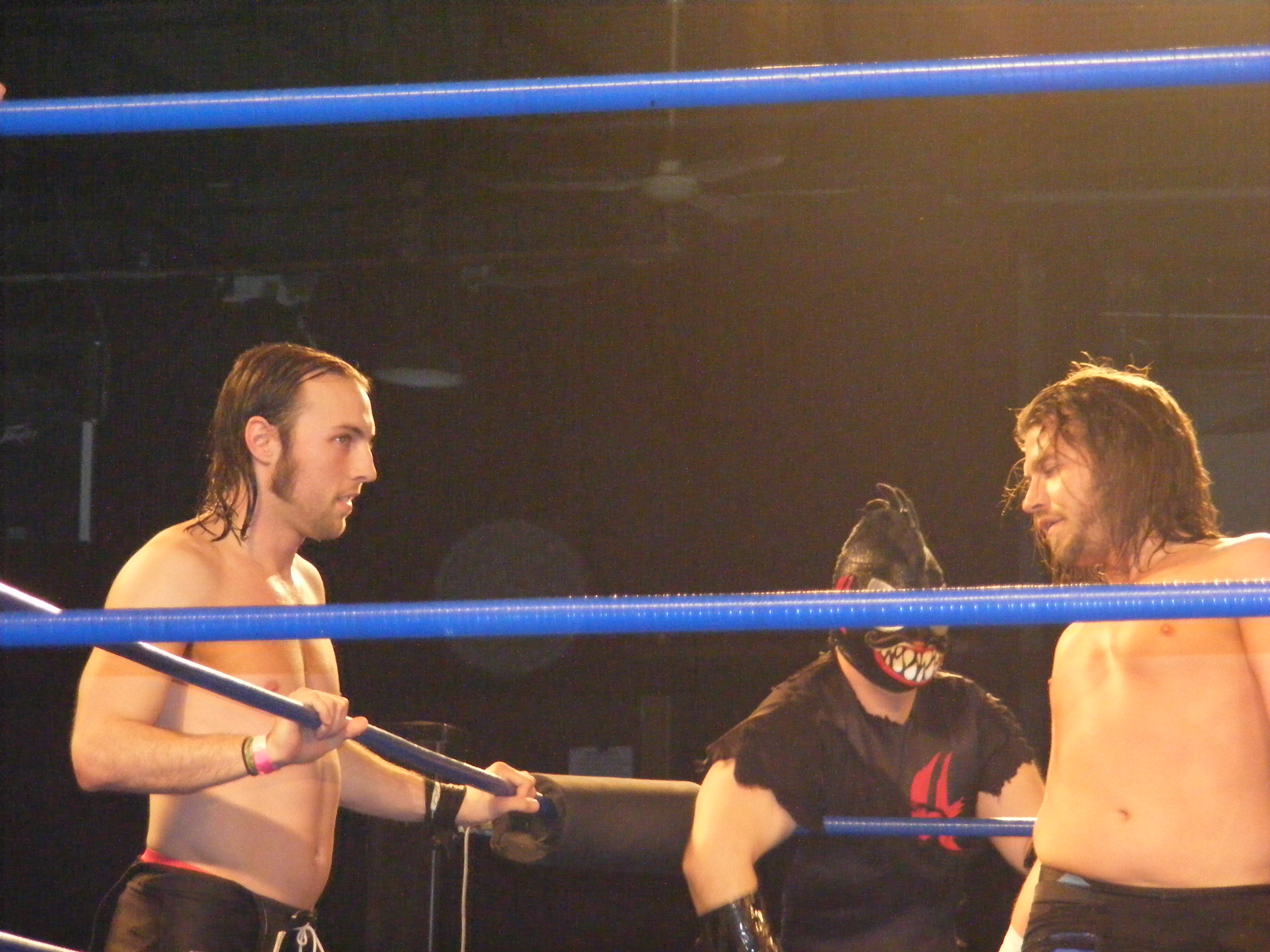
Gerard (right) with Colin Delaney (left) and STIGMA (center) as The UnStable

In the latter half of 2009 The UnStable started a long losing streak, which included a first round loss in the 2010 King of Trios, during which Gerard and STIGMA began showing signs of a face turn by making sure that Amasis was fine after their match against him and Ophidian on March 20. Gerard faced Amasis again, this time in a singles match, on May 23 and managed to score his first victory in six months only to learn later that Colin Delaney had interfered in the match. In a blog entry on Chikara's official website Gerard attacked Delaney, calling him selfish and warned him not to interfere in his and STIGMA's deciding match against The Osirian Portal on June 27. On June 27 at Faded Scars and Lines Delaney interfered in the match and helped Gerard and STIGMA defeat the Osirian Portal. After teasing dissension, all three members of the UnStable united and attacked Amasis and Ophidian. On July 26 at Chikarasaurus Rex: King of Show the Osirian Portal gained a measure of revenge on the UnStable, when they teamed with Drake Younger, who also had a history with Gerard and STIGMA, and defeated Gerard, STIGMA and Delaney in a six-man tag team match. Even though the UnStable had seemingly reunited, tension rose again during the Young Lions Cup VIII weekend, when Delaney eliminated STIGMA from a 30 Man Countdown Showdown match. On September 19, 2010, at Through Savage Progress Cuts the Jungle Line the UnStable faced the Future is Now (Equinox, Helios and Jigsaw) in a six-man tag team match. During the match Delaney turned on the UnStable and re–formed his tag team with Olsen, after which Gerard got his team disqualified by low blowing the former Olsen Twins. On October 24, in the first match between the UnStable and the Olsen Twins, Gerard picked up the victory for his team by forcing Delaney Olsen to submit. The following week Gerard and STIGMA made their first tour of Japan with Osaka Pro Wrestling. The UnStable had a rematch with the Olsen Twins on November 21, this time with the Olsens coming out victorious. At the season nine finale on December 12, Delaney Olsen defeated Gerard in a singles match. In February 2011, the UnStable began feuding with 3.0 (Scott Parker and Shane Matthews). The feud ended on May 21, when 3.0 defeated the UnStable in a tag team match, where the losing team had to split up.

==== Feud with Eddie Kingston and retirement (2011–2012) ====
After going solo, Gerard entered the 12 Large: Summit to determine the first ever Chikara Grand Champion. After one win and two losses, Gerard was eliminated from contention in the tournament as Eddie Kingston won four straight matches, winning the block. This led to Gerard forfeiting his match with UltraMantis Black so he could concentrate on Kingston, and on October 30, Gerard defeated the previously undefeated Kingston via submission in the final round-robin match of the tournament. After the match Gerard hit Kingston in the knee with a steel chair, putting his spot in the finals into question. To further the storyline, Gerard's profile was removed from Chikara's official website following the event. Afterwards, Gerard appeared on YouTube and threatened to reveal secrets about Chikara, unless he was reinstated. Gerard returned to Chikara on January 28, 2012, having a confrontation with Grand Champion Eddie Kingston, who then ordered Chikara's Director of Fun, Wink Vavasseur, to reinstate Gerard so he could get his hands on him. Following the event, Gerard's profile was put back on Chikara's website. On February 26, Gerard challenged Kingston for the Grand Championship in a title vs. career match, but was unsuccessful in his attempt to win the title and was forced to retire as a result.

== Personal life ==
Since 2016, Durling has owned and operated the streaming website Independentwrestling.TV, one of the leading streaming services for professional wrestling.

== Championships and accomplishments ==
- Chikara
  - Young Lions Cup (1 time)

=== Lucha de Apuesta record ===
Winner (wager)	Loser (wager)	Location	Event	Date	Notes
Chris Hero (hair)	Equinox (mask)	Hellertown, Pennsylvania	The Sordid Perils of Everyday Existence	November 17, 2007	
