= You Only Live Once =

You Only Live Once may refer to:

== Film ==
- You Only Live Once (1937 film), an American crime drama film
- You Only Live Once (1952 film), a German comedy film
- You Only Live Once (2017 film), an Argentine action film
- Zindagi Na Milegi Dobara, or You Only Live Once, a 2011 Indian Hindi-language buddy road comedy-drama film

== Music ==
- Man lebt nur einmal! (You Only Live Once!), a waltz by Johann Strauss II
- "You Only Live Once" (song), by The Strokes, 2006
- "You Only Live Once", a song by Suicide Silence from their 2011 album The Black Crown
- "You Only Live Once", a song by Unsolved Mysteries from the album Tragic Trouble

== Other ==
- You Only Live Once (book), a 2016 book written by Jason Vitug
- You Only Live Once (video game), a 2010 Flash game by Marcus Richter

== See also ==
- YOLO (aphorism), an acronym for you only live once
- Yolo (disambiguation)
- You Only Live Twice (disambiguation)
