= You Only Live Twice =

You Only Live Twice may refer to:

== James Bond ==
- You Only Live Twice (novel), a 1964 James Bond novel by Ian Fleming
  - You Only Live Twice (film), a 1967 film based on the novel
    - You Only Live Twice (soundtrack), the soundtrack album from the film
    - "You Only Live Twice" (song), a 1967 Nancy Sinatra song from the James Bond film of the same name
  - You Only Live Twice (adventure), an adventure published in 1984 for the role-playing game James Bond 007

== Music ==
- You Only Live Twice (Tim Brummett album), a 2005 album by Tim Brummett
- You Only Live Twice (Pain album), a 2011 album by Pain
- You Only Live Twice: The Audio Graphic Novel, a 2010 album by MF Grimm
- You Only Live 2wice, a 2017 album by Freddie Gibbs

== Television ==
- "You Only Live Twice", 2point4 children series 4, episode 6 (1994)
- "You Only Live Twice", Runaway Bay season 1, episode 6 (1992)

== Other uses ==
- Chikara You Only Live Twice, a 2014 professional wrestling event

== See also ==
- You Only Die Twice (disambiguation)
- You Only Live Once (disambiguation)
