= Chikara Tomorrow Never Dies =

2014 professional wrestling event

Tomorrow Never Dies
- Promotional poster featuring Deucalion
- Promotion: Chikara
- Date: December 6, 2014
- City: Philadelphia, Pennsylvania
- Venue: 2300 Arena

Pay-per-view chronology
← Previous; You Only Live Twice	Next → Last

Tomorrow Never Dies was a professional wrestling internet pay-per-view (iPPV) event produced by the Chikara promotion, that took place on December 6, 2014, at the 2300 Arena in Philadelphia, Pennsylvania. The event marked Chikara's season 14 finale and was the promotion's sixth iPPV. Tomorrow Never Dies was also Chikara's first event at the former ECW Arena since the High Noon iPPV in November 2011. Much like several other Chikara events in 2014, including the previous iPPV You Only Live Twice, the event was named after a James Bond film of the same name.

== Background ==
Tomorrow Never Dies featured seven professional wrestling matches involving different wrestlers from pre-existing scripted feuds, plots, and storylines that played out on Chikara's monthly house shows and on blog entries written on the promotion's official website. Wrestlers portray villains (rudos in Chikara) or heroes (tecnicos in Chikara) as they follow a series of events that build tension, and culminate in a wrestling match or series of matches. Chikara follows lucha libre traditions and is known for its colorful characters and gimmicks and family-friendly content.

The first match announced for the event saw Heidi Lovelace take on Missile Assault Ant in the finals of the Young Lions Cup XI tournament. The first round and semifinals of the tournament were held by Chikara's sister promotion, Wrestling is Fun! (WiF!). Missile Assault Ant earned his spot in the finals on October 11 by first defeating Argus in his first round match and then Donovan Dijak, Prakash Sabar, Race Jaxon, Rex Lawless and Shynron in a six-way elimination semifinal match. Lovelace, meanwhile, advanced to the finals on November 1 by first defeating Eddie Smooth in her first round match and then Arctic Rescue Ant, Joe Black, Kimber Lee, The Proletariat Boar of Moldova and Will Ferrara in her semifinal match, setting up the final match for Tomorrow Never Dies. On December 5, the final match was moved off the iPPV and onto a 40-minute pre-show taking place before the event.

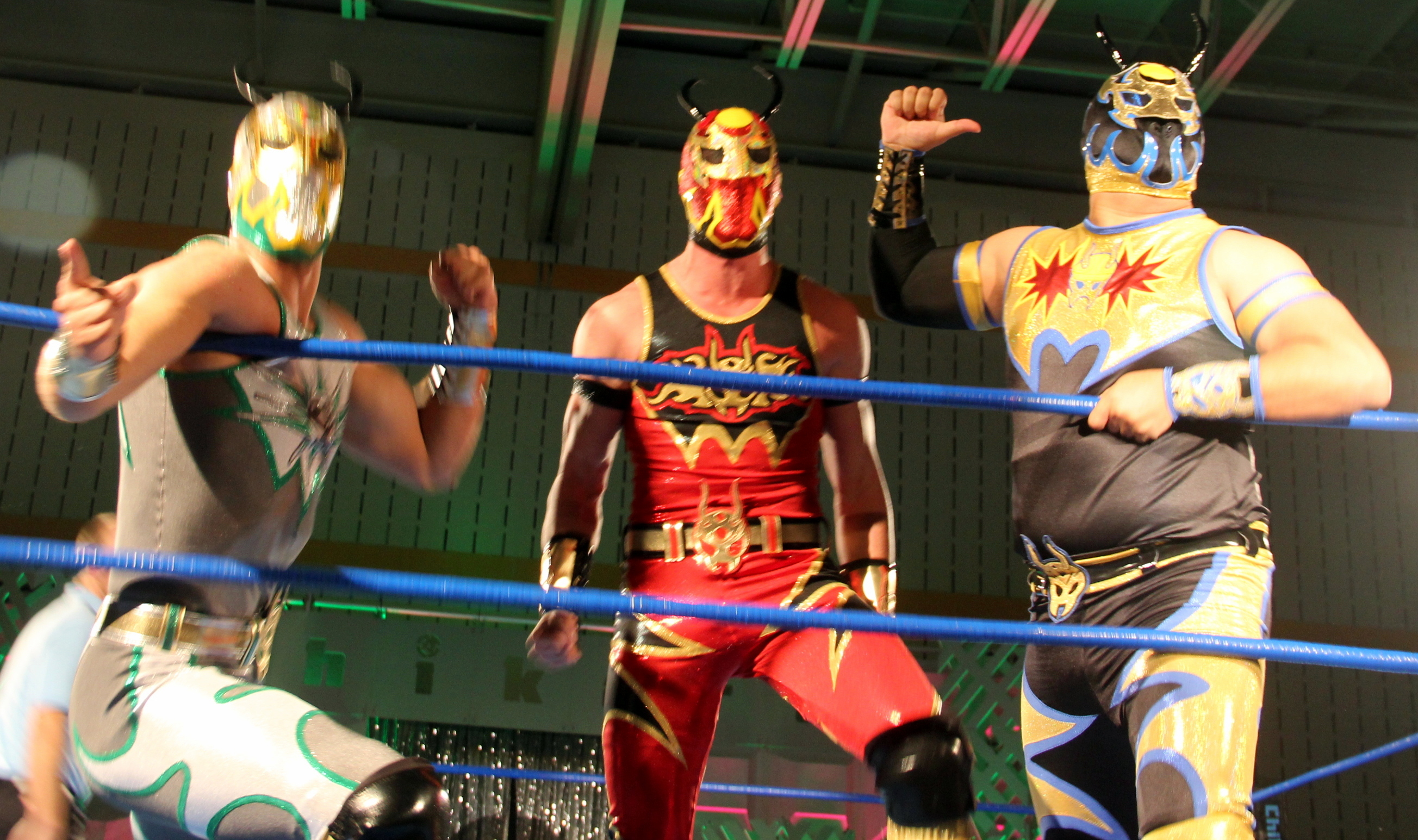
The Colony (Silver Ant, Fire Ant and Worker Ant) represented Chikara during the torneo cibernetico at Tomorrow Never Dies.

On November 7, Chikara announced that the annual torneo cibernetico would be taking place at Tomorrow Never Dies. Torneo cibernetico, which Chikara adopted from Mexican lucha libre, is a sixteen-man elimination tag team match, where there can be only one winner; meaning that after all members from one team have been eliminated, tag team partners from the other team may have to face each other to determine the winner. Chikara has held a torneo cibernetico annually since 2004, though in previous years it has headlined its own event in October. The previous torneo ciberneticos have served as a culmination point of each season's main storyline. These have included the rivalry between Jigsaw and Larry Sweeney in 2004, the rise of The Kings of Wrestling stable in 2007 and the rivalry between Chikara and Bruderschaft des Kreuzes (BDK) in 2010. On November 18, it was announced that the 2014 match would feature the main storyline of season 14, the rivalry between Chikara and the Flood, a villainous umbrella group made up of several rudo stables from Chikara's past years. Jakob Hammermeier and Worker Ant were announced as the captains of the Flood and Chikara teams, respectively. Worker Ant revealed his entire team on December 2. Hammermeier revealed his team two days later. Included in the Flood team was Soldier Ant, who had been replaced in The Colony by Worker Ant. After resigning from Chikara in April 2013 after being made to lead the Colony: Xtreme Force knockoff group, Soldier Ant made a surprise return to the promotion at the conclusion of the May 2014 iPPV You Only Live Twice, now as a rudo, affiliated with the Flood. Though Soldier Ant did not wrestle any official matches between his return and Tomorrow Never Dies, he entered a storyline rivalry with his former Colony stablemates, including costing Fire Ant, Silver Ant and Worker Ant their second round match in the 2014 King of Trios tournament.

On November 17, Chikara announced the main event of Tomorrow Never Dies, which would see Icarus taking on Deucalion. Deucalion made his debut at the conclusion of previous May's You Only Live Twice iPPV, when he was revealed as the leader of the Flood stable. Over the next months, Chikara started a storyline, where Deucalion began attacking wrestlers, who were all subsequently removed from the promotion's roster. His victims included Kobald, deviAnt, Estonian ThunderFrog and Archibald Peck. Throughout the storyline, Deucalion was presented as unstoppable until he was speared off his feet by Chikara Grand Champion Icarus on October 26. On November 16, Icarus confronted and challenged Deucalion to a match at Tomorrow Never Dies, which he accepted. On November 28, Chikara announced that the match would be taking place inside a steel cage, making it only the second match in the promotion's history to use the stipulation.

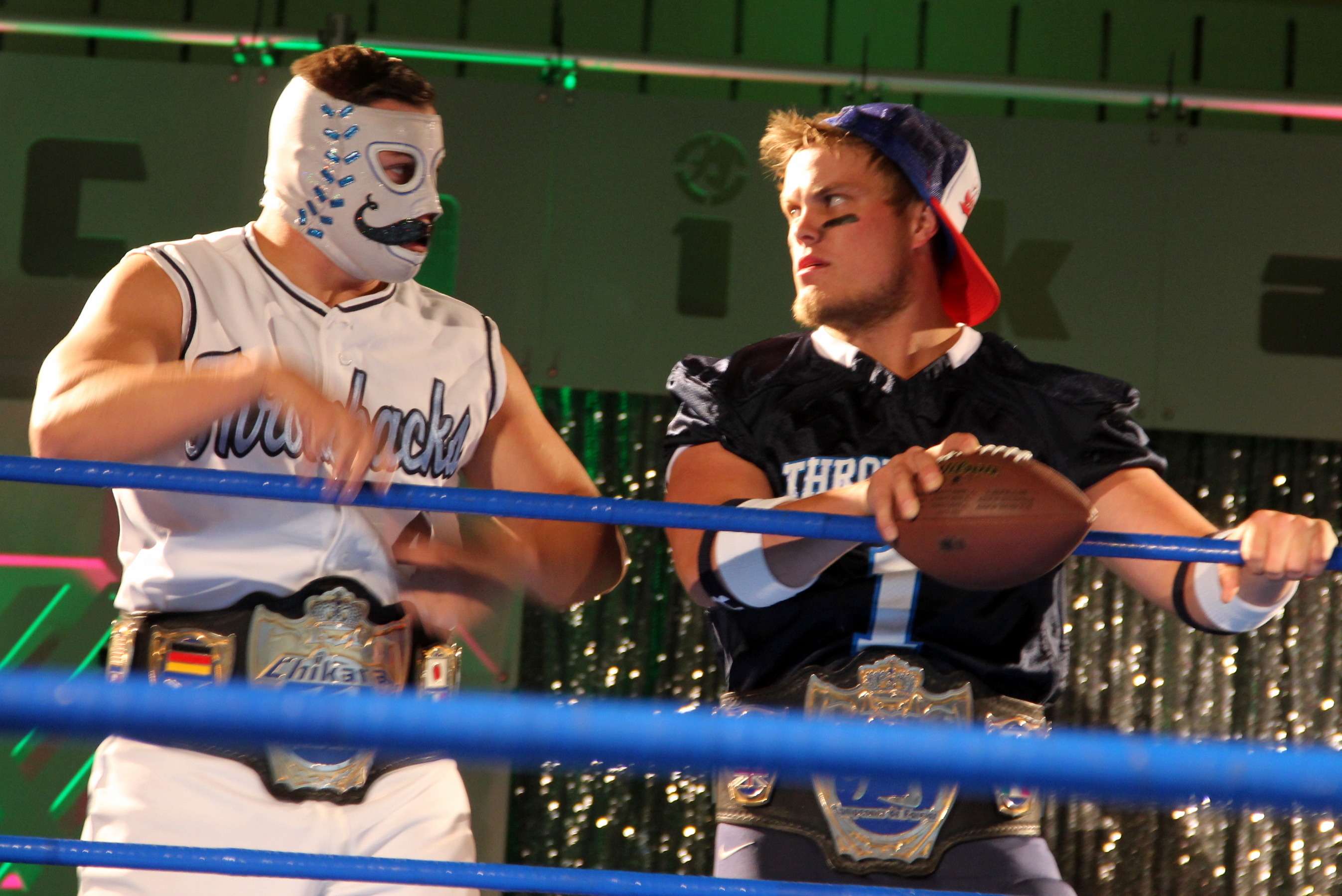
The Throwbacks (Dasher Hatfield and Mark Angelosetti) made their second defense of the Chikara Campeonatos de Parejas at Tomorrow Never Dies.

On November 19, Chikara announced the fourth match for the iPPV, where The Throwbacks (Dasher Hatfield and Mark Angelosetti) would defend the Chikara Campeonatos de Parejas against The Devastation Corporation (Blaster McMassive and Max Smashmaster). In Chikara, teams need three points, or three back-to-back wins, in order to be eligible to challenge for the promotion's tag team championship, the Campeonatos de Parejas. After winning the 2014 King of Trios alongside their Devastation Corporation and Flood stablemate Flex Rumblecrunch, McMassive and Smashmaster earned their title shot by obtaining their third point on November 16, the same day The Throwbacks made their first successful defense of the Campeonatos de Parejas against former two-time champions 3.0 (Scott Parker and Shane Matthews).

On November 21, Chikara announced the fifth match for Tomorrow Never Dies between Chikara original Eddie Kingston and Jimmy Jacobs, one of the leading figures of the Flood, billed as the one who organized the group for Deucalion. After losing the Grand Championship to Icarus at You Only Live Twice, Kingston turned on Chikara and joined the Flood, after Jacobs promised him the title in return for his help in the Flood's war with Chikara. Kingston even represented the Flood in the 2014 King of Trios, where he, Jacobs and Volgar made it to the semifinals. After the Flood had won the tournament through The Devastation Corporation, Jacobs announced he was ready to deliver Kingston the Grand Championship. However, after a plea from Icarus, where he claimed that the title would be worthless if the Flood won the war and Chikara was no more, Kingston turned on Jacobs and the Flood and rejoined Chikara. Afterwards, Kingston declared war on the Flood, specifically setting his sights on Jacobs and trying to prove himself worthy of the Grand Championship in the process.

The sixth match for the iPPV was also announced on November 21 and would see Ashley Remington and Juan Francisco de Coronado face off in the rubber match of their three match series against each other. Three days later, Chikara added a stipulation that the match could only be won with a German suplex.

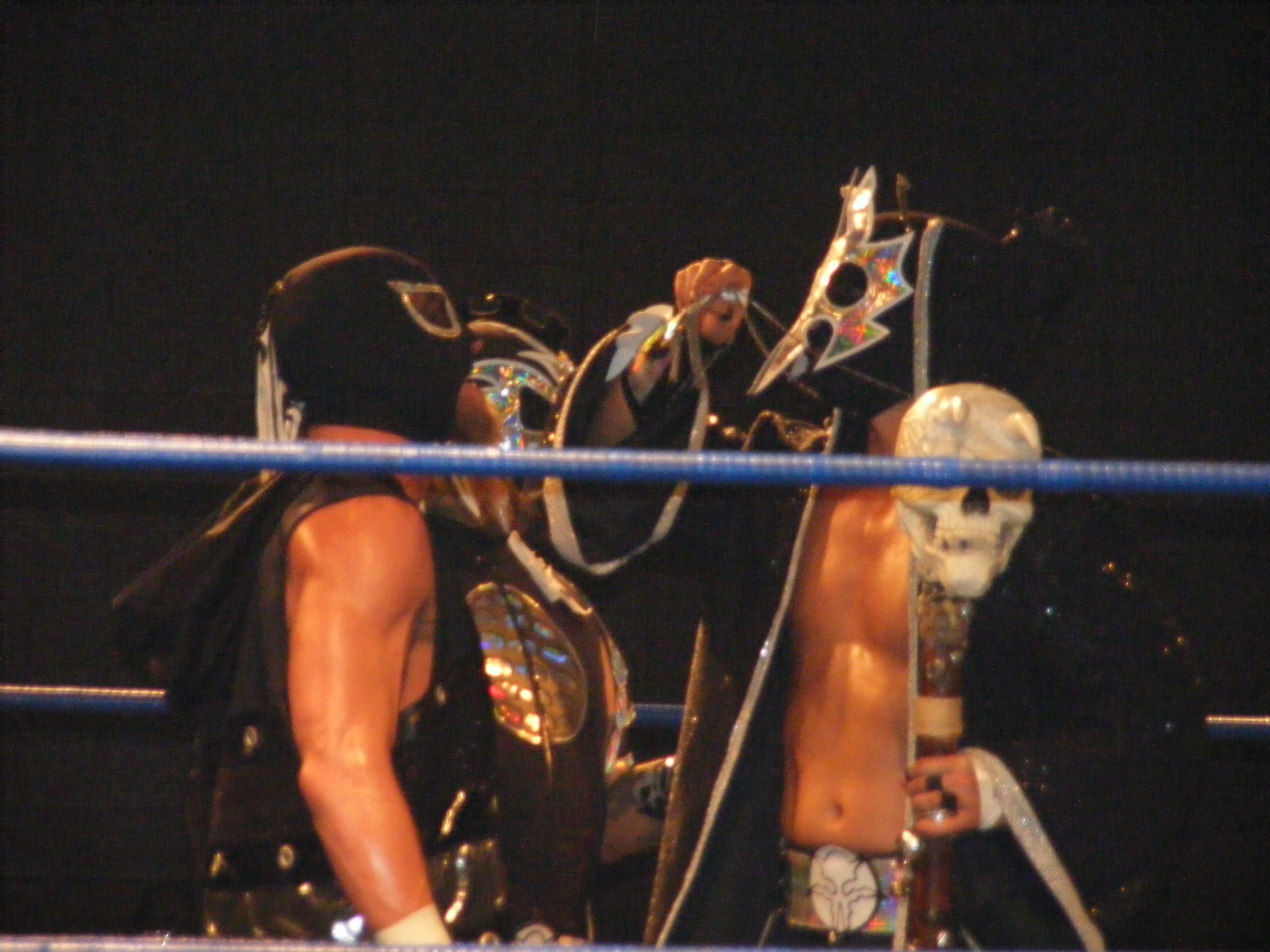
Delirious and UltraMantis Black, whose five-year storyline with each other culminated at Tomorrow Never Dies

On November 28, Chikara announced the seventh match for Tomorrow Never Dies, where Delirious would face UltraMantis Black in a Loser Leaves Chikara match. The storyline started back in April 2009, when the then rudo UltraMantis Black used the supposedly magical Eye of Tyr to brainwash Delirious into joining his Order of the Neo-Solar Temple stable. The following November, the BDK stable made its debut, took possession of the Eye of Tyr from UltraMantis and gained control over Delirious in the process. Delirious remained with BDK until Chikara's first iPPV, High Noon, in November 2011, where the now tecnico UltraMantis regained the Eye of Tyr and subsequently released Delirious from its spell. Delirious eventually returned to Chikara in early 2012, when he started a rivalry with UltraMantis, stating that he was going to make UltraMantis suffer for two years, just like he himself had suffered under the Eye of Tyr. Delirious and UltraMantis feuded for the rest of 2012 until Under the Hood, where UltraMantis was victorious over his rival in a ten-man tag team match, seemingly ending the rivalry. Delirious finally returned to Chikara in May 2014 at You Only Live Twice, where he attacked UltraMantis Black. With the rivalry reignited, Delirious, now once again affiliated with BDK under the Flood umbrella, kept attacking UltraMantis during the following months, including costing his team their opening match in the 2014 King of Trios.

== Event ==
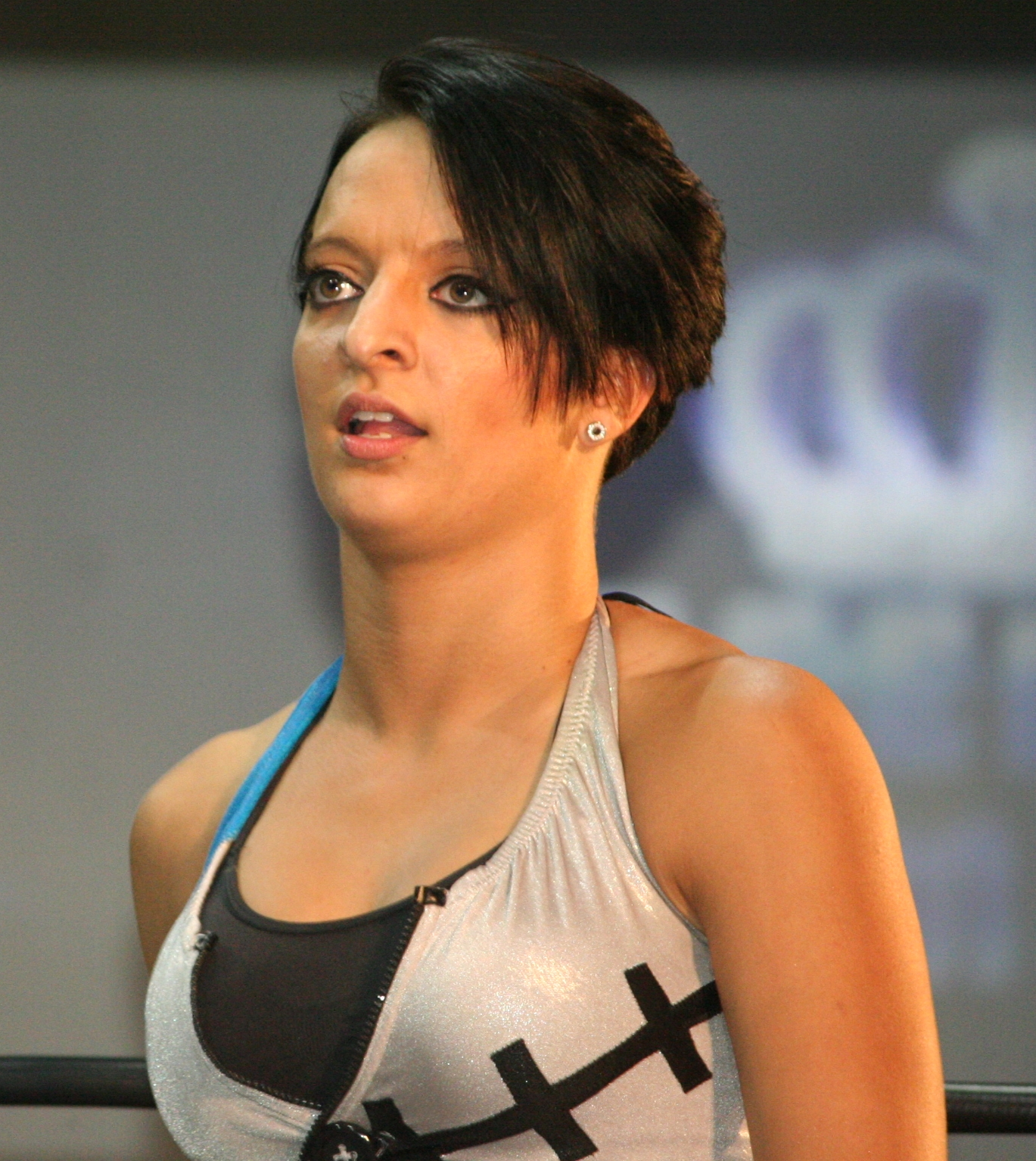
Heidi Lovelace, who captured the Chikara Young Lions Cup during the pre-show

=== Pre-show ===
The pre-show of Tomorrow Never Dies featured the finals of the Young Lions Cup XI tournament, where Heidi Lovelace defeated The Colony: Xtreme Force and Flood representative Missile Assault Ant to become the first female Young Lions Cup Champion.

=== Preliminary matches ===
The first match on the iPPV itself was a "German suplex match" between rivals Ashley Remington and Juan Francisco de Coronado. After surviving several German suplexes, Remington hit a deadlift German suplex to win the match.

The second match saw Eddie Kingston face Jimmy Jacobs, who was wearing Chikara trainee Kid Cyclone's cape and was accompanied to the ring by Flood stablemate Volgar and his "pet" Lithuanian Snow Troll. After hitting a Backfist to the Future once on Volgar and twice on Jacobs, Kingston pinned his rival to win the match. With the win, Kingston earned his third point and the right to challenge for the Chikara Grand Championship. Post-match, Kid Cyclone entered the ring and attacked Kingston with a wrench, saying that he could not forgive Kingston for feeding his training partners Create-a-Wrestler II and Equinox III to Deucalion, while also resenting Icarus and the rest of Chikara for not saving them. He then stated that he never wanted a mask or cape, before removing his mask and introducing himself as Kevin Condron. To end the segment, Condron freed the Lithuanian Snow Troll from his chains, handed him the wrench and walked backstage with him.

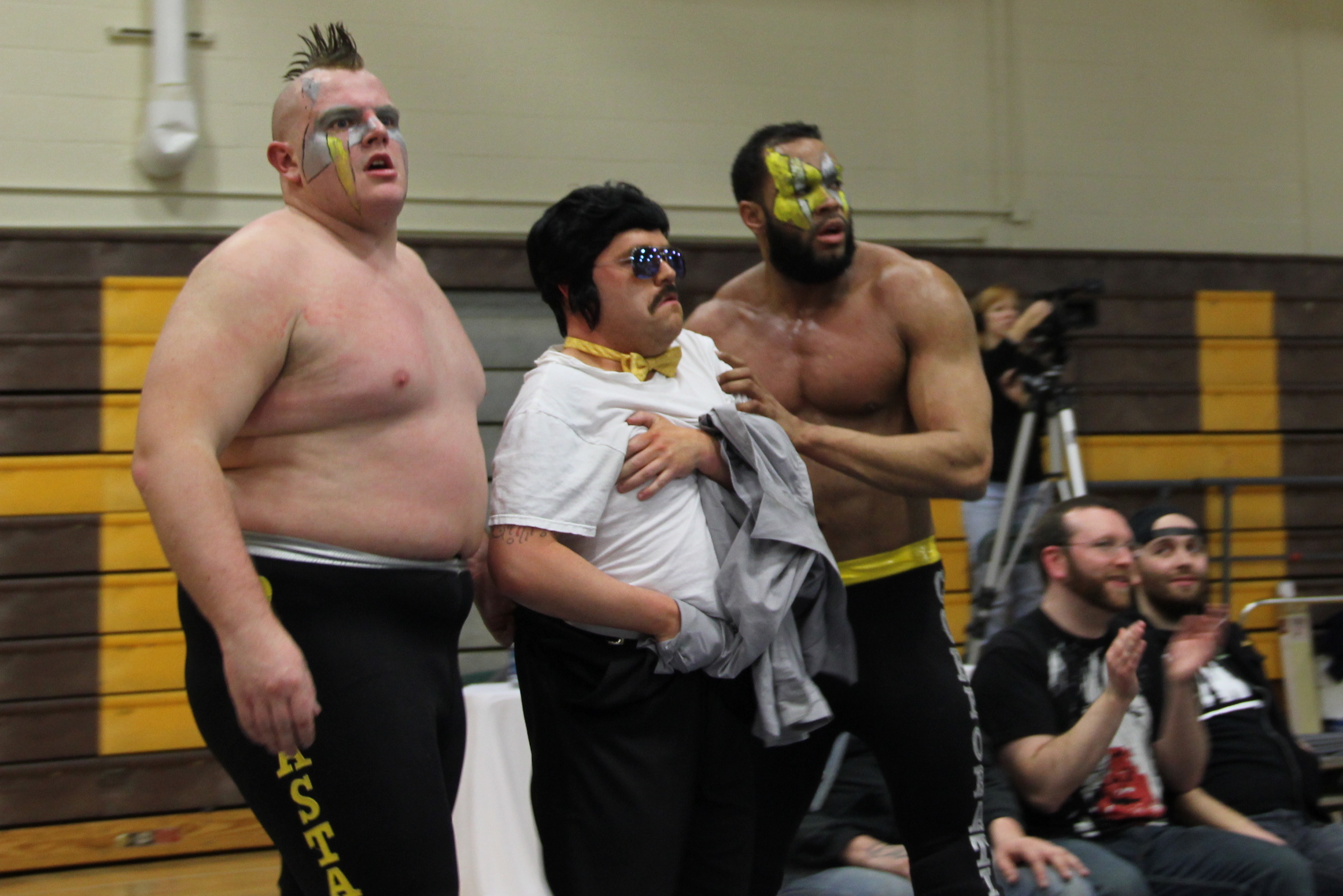
The Devastation Corporation (Blaster McMassive and Max Smashmaster), pictured with their manager Sidney Bakabella, won the Chikara Campeonatos de Parejas at Tomorrow Never Dies.

Next up, the Throwbacks defended their Campeonatos de Parejas against the Devastation Corporation. As with all tag team title matches in Chikara, the match was contested under two out of three falls rules. The challengers won the first fall and the champions the second fall. In the third fall, the Throwbacks had the match won with their finishing maneuver, the Prime Time, but Devastation Corporation's manager Sidney Bakabella interfered, helping his team win the fall and become the new Campeones de Parejas, ending the Throwbacks' reign in their second defense.

The fourth match on the iPPV saw UltraMantis Black face Delirious in a match, where the loser would have to leave Chikara. During the match, Delirious hit UltraMantis with his own finishing maneuver, the Praying Mantis Bomb, on three occasions, but UltraMantis survived each one and eventually hit the move himself to win the match and end the rivalry. However, before leaving Chikara, Delirious pulled out the Eye of Tyr, which the Flood had managed to put back together after its supposed destruction, and used its powers to turn UltraMantis' Spectral Envoy stablemates Hallowicked and Frightmare against him.

=== Main event matches ===
The fifth match at Tomorrow Never Dies was the torneo cibernetico between the Chikara and Flood squads. The main storyline of the match was Fire Ant, Silver Ant and Worker Ant coming face to face with Soldier Ant. Throughout the match, the three Chikara representatives were reluctant to engage Soldier Ant, instead trying to reason with him. Soldier Ant dominated the match, scoring eliminations over Jervis Cottonbelly, Worker Ant, Obariyon and Ophidian. In the end, the match came down to former Campeones de Parejas Fire Ant and Soldier Ant with Soldier Ant emerging victorious following a chokeslam, after turning down one final plea to "wake up".

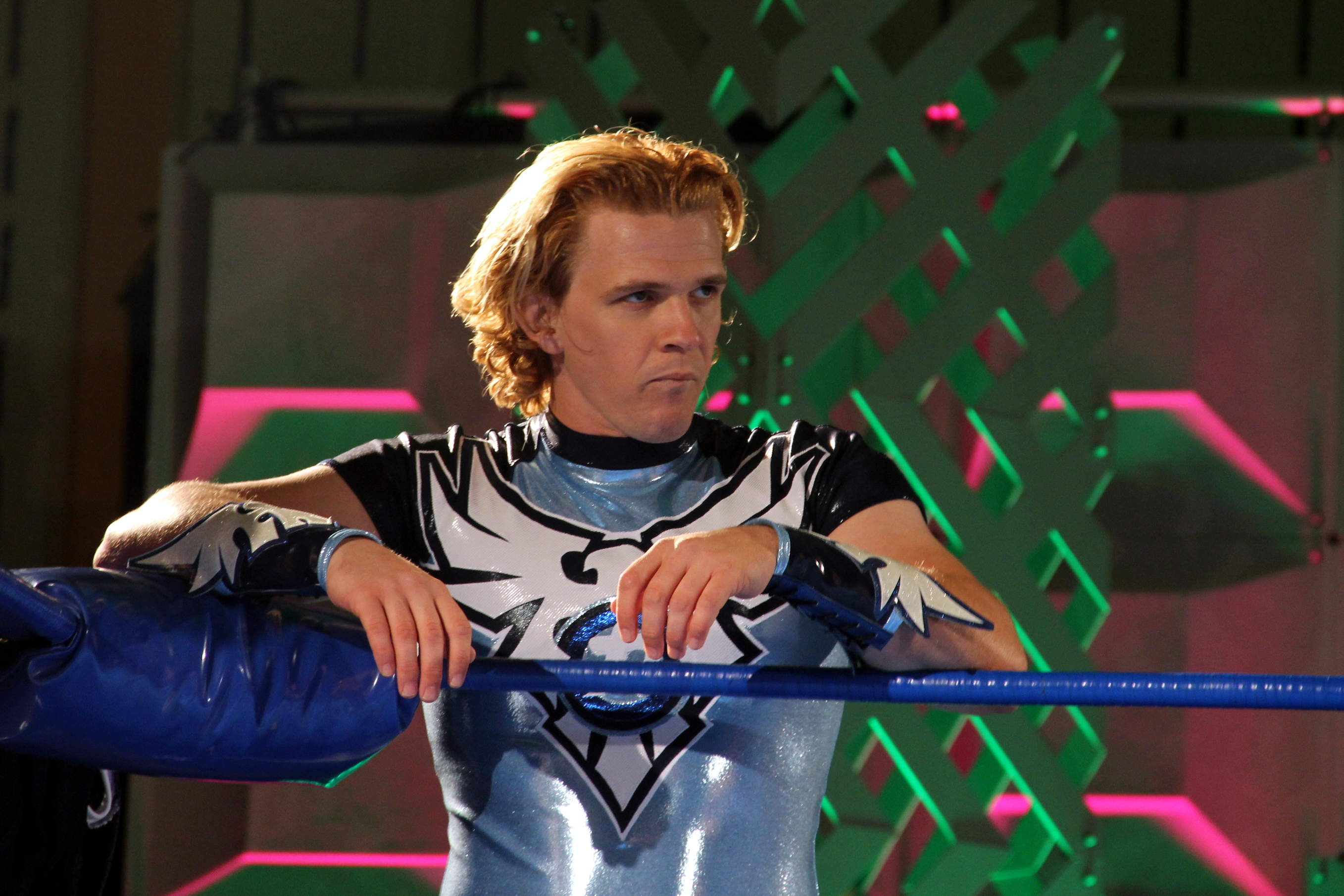
Icarus, who was victorious in the main event of Tomorrow Never Dies

While the steel cage was being set up around the ring, Chuck Taylor entered the arena to announce he was cashing in his three points and challenging his former partner Icarus for the Chikara Grand Championship at the Season 15 premiere on January 25, 2015.

The main event of Tomorrow Never Dies was the second steel cage match in Chikara history between Icarus and Deucalion. Deucalion entered the arena carrying masks of Chikara wrestlers he had "killed", while Icarus carried Estonian ThunderFrog's hammer, which in storyline holds powers similar to Mjölnir and could only be carried by those deemed worthy. During the match, the Chikara locker room emptied with wrestlers coming out to surround the cage. In the end, Icarus won the match after countering Deucalion's finishing maneuver, the chokebreaker, into the Chikara Special submission hold. After the match, Deucalion called for the Flood to enter the cage, but they were held back by Jimmy Jacobs who told him "you made your bed, now die in it". Icarus then grabbed Estonian ThunderFrog's hammer and hit Deucalion with it, seemingly "killing" him to end Chikara's Season 14.

== Results ==
No.	Results	Stipulations
1^{P}	Heidi Lovelace defeated Missile Assault Ant (with Arctic Rescue Ant and Orbit Adventure Ant)	Singles match for the Chikara Young Lions Cup
2	Ashley Remington defeated Juan Francisco de Coronado	German suplex match
3	Eddie Kingston defeated Jimmy Jacobs (with Lithuanian Snow Troll and Volgar)	Singles match
4	The Devastation Corporation (Blaster McMassive and Max Smashmaster) (with Sidney Bakabella) defeated The Throwbacks (Dasher Hatfield and Mark Angelosetti) (c)	Two out of three falls tag team match for the Chikara Campeonatos de Parejas
5	UltraMantis Black defeated Delirious	Loser Leaves Chikara match
6	The Flood Squad (Flex Rumblecrunch, Jakob Hammermeier, Jaka, Nøkken, Oleg the Usurper, Sir Oliver Grimsly, Soldier Ant and Volgar) (with Sidney Bakabella) defeated The Chikara Squad (Amasis, Fire Ant, Jervis Cottonbelly, Kodama, Obariyon, Ophidian, Silver Ant and Worker Ant): Soldier Ant won by last eliminating Fire Ant	Torneo cibernetico
7	Icarus defeated Deucalion	Steel cage match
(c) / – the champion(s) heading into the match; P / – the match was broadcast on the pre-show
