= Chikara You Only Live Twice =

2014 Chikara internet pau-per-view

You Only Live Twice
- Promotional poster featuring a phoenix rising from the "ashes of Chikara"
- Promotion: Chikara
- Date: May 25, 2014
- City: Easton, Pennsylvania
- Venue: The Palmer Center
- Attendance: 1,497

Pay-per-view chronology
← Previous; Aniversario: Never Compromise	Next → Tomorrow Never Dies

You Only Live Twice was a professional wrestling internet pay-per-view (iPPV) event produced by the Chikara promotion, that took place on May 25, 2014, at the Palmer Center in Easton, Pennsylvania. The event marked Chikara's fifth iPPV and first event since Aniversario: Never Compromise in June 2013.

== Background ==
You Only Live Twice featured eight professional wrestling matches involving different wrestlers from pre-existing scripted feuds, plots, and storylines that will be played out on Chikara's monthly house shows and on blog entries written on the promotion's official website. Wrestlers will portray villains (rudos in Chikara) or heroes (tecnicos in Chikara) as they follow a series of events that build tension, and culminate in a wrestling match or series of matches. Chikara follows lucha libre traditions and is known for its colorful characters and gimmicks and family-friendly content.

Following June 2, 2013, and the Aniversario: Never Compromise internet pay-per-view (iPPV), Chikara went inactive for a full year, following a storyline development, where the Titor Conglomerate, the storyline owners of the promotion, shut it down in order to cover their tracks regarding their dark past involving a paramilitary group named Condor Security. The Titor Conglomerate then supposedly put the Chikara brand, its related intellectual properties and remaining physical assets on sale, reducing the promotion to ashes. During the rest of the year, a group of Chikara wrestlers, led by Icarus, began holding fan gatherings and "guerrilla events", trying to revive the promotion. This led to the Flood, a group of rudos from Chikara's past, coming together and starting to shut down Chikara's several smaller sister promotions in order to destroy its final remnants. The storyline culminated on February 1, 2014, during the National Pro Wrestling Day, when the two groups collided. After the Chikara wrestlers had prevailed, Icarus announced that Chikara was coming back on May 25, ending the promotion's one-year-long hiatus. In storyline, the return was made possible by former Chikara wrestler Robbie Ellis winning an auction and becoming the promotion's new owner. The name of the return event was later revealed as "You Only Live Twice", making it one of several Chikara shows to be held in 2014 named after James Bond films. Tickets for the event were sold out within days with no roster or matches announced. On April 1, Chikara announced that You Only Live Twice would be broadcast live on iPPV through Smart Mark Video. As part of Chikara's return weekend, the promotion presented "LuchaBowl", a fundraiser for a local chapter of the Make-A-Wish Foundation, on May 24 and "Expansion Pack", an interactive fan fest, before the iPPV on May 25. Also on May 24, Chikara's sister promotion Wrestling is Fun! (WiF!) presented the finals of the 2014 Tag World Grand Prix, a tournament held by Chikara from 2003 to 2013.

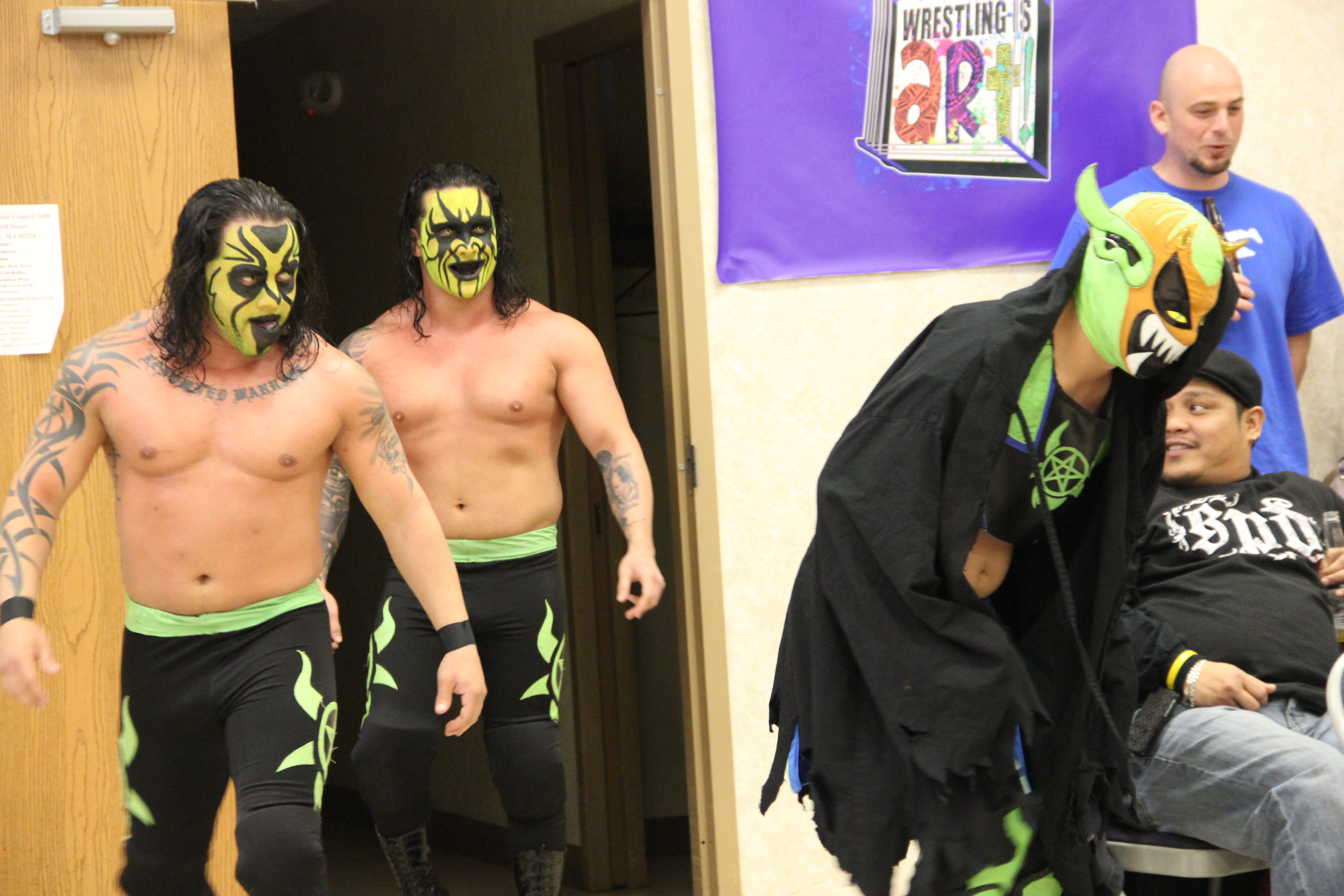
(Left to right) Kodama, Obariyon and Kobald of The Batiri

On May 5, Chikara announced the first match for the iPPV, which would see The Batiri of Kobald, Kodama and Obariyon take on Sinn Bodhi and the Odditorium of Oliver Grimsly and Qefka the Quiet in a six-man tag team match. The match is part of the big return storyline with The Batiri, longtime rudos turning tecnicos to represent Chikara, while Sinn Bodhi returned as part of the Flood. As part of the storyline, Bodhi successfully took over Wrestling is Art in November 2013 and promptly shut it down. The Batiri have a long history with Bodhi with them being introduced to Chikara in late 2010 as Bodhi's minions. In storyline, UltraMantis Black hired Bodhi to train him three minions, but when the time came, he could not produce payment, which led to Bodhi turning on him and taking control of The Batiri himself. Bodhi and The Batiri remained together as the Dark Army until Bodhi left Chikara at the end of 2011, after finally getting his payment. You Only Live Twice marks the Odditorium's debut in Chikara.

On May 8, Chikara announced the first title match for the iPPV, where Eddie Kingston would defend the Chikara Grand Championship against Icarus in a match "one year in the making". On June 2, 2013, Kingston and Icarus faced off in the main event of Aniversario: Never Compromise. In the weeks leading to the event, Icarus, once known as one of the most hated wrestlers in Chikara, turned tecnico and, following the implosion of his F.I.S.T. stable, began chasing the promotion's top title, held by Kingston, who in turn had begun showing signs of a rudo turn. At the iPPV, Icarus had the match won, when Condor Security interrupted the match and shut down the event, leading to the one-year long hiatus. During the hiatus, Icarus was the leader of the group of wrestlers trying to bring Chikara back, while Kingston was one of the few Chikara wrestlers not to align with the group. During the National Pro Wrestling Day, when he was met with chants of "Chikara", Kingston even proclaimed that the promotion was dead. Kingston and Icarus are both Chikara originals, with Icarus graduating from the promotion's first group of trainees and Kingston from the second in 2002.

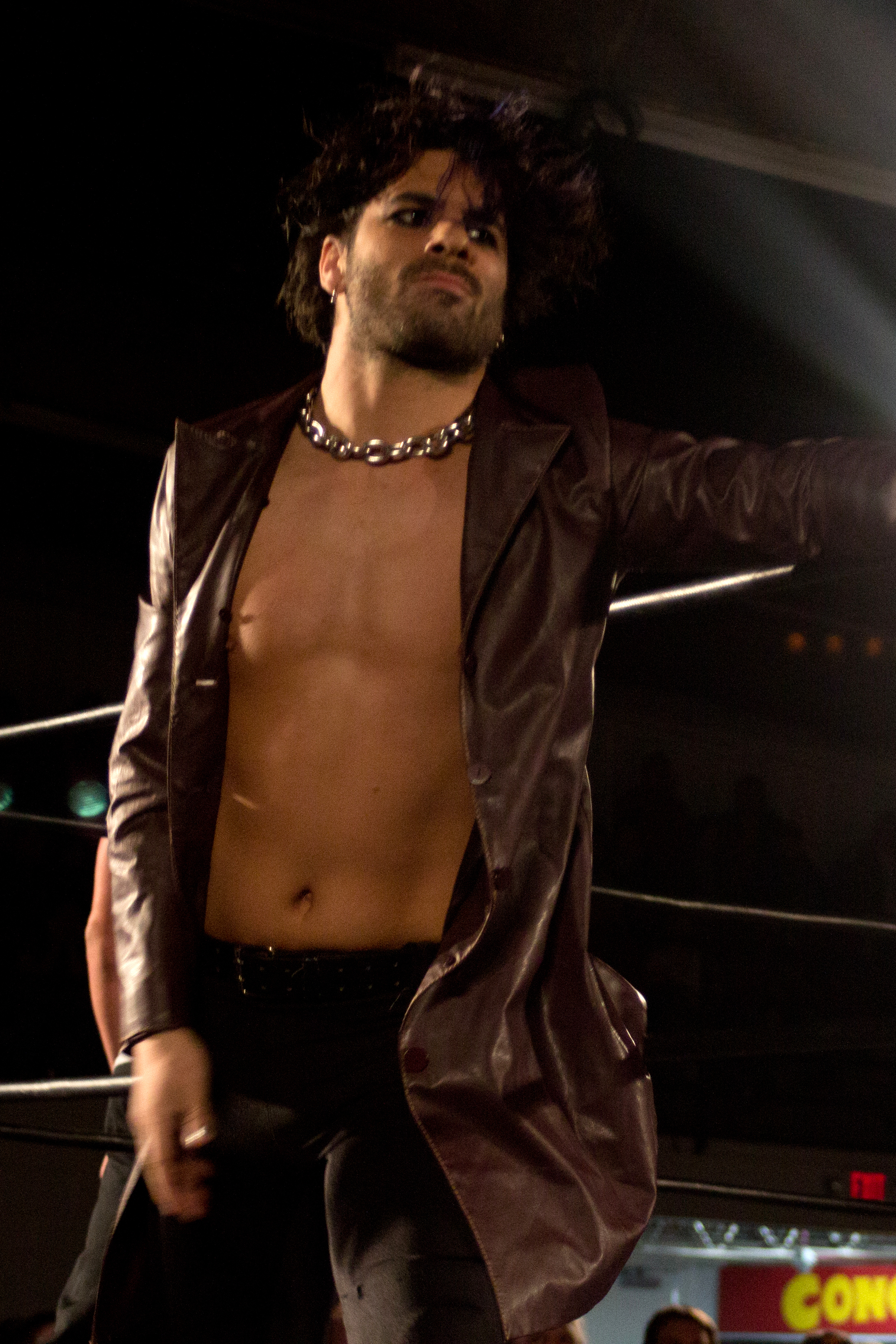
Jimmy Jacobs

During Chikara's one-year hiatus, the promotion chronicled various storylines in a YouTube series titled Ashes. One of these storylines involved the tag team 3.0 (Scott Parker and Shane Matthews) going on a road trip to find Archibald Peck, who, after taking a Backfist to the Future from Eddie Kingston in May 2013, had supposedly been sent back in time to June 2012 to close a time paradox his earlier time traveling had caused. During the National Pro Wrestling Day, Jimmy Jacobs, who had made some appearances for Chikara in the past, but was not a regular member of the promotion's roster, revealed himself as the leader of the Flood. The Chikara side eventually prevailed in the brawl between the two groups, but only after 3.0 brought Peck to the scene in a DeLorean. On May 12, Chikara announced a singles match between Peck and Jacobs for You Only Live Twice.

One stable from Chikara's past included in the Flood was Bruderschaft des Kreuzes (BDK), who had dominated Chikara after forming in November 2009, winning all of its major accomplishments. In storyline, BDK's formation was a direct result of rudo UltraMantis Black trying to use "black arts" to elevate his Order of the Neo-Solar Temple to new heights. After originally trying to avoid BDK, UltraMantis was finally pulled into a feud with the stable in early 2010, after BDK dissolved the Order of the Neo-Solar Temple. After Sinn Bodhi also took The Batiri away from UltraMantis, he finally found himself new allies in longtime tecnicos Frightmare and Hallowicked, with the three coming together to form the Spectral Envoy stable. In exchange for the help, UltraMantis vowed to right his past wrongs, which included both the Dark Army and BDK. The Spectral Envoy's feud with BDK lasted until Chikara's first iPPV, High Noon in November 2011, where BDK was defeated and effectively dissolved. Two years later, BDK returned to destroy Chikara's sister promotions and successfully shut down Wrestling is Cool in December 2013, when the promotion's owner Milo Schnitzler revealed himself a BDK sleeper agent and showed his allegiance to the stable's leader Ares by ending the company. On May 14, Chikara announced that at You Only Live Twice, the Spectral Envoy would take on BDK, represented by Ares and the debuting duo of Schnitzler and Nøkken.

Also announced for the event is a singles match between Jervis Cottonbelly and the debuting Juan Francisco de Coronado, better known from WiF!, and a four-way elimination tag team match between 3.0 (Scott Parker and Shane Matthews), Gekido (17 and deviAnt), Pieces of Hate (Jigsaw and The Shard) and the Throwbacks (Dasher Hatfield and Mark Angelosetti). In Chikara, teams need three points, or three back-to-back wins, in order to be eligible to challenge for the promotion's tag team championship, the Campeonatos de Parejas. A team could earn all three points in this match by scoring all three eliminations. Pieces of Hate were the reigning Campeones de Parejas, while the other three teams in the match stood at zero points. 3.0 lost the title to Pieces of Hate at Chikara's previous event, Aniversario: Never Compromise, while 17 and deviAnt, though Gekido stablemates, had not wrestled a regular tag team match together prior to You Only Live Twice. The Throwbacks, who earned a spot in the match by winning WiF!'s 2014 Tag World Grand Prix the day before You Only Live Twice, had previously challenged for the Campeonatos de Parejas on July 29, 2012, but heading into the iPPV stood at zero points after losing another four-way elimination match on April 6, 2013. Gekido and Pieces of Hate were both also affiliated with the Flood.

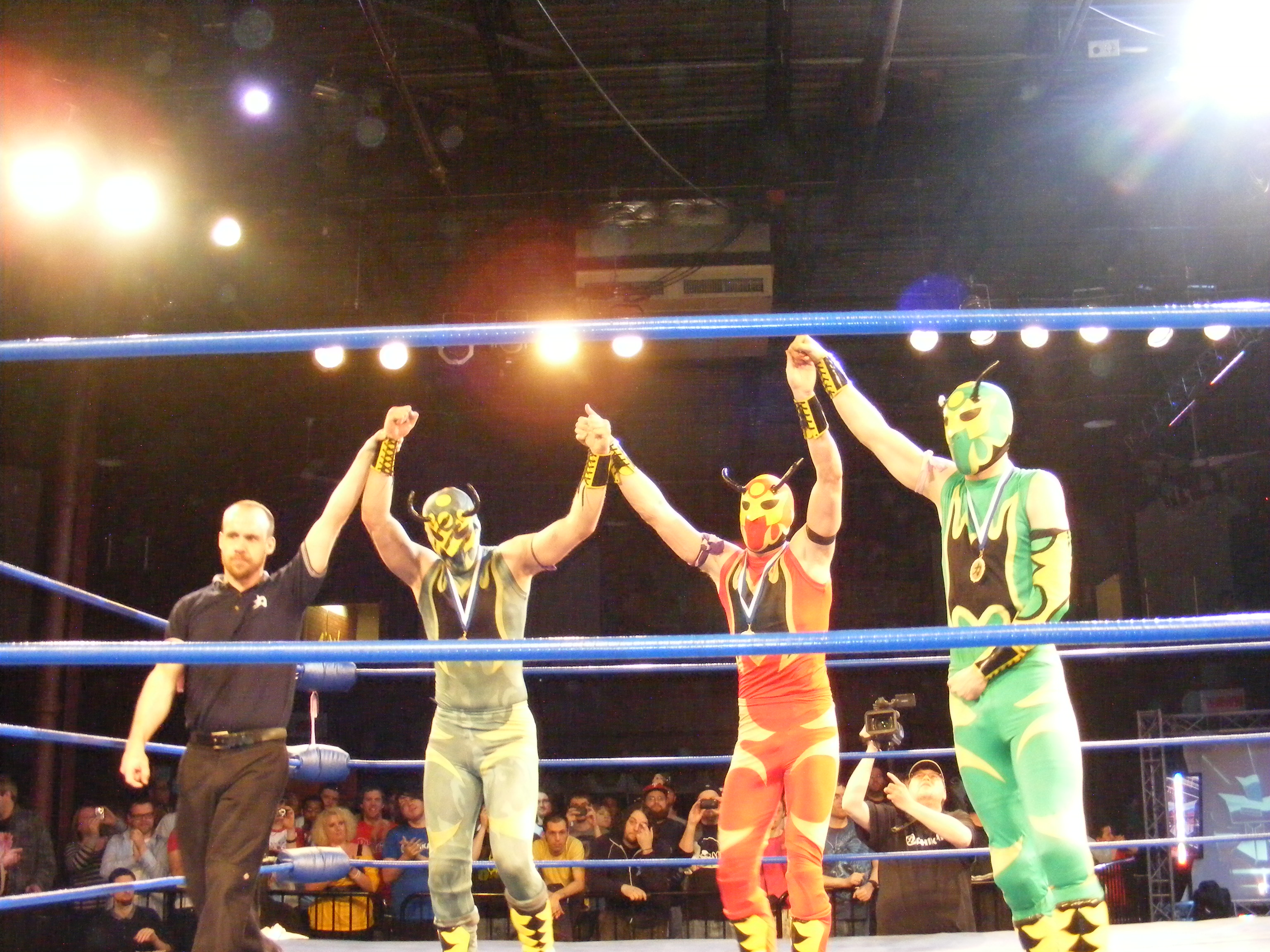
The Colony celebrating their 2011 King of Trios win, which was retroactively taken away from them as part of a storyline with The Colony: Xtreme Force

On May 19, Chikara announced the seventh and final match for the event, where The Colony (assailAnt, Fire Ant and Green Ant) faces The Colony: Xtreme Force (Arctic Rescue Ant, Missile Assault Ant and Orbit Adventure Ant). The storyline behind the match started in July 2012, when then-Director of Fun Wink Vavasseur broke up one of Chikara's most popular acts, The Colony of Fire Ant, Green Ant and Soldier Ant, by moving Soldier Ant to The Swarm, a sub-group within Gekido, while replacing him in The Colony with Swarm member assailAnt. At the end of the year, assailAnt changed his rudo ways and was accepted as a member of The Colony, while Soldier Ant refused to change his ways and was left outside of Gekido and The Swarm, now without any partners. Vavasseur promised Soldier Ant a new team to lead and in March 2013 introduced The Colony: Xtreme Force of Arctic Rescue Ant, Missile Assault Ant and Orbit Adventure Ant. The move was portrayed as simply a marketing ploy by Vavasseur, who even stripped the original Colony of their 2011 King of Trios win and awarded it to his new trio. After only a month of teaming with his new rudo partners, Soldier Ant handed in his resignation to Vavasseur and left Chikara. Afterwards, Gekido and Swarm member deviAnt took over as Xtreme Force's new leader. During the one-year hiatus, The Colony and Xtreme Force were on opposing sides, with The Colony fighting for Chikara and Xtreme Force for the Flood.

== Results ==
No.	Results	Stipulations	Times
1	Bruderschaft des Kreuzes (Ares, Nøkken and Tursas) (with Milo Schnitzler) defeated The Spectral Envoy (Frightmare, Hallowicked and UltraMantis Black)	Six-man tag team match	07:21
2	Ashley Remington defeated Chuck Taylor	Singles match	07:42
3	The Batiri (Kobald, Kodama and Obariyon) defeated Oliver Grimsly, Qefka the Quiet and Sinn Bodhi via disqualification	Six-man tag team match	09:43
4	Juan Francisco de Coronado defeated Jervis Cottonbelly	Singles match	05:09
5	The Throwbacks (Dasher Hatfield and Mark Angelosetti) defeated 3.0 (Scott Parker and Shane Matthews), Gekido (17 and deviAnt) and Pieces of Hate (Jigsaw and The Shard)	Four-way elimination tag team match	19:38
6	Jimmy Jacobs defeated Archibald Peck	Singles match	07:15
7	The Colony: Xtreme Force (Arctic Rescue Ant, Missile Assault Ant and Orbit Adventure Ant) (with deviAnt) defeated The Colony (Fire Ant, Green Ant and Worker Ant)	Six-man tag team match	14:38
8	Icarus defeated Eddie Kingston (c)	Singles match for the Chikara Grand Championship	16:39
(c) / – the champion(s) heading into the match
