= Yolo =

Yolo or YOLO may refer to:

== Arts and entertainment ==
=== Film and television ===
- YOLO (film), 2024 Chinese comedy drama film
- YOLO (2016 TV series), 2016 Ghanaian TV series
- YOLO (2020 TV series), 2020 animated series for Adult Swim
- "YOLO" (The Simpsons), 2013 episode
- "YOLO" (Scandal), 2013 episode of the TV series Scandal

=== Music ===
- "YOLO" (The Lonely Island song), 2013
- "YOLO" (Band-Maid song), 2016
- "Yolo" (Gims song), 2020
- YOLO (album), 2017 album by South Korean pop music group Dia
- "YOLO", a song by Madtown from their 2014 EP Mad Town

== Places ==
- Yolo, Mali, a village

=== United States ===
- Yolo, California, an unincorporated community and census-designated place
- Yolo County, California
  - Yolo County Airport
- Woodland, California, former name Yolo City

== Science and technology ==
- Yolo telescope, a type of reflecting telescope with tilted mirrors
- You Only Look Once, a series of neural networks for object detection and recognition

== People ==
- Yolo (prince) (1625–1689), Manchu prince of the Qing dynasty
- Yolo Akili (born 1981), activist, writer, poet, counselor, and community organizer

== Other uses ==
- "YOLO" (aphorism) ("you only live once")

== See also ==
- Yolo Bypass, a flood bypass in the Sacramento Valley, US
  - Yolo Bypass Wildlife Area, located within the Yolo Bypass
- Jolo (disambiguation)
- You Only Live Once (disambiguation)
- Yolo City (disambiguation)
- Yulo
