= Cottonbelly =

Cottonbelly may refer to:

- Jervis Cottonbelly, professional wrestling gimmick that made its debut in 2005
- Stuart Matthewman (born 1960), English musician also known as Cottonbelly
