= Aniversario: Never Compromise =

2013 Chikara internet pay-per-view event

- Promotional poster for the event
- Promotion: Chikara
- Date: June 2, 2013
- City: Philadelphia, Pennsylvania
- Venue: Trocadero Theatre
- Attendance: 600

Pay-per-view chronology
← Previous; Under the Hood	Next → You Only Live Twice

Aniversario: Never Compromise was a professional wrestling internet pay-per-view (iPPV) event produced by the Chikara promotion, that took place on June 2, 2013, at the Trocadero Theatre in Philadelphia, Pennsylvania. The event marked Chikara's fourth iPPV, third to take place at the Trocadero Theatre and the promotion's only event to take place in Philadelphia in 2013. Much like the previous iPPV, Under the Hood, Aniversario: Never Compromise also aired through Smart Mark Video. Aniversario: Never Compromise celebrated Chikara's eleventh anniversary and was the first anniversary event to take place on iPPV; in the past, the promotion had celebrated its anniversaries with weekends of two shows. The event saw all three Chikara championships being defended with one title change, where Pieces of Hate (Jigsaw and The Shard) defeated 3.0 (Scott Parker and Shane Matthews) for the Campeonatos de Parejas. Another major match during the event saw former Campeones de Parejas, Amasis and Ophidian, end their nineteen-month storyline rivalry in a Sarcophagus match. The event concluded with a major storyline development, where Chikara's authority figure Wink Vavasseur ended the event and shut down the promotion, while the main event was still going on in the ring, leading to the promotion going inactive for a full year.

== Background ==
Aniversario: Never Compromise and its pre-show featured eight professional wrestling matches involving different wrestlers from pre-existing scripted feuds, plots, and storylines that played out on Chikara's monthly house shows and on blog entries written on the promotion's official website. Wrestlers portray villains (rudos in Chikara) or heroes (tecnicos in Chikara) as they follow a series of events that build tension, and culminate in a wrestling match or series of matches. Chikara follows lucha libre traditions and is known for its colorful characters and gimmicks and family-friendly content.

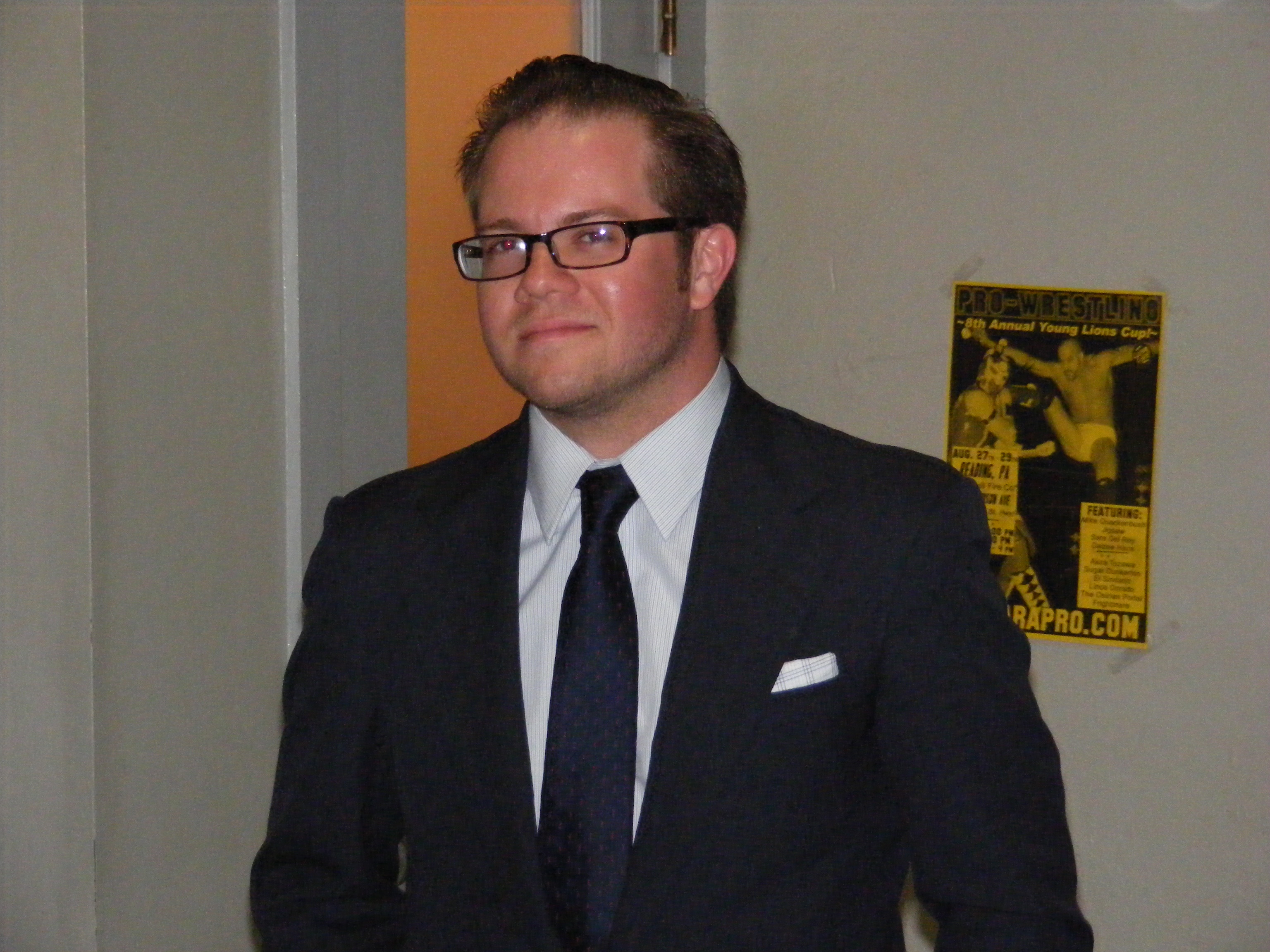
Director of Fun Wink Vavasseur, whose struggle to remain in control of Chikara provided the main storyline for Aniversario: Never Compromise

The main storyline heading into Aniversario: Never Compromise involved Chikara's Director of Fun Wink Vavasseur's struggle to remain in control of a promotion, which had begun to unravel around him. In storyline, Chikara was on January 3, 2011, bought by Worldwide Media Development (WMD) Corporation, who installed Vavasseur as the promotion's Director of Fun or main authority figure. WMD itself was owned by The Titor Conglomerate, an investment company, where Vavasseur's father, W. Conrad Vavasseur, who made his Chikara debut at the end of Under the Hood telling his son to "stop screwing up", worked as the Executive Vice President of Acquisitions. The group was named after John Titor, a supposed time traveler. Time travel was also part of the Chikara universe with Archibald Peck claiming that he had been sent both backwards and forwards in time as a result of his matches. The Titor Conglomerate also supposedly owned other groups, including the Condor Security, a paramilitary force who worked as Vavasseur's personal security force at Chikara events. As part of the storyline, Chikara set up websites for both The Titor Conglomerate and a group opposing them, named "No Private Army" (NPA). NPA remained largely outside of Chikara, trying to expose The Titor Conglomerate's and Condor Security's dark secrets on its blog. However, a supposed member of the group made an appearance at Chikara's April 6, 2013, event, when he handed the promotion's founder Mike Quackenbush an envelope following his match. Shortly afterwards, Quackenbush was in storyline kicked out of his own promotion. As a Director of Fun, Wink Vavasseur was portrayed as incompetent, not knowing the basics of professional wrestling or even the names of Chikara wrestlers. He also introduced his own "Chikarabermetrics" system, where he assigned wrestlers points and then grouped them together by them. This led to him removing Soldier Ant from Chikara's top tecnico stable The Colony and inserting tecnico Sugar Dunkerton into rudo stable F.I.S.T. Vavasseur and his system were regularly criticized by Chikara employees, most notably The Colony member Green Ant, Sugar Dunkerton, and former referee Derek Sabato.

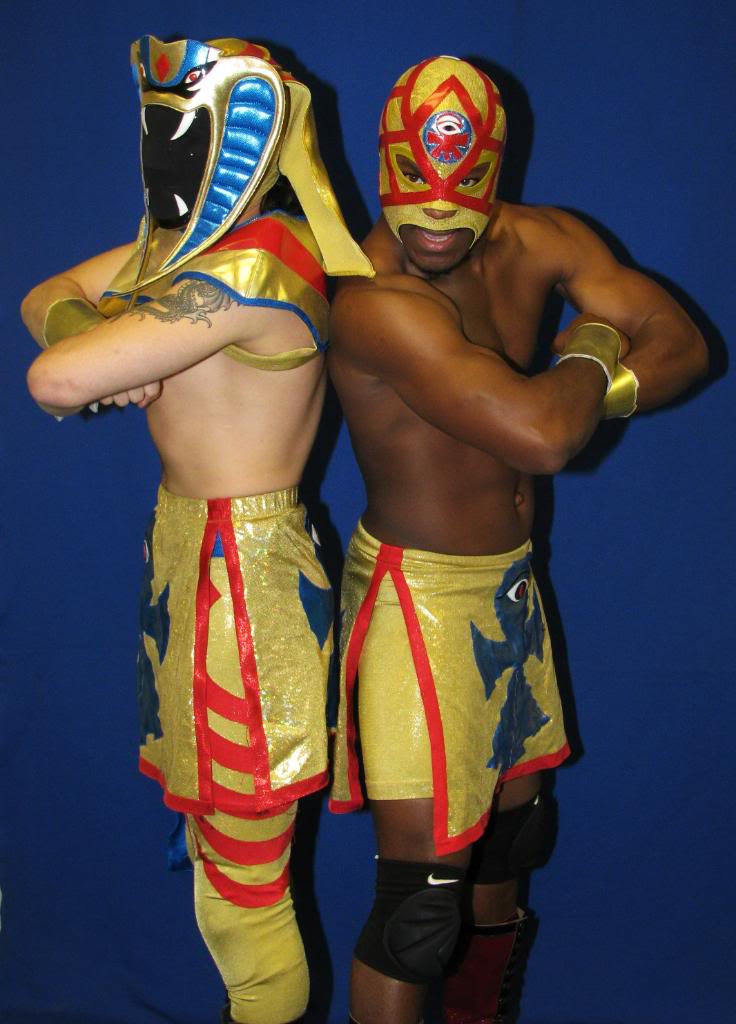
(Left to right) Ophidian and Amasis together in 2010

The first match announced for the pay-per-view saw former Osirian Portal tag team partners and Campeones de Parejas, Amasis and Ophidian, face each other in a grudge match. The rivalry dated back to Chikara's first internet pay-per-view, High Noon, on November 13, 2011, where Ophidian turned on his longtime partner, after he had announced his retirement from professional wrestling due to an out-of-the-ring accident. Amasis returned to Chikara on December 2, 2012, at Under the Hood, appearing in the crowd and distracting Ophidian during his match. Amasis kept confronting Ophidian at events in early 2013, which led to Chikara announcing the first match between the two former partners for April 6. The match was ruled a no contest, when Amasis was attacked by Ophidian's allies, Kobald, Kodama and Obariyon of The Batiri, before the opening bell. In a blog entry on Chikara's official website, Ophidian claimed that he was ready to face Amasis, but only after healing his previously injured leg. Amasis replied, giving his former partner the right to choose when and where the two would finally meet. On April 12, Chikara announced a rematch between the two for Aniversario: Never Compromise. On May 17, Chikara announced that the match would take place under "Sarcophagus match" rules.

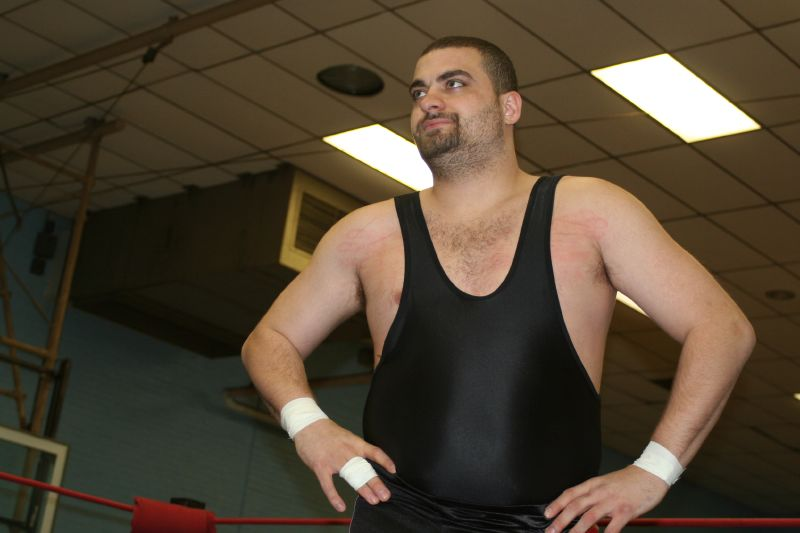
Eddie Kingston, who headed into Aniversario: Never Compromise as the defending Chikara Grand Champion

On April 26, Chikara announced the second match for Aniversario: Never Compromise, which would see Icarus challenge for the Chikara Grand Championship. On March 14, 2013, Chikara's Director of Fun Wink Vavasseur announced that instead of stripping Eddie Kingston of the Chikara Grand Championship for his failure to attend an event, where he was scheduled to defend the title against Green Ant, he was going to be forcing him to put the title on the line at every subsequent event held by Chikara. When the title match was announced, Kingston was scheduled to defend the title three more times, before the iPPV. During the weekend of May 3 and 4, Kingston got past the first two of these defenses, successfully defending the title first against Green Ant and then against Mark Angelosetti. On May 18, Kingston defeated Archibald Peck to ensure that he would enter Aniversario: Never Compromise as the defending Chikara Grand Champion. In the months prior to Aniversario: Never Compromise, Kingston's popularity among Chikara fans had started to decrease, while Icarus, for years referred to as one of the most hated wrestlers in Chikara, began showing signs of a tecnico turn, which eventually led to the implosion of his longtime F.I.S.T. stable with both Johnny Gargano and Sugar Dunkerton quitting the stable over his actions. With no more allies, Icarus reached out to his childhood idol Marty Jannetty, requesting that he would be by his side at Aniversario: Never Compromise. On May 30, Jannetty accepted Icarus' request, remembering how Icarus had shown him respect following an eight-man tag team match on April 6.

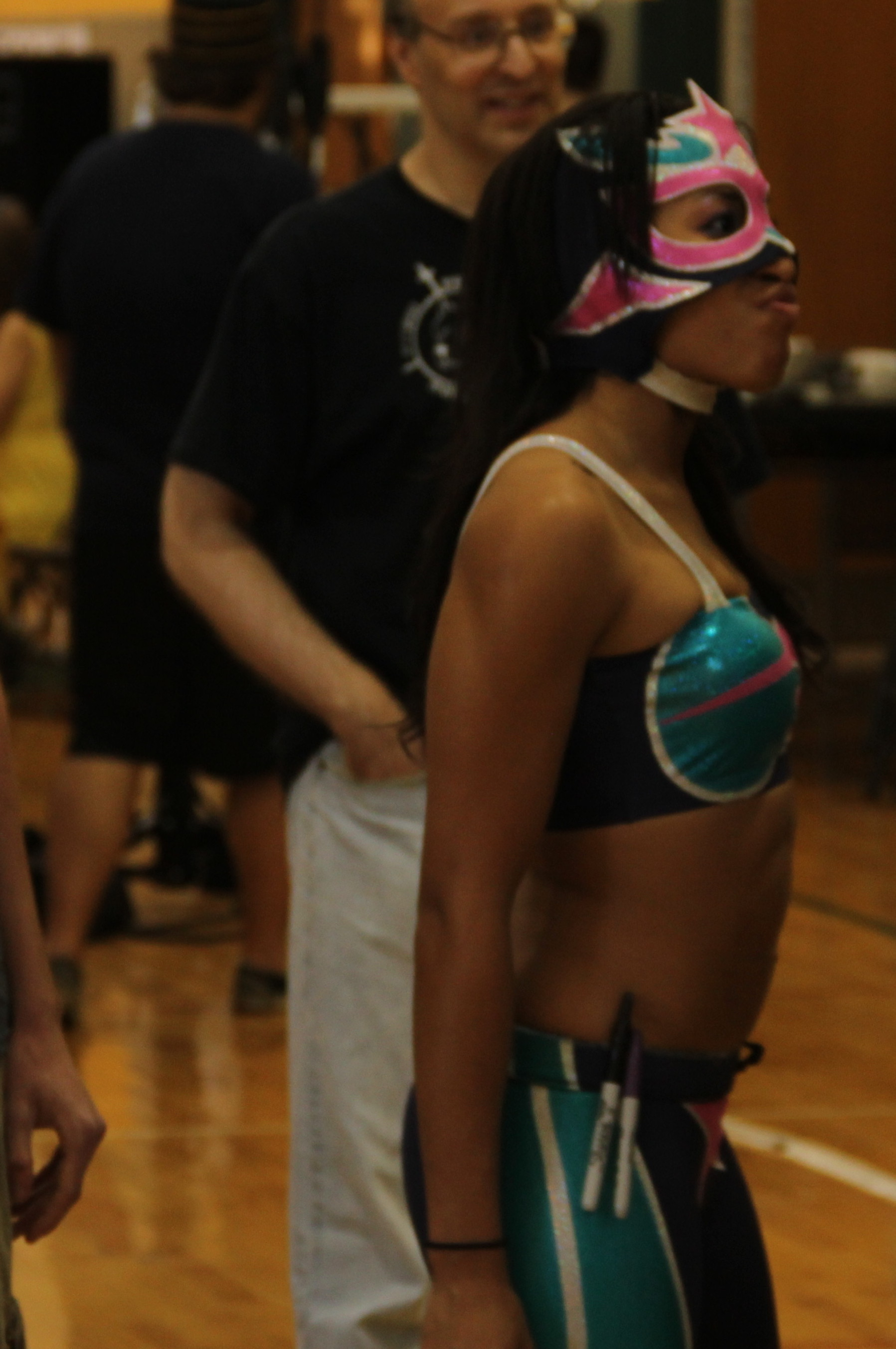
Saturyne, the number one contender to the Chikara Young Lions Cup heading into Aniversario: Never Compromise

On May 7, Chikara announced the third match for the Aniversario: Never Compromise, where Saturyne would challenge Mark Angelosetti for the Chikara Young Lions Cup. This marked the second time Chikara's only female wrestler would challenge for Angelosetti's title; the original title match between the two took place February 10, 2013, and saw Angelosetti retain the title. Smart Mark Video later announced that the match would take place on the "Freeview A-Go-Go" pre-show and not the pay-per-view itself.

The fourth match announced for the iPPV saw The Colony: Xtreme Force (Arctic Rescue Ant, Missile Assault Ant and Orbit Adventure Ant) take on The Spectral Envoy (Frightmare, Hallowicked and UltraMantis Black). After Under the Hood, where Soldier Ant was left outside both The Colony and Gekido, he was given the opportunity to be a leader, when Chikara's Director of Fun Wink Vavasseur presented him with three new partners; Arctic Rescue Ant, Missile Assault Ant and Orbit Adventure Ant of The Colony: Xtreme Force, who made their debuts on March 8, 2013. Vavasseur was ultimately so enamored by his new creation that he stripped Fire Ant, Green Ant and Soldier Ant of their 2011 King of Trios win and awarded it to The Colony: Xtreme Force. On April 6, The Colony: Xtreme Force defeated The Colony members assailAnt, Fire Ant and Green Ant and Spectral Envoy member Frightmare in an eight-man tag team match, when Missile Assault Ant unmasked Frightmare and then pinned him for the win as he was covering his face. Following the event, Soldier Ant, who had had problems getting along with his new rudo partners, handed in his resignation to Vavasseur and left Chikara, continuing a recent trend of Chikara wrestlers being unhappy with decisions made by the Director of Fun. Soldier Ant's resignation led to former Gekido member deviAnt taking over the leadership of The Colony: Xtreme Force. On April 17, UltraMantis Black, the leader of The Spectral Envoy, declared war on The Colony: Xtreme Force, claiming that "those who cross one of us, cross us all". On May 4, UltraMantis Black led Spectral Envoy partners Frightmare and Hallowicked along with Green Ant to face The Colony: Xtreme Force in an eight-man tag team match. The Colony: Xtreme Force ended up winning the match, when Missile Assault Ant unmasked himself and then handed the mask to UltraMantis Black, drawing a disqualification from the referee, who thought UltraMantis Black had unmasked his opponent. On May 10, Chikara announced a "Battle for Trios Supremacy" between The Colony: Xtreme Force, the supposed 2011 King of Trios, and The Spectral Envoy, the 2012 King of Trios, for Aniversario: Never Compromise. Before the pay-per-view, The Spectral Envoy and The Colony: Xtreme Force faced off in the first round of the 2013 Tag World Grand Prix on May 18, with Frightmare and Hallowicked taking on deviAnt and Orbit Adventure Ant. During the match, Frightmare was once again unmasked, but this time the referee caught the unmasking and disqualified The Colony: Xtreme Force.

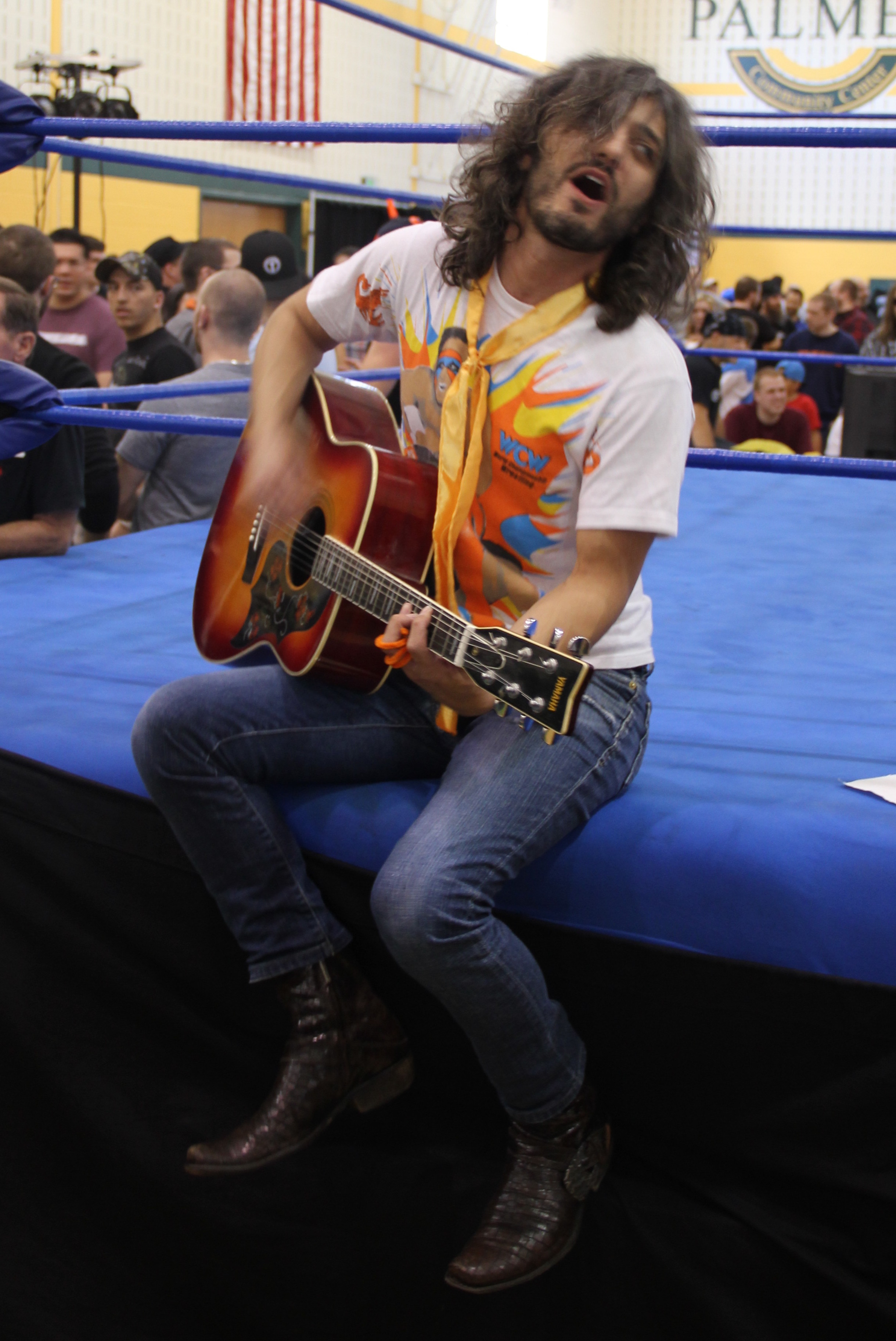
Chikara commentator and ring announcer Gavin Loudspeaker

On May 17, Chikara announced the fifth match for the event, which would see commentator and ring announcer Gavin Loudspeaker take on Tim Donst. Following Under the Hood, where he failed to capture the Chikara Grand Championship from Eddie Kingston, Donst continued a storyline mental collapse that had started in June 2012, when he lost his hair at Chikarasaurus Rex: How to Hatch a Dinosaur, ultimately revealing that his "grand plan" was still in effect and did not involve him winning the Grand Championship, but instead unhinging Kingston and turning him into the "destroyer of Chikara" so that he himself could "rise up as the martyr of pro-wrestling". In the start of 2013, Donst adopted Steve "The Turtle" Weiner and Veronica as his new followers, while also retaining Jakob Hammermeier as a follower. The rivalry between Donst and Loudspeaker began following Chikara's first shows of 2013, when Donst took exception to Loudspeaker's claim that he was "not main event material". Loudspeaker's outrage at Donst was fueled by his abusive treatment of his followers, especially Steve Weiner. Several verbal exchanges between the two eventually led to Donst attacking Loudspeaker first on April 6, after losing to Archibald Peck, and again on May 4, following a loss against Saturyne, both times cutting off a lock of his hair. Being a non-wrestler, Loudspeaker requested Chikara's Director of Fun Wink Vavasseur for an opportunity to manage one of his friends to take on Donst at Aniversario: Never Compromise. However, Vavasseur turned down the request, remembering how Loudspeaker had questioned his abilities and capabilities in the past, and instead booked a match between Loudspeaker and Donst for the event, calling it a "character-building exercise". In a blog entry on Chikara's official website, Loudspeaker announced that he had started training at The Wrestle Factory under the likes of Green Ant and Hallowicked, while also making a plea for Donst's longtime associate Jakob Hammermeier to come to his senses and realize that Donst was not his friend. On May 24, Chikara announced an added stipulation for the match, where the loser would have his hair shaved off.

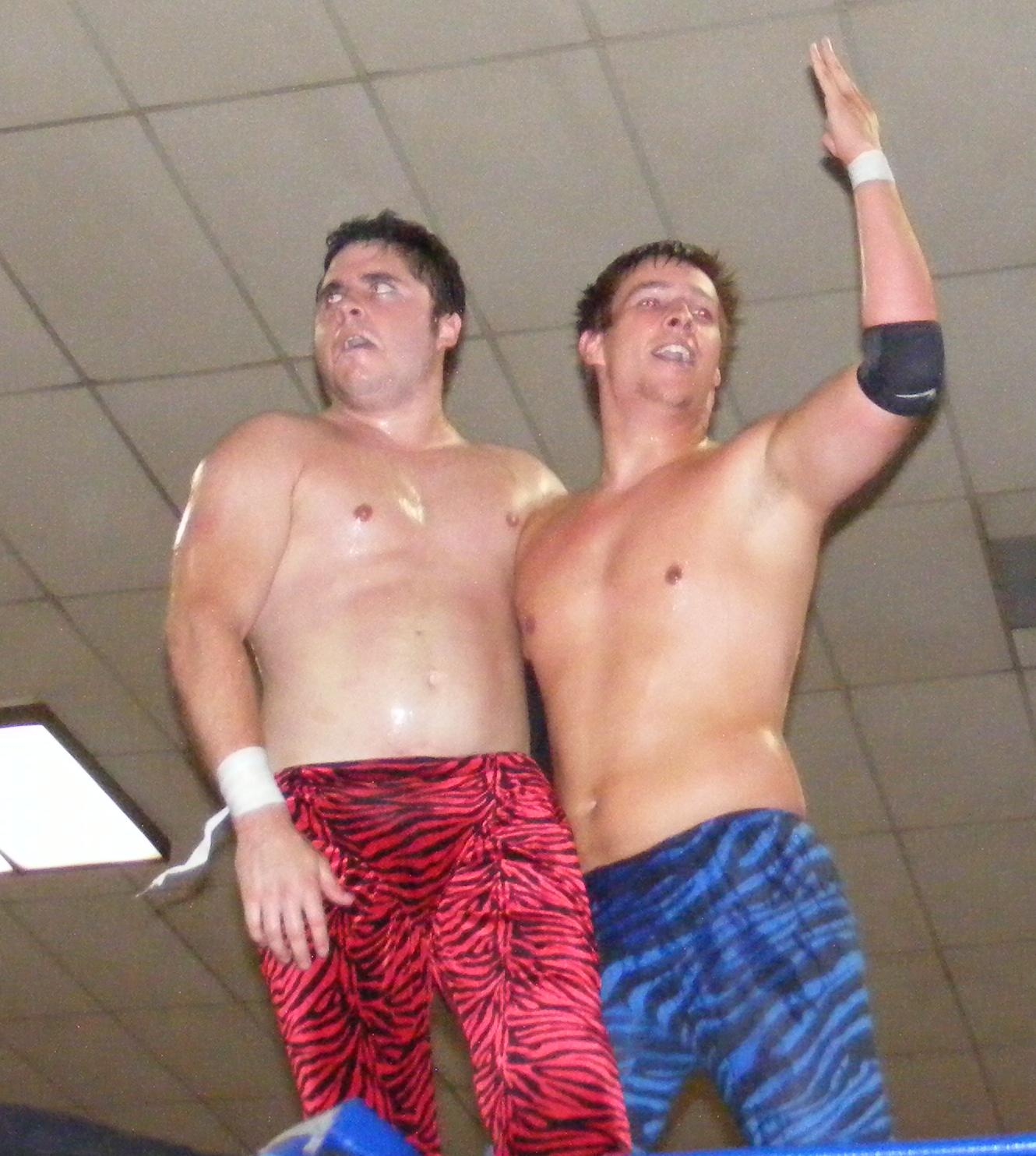
(Left to right) Shane Matthews and Scott Parker of 3.0, the defending Campeones de Parejas, heading into Aniversario: Never Compromise

The third title match for Aniversario: Never Compromise was announced on May 18 and saw Pieces of Hate (Jigsaw and The Shard) challenge 3.0 (Scott Parker and Shane Matthews) for the Chikara Campeonatos de Parejas. Following Under the Hood, the rudo stable Gekido was effectively dissolved, with assailAnt and Soldier Ant moving onto the Colony: Xtreme Force storyline, while Jigsaw and The Shard became a full-time tag team, dubbing themselves "Pieces of Hate". For the first four months of 2013, Jigsaw and The Shard continued their rivalry with Mike Quackenbush from 2012, culminating in a main event tag team match on April 6, where they were defeated by Quackenbush and his surprise tag team partner, Jushin Thunder Liger. Now with zero points, Jigsaw and The Shard began their climb back up towards a shot at the Campeonatos de Parejas by defeating assailAnt and Fire Ant of The Colony on May 4. In Chikara, teams need three points, or three back-to-back wins, in order to be eligible to challenge for the promotion's tag team championship, the Campeonatos de Parejas. On May 18, Pieces of Hate took part in the 2013 Tag World Grand Prix, defeating Da Soul Touchaz (Acid Jaz and Marshe Rockett) in the opening round, AC/DC (Arik Cannon and Darin Corbin) in the second round and, after receiving a bye in the semifinals, The Young Bucks (Matt Jackson and Nick Jackson) in the finals to win the tournament, racking up four points in the process. Following the win, Jigsaw announced that they were cashing in their points and challenging the defending Campeones de Parejas, 3.0, for the title at Aniversario: Never Compromise. The match was made official three days later. As with all matches for the Campeonatos de Parejas, the match would take place under two out of three falls rules.

The Tag World Grand Prix also led to the seventh match announced for the event, when The Colony (Fire Ant and Green Ant) and the Devastation Corporation (Blaster McMassive and Max Smashmaster) eliminated each other from the tournament after their match ended in a no contest (which resulted in Pieces of Hate getting their bye in the semifinals). On May 22, Chikara announced a six-man tag team match for Aniversario: Never Compromise, where assailAnt, Fire Ant and Green Ant take on McMassive, Smashmaster and Flex Rumblecrunch, the newest member of the Devastation Corporation, who made an appearance at Under the Hood, but was not named until the Tag World Grand Prix.

On May 29, Chikara announced the eighth and final match for the event, a grudge match between Dasher Hatfield and Delirious. This was a rematch from the season opener on February 9, 2013, when Hatfield defeated Delirious in less than a minute, after which he was assaulted by both Delirious and Kobald. Afterwards, Hatfield was sidelined for two months with a rib injury, while Delirious made no appearances for Chikara prior to Aniversario: Never Compromise.

== Event ==
Other on-screen personnel
Role:	Name:
Commentators	Bryce Remsburg
Commentators	Dasher Hatfield
Commentators	Gavin Loudspeaker
Commentators	Leonard F. Chikarason
Commentators	Wink Vavasseur
Ring announcers	Brendan O'Donnell
Ring announcers	Gavin Loudspeaker
Ring announcers	Leonard F. Chikarason
Referees	Bryce Remsburg
Referees	Daniel Yost
Referees	Jonathan Barber

=== Pre-show ===
The thirty-minute "Freeview A-Go-Go" pre-show featured the first match of the evening, which saw Mark Angelosetti defeat Saturyne, after countering a frankensteiner into a sunset flip, to retain the Chikara Young Lions Cup.

=== Preliminary matches ===
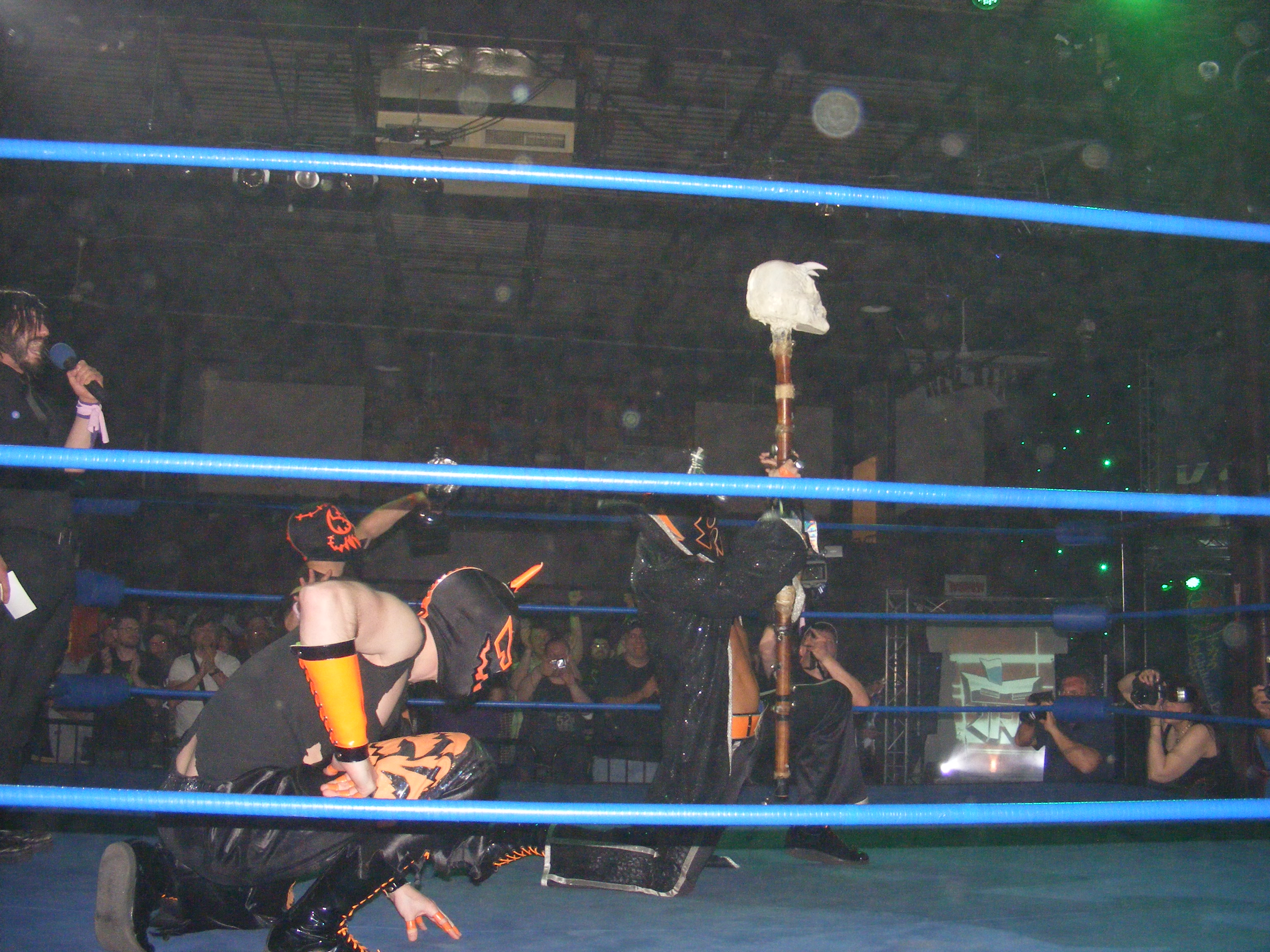
The Spectral Envoy, who were victorious in the "Battle for Trios Supremacy" at Aniversario: Never Compromise

The first match of the pay-per-view itself saw The Spectral Envoy (Frightmare, Hallowicked and UltraMantis Black) take on The Colony: Xtreme Force (Arctic Rescue Ant, Missile Assault Ant and Orbit Adventure Ant). Conspicuous by his absence was The Colony: Xtreme Force leader deviAnt. The 2012 King of Trios ended up winning the match, when Hallowicked submitted Orbit Adventure Ant with the Chikara Special.

The second match saw Dasher Hatfield take on Delirious in singles action. Towards the end of the match, as Hatfield was delivering a series of chops to his cornered opponent, the referee stepped between the two to separate them. While the referee was distracted, Kobald entered the ring to attack Hatfield with a spear, leading to Delirious hitting him with the Shadows Over Heck for the win.

In the third match of the pay-per-view, The Colony (assailAnt, Fire Ant and Green Ant) took on The Devastation Corporation (Blaster McMassive, Flex Rumblecrunch and Max Smashmaster), who were accompanied by Sidney Bakabella. The match started outside the ring, where Smashmaster and Fire Ant first brawled backstage and when they returned, Smashmaster threw Fire Ant off the entrance stage onto the other participants in the match. Shortly afterwards, Green Ant climbed up to a balcony and dove off it onto the wrestlers brawling on the floor. Towards the end of the match, Bakabella broke up The Colony's signature triple-team finishing maneuver, the Ant Hill. As Green Ant was going for his own finishing maneuver, the cloverleaf, on one of his opponents, Bakabella once again went to interfere, but was hit with a superkick from Green Ant, who then dropped McMassive with a German suplex, before locking him in the cloverleaf for a submission win.

Next up was the Sarcophagus match between former partners Amasis and Ophidian, which was preceded by a hype video. The only way the match could be won was by locking your opponent inside a sarcophagus, which was situated ringside. The match again featured interference from Kobald, who towards the end of the match accidentally speared Ophidian, when Amasis ducked out of his way. After Amasis had removed Kobald from the ring, Ophidian tried his signature hypnosis on him, which seemed to work. Under the spell, Amasis laid inside the sarcophagus, but before Ophidian could close the lid and win the match, he came to his senses, kicked Ophidian away and climbed out. Having seen his plan foiled, Ophidian gave up and screamed at his former partner to "just kill [him] already". Amasis then removed Ophidian's mask, revealing Amasis' old mask underneath, before throwing him inside the sarcophagus and closing the lid to win the match.

Following an intermission, the fifth match of the pay-per-view was the Hair vs. Hair match between Gavin Loudspeaker and Tim Donst, who was accompanied to the ring by his allies Jakob Hammermeier, Steve "The Turtle" Weiner and Veronica. Donst dominated most of the match, during which he also abused Weiner ringside. At the end of the match, Donst climbed to the top rope and ordered Hammermeier into the ring. However, Hammermeier ended up turning on Donst and punching him, which was followed by Loudspeaker dropping him to the mat with a superplex, which was enough for a three count and a win. After the match, Veronica slapped Donst and both she and Weiner walked out on him. The segment ended with Donst having his head shaved inside the ring, exactly one year after losing his hair at Chikarasaurus Rex: How to Hatch a Dinosaur, while Loudspeaker was helped backstage.

Before the next match, former Chikara referee Derek Sabato, who had the previous day mentioned an "interesting phone call" on his Twitter page, entered the ring to say something about "the company that owns Chikara". He then produced the envelope, which had been given to Mike Quackenbush by No Private Army before his dismissal from the promotion and revealed its contents, a photo of Titor Conglomerate executives at a ground breaking, which he then proceeded to release to the public on his Twitter page, while still in the ring. Wink Vavasseur then led Chikara officials to the ring to escort Sabato out of the arena, ending the segment.

=== Main event matches ===
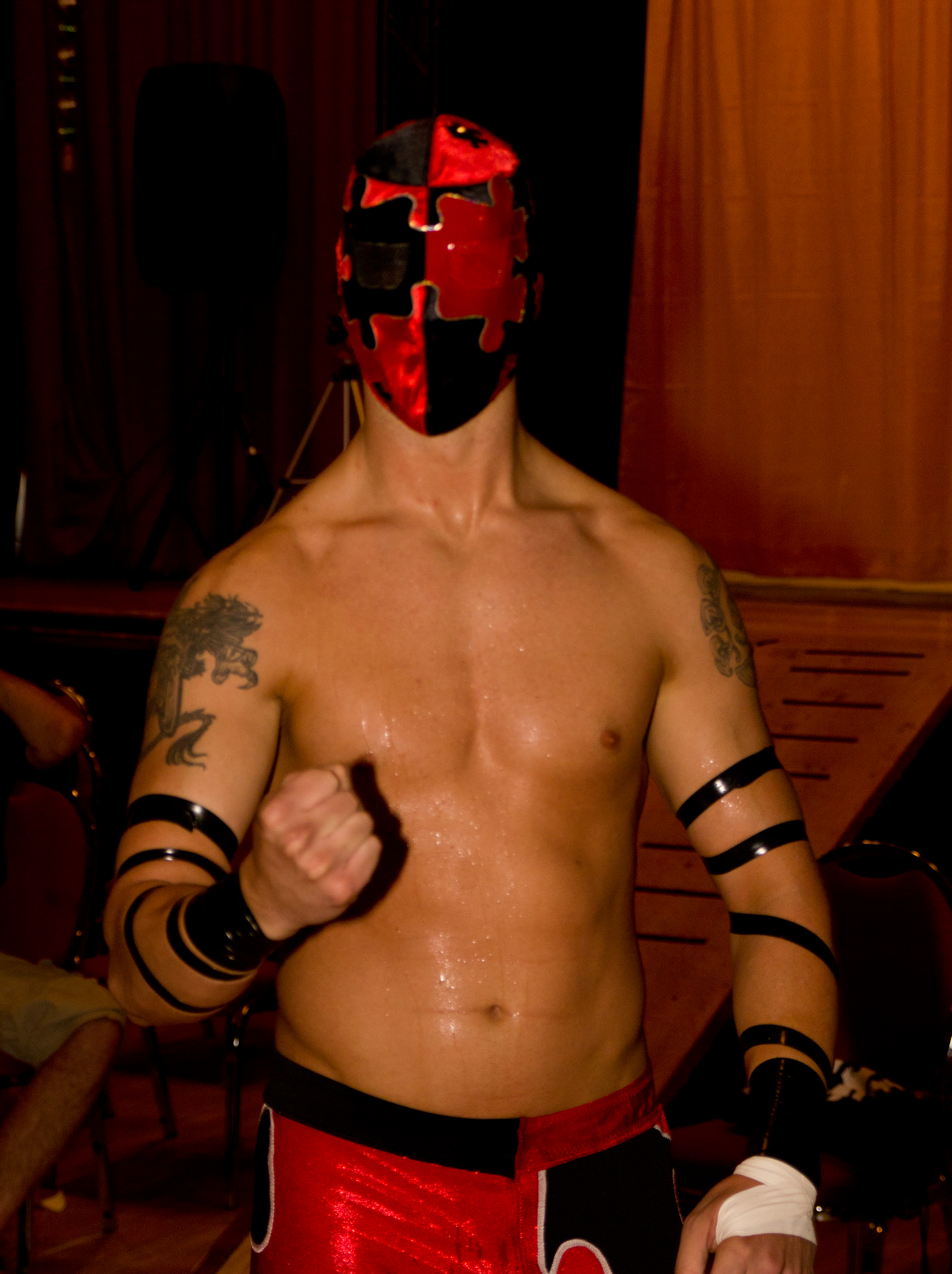
Jigsaw, who was crowned one half of the new Campeones de Parejas at Aniversario: Never Compromise

The first title match of the pay-per-view saw 3.0 (Scott Parker and Shane Matthews) defend the Chikara Campeonatos de Parejas against Pieces of Hate (Jigsaw and The Shard) in a two out of three falls match. The challengers won the first fall, when The Shard surprised Parker with a roll-up. Before the start of the second fall, The Shard attacked Parker's ankle, leaving him lying on the floor outside the ring for most of the fall, during which Pieces of Hate concentrated on attacking Matthews' ankle. Eventually, Parker managed to return to the match and fired a comeback, which ended with him and Matthews performing their double-team finishing maneuver, the Sweet Taste o' Professionalism, on The Shard to win the second fall and tie the score. In the third fall, Jigsaw removed Parker from the ring, before hitting a superkick on Matthews, whom The Shard then locked in an ankle lock. After The Shard added a grapevine to the hold, Matthews went unconscious, giving Pieces of Hate the third fall and the match and making them the new Campeones de Parejas.

Before the main event of the evening, Chikara plugged the second annual National Pro Wrestling Day, which takes place February 1, 2014.

The final match of the pay-per-view saw Icarus challenge Eddie Kingston for the Chikara Grand Championship in what would mark Kingston's fourteenth title defense. Marty Jannetty, who had announced he would accompany Icarus to the match, did not come out with the challenger, who was wearing a new Jannetty-inspired attire. Towards the end of the match, Kingston accidentally hit referee Bryce Remsburg, in storyline knocking him unconscious. Kingston then left the ring, took a steel chair from ringside, which had been left there for Jannetty, returned to the ring and hit Icarus in the back with it. Icarus tried to absorb the shot and fire back, but was stopped with another chair shot. Kingston then hit Icarus with a knee strike to the back of the head and went for a pin, but the challenger managed to kick out, before Remsburg could make a three count. Kingston hit Icarus with a Saito suplex, but again he managed to kick out of the following pin attempt. Icarus then dropped Kingston with a headscissors takedown, before locking him in the Chikara Special submission hold. As Remsburg was checking whether Kingston was still conscious, over twenty members of the Condor Security entered the arena, removed both competitors and the referee from the ring and then began taking the set down as a disheveled looking Vavasseur observed the scene ringside. Just as commentators Leonard F. Chikarason and Dasher Hatfield mentioned spotting Archibald Peck, who had not been seen since his failed challenge at the Grand Championship, arriving at the scene, the Smart Mark Video stream went to black bringing an abrupt end to the match and the pay-per-view.

== Reception ==
Pro Wrestling Insider's Mike Johnson gave Aniversario: Never Compromise a mostly positive review, calling the match between The Colony and The Devastation Corporation "really fun brawl mixed with some crazy spots" and the Campeonatos de Parejas match a "really good back and forth tag match with a nice story told". Negatives mentioned by Johnson included the dark lighting at the Trocadero Theatre and the Sarcophagus match being "at times a little too long in the tooth". 411Mania's TJ Hawke echoed Johnson's sentiments, awarding the match between The Colony and The Devastation Corporation the highest score of four out of five stars, while writing that the Sarcophagus match was "not good. It was long and the crowd barely responded to any of it". Hawke also praised the Campeonatos de Parejas match and the match between Gavin Loudspeaker and Tim Donst, which he called "fantastic", awarding it three and a half stars. Bryan Alvarez of Figure Four Weekly, when reviewing the show-closing angle, noted that Chikara set up the earliest "fake webpage" for the angle in 2007 and stated that the amount of work gone into the storyline from start to Aniversario: Never Compromise was "almost mind-boggling". Kevin Ford of 411Mania gave the event a final score of 8.3 out of 10 and wrote "[t]his was one of the most solid shows they have had in a very long time with most matches overdelivering. The ending itself is going to be extremely polarizing, but strictly from the quality of the matches and from a historical standpoint I can say this is definitely a show worth checking out."

== Aftermath ==
After the pay-per-view went off the air, the Condor Security began shooing fans out of the Trocadero Theatre. Some of the Chikara staff continued playing up the storyline outside of the arena with referee Bryce Remsburg rushing away in tears, while quiz host Billy Kumohara claimed that he had been fired for standing up to the Condor Security. Pro Wrestling Insider reported that some fans were particularly upset with the closing angle, with one fan breaking one of the Trocadero Theatre's glass doors. Chikara continued the storyline the following day on its official website, "canceling" all events scheduled for the rest of 2013. Though tickets had been put on sale for the events prior to Aniversario: Never Compromise, fans had not been able to purchase them. To help push the storyline, the promotion's physical assets, including the set and audio equipment, were also supposedly put on sale by The Titor Conglomerate. In the days that followed Aniversario: Never Compromise, confusion and speculation arose in the professional wrestling world as to what the show's closing angle meant for the future of Chikara. Insider newsletters such as Pro Wrestling Insider and Wrestling Observer Newsletter speculated on a number of possibilities from the legitimate closing of the promotion to a "comic book style reboot". Bryan Alvarez of the Figure Four Weekly newsletter reported speaking to people close to Chikara founder and booker Mike Quackenbush who "don't have any idea where [the storyline] is going, but feel that [Quackenbush] is trying to do something big, something never done before in wrestling". According to Pro Wrestling Insider, members of the Chikara roster were asked to sign non-disclosure agreements before the pay-per-view to help keep future developments a secret. Chikara remained largely quiet the days following the iPPV, responding only to some of the rumors with the statement "[t]here is no issue regarding ownership of the Chikara name, brand, its assets or intellectual properties. Any speculation to the contrary is 100% false". Though Chikara did not hold any official events for the rest of 2013, the promotion's wrestlers, led by Icarus, who had held fan gatherings in July and September, petitioning for the return of Chikara, held a small "guerrilla event" in Philadelphia's Franklin Delano Roosevelt Park on November 2 with the storyline being that they were fighting Wink Vavasseur to bring back the promotion full-time. The event aired live on Ustream. It was then announced that on November 30 in Philadelphia there would be a citywide fan scavenger hunt that would "decide the future" of Chikara.

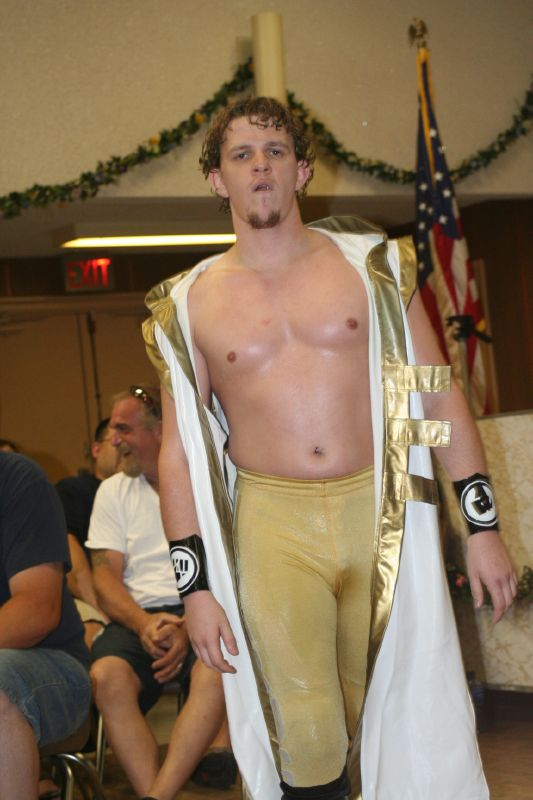
Icarus, a former top villain who emerged as the lead hero in the storyline to bring Chikara back

The storyline following Aniversario: Never Compromise was that Derek Sabato had exposed the Titor Conglomerate by showing a connection between its executives and Condor Security's new extremist compound, leaving the Vavasseurs scrambling to cover their tracks. The Titor Conglomerate went into hiding, distanced themselves from WMD and put the Chikara brand, its related intellectual properties and remaining physical assets on sale, reducing the promotion to ashes. Following Aniversario: Never Compromise many Chikara wrestlers began working for its seven "Wrestling is" sister promotions. In the autumn of 2013, several Chikara rudos of the past began emerging in these promotions and shutting them down. First Gekido returned to Wrestling is Intense on September 15, took over the show and forced to promotion to shut down in a scene reminiscent of the closing moments of Aniversario: Never Compromise, then Kaiju Big Battel's Dr. Cube stole Wrestling is Awesome's money and assets, bankrupting them, Sinn Bodhi took over Wrestling is Art and shut it down and in December Wrestling is Cool owner Milo Schnitzler revealed himself aligned with Bruderschaft des Kreuzes (BDK) and shut the promotion down under command from the stable's leader, Ares. The united rudo group then began threatening the biggest and original Wrestling is promotion, Wrestling is Fun! (WiF!), but their attack on January 18, 2014, was thwarted by a group of defenders, led by Icarus. The following day, Wrestling is Respect was shut down, when Sidney Bakabella's Wrecking Crew (The Devastation Corporation, Jaka and Oleg the Usurper) turned on the defenders and joined the rudo group. On February 1, 2014, the second National Pro Wrestling Day concluded in an angle, where the group of rudos, now made up of BDK, The Colony: Xtreme Force, Dr. Cube and his Posse, Gekido, Sidney Bakabella's Wrecking Crew and Sinn Bodhi and his Odditorium stable and led by Jimmy Jacobs, stormed the event to destroy the final remnants of Chikara. This led to several Chikara wrestlers, including rudos The Batiri, Los Ice Creams and Mark Angelosetti and tecnicos The Colony, Dasher Hatfield, Hallowicked and Icarus running in to attack the group. Finally the Chikara side was also joined by 3.0, who arrived on the scene in a DeLorean with Archibald Peck, implying that they had gone back in time to retrieve him. After the invading group had been driven out of the ring, Icarus declared that Chikara was coming back on May 25, 2014, signaling the end of the promotion's one-year-long hiatus. It was later revealed that in storyline former Chikara wrestler Robbie Ellis had won the auction in December 2013 and purchased the promotion from WMD, making the return possible. Chikara booker Mike Quackenbush later explained that the idea behind the storyline was to "expand what our performance art is capable of", while admitting that its complexity probably led to the promotion losing a few followers. Quackenbush also dispelled rumors that the promotion's downtime was due to financial difficulties, noting that while the Chikara brand appeared to be dark, it put together a record number of live events through the "Wrestling is" network, while also claiming that the downtime was just "a necessary part of the story". According to Quackenbush he had realized that the single character in the Chikara universe that people had the most emotional investment in was not a wrestler, but the brand itself and as a storyteller his idea was to put the protagonist under a real threat, driving the audience on an emotional journey. Quackenbush also revealed that the storyline was heavily influenced by the third act of the comic book Watchmen. While Chikara was inactive, the storyline was chronicled in a YouTube series, titled Ashes. An extended movie version of the series, titled The Ashes of Chikara, premiered on May 5 in Collegeville, Pennsylvania and was made available for purchase four days later.

The storyline rivalry between Amasis and Ophidian concluded with Aniversario: Never Compromise with the two reuniting in Wrestling is Cool (WiC) on July 21, after which they went on to wrestle together for promotions such as Combat Zone Wrestling (CZW) and Dragon Gate USA.

== Results ==
No.	Results	Stipulations	Times
1^{P}	Mark Angelosetti (c) (with Dasher Hatfield) defeated Saturyne	Singles match for the Chikara Young Lions Cup	09:10
2	The Spectral Envoy (Frightmare, Hallowicked and UltraMantis Black) defeated The Colony: Xtreme Force (Arctic Rescue Ant, Missile Assault Ant and Orbit Adventure Ant)	Six-man tag team match	09:35
3	Delirious defeated Dasher Hatfield	Singles match	12:24
4	The Colony (assailAnt, Fire Ant and Green Ant) defeated The Devastation Corporation (Blaster McMassive, Flex Rumblecrunch and Max Smashmaster) (with Sidney Bakabella)	Six-man tag team match	12:42
5	Amasis defeated Ophidian	Sarcophagus match	31:50
6	Gavin Loudspeaker defeated Tim Donst (with Jakob Hammermeier, Steve Weiner and Veronica)	Hair vs. Hair match	10:20
7	Pieces of Hate (Jigsaw and The Shard) defeated 3.0 (Scott Parker and Shane Matthews) (c)	Two out of three falls tag team match for the Chikara Campeonatos de Parejas	17:14
8	Eddie Kingston (c) vs. Icarus ended in a no contest	Singles match for the Chikara Grand Championship	19:18
(c) / – the champion(s) heading into the match; P / – the match was broadcast on the pre-show
