= Jolo (disambiguation) =

Jolo is a volcanic island in the Philippines.

Jolo may also refer to:

- Jolo, Sulu, a municipality in Jolo Island
- Jolo Group of Volcanoes, in Jolo Island
- Jolo, West Virginia, an unincorporated community
- Jolo (writer) (Jan Olof Olsson, 1920–1974), Swedish writer and journalist
- Jolo Mendoza, Filipino basketball player
- Jolo Revilla, Filipino actor and politician
- "#JOLO", an episode of Family Guy

== See also ==
- Yolo (disambiguation)
