= Yulo =

Yulo is a surname of Filipino origin.

== People with the surname ==
- Carlos Yulo (born 2000), Filipino artistic gymnast
- Dino Yulo (born 1963), Filipino politician
- Eldrew Yulo (born 2008), Filipino artistic gymnast
- Jill Yulo (born 1989), Filipina actress
- José Yulo (1894–1976), Chief Justice of the Supreme Court of the Philippines
- Mariano Yulo (1873–1929), Filipino doctor and politician
- Menchu Lauchengco-Yulo (born 1963), Filipina musical theatre actress
- Toni Yulo-Loyzaga, Filipina government official

== See also ==
- Yulo's Park
- Yoko
- Yolo
- SM Santa Rosa Yulo
