= You Only Die Twice =

You Only Die Twice may refer to:

- "You Only Die Twice", an episode from American TV series Scarecrow and Mrs. King
- "You Only Die Twice", a 1984 Rogue Trooper story in British comic 2000 AD
- You Only Die Twice, a novel by Ryan Hughes based on the video game Shadow Warrior
- You Only Die Twice, a 2001 Britt Montero Series novel by Edna Buchanan
- The Genius Files: You Only Die Twice, book 3 of the Genius Files series by American author Dan Gutman

== See also ==
- You Only Live Twice (disambiguation), a James Bond novel and film that most of the above titles reference
