= You Only Live Once (book) =

2016 book by Jason Vitug

You Only Live Once: The Roadmap to Financial Wellness and a Purposeful Life
- Author: Jason Vitug
- Language: English
- Genre: Self-help, personal finance, lifestyle, millennials
- Publisher: John Wiley & Sons
- Publication date: June 7, 2016
- Publication place: United States
- Media type: Hardback
- Pages: 192
- ISBN: 978-1-119-26736-2
- OCLC: 933273616
- LC Class: HG179.V5882016

You Only Live Once: The Roadmap to Financial Wellness and a Purposeful Life is a 2016 book written by Jason Vitug. The book sets to redefine the YOLO mantra that has been used to define millennials, to set a mindset shift to cultivate a healthy and wealthy lifestyle for a lifetime. The book focuses on a three step process called ACT, an acronym for awareness, creating a plan, and taking control steps, outlined by the author. The books aim is to make readers define the life they want to live before setting financial goals. You Only Live Once: The Roadmap to Financial Wellness and a Purposeful Life is written in a simple conversation tone based on Vitug's financial experiences and conversations with others

== Summary ==
The book is based on Vitug's financial experiences and conversations with others about their money and life goals. It chronicles a road trip across the country in 2016 in which he traveled 10,218 miles promoting the idea of financial wellness. The focus of the book is to highlight financial wellness as a philosophy of achieving a balance between health and wealth. The main premise has been to make readers understand their values before setting financial goals and using a budgeting method that aligns to their values.

Among some of the book's topics are:

- Jason Vitug's personal story, experiences with money and debt, and his ultimate awareness to change his money behaviors.
- The importance of financial wellness and financial education
- Challenging existing money beliefs such as money as not an end goal but a tool
- Gaining clarity of values, setting financial goals that align to one's values, and creating a financial plan to achieve desired life and money goals
- Increasing your personal and financial awareness around things you desire and your actual financial numbers
- Creating a budget reflective of your desired lifestyle and tips to reduce expenses and create more income
- Techniques to remain mindful in spending, savings, and investing, and achieving financial freedom for a year.

Vitug emphasis is on increasing awareness in money beliefs and changing financial behaviors that prevent people from achieving goals.

== Reception ==
=== Praise and support ===
You Only Live Once: The Roadmap to Financial Wellness and a Purposeful Life has sold thousands of books and received overall positive reviews from critics. The book has been reviewed by The New York Times. The Financial Post named the book as one of the Top 5 Best Books in Personal Finance and Economics in 2016, and reviewed by PscyhCentral as "Overall, this is an easy read, particularly for a book about finances. Some of the ideas and concepts do seem a bit simplistic and idealistic, but there is plenty of straightforward, reasonable advice to make it a worthwhile book."

In a positive review, Jonathan Chevreau of the Financial Post wrote, "He's dispensing old wine in a new bottle, but for his audience of financial newbies — his target audience is people in their 20s and early 30s — it's still a valuable message."

== Bibliography ==
- You Only Live Once: The Roadmap to Financial Wellness and a Purposeful Life, by Jason Vitug. John Wiley & Sons, 2016. ISBN 978-1-119-26736-2
