= Mark Angelosetti =

American professional wrestler

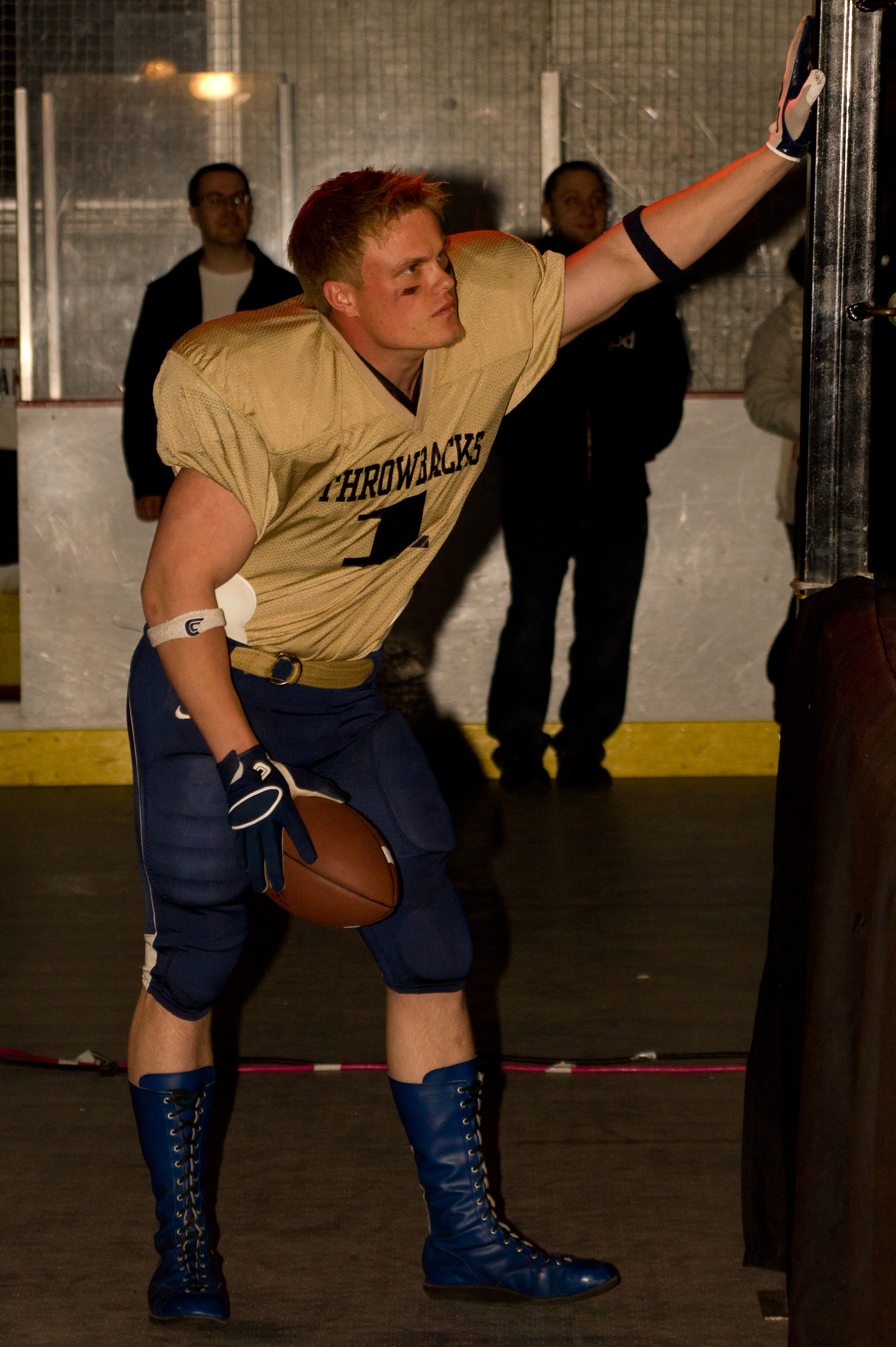
- Angelosetti in March 2012

Personal information
- Born: July 9, 1988 (age 38) Allentown, Pennsylvania, U.S.

Professional wrestling career
- Ring name(s): Mark Angel; Mark Angelosetti; Mr. Touchdown
- Billed height: 5 ft 11 in (1.80 m)
- Billed weight: 207 lb (94 kg)
- Billed from: "Touchdown City, USA"
- Trained by: Mike Quackenbush; Claudio Castagnoli
- Debut: October 2007
- Retired: 2019

Mark Angelosetti (born July 9, 1988) is an American retired professional wrestler, also known by the ring name Mr. Touchdown. Angelosetti primarily worked for Chikara, where he is a former Grand Champion, a former one-time Campeon de Parejas and a Young Lions Cup Champion. Angelosetti has also worked for other independent promotions, including Beyond Wrestling and Wrestling is Fun!. His gimmick was that of a football player.

== Professional wrestling career ==
=== Chikara (2012–2019) ===
In March, Archibald Peck's valet, Veronica had begun showing interest in Angelosetti, breaking off the relationship between herself and Peck. Both men started a feud to prove to Veronica who is the toughest. Peck changed his gimmick to Mixed Martial Archie, using MMA during his matches. They fought at "I'll Be a Mummy's Uncle", which Mark won via DQ due to Archie being disqualified for excessive punishment, after refusing to stop ground-and-pounding. After the match Veronica walked out with Mark and started to flirt with him. On June 2 at Chikara's second internet pay-per-view, Chikarasaurus Rex: How to Hatch a Dinosaur, The Throwbacks defeated the team of Mixed Martial Archie and Colt Cabana in a match where the man who received the pinfall, must leave Chikara. While the referee was distracted, Mark hit Archie with his helmet and Hatfield pinned him for the win. Following the match, Veronica kissed her new boyfriend Angelosetti, while the dejected Archie walked out of the arena.

On June 24, 2012, Angelosetti entered in the Chikara Young Lions Cup X tournament, defeating Jason Axe, Ryan Rush and Tripp Cassidy in the first round. Angelosetti defeated Anthony Stone on August 17, 2012 and defeated A. C. H. in the finals, winning the Young Lions Cup. On July 13, 2012, Angelosetti defeated Green Ant, to become the inaugural Banana Champion for Chikara's sister group Wrestling is Fun!. On September 14, 2012, The Throwbacks and Matt Classic entered the 2012 King of Trios, losing to Team JWP (Command Bolshoi, Kaori Yoneyama and Tsubasa Kuragaki) in their first round match. After this, Mark started a feud with ACH and Veronica started to filtering with The Mysterious and Handsome Stranger. Mark defeated ACH at Under the Hood in a match for the Young Lions Cup. After the match, Stranger appeared and humiliated Veronica, revealing himself as Archibald Peck. On March 23, 2013, Angelosetti lost the Banana Championship to assailANT. On June 2, 2013, Angelosetti retained the Young Lions Cup against Saturyne at Aniversario: Never Compromise. Following the event, Chikara went on a break (and the Cup was deactivated), which lasted until May 2014. On July 20, Angelosetti and Dasher Hatfield defeated the Pieces of Hate (Jigsaw and The Shard) to win the Chikara Campeonatos de Parejas. In September, Angelosetti and Hatfield teamed up with Chikara Grand Champion Icarus as the Golden Trio for the 2014 King of Trios. The team made it all the way to the finals of the tournament, before losing to the Devastation Corporation (Blaster McMassive, Flex Rumblecrunch and Max Smashmaster). On December 6 at Tomorrow Never Dies, the Throwbacks lost the Campeonatos de Parejas to McMassive and Smashmaster. On August 11, 2018, Angelosetti defeated Juan Francisco de Coronado for the Chikara Grand Championship. However, he would not compete during his reign, being Hatfield crowned as Interim Champion. On April 5, 2019, Hatfield defeated Angelosetti in a Ladder Match to claim the title. This was Angelosetti final match.

In 2020, his tag team partner A VeryGood Professional Wrestler (FKA Dasher Hatfield) revealed that Angelosetti retired from wrestling.

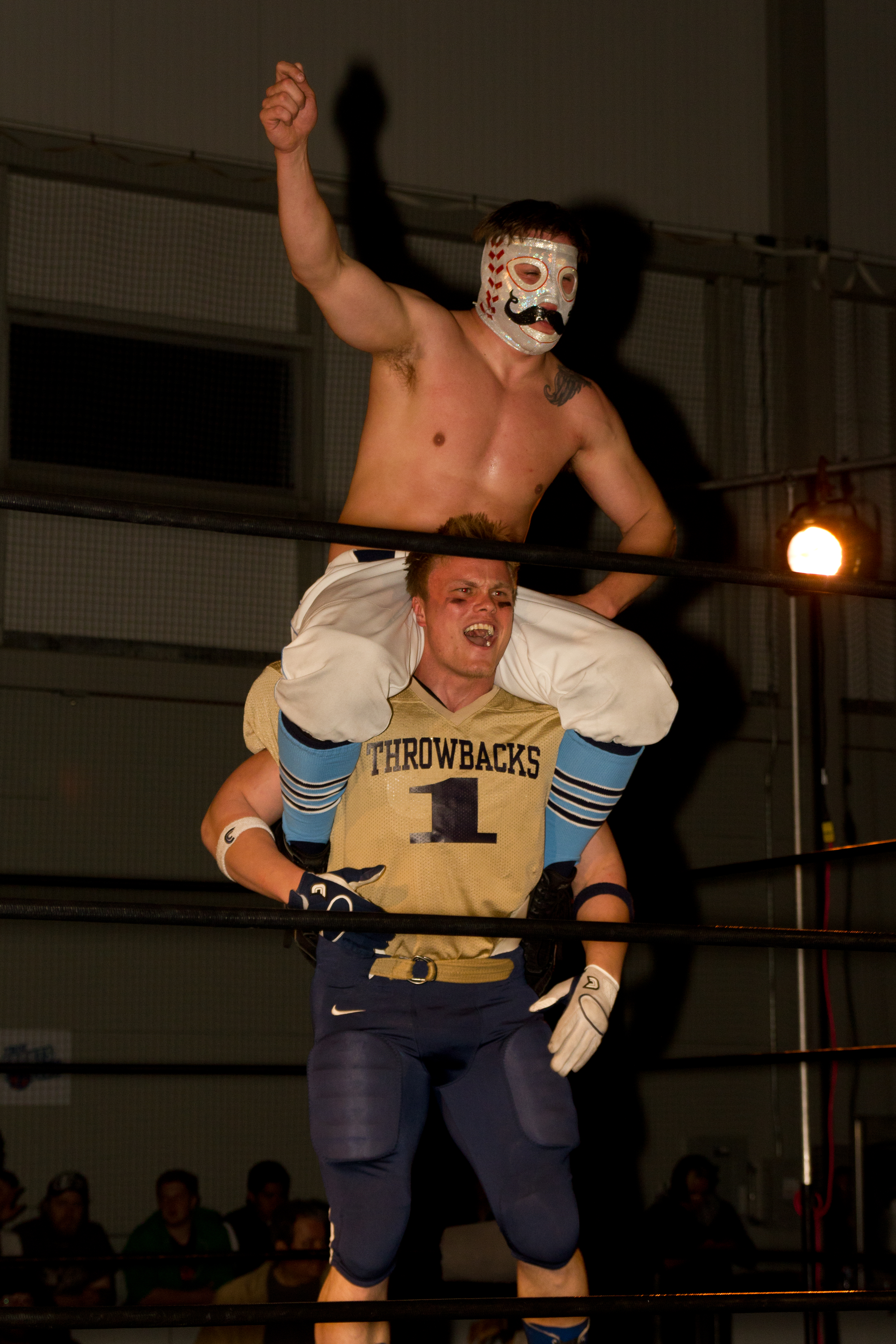
Angelosetti with Dasher Hatfield, as The Throwbacks

== Championships and accomplishments ==
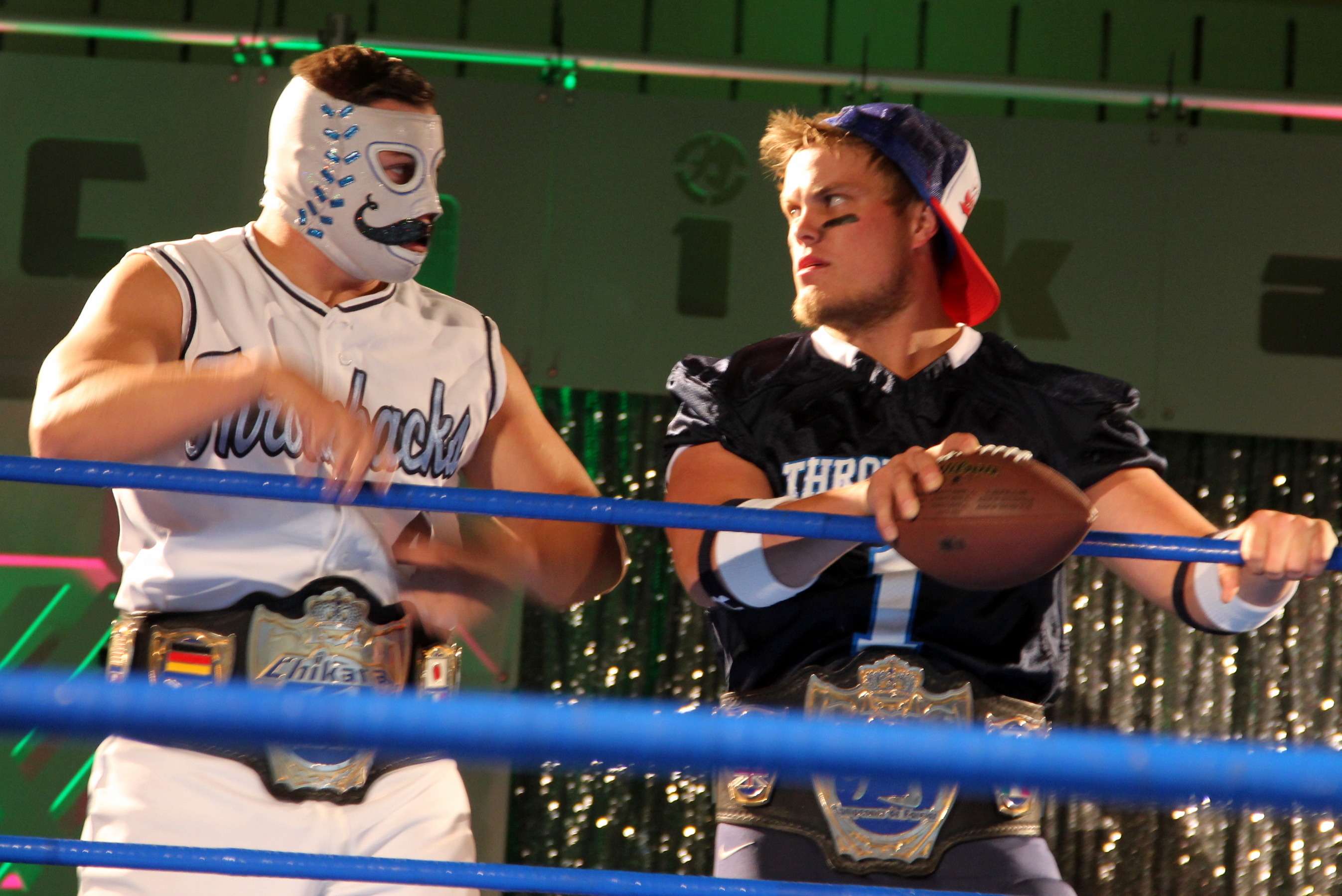
Angelosetti and Dasher Hatfield as the Chikara Campeones de Parejas

- Chikara
  - Chikara Grand Championship (1 time)
  - Chikara Campeonatos de Parejas (1 time) – with Dasher Hatfield
  - Chikara Young Lions Cup (1 time)
  - Tag World Grand Prix (2014) – with Dasher Hatfield
- Pro Wrestling Illustrated
  - Ranked No. 461 of the top 500 singles wrestlers in the PWI 500 in 2019
- Wrestling is Fun!
  - 24/7 Championship (1 time)
  - WiF! Banana Championship (1 time)
