= Yolo City =

Yolo City may refer to:

- Woodland, California, formerly called Yolo City
- Yolo, California, an unincorporated community
