= Unsolved Mysteries (band) =

American pop duo

- Origin: Brooklyn, New York, United States
- Genres: Pop, Electronic, Alternative
- Years active: 2004–present
- Label: Unsigned
- Members: Jon Lynn, Colin Alexander
- Website: jonlynnjonlynn.com

Unsolved Mysteries is a pop duo from Brooklyn in New York City. Formed in 2004 as a solo project of Jon Lynn, it was later joined by producer Colin Alexander.

Their song "You Only Live Once" was used on the American TV series Skins on episode 7, "Michelle."

== Discography ==
Studio Albums

- Lost Love (2006)
- Tragic Trouble (2010)

== Videography ==
Year	Title	Director
2010	"You Only Live Once"	Ryan Dickie
