= Jervis Cottonbelly =

Wrestling gimmick

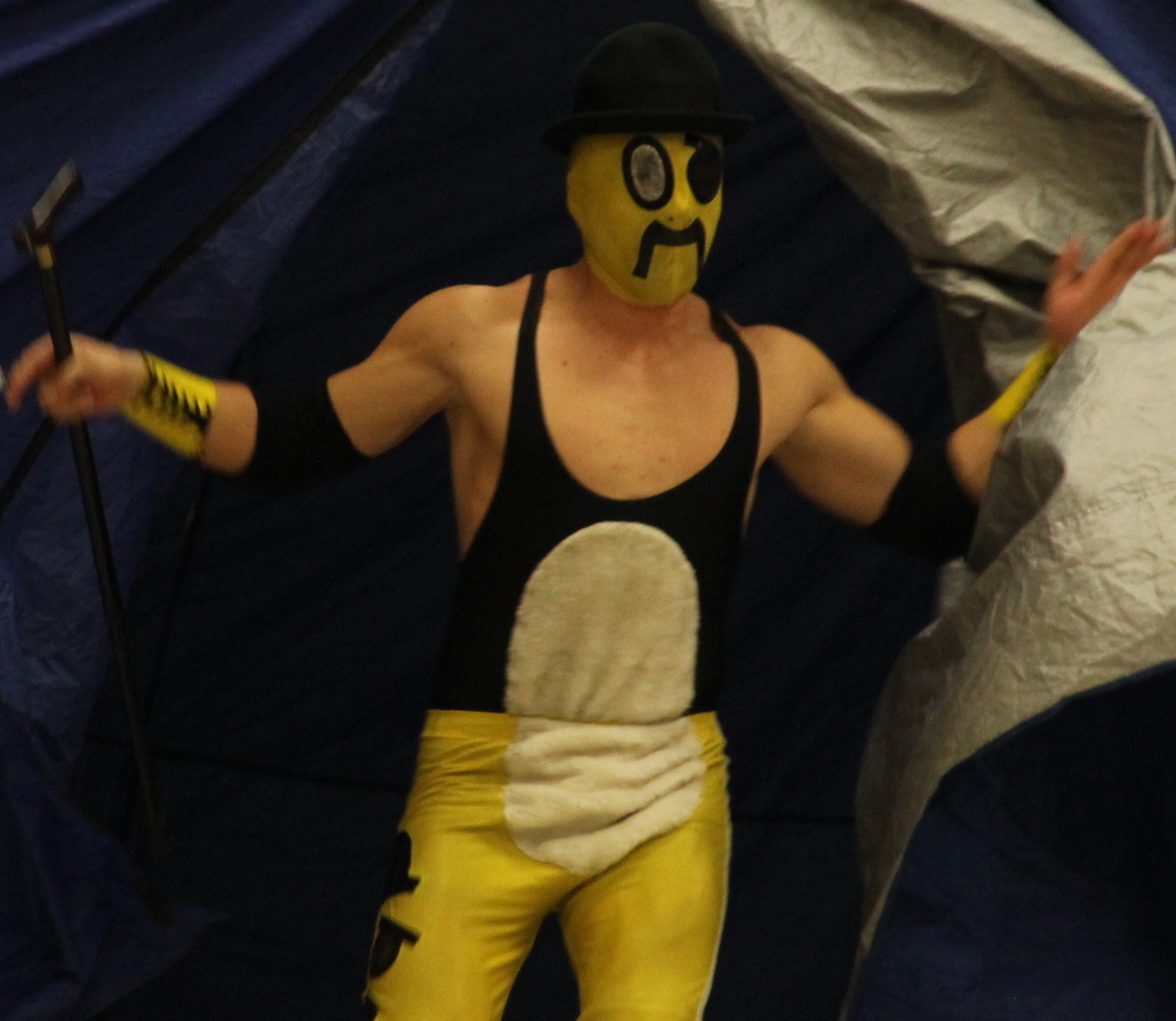
- Cottonbelly in 2013

Professional wrestling career
- Ring name(s): Gentleman Jervis; Jervis Cottonbelly
- Billed height: 6 ft 0 in (183 cm)
- Billed weight: 14 st 4 lb (200 lb; 91 kg)
- Billed from: London, England
- Trained by: Drew Gulak; Mike Quackenbush
- Debut: 2005

Jervis Cottonbelly is a professional wrestling gimmick that originates from Chikara. He has appeared in several independent promotions including Championship Wrestling from Hollywood. The masked persona was originally portrayed in the 2000s by TJ Cain, until the 2010s when the independent, wrestler Kevin Condron (also known as Snowflake and Kid Cyclone) started portraying it. Condron also adopted the name Gentleman Jervis for the character.

== Professional wrestling career ==
=== Chikara (2005–2016) ===
On September 16, 2005, Cottonbelly made his debut at Chikara's Son of The International Invasion of The International Invaders: Stage I, when he unsuccessfully challenged Larry Sweeney for the ICW-ICWA Texarkana Television Championship. On the following day at Son of The International Invasion of The International Invaders: Stage II, Jervis gained his first victory at Chikara in a tag team match, where he teamed with Shiima Xion to defeat the team of Adam Knight and Dr. Cheung.

=== Other promotions ===
Jervis has also competed in other promotions and has won several championships. On July 10, 2016, Jervis encountered the reigning Ironman Heavymetalweight Champion, Eli Drake, and started tickling Drake in front of a referee until Drake told the referee to make Jervis stop. As a result of this the referee counting Drake's request as a submission, Jervis was declared the new Ironman Heavymetalweight Champion. Later on that same day, Jervis surrendered the Ironman Heavymetalweight Championship to Joey Ryan when Ryan requested Jervis trade the championship for the two women that Ryan had with him.

On March 13, 2017, Cottonbelly acted as a marriage counselor to Laura James and her husband, Joey Ryan, who was the reigning WrestleCircus Sideshow Champion at the time. Due to the title having a "24/7" rule, Jervis asked Laura to put on a referee shirt for a counseling "exercise", and then tricked Ryan into saying "I submit" while giving him a hug, which resulted in Jervis winning the Sideshow Championship.

In a match that aired on April 16, 2021, from Championship Wrestling from Hollywood, Jervis challenged Levi Shapiro in a rematch from an earlier contest for Shapiro's Wrestling With Wregret YouTube Championship. The rematch saw Jervis pin Shapiro after he broke out of Shapiro's Iron Claw by tickling him, causing a distraction that enabled Jervis to score the victory. Jervis lost the title to Steve Migs at POW Pro Wrestling's Back From Beyond event on January 22, 2022.

== Championships and accomplishments ==
- Championship Wrestling from Hollywood
  - UWN Tag Team Championship (1 time) – with The Hobo
- Chikara
  - Challenge of the Immortals (2015) – with El Hijo del Ice Cream, Ice Cream Jr. and Princess KimberLee
- DDT Pro-Wrestling
  - Ironman Heavymetalweight Championship (1 time)
- Pro Wrestling Illustrated
  - Ranked No. 439 of the top 500 singles wrestlers in the PWI 500 in 2016
- WrestleCircus
  - WC Sideshow Championship (2 time, final)^{1}

^{1}Cottonbelly's second reign was as a member of the Squared Circle Subreddit.
