= Under the Hood =

2012 Chikara internet pay-per-view event

- Official logo, inspired by the opening screen of Mega Man X5
- Promotion: Chikara
- Date: December 2, 2012
- City: Philadelphia, Pennsylvania
- Venue: Trocadero Theatre
- Attendance: 525

Pay-per-view chronology
← Previous; Chikarasaurus Rex: How to Hatch a Dinosaur	Next → Aniversario: Never Compromise

Under the Hood was a professional wrestling internet pay-per-view (iPPV) event produced by the Chikara promotion, that took place on December 2, 2012 at the Trocadero Theatre in Philadelphia, Pennsylvania. The event marked Chikara's third iPPV, following November 2011's High Noon and June 2012's Chikarasaurus Rex: How to Hatch a Dinosaur. While the two previous iPPV's aired live through GoFightLive, Under the Hood instead aired through Smart Mark Video, Chikara's longtime DVD production and distribution partner. The event was headlined by Eddie Kingston defending the Chikara Grand Championship against the number one contender and 2012 Torneo Cibernetico winner Tim Donst. The event also saw The Young Bucks (Matt Jackson and Nick Jackson) defending the Chikara Campeonatos de Parejas against 1-2-3 Kid and Marty Jannetty and "Mr. Touchdown" Mark Angelosetti defending the Chikara Young Lions Cup against A. C. H., making Under the Hood the first ever Chikara event, where all three titles were defended. Other featured matches saw the culmination of two year-long storylines, with UltraMantis Black leading his Spectral Envoy stable to take on a team led by Delirious and a match where two teams, mixed of representatives of both Chikara and the villainous Gekido stable, battled each other. Under the Hood was Chikara's season eleven finale event. The event was attended by 525 fans and drew 1,025 buys online. The event was released on DVD and downloadable MP4 by Smart Mark Video on December 7, 2012.

== Background ==
Under the Hood featured eight professional wrestling matches involving different wrestlers from pre-existing scripted feuds, plots, and storylines that played out on Chikara's monthly house shows and on blog entries written on the promotion's official website. Wrestlers portray villains (rudos in Chikara) or heroes (tecnicos in Chikara) as they follow a series of events that build tension, and culminate in a wrestling match or series of matches. Chikara follows lucha libre traditions and is known for its colorful characters and gimmicks and family-friendly content.

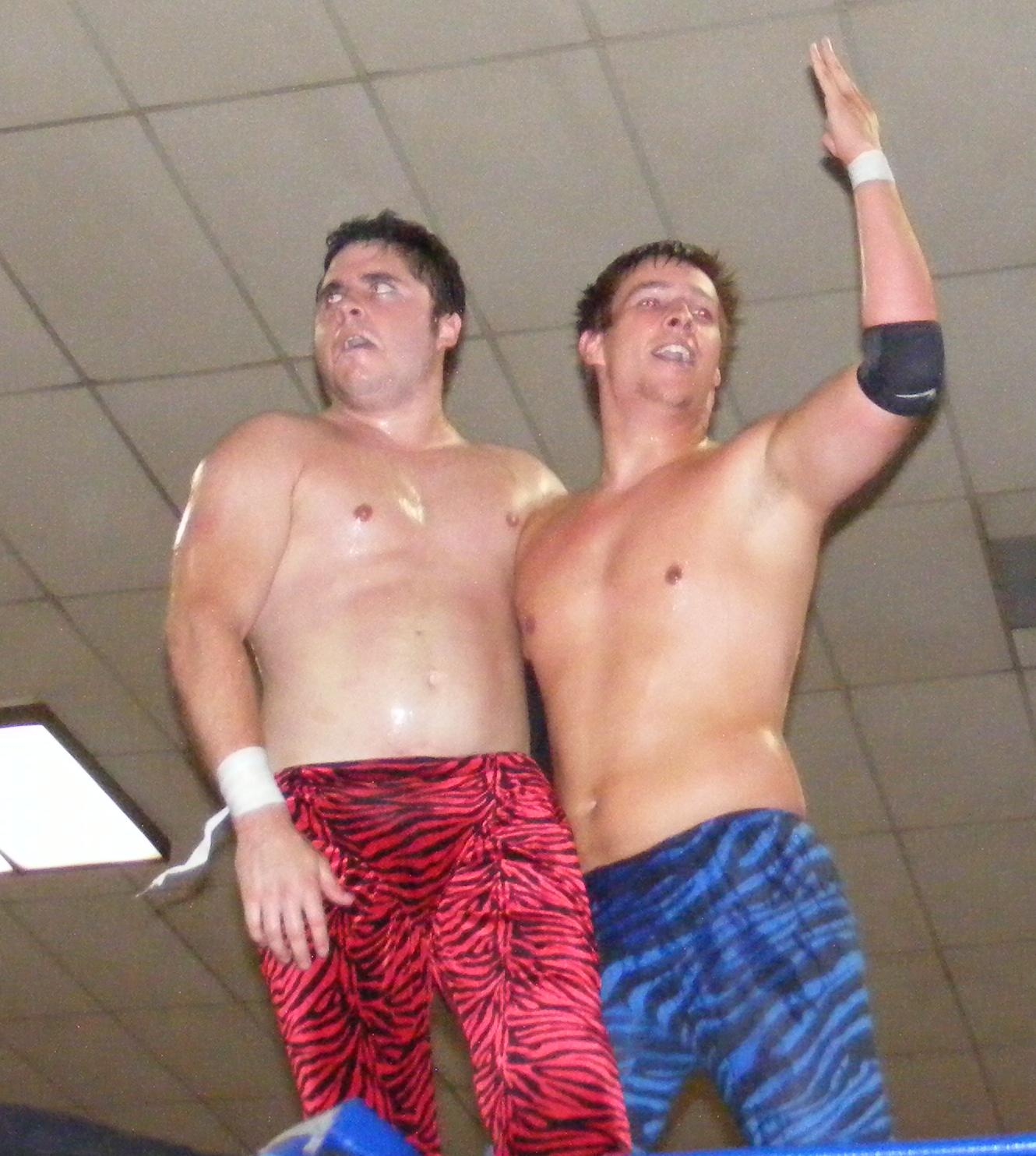
(Left to right) Shane Matthews and Scott "Jagged" Parker of 3.0

The first match for Under the Hood was announced on November 12, 2012, and saw two former Campeones de Parejas, 3.0 of Scott "Jagged" Parker and Shane Matthews and F.I.S.T. of Chuck Taylor and Johnny Gargano, face each other in a tag team match. In Chikara, teams need three points, or three back-to-back wins, in order to be eligible to challenge for the promotion's tag team championship, the Campeonatos de Parejas. Following the November 10 and 11 weekend, both teams have two points and the team that would win the match at Under the Hood would receive their third point and the next shot at the Campeonatos de Parejas. The two participating teams also had a history with each other; 3.0 won their only Campeonatos de Parejas from F.I.S.T. on March 24, 2012, though Icarus replaced an injured Gargano that night, only to lose it back to them on April 28, in the process making F.I.S.T. the only two-time Campeones de Parejas in Chikara history.

The second match announced for the iPPV saw "Mr. Touchdown" Mark Angelosetti defend the Chikara Young Lions Cup against A. C. H. Angelosetti won the Young Lions Cup on August 18, 2012, by defeating Chikara outsider ACH in a tournament final. After a three-month break from Chikara, ACH resurfaced on November 13 in a blog entry written on the promotion's official website, claiming that Angelosetti had stolen his moment the previous August and revealing that since then he had studied Angelosetti's matches, learning that he has "no respect for [his] peers, none for the fans, and most importantly [he does not] have respect for the prestige that is the Young Lions Cup". A rematch between the two was announced for Under the Hood the following day. Prior to the announcement, Angelosetti had been preoccupied with his storyline rivalry with The Mysterious and Handsome Stranger, the masked alter ego of Archibald Peck, who had been forced to leave Chikara after losing to Angelosetti at Chikarasaurus Rex: How to Hatch a Dinosaur. In a promo on Chikara's YouTube Event Center, The Stranger promised to attend Under the Hood in person. Under the Hood also featured the first crowning of Chikara's Homecoming King and Queen, with Angelosetti's valet Veronica being the only one to publicly ask for votes in the upcoming ballot.

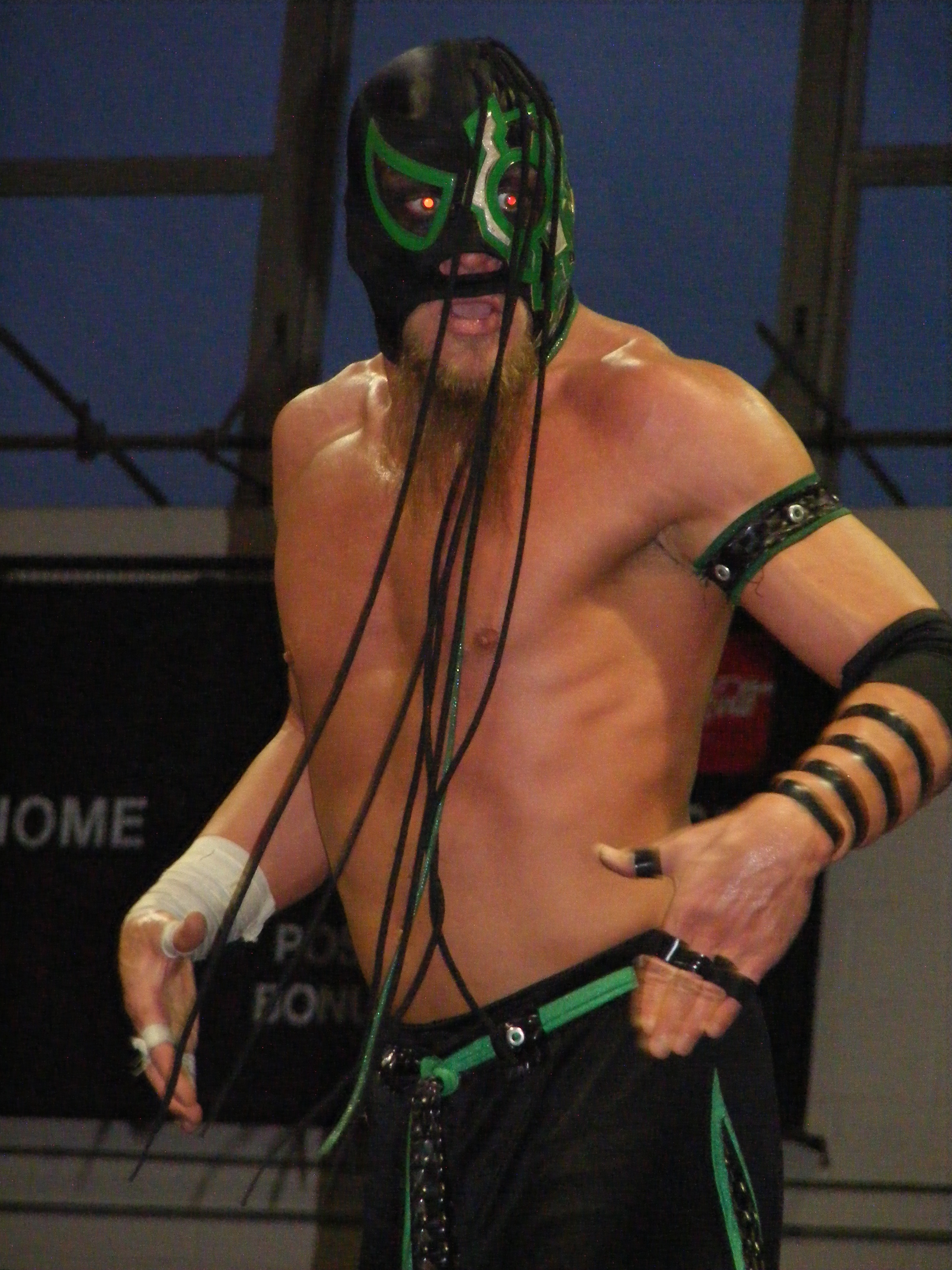
Delirious, whose storyline rivalry with UltraMantis Black was one of the focal points of Chikara's season eleven

The third match announced was a ten-man tag team match between The Spectral Envoy and the team of Delirious, Kobald, Kodama, Obariyon and Ophidian. The rivalry started back in February 2012, when Delirious returned to Chikara and vowed to make UltraMantis Black pay for the two years he lost while being held under the spell of the Eye of Tyr, first by UltraMantis and then by the Bruderschaft des Kreuzes. Though UltraMantis had long since turned tecnico and announced his intention of righting his past wrongs, Delirious was adamant about making him suffer for two entire years as punishment for the years he had lost. During the following months, Delirious aligned himself with Ophidian and The Batiri (Kobald, Kodama and Obariyon) in his rivalry with UltraMantis and his Spectral Envoy stable, which also included Frightmare and Hallowicked. Delirious' first goal was to prevent UltraMantis from winning the 2012 King of Trios tournament. The Spectral Envoy faced off with The Batiri in the quarter-finals of the tournament on September 15, which ended with UltraMantis pinning Obariyon for the win. Afterwards, Ophidian led The Batiri to a post-match assault on the victors. During the following day's final match between the Spectral Envoy and Team Ring of Honor (Mike Bennett, Matt Jackson and Nick Jackson), Delirious, Ophidian and The Batiri all came out to interfere, but were stopped by the returning Crossbones, UltraMantis Black's longtime associate. In the end, The Spectral Envoy managed to win the final match, realizing UltraMantis' dream of winning the King of Trios. Delirious later explained that his failure to stop the Spectral Envoy was karmic justice caused by his past sins, but now it was time for UltraMantis to face the same justice. The rivalry between the two groups continued on November 10, when Ophidian and The Batiri cost UltraMantis and Hallowicked their match with The Young Bucks (Matt Jackson and Nick Jackson) for the Campeonatos de Parejas. Six days later, Chikara announced the "War to Settle the Score" between the two groups. Originally it was announced that for the match, the Spectral Envoy would be represented by UltraMantis Black, Frightmare, Hallowicked and two unnamed members to be revealed later. On November 20, Crossbones was revealed as the first of the two surprise participants. On November 27, Blind Rage was revealed as the final member of the Spectral Envoy. Rage is a Chikara original, who was trained at the Chikara Wrestle Factory and wrestled on the promotion's first ever event on May 25, 2002, as a representative of the rudo stable Night Shift with Hallowicked and Ichabod Slayne (later renamed Icarus). He also teamed with Hallowicked and UltraMantis Black in 2005 as the Dark Breed, and on November 18, 2006, made a one night return as a member of UltraMantis Black's the Order of the Neo-Solar Temple, which turned out to be his final Chikara appearance in over six years.

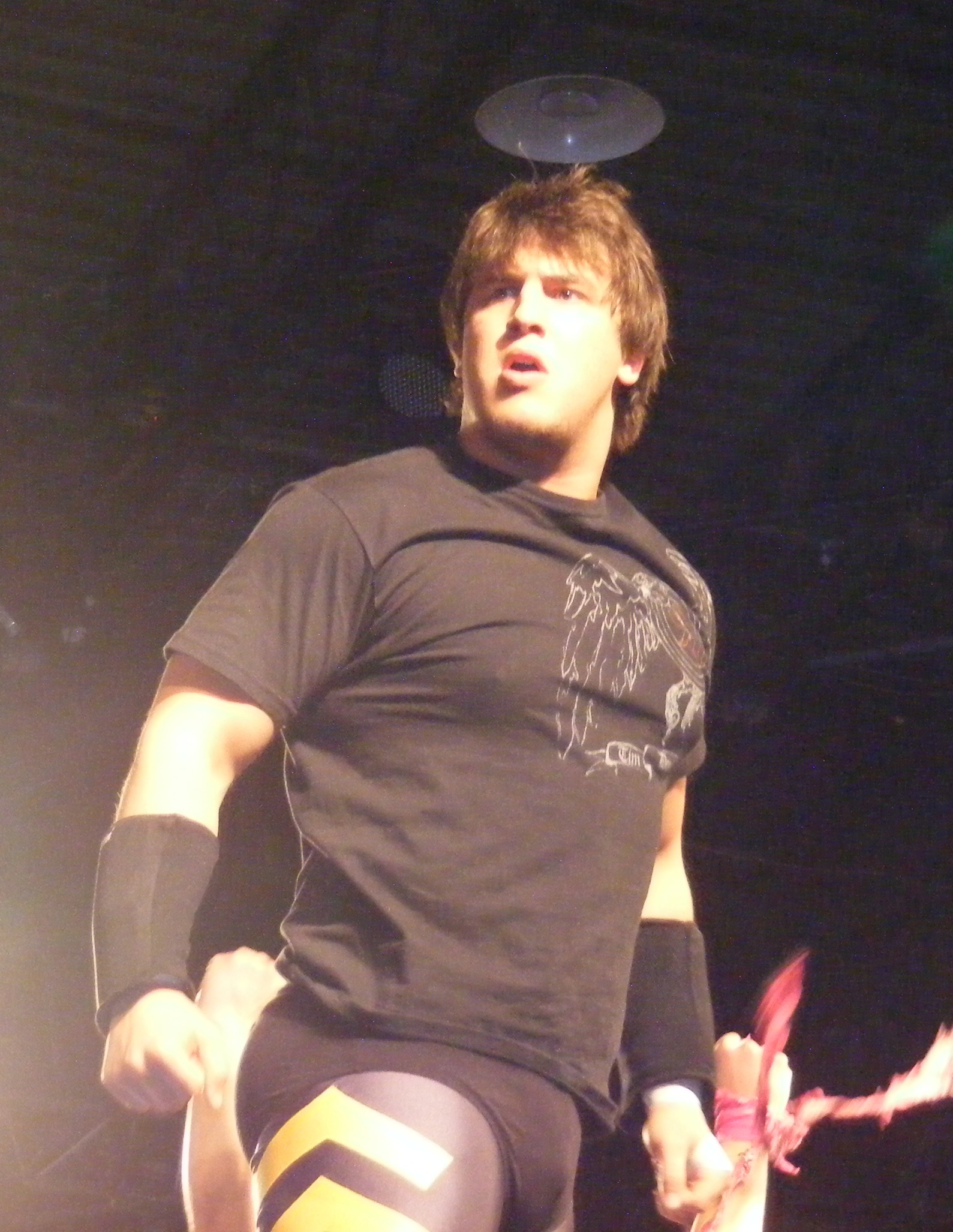
Tim Donst, the number one contender to the Chikara Grand Championship heading into Under the Hood

At Under the Hood, Eddie Kingston was set to make his eighth defense of the Chikara Grand Championship against number one contender, Tim Donst. The rivalry between the two started on September 15, 2012, when Donst attacked Kingston, after he had successfully defended his title for the seventh time against Osaka Pro Wrestling representative Tadasuke. Since losing his hair to Hallowicked at Chikarasaurus Rex: How to Hatch a Dinosaur, Donst blamed all of his misfortunes on the Young Lions Cup, claiming it had made him a "loser" without a purpose or a "grand plan". Donst even went as far as preventing his tag team partner Jakob Hammermeier from winning the tenth Young Lions Cup tournament. After finding his purpose, the Grand Championship, Donst began abusing Hammermeier as a way of sending a message to Kingston, and even though the two had gathered two points together, refused to team with him again and go for their third point, instead proclaiming himself a singles wrestler and the Chikara Grand Championship his goal. On November 18, Kingston and Donst formed an uneasy alliance to take on a team led by Ring of Honor's Kevin Steen in the ninth annual sixteen-man torneo cibernetico. After Team Kingston had managed to eliminate the entire Team Steen, its members had to face each other as there could only be one winner. In the end, Donst pinned Kingston for the win and afterwards tied him up with help from Hammermeier, before laying down a challenge for a Grand Championship match at Under the Hood. The championship match was made official the following day. This marked the first time the title would be defended on iPPV.

Under the Hood also saw the reigning Campeones de Parejas, The Young Bucks, make their third defense of the title against the team of 1-2-3 Kid and Marty Jannetty. Waltman, working under his old World Wrestling Federation (WWF) ring name "1-2-3 Kid", returned to Chikara on November 14, 2012, after a year-long break to take part in the 2012 King of Trios tournament. After his team was eliminated from the tournament in the first round, the 1-2-3 Kid returned two days later, entering the annual tag team gauntlet match alongside Marty Jannetty, with whom he held the WWF World Tag Team Championship in 1994. Jannetty had made his Chikara debut at High Noon, accompanying his trainees, The Young Bucks, to their match, which was followed by his in-ring debut for the promotion on August 12, 2012. 1-2-3 Kid and Jannetty ended up scoring the last two eliminations of the match over The Powers of Pain (The Barbarian and The Warlord) and Los Ice Creams (El Hijo del Ice Cream and Ice Cream Jr.), earning two points in the process. 1-2-3 Kid and Jannetty returned to Chikara on November 18, when they defeated the Heart Throbs (Antonio Thomas and Romeo Roselli) in a tag team match to earn their third point and the right to challenge for the Campeonatos de Parejas. The title match between them and The Young Bucks was officially announced on November 21. This made Under the Hood Chikara's first ever event, where all three of the promotion's titles were defended.

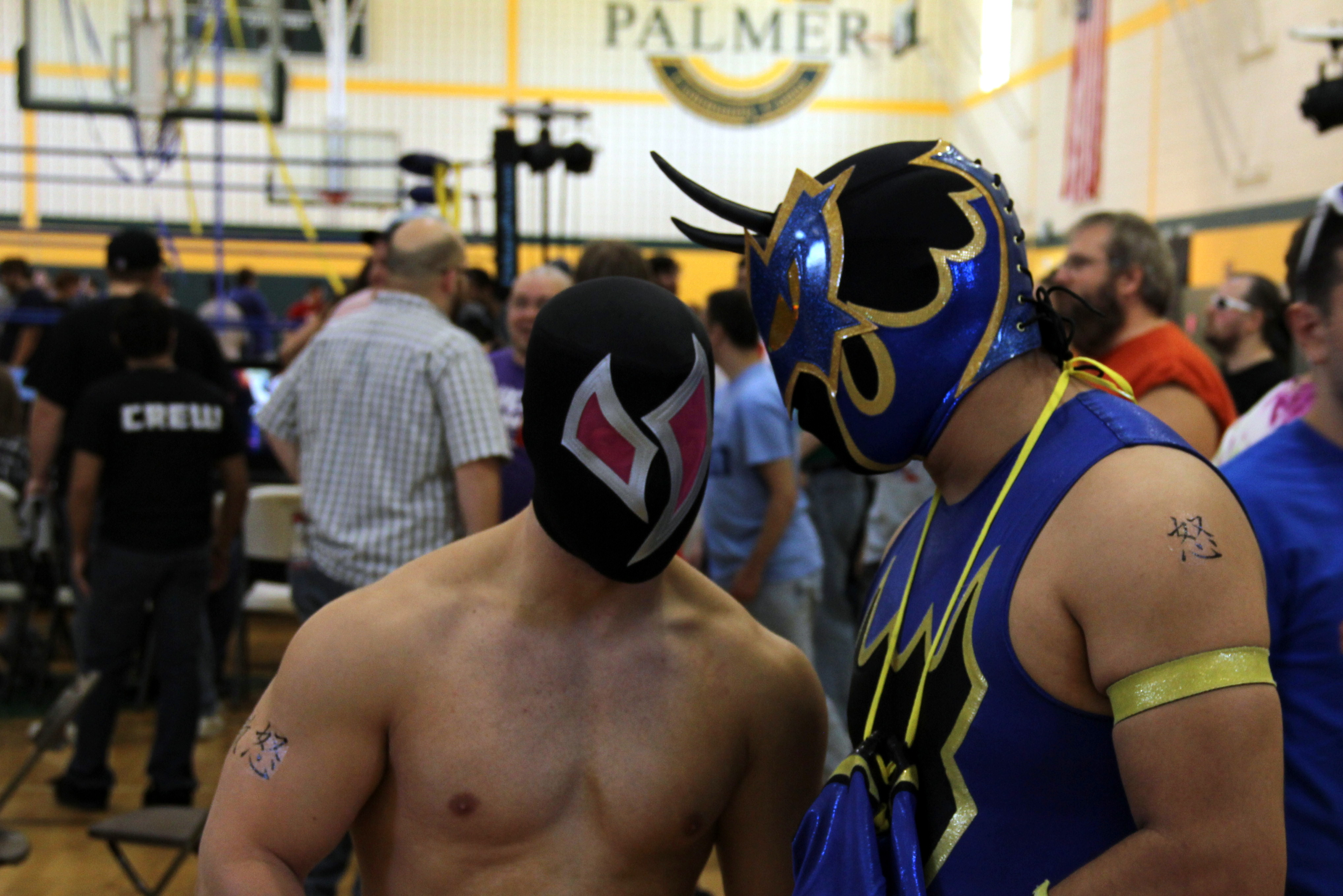
(Left to right) The Shard and assailAnt of Gekido, Chikara's top rudo stable of 2012

The sixth match announced for the iPPV involved Chikara's main storyline of 2012, the rudo stable Gekido and its war with the promotion. Following Chikarasaurus Rex: How to Hatch a Dinosaur, where Chikara's top wrestlers came together to defeat Gekido in an eight-man tag team match, the rudo stable went on a losing streak without their leader 17, who had been, in storyline, injured by Chikara founder Mike Quackenbush. 17 returned to the ring with Quackenbush on August 18, when he and stablemate The Shard faced Quackenbush and his longtime tag team partner Jigsaw in a tag team match. During the match, Quackenbush once again showed his new mean streak, which he had debuted at Chikarasaurus Rex and which eventually led to him being disqualified for excessive punishment, after hitting 17 with all four versions of his Quackendriver finisher. This was used as a storyline reason for writing 17 out of Chikara. Quackenbush vowed to also eliminate the other four members of Gekido; assailAnt, combatAnt, deviAnt and The Shard, from Chikara, much to the dismay of Jigsaw, who thought Quackenbush was reckless and should just stay focused on winning matches.

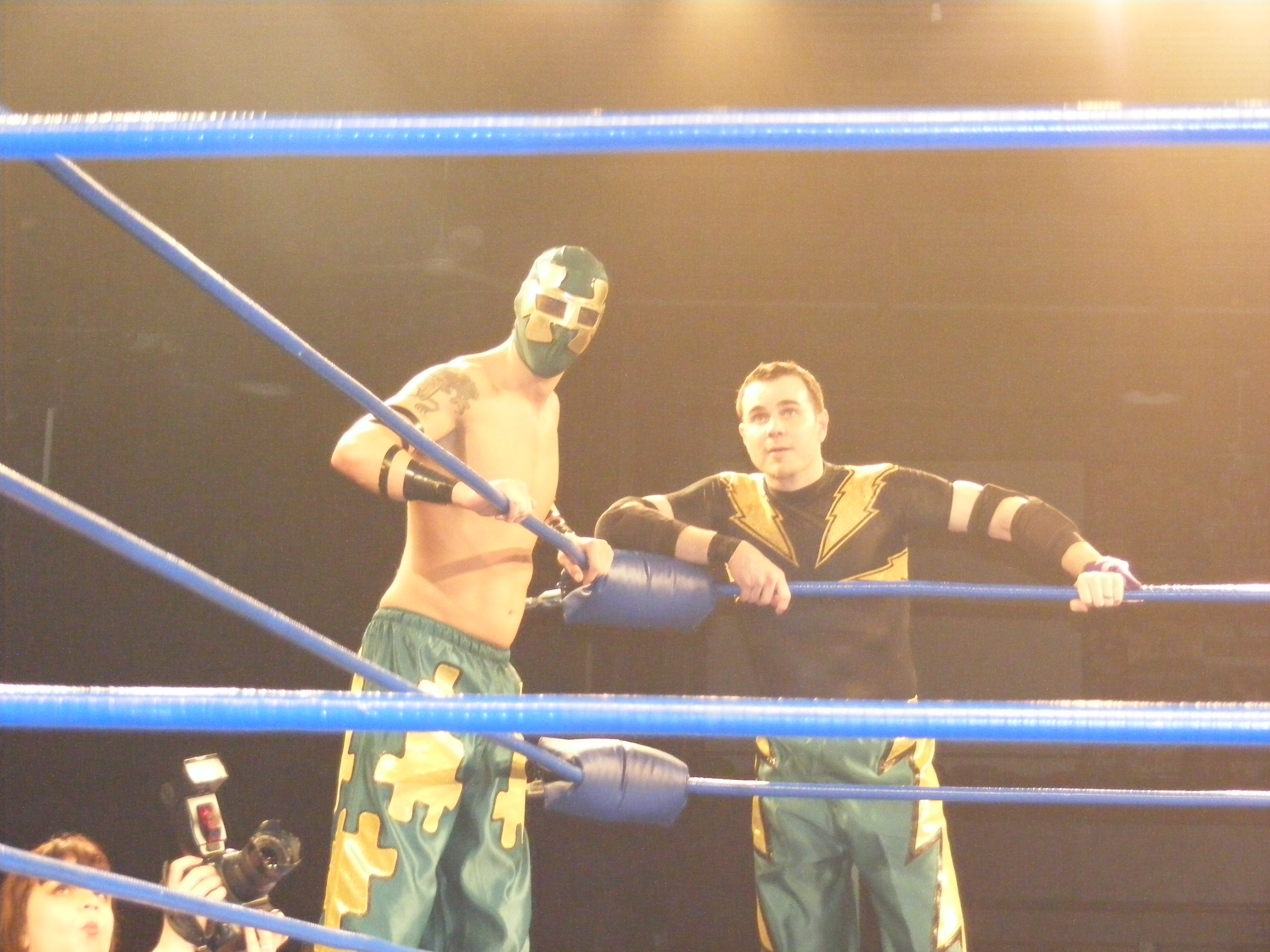
(Left to right) Jigsaw and Mike Quackenbush, who won the Chikara Campeonatos de Parejas in December 2010, broke up in November 2012 over Quackenbush's treatment of Gekido

Meanwhile, while Fire Ant had, in storyline, been injured by Gekido during the Chikarasaurus Rex preshow, Chikara's Director of Fun Wink Vavasseur moved Chikara tecnico Soldier Ant over to Gekido and its subgroup The Swarm, thinking him, combatAnt and deviAnt would make the strongest trio of ants for the 2012 King of Trios. However, when Fire Ant was able to return in time for the tournament, Vavasseur refused to go back on his move and instead moved assailAnt over to The Colony to replace Soldier Ant. During the 2012 King of Trios, both The Colony, represented by Fire Ant, Green Ant and assailAnt, and The Swarm, represented by combatAnt, deviAnt and Soldier Ant, were eliminated during the first round. After Quackenbush, Jigsaw and Manami Toyota had eliminated The Swarm, Quackenbush attacked combatAnt, eliminating also him from Chikara and once again infuriating Jigsaw. Following King of Trios, the mixed Colony and Gekido teams remained booked together, despite pleas made to the Director of Fun by Green Ant. Next Quackenbush announced that he had set his sights on both deviAnt and The Shard. On November 18, Quackenbush went to attack The Shard after his match with Fire Ant, but was stopped by Jigsaw coming out and turning on him with a superkick. Jigsaw then left the arena with The Shard, who had arrived in Chikara in February 2012 supposedly as Jigsaw's rudo equivalent, having been trained alongside him. On November 23, Chikara announced that at Under the Hood, Quackenbush would team with Fire Ant, Green Ant and assailAnt in an eight-man tag team match, where they would take on deviAnt, Jigsaw, The Shard and Soldier Ant. On November 29, Jigsaw explained his actions in a blog entry on Chikara's official website, claiming that while Quackenbush only saw someone that "[needed] to be taught a lesson", he had always seen the potential in The Shard, who was only lacking in direction. With 17 and his agenda gone from Gekido, Jigsaw explained that he was going to take The Shard under his wing and aim him in a different direction. Quackenbush responded two days later, admitting that The Shard did have potential, but made his decision in 2002 by turning down an offer to join Jigsaw, BlackJack Marciano, Eddie Kingston and Jolly Roger when they left Independent Wrestling Federation (IWF) to join the Chikara Wrestle Factory. Then years later, when The Shard realized his mistake, he took a shortcut and decided to steal a spot on the promotion's roster from other hard working wrestlers. Quackenbush also noted that he had not forgotten how Gekido had injured him and Fire Ant and ended the careers of Dragonfly and Tianlong and pleaded Jigsaw to rethink his decision.

The seventh match announced saw Dasher Hatfield take on Icarus in a singles match. The rivalry between the two started on November 17, 2012, at a "free-per-view" presented by Chikara's sister promotion Wrestling is Fun! (WiF!), which Smart Mark Video used to test out its new iPPV format. After being defeated by Hatfield in a singles match at the event, Icarus attacked the victor and hit him with his Wings of Icarus finishing maneuver. Hatfield and Icarus had a rematch at a Chikara event the following day, where Hatfield again was victorious, after which he was once again hit with the Wings of Icarus. On November 26, a third singles match between the two was announced for Under the Hood. Another point of interest for the match was Sugar Dunkerton, the former Throwbacks partner of Hatfield, who was forced to join F.I.S.T., after asking Wink Vavasseur for a spot in one of Chikara's stables. During the past months, Dunkerton had had an uneasy relationship with his new stablemates, who had dubbed him their "water boy", refusing to acknowledge him as their equal.

== Event ==
Other on-screen personnel
Role:	Name:
Commentators	Bryce Remsburg
Commentators	Gavin Loudspeaker
Commentators	Leonard F. Chikarason
Commentators	Wink Vavasseur
Ring announcers	Gavin Loudspeaker
Referees	Bryce Remsburg
Referees	Daniel Yost
Referees	Jonathan Barber

=== Preliminary matches ===
The pay-per-view kicked off with a match between 3.0 (Scott Parker and Shane Matthews) and F.I.S.T. to determine who would get to challenge for the Chikara Campeonatos de Parejas in early 2013. In the end, 3.0 won the match with their double-team finishing maneuver, Sweet Taste o' Professionalism, to earn their third point and send F.I.S.T. back down to zero points.

In the second match, Dasher Hatfield took on Icarus, who was accompanied to the ring by Sugar Dunkerton. During the match, Dunkerton was siding with his former Throwbacks partner, Hatfield, including putting his foot on the ring ropes to break a pinfall, after Icarus had dropped him onto a guardrail with the Blu-Ray. Icarus then tried to throw powder into Hatfield's face, but got the referee of the match instead. Hatfield then hit Icarus with his finishing maneuver, the Suicide Squeeze, but the referee was unable to make the count. While Hatfield was checking on the referee, Icarus grabbed his weapon of choice, his fanny pack, but was prevented from using it by Dunkerton. Icarus then pushed Dunkerton into Hatfield and followed that up by dropping his opponent with the Wings of Icarus for the win. Afterwards, Dunkerton tried to check on Hatfield, but was grabbed into a hug by Icarus, who then dragged him out of the ring.

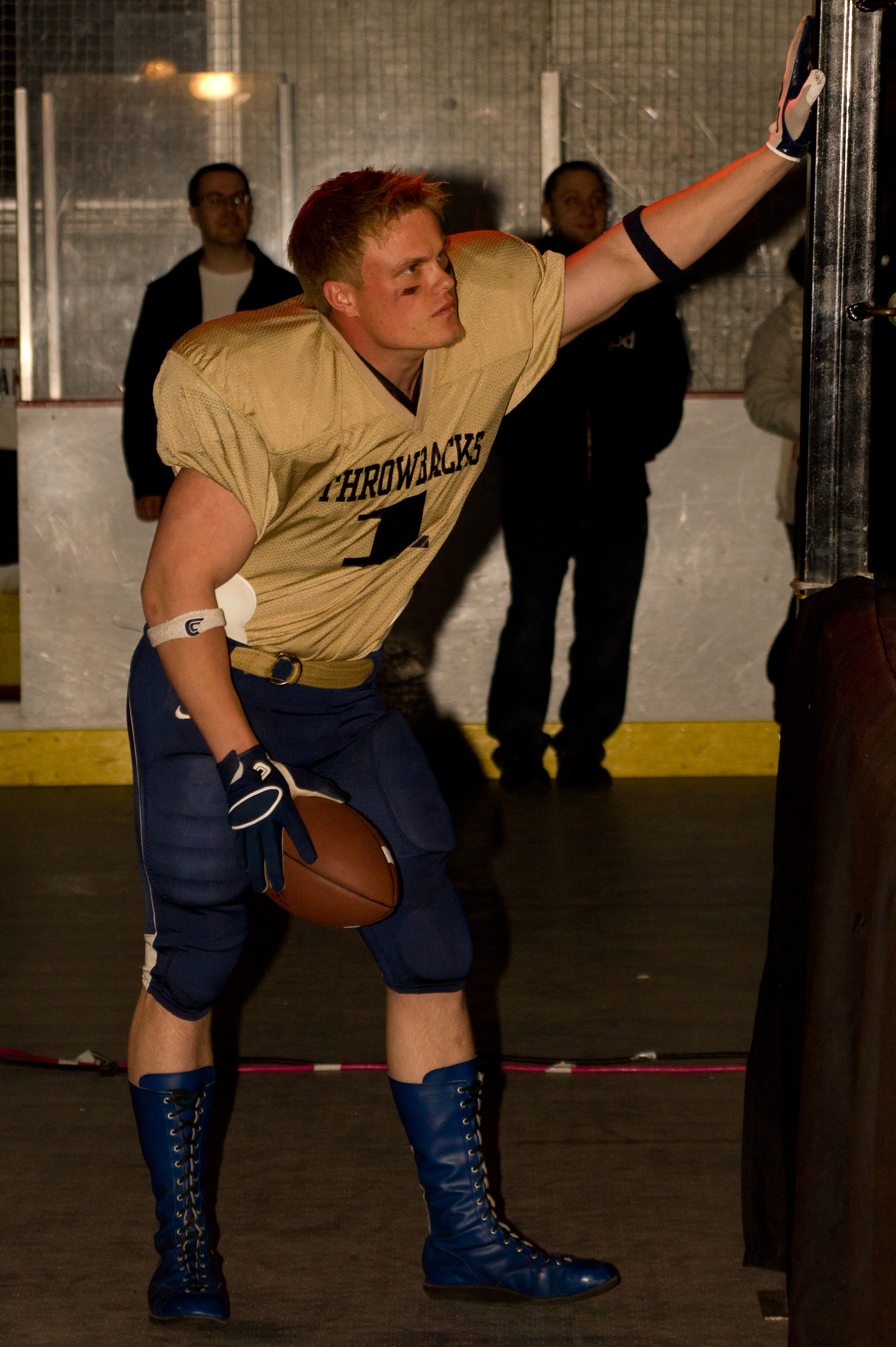
"Mr. Touchdown" Mark Angelosetti, who successfully defended the Chikara Young Lions Cup at Under the Hood

In the third match of the iPPV, assailAnt, Fire Ant, Green Ant and Mike Quackenbush took on deviAnt, Jigsaw, The Shard and Soldier Ant. During the match, assailAnt worked together with the Chikara tecnicos and Jigsaw with the Gekido rudos, unlike Soldier Ant who did not get along with his partners for the match. During the match, Quackenbush also hesitated from hitting Jigsaw with a palm strike, which Jigsaw used to his advantage, attacking his former partner. Jigsaw then went for a superkick on Quackenbush, but instead hit assailAnt, who dove in front of the move. As Jigsaw went for another, Quackenbush grabbed his foot and hit him with the palm strike. deviAnt then pulled Quackenbush out of the ring, after which The Shard hit his former Gekido partner assailAnt with a diving double foot stomp, but Quackenbush was able to make it back to the ring to break up the following pinfall. deviAnt then followed Quackenbush to the ring and dropkicked him to the outside, before pinning assailAnt, still down from the double foot stomp, to win the match for Gekido. After the match, deviAnt, Jigsaw and The Shard all left the ringside area together. Quackenbush, Fire Ant and Green Ant all accepted assailAnt as part of Chikara and The Colony and left backstage, leaving Soldier Ant behind.

In the final match before the intermission, "Mr. Touchdown" Mark Angelosetti defended the Young Lions Cup against ACH. In the end, Angelosetti's valet Veronica turned out to be the deciding factor, when Angelosetti grabbed a hold of her baton to pin ACH and retain the cup. After the match, Chikara announced the winners of the Homecoming King and Queen polls. Veronica was announced as the winner of the Queen poll, but to the surprise of both her and Angelosetti, The Mysterious and Handsome Stranger was announced as the winner of the King poll. After The Stranger had taken Angelosetti out of the ring, he and Veronica had their first dance as the Homecoming King and Queen of Chikara. Veronica then went to remove The Stranger's mask for a kiss, but he instead told her to close her eyes. He then went outside the ring and grabbed a bucket of pig slop from under the ring, which he then proceeded to dump over Veronica. The Stranger then removed his mask to reveal Archibald Peck, supposedly, to the shock of both the announcers and the fans in attendance. The segment ended with Peck being escorted out of the arena by security guards.

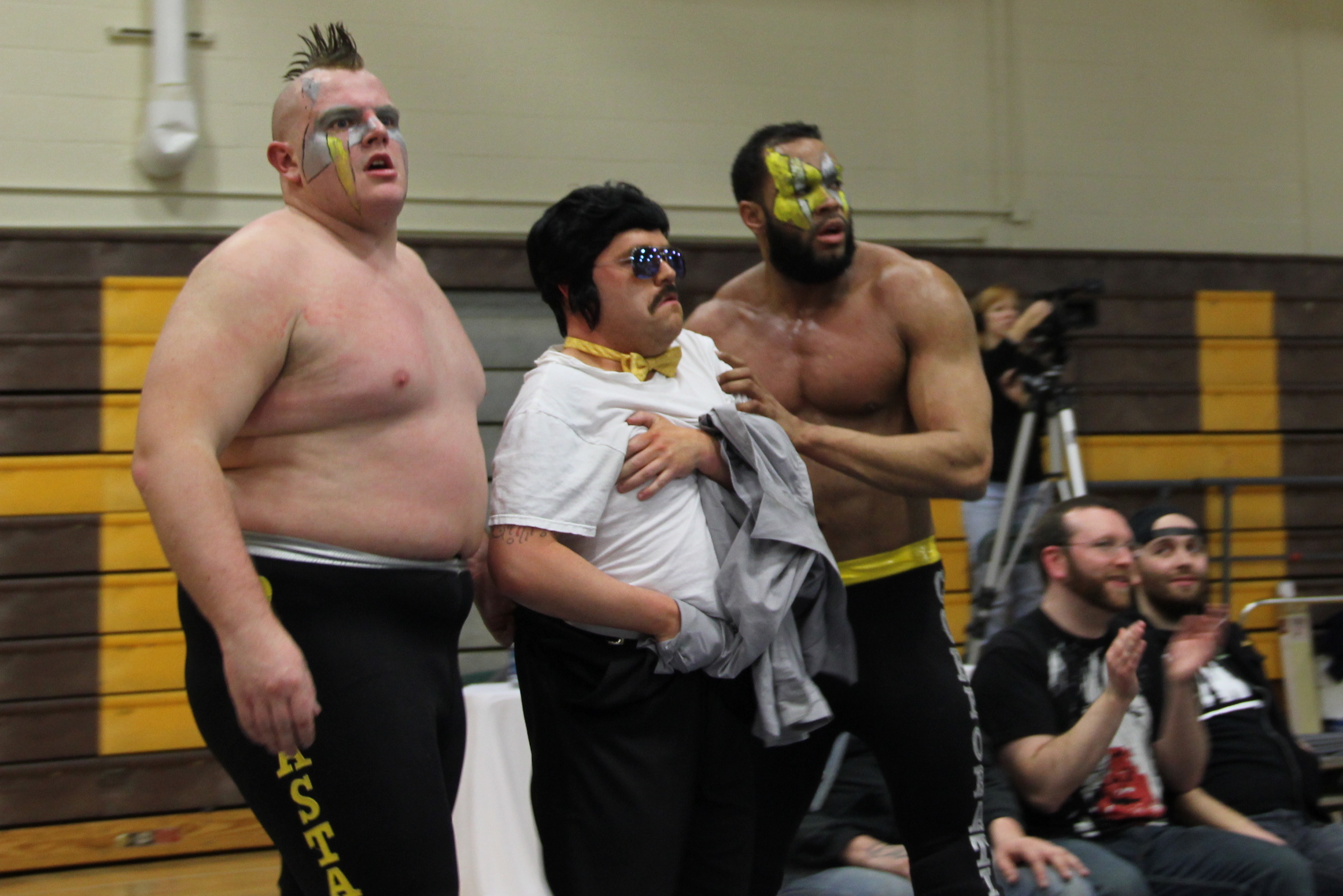
(Left to right) Max Smashmaster, Sidney Bakabella and Blaster McMassive, who made their iPPV debuts at Under the Hood

After the intermission, Chikara presented an unadvertised match, as Sidney Bakabella led Blaster McMassive and Max Smashmaster of the Devastation Corporation to the ring. The men, who had made their debuts in August 2012, were also accompanied by a new third unnamed wrestler. Bakabella announced that his team had two points and that he had found wrestlers from Mexico, who had agreed to take on them in a match. This led to the entrance of El Hijo del Ice Cream and Ice Cream Jr. of Los Ice Creams, who were defeated in quick fashion with the Death Blow double-team finishing maneuver. As a result, The Devastation Corporation now had three points and a future shot at the Campeonatos de Parejas.

=== Main event matches ===
The sixth match of the pay-per-view saw Delirious, Kobald, Kodama, Obariyon and Ophidian take on the Spectral Envoy, represented by leader UltraMantis Black, Blind Rage, Crossbones, Frightmare and Hallowicked, in a ten-man tag team match. During the match, several fans appeared ringside wearing masks of Amasis, the retired former partner of Ophidian, on whom he had turned at High Noon. Eventually, one of the fans was revealed as the actual Amasis, distracting Ophidian and allowing UltraMantis Black, who had been dominated the early part of the match, to make a hot tag. At the end of match, after all other participants had left the ring, UltraMantis Black was left in the ring with his rival, Delirious. After surviving both the Shadows Over Heck and the Praying Mantis Bomb, UltraMantis managed to pin Delirious for the win with the Cosmic Doom.

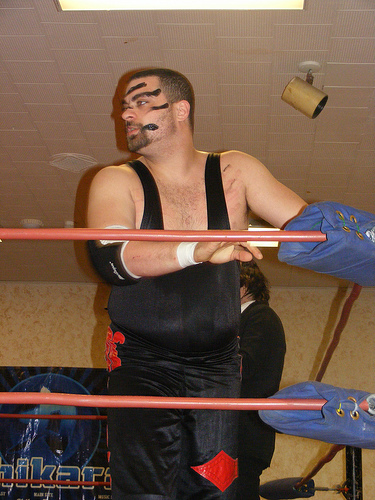
Eddie Kingston, who made his eighth successful defense of the Chikara Grand Championship at Under the Hood

In the seventh match of the event, The Young Bucks of Matt and Nick Jackson defended the Chikara Campeonatos de Parejas against the 1-2-3 Kid and Marty Jannetty. As with all tag team title matches in Chikara, the match was contested under two out of three falls rules. The defending champions won the first fall, pinning 1-2-3 Kid after a spike tombstone piledriver. Later, 1-2-3 Kid tied the match by pinning Nick with the X-Factor. The Young Bucks won the third and final fall of the match by pinning 1-2-3 Kid with the More Bang for Your Buck to make their third successful defense of the Campeonatos de Parejas.

The main event of the evening featured Eddie Kingston defending the Chikara Grand Championship against Tim Donst, who was accompanied to the match by Jakob Hammermeier. During the match, Donst continued abusing Hammermeier, who despite this kept trying to interfere in the match on his behalf. Towards the end of the match, referee Bryce Remsburg was in storyline knocked unconscious, after Donst pulled him in front of an attack by Kingston. After some hesitation, Hammermeier finally agreed to give Donst his loaded bag, which he then hit Kingston in the head with. However, the defending champion managed to kick out of the following pinfall. Donst then went back to abusing Hammermeier, giving both Kingston and the referee time to recover. Kingston then hit Donst with two Backfists to the Future and pinned him to win the match and retain the Grand Championship. After the match, Kingston grabbed Hammermeier, while Donst left the arena, refusing to help his partner. Hammermeier surrendered himself to Kingston, ready to take what he deserved, but eventually Kingston agreed to let him go.

The pay-per-view ended with two vignettes. In the first, two men in hazmat suits were on location at the cave, where Delirious had destroyed the Eye of Tyr, after receiving it from UltraMantis Black at the start of the year. A voice could then be heard asking if they had "it". In the second vignette, Wink Vavasseur was approached by his father, who told him to "stop screwing up".

== Reception ==
411Mania's Kevin Ford gave Under the Hood a score of 7.5 out of 10, writing that "the first half of this show was awesome. All the matches were really good and the Archibald Peck reveal was very entertaining. After intermission though things fell apart". Ford gave the highest individual score of three and three quarter stars out of five to the match between Mark Angelosetti and ACH. Pro Wrestling Torch correspondent Chris Davidson wrote in his review of the event that "this was a pretty good card, and successfully ended the major storylines of Season 11, while still leaving room to expound on them in Season 12".

== Aftermath ==
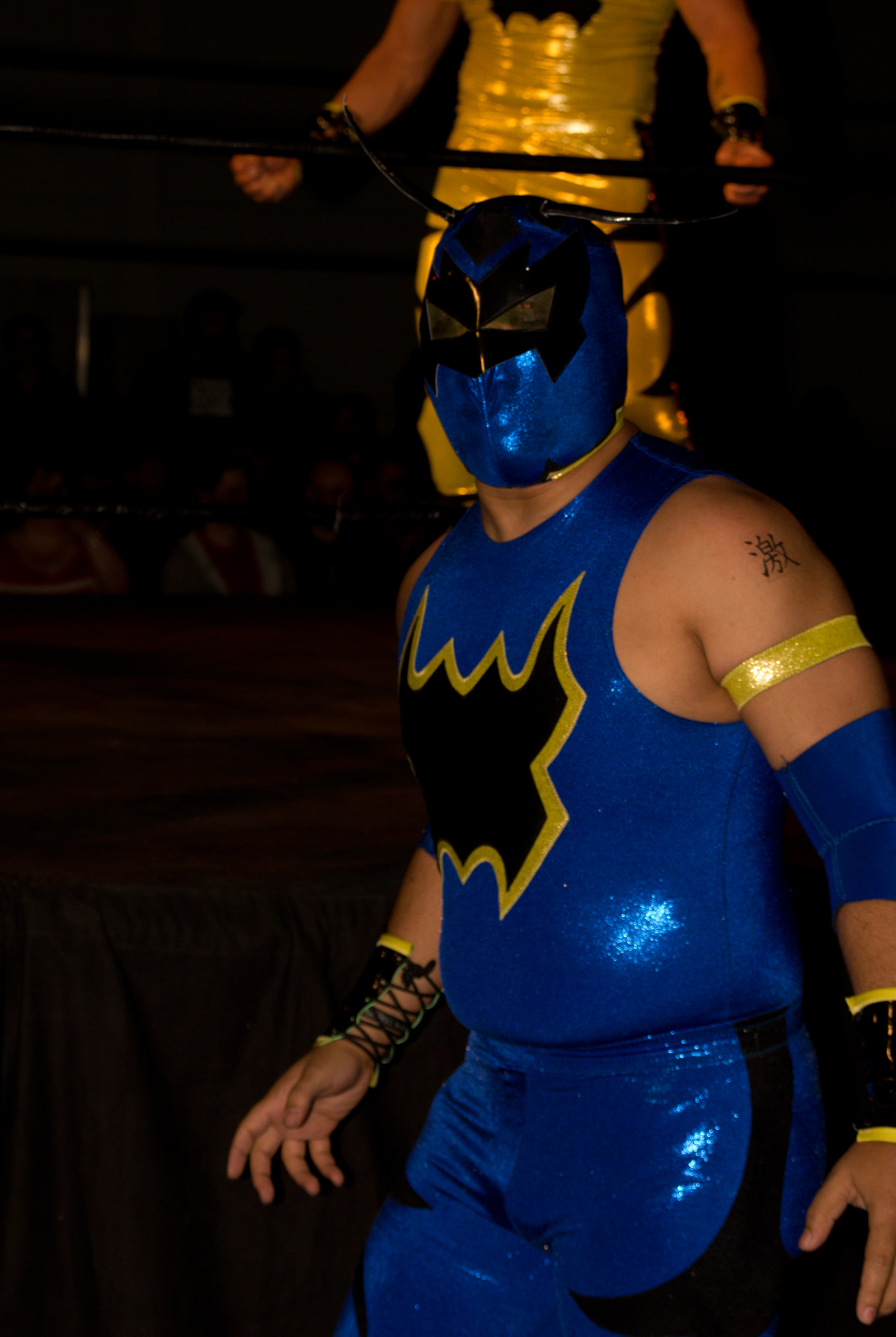
assailAnt, who completed his tecnico turn at Under the Hood and became a full-fledged member of The Colony following the event

Before the premiere of season twelve, Archibald Peck was reinstated in Chikara. In storyline, Chikara's Director of Fun Wink Vavasseur allowed Peck to return, after Peck's barrister R.D. Evans, another character portrayed by Robert Evans, managed to convince him that backstage at Chikarasaurus rex: How to Hatch a Dinosaur, Peck had been hit with Eddie Kingston's Backfist to the Future, which had in fact sent him back in time to 1885. From 1885 Peck was eventually sent forward to a time, when the Chikara event had already concluded, meaning that the Archibald Peck, who had been pinned at Chikarasaurus Rex and forced to leave the promotion, was not the real Peck, who instead returned as The Mysterious and Handsome Stranger. Peck and Mark Angelosetti finished their rivalry on February 9, 2013, in a No Disqualification match, where Peck was victorious. Afterwards, Veronica left Angelosetti and aligned herself with Tim Donst, continuing her rivalry against Peck with her new managee. Donst meanwhile adopted a new depressed, "Raven-like" persona following the loss at Under the Hood, retaining Jakob Hammermeier as his loyal follower, while also recruiting Steve "The Turtle" Weiner as part of his new stable.

Out of the two teams that earned their third point at Under the Hood, 3.0 was the first to receive their shot at the Campeonatos de Parejas, when it was announced that they would challenge The Young Bucks for the title on February 10, 2013, in Easton, Pennsylvania. 3.0 went on to win the match two falls to one to become the new Campeones de Parejas. The Devastation Corporation, which also earned their third point at Under the Hood, received its title opportunity on March 8, but was defeated by 3.0 two falls to one.

Following Under the Hood, assailAnt became a full-fledged member of The Colony. Meanwhile, Soldier Ant, having seemingly been abandoned by his former stablemates and describing himself as a "Prisoner of War" in The Swarm, was put in a position of leadership by Wink Vavasseur, when, on March 8, 2013, he debuted three new ants; Arctic Rescue Ant, Missile Assault Ant and Orbit Adventure Ant, forming "The Colony: Xtreme Force", starting a rivalry between them and The Colony. After deeming The Colony: Xtreme Force the top ants in Chikara, Vavasseur stripped Fire Ant, Green Ant and Soldier Ant of their King of Trios medals and awarded them to the new ants.

== Results ==
No.	Results	Stipulations	Times
1	3.0 (Scott Parker and Shane Matthews) defeated F.I.S.T. (Chuck Taylor and Johnny Gargano)	Tag team match	13:09
2	Icarus (with Sugar Dunkerton) defeated Dasher Hatfield	Singles match	11:04
3	deviAnt, Jigsaw, The Shard and Soldier Ant defeated assailAnt, Fire Ant, Green Ant and Mike Quackenbush	Eight-man tag team match	16:49
4	Mark Angelosetti (c) (with Veronica) defeated A. C. H.	Singles match for the Chikara Young Lions Cup	15:50
5	The Devastation Corporation (Blaster McMassive and Max Smashmaster) (with Sidney Bakabella) defeated Los Ice Creams (El Hijo del Ice Cream and Ice Cream Jr.)	Tag team match	01:42
6	The Spectral Envoy (Blind Rage, Crossbones, Frightmare, Hallowicked, UltraMantis Black) defeated Delirious, Kobald, Kodama, Obariyon and Ophidian	Ten-man tag team match	23:27
7	The Young Bucks (Matt Jackson and Nick Jackson) (c) defeated 1-2-3 Kid and Marty Jannetty	Two out of three falls tag team match for the Chikara Campeonatos de Parejas	23:28
8	Eddie Kingston (c) defeated Tim Donst (with Jakob Hammermeier)	Singles match for the Chikara Grand Championship	20:01
(c) / – the champion(s) heading into the match
