= Ophidian (wrestler) =

American professional wrestler

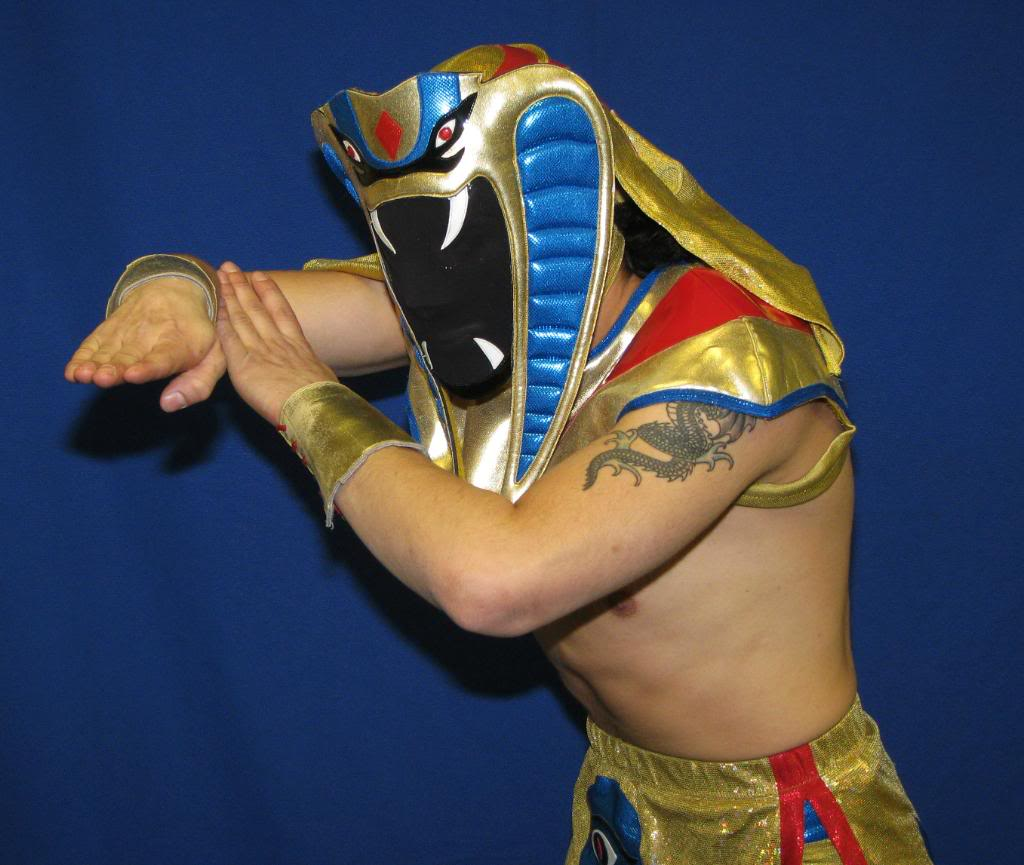
- Ophidian in a 2010 promo photo

Professional wrestling career
- Ring name(s): Ophidian; Ouroboros
- Billed height: 5 ft 8 in (1.73 m)
- Billed weight: 165 lb (75 kg)
- Billed from: The Nile River Bed
- Trained by: Mike Quackenbush; Chris Hero
- Debut: May 6, 2007
- Retired: June 29, 2020

Ophidian is a retired professional wrestler best known for performing with Chikara. He was previously a member of The Osirian Portal stable along with his former partners Amasis and Hieracon. His gimmick is an anthropomorphic Egyptian cobra, which is reflected in his in-ring gear and cobra head mask as well as his mannerisms and speech. Ophidian served as an assistant trainer at The Wrestle Factory, operated by Chikara founder Mike Quackenbush.

== Professional wrestling career ==
Ophidian trained at the Chikara Wrestle Factory wrestling school. Upon graduation he began teaming with Amasis and the pair adopted their gimmick and their masks to become The Osirian Portal, a team inspired by ancient Egyptian culture. Ophidian became an anthropomorphic King Cobra while Amasis became a break dancing pharaoh. Part of their gimmick involved hypnosis, wherein Amasis would hold Ophidian in a wheelbarrow hold, while the latter places his hands together and waves them in front of their opponents, hypnotizing them.

=== Chikara ===
==== The Osirian Portal (2007–2011) ====
Amasis and Ophidian made their debut as a tag team on September 22, 2007, at the Chikara show Cibernetico and Robin, defeating ShaneSaw (Shane Storm and Jigsaw) in their first match together. Ophidian had made his debut on June 5 at an XCW Wrestling Mid-West event and had wrestled two matches on his own in Chikara, on July 4 and 21, while for Amasis this was his professional wrestling debut. In early 2008 Amasis and Ophidian entered the King of Trios tournament along with Mecha Mummy forming Team Egypt. Since that time they tag teamed through 2007 until Amasis retired in September 2011 due to a non-wrestling injury, Ophidian turned on Amasis thus ending the Osirian Portal and turning Ophidian into a Rudo (heel).

==== Rudo turn and singles competition (2011–2020) ====
Ophidian began using a new look at Chikara shows for the eleventh season, switching to a red snake mask instead of a cobra's head at Chikarasaurus Rex: How to Hatch a Dinosaur. Throughout the eleventh season he also began allying himself with The Batiri and Delirious.

On October 31, Ophidian released a hip-hop song, Death To Amasis, about the breakup and "death" of former partner Amasis. Also included were various instrumentals.

Amasis returned to Chikara on December 2, 2012, at Under the Hood, starting a rivalry with Ophidian. The two faced off on June 2, 2013, at Aniversario: Never Compromise, where Amasis defeated Ophidian in a Sarcophagus match. Afterwards, Ophidian and Amasis reunited at a Wrestling is Cool event and once again began teaming together.

In 2017, Ophidian was defeated in a Sarcophagus match by Hallowicked. Afterwards, The Whisper claimed Ophidian's mask to become the new Ophidian, while the original Ophidian adopted a new mask and the ring name Ouroboros. At CHIKARA's Season 19 premiere, Beware The Snowman, Ophidian, stealing the identity of former CHIKARA rudo 17, defeated Ophidian II (The Whisper) by knockout and put his old mask back on, and becoming the original Ophidian again. After the match, Ophidian revealed that he would face Frightmare at National Pro Wrestling Day 2018. In 2019, he would challenge Capitol Wrestling Freestyle Champion GhostShadow, unsuccessfully, for the championship.

After the allegations against Chikara, Ophidian retired from professional wrestling.

=== Training ===
Ophidian was a trainer at the Chikara Wrestle Factory and independently ran training seminars in Japan, England, Wales, Canada, Jersey (The Channel Islands), Denmark, and the United States of America before his retirement.

== Championships and accomplishments ==
- Chikara
  - Chikara Campeonatos de Parejas (1 time) – with Amasis
  - King of Trios (2019) – with Princess KimberLee and Lance Steel
  - Rey de Voladores (2010, 2017)
  - Johnny Kidd Invitational (2019)
  - Infinite Gauntlet Winner (2019)
- Chilanga Mask
  - Torneo de Parejas (2015) – with Silver Ant
- NWA Force One Pro Wrestling
  - NWA Force One Pro Wrestling Tag Team Championship (1 time) – with Amasis
- Pro Wrestling Illustrated
  - PWI ranked Ophidian #346 of the top 500 singles wrestlers in the PWI 500 in 2011
- Real Championship Wrestling
  - RCW Tag Team Championship (1 time) – with Amasis
- Vicious Outcast Wrestling
  - VOW Tag Team Championship (1 time) – with Amasis
- Channel Island World Wrestling
  - United States Champion of the World (1 time)
- Lucha Toronto
  - Lucha Premier Championship (1 time)
