= Chikarasaurus Rex: How to Hatch a Dinosaur =

2012 Chikara internet pay-per-view event

- Promotional poster featuring various Chikara wrestlers
- Promotion: Chikara
- Date: June 2, 2012
- City: Philadelphia, Pennsylvania
- Venue: Trocadero Theatre
- Attendance: 705

Pay-per-view chronology
← Previous; High Noon	Next → Under the Hood

Chikarasaurus Rex: How to Hatch a Dinosaur was a professional wrestling internet pay-per-view (iPPV) event produced by the Chikara promotion, that took place on June 2, 2012 at the Trocadero Theatre in Philadelphia, Pennsylvania and aired live on GoFightLive, with a pre-show airing live on Ustream. The event marked Chikara's second pay-per-view, following previous November's High Noon. This was the third year in which Chikara promoted a summer event under the Chikarasaurus Rex banner, with the original Chikarasaurus Rex: King of Show having taken place July 25, 2010, and the Chikarasaurus Rex: King of Sequel weekend on July 30 and 31, 2011. The event was released on DVD and downloadable MP4 by Smart Mark Video on June 4, 2012.

== Background ==
Chikarasaurus Rex: How to Hatch a Dinosaur featured seven professional wrestling matches involving different wrestlers from pre-existing scripted feuds, plots, and storylines that played out on Chikara's monthly house shows and on blog entries written on the promotion's official website. Wrestlers portray villains (rudos in Chikara) or heroes (tecnicos in Chikara) as they follow a series of events that build tension, and culminate in a wrestling match or series of matches. Chikara follows lucha libre traditions and is known for its colorful characters and gimmicks and family-friendly content.

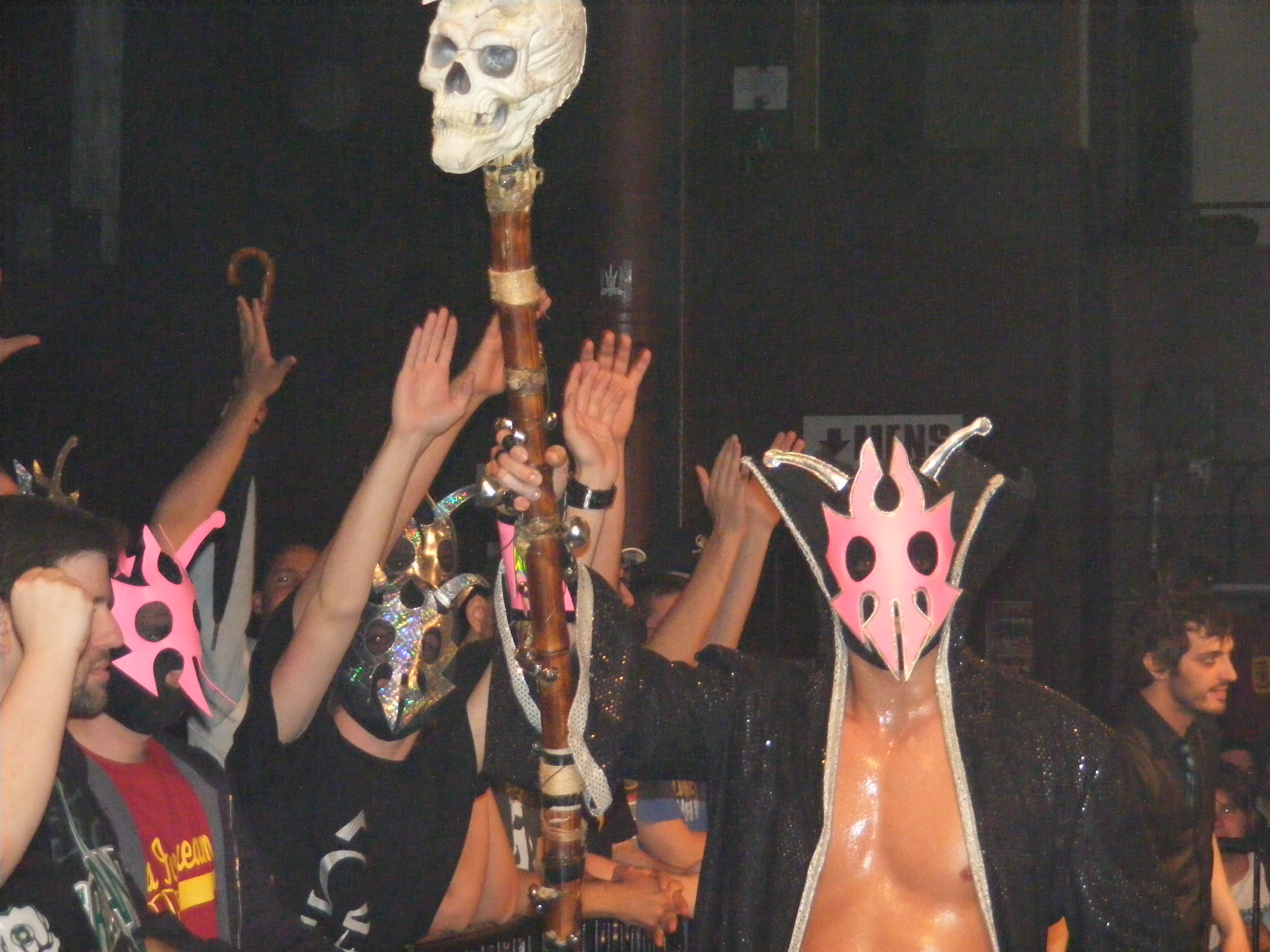
UltraMantis Black holding the staff stolen by Ophidian

The first match announced for the iPPV was between Ophidian and UltraMantis Black. After High Noon, where UltraMantis managed to regain the Eye of Tyr from Bruderschaft des Kreuzes, he used its supposed magical powers to free Delirious from its spell. After destroying the Eye of Tyr, Delirious ran away and was not seen for some time. He eventually made his return on February 25, attacking UltraMantis Black and costing him and Hallowicked their match with F.I.S.T. for the Chikara Campeonatos de Parejas. The following night, Delirious explained that he remembered everything that had happened to him during the past two years, when he was under the spell of the Eye of Tyr, first under UltraMantis Black and then under Bruderschaft des Kreuzes. As a revenge, Delirious promised to make UltraMantis suffer for the next two years, culminating in the end of his career in 2014. Meanwhile, Ophidian, who turned rudo at High Noon, started 2012 with a win streak over the likes of Hieracon, Green Ant and Archibald Peck. On March 25, Ophidian attacked UltraMantis Black, while he was distracted by Delirious, and stole his staff. Ophidian and UltraMantis Black faced each other in a singles match on April 14, with Ophidian picking up the win, after blinding his opponent with a black mist. Following the event, a rematch between the two was announced for Chikarasaurus Rex: How to Hatch a Dinosaur. On June 1, Delirious announced that while on May 20 he had adopted UltraMantis Black's strategy of "selfish gain at the expense of others" by teaming with Jakob Hammermeier and Tim Donst to get his revenge, at Chikarasaurus Rex he was going to do the opposite and assist those in need, ending an unfair advantage and harnessing the true power of "those who are victim to discrimination".

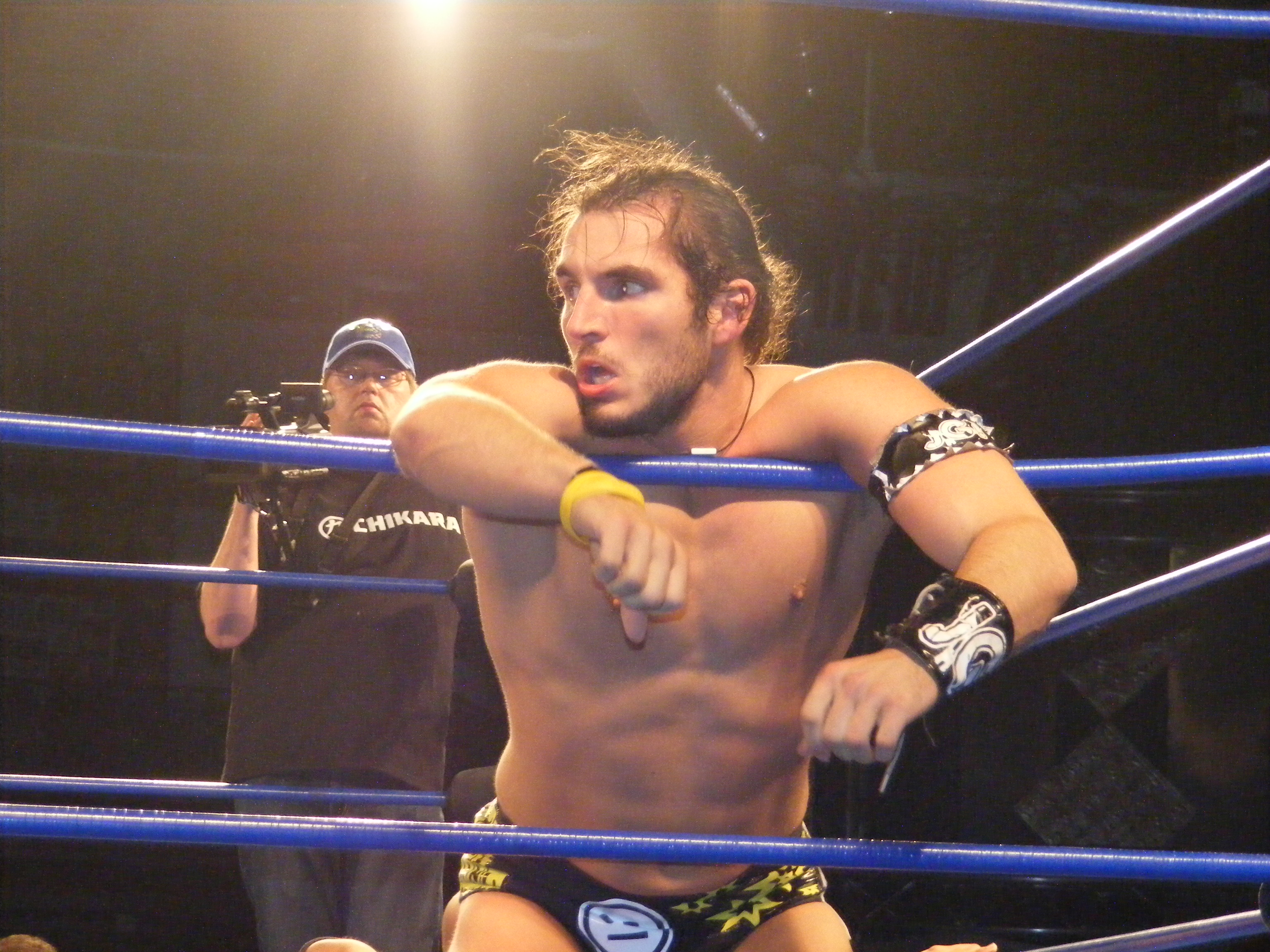
Johnny Gargano, one half of the defending Campeones de Parejas heading into Chikarasaurus Rex

The first championship match announced for the iPPV would be contested for the Chikara Campeonatos de Parejas, and would pit defending champions, F.I.S.T. (Chuck Taylor and Johnny Gargano), against the challengers, The Young Bucks (Matt Jackson and Nick Jackson). After Taylor and stand-in partner Icarus lost the Campeonatos de Parejas to 3.0 (Scott Parker and Shane Matthews) on March 24, 2012, Taylor and Gargano came back at the following event on April 14, defeating the Bravado Brothers (Harlem and Lancelot), Jack Bonza and QT Marshall, and The S.A.T. (Joel Maximo and Wil Maximo) in a four-way elimination match, scoring all three eliminations and earning three points in one match. In Chikara, teams need three points, or three back-to-back wins, in order to be eligible to challenge for the promotion's tag team championship, the Campeonatos de Parejas. On April 29, F.I.S.T. defeated 3.0 to regain the title and become the first two-time champions. Meanwhile, The Young Bucks, who had previously been seen in Chikara on November 13, 2011, at High Noon, where they were defeated by The Colony (Fire Ant and Soldier Ant), losing their two points in the process, returned to Chikara on April 28, during a special weekend, where Chikara co-promoted events with Ring of Honor (ROH), one of The Young Bucks' home promotions. During the weekend, The Young Bucks first defeated Arik Cannon and Darin Corbin in a regular tag team match and then The Batiri (Kobald and Kodama), Bruderschaft des Kreuzes (Jakob Hammermeier and Tim Donst), and the Spectral Envoy (Hallowicked and UltraMantis Black) in a four-way elimination match, scoring two of the three eliminations, to earn three points. On May 4, Chikara officially announced a championship match between the two teams for Chikarasaurus Rex: How to Hatch a Dinosaur. As per lucha libre tradition, the match would be contested under two out of three falls rules. This marked The Young Bucks' first shot at the Campeonatos de Parejas. In a blog entry on Chikara's official website, Chuck Taylor announced that F.I.S.T., longtime rudos, were now fighting for Chikara to prevent another title from slipping away from the company, like the Chikara Young Lions Cup, which was at the time held by Osaka Pro Wrestling's Tadasuke.

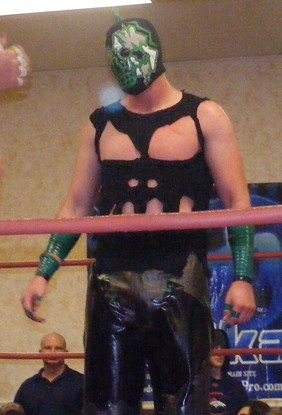
Hallowicked, who has been with Chikara since the promotion's first event in May 2002

On May 7, Chikara announced the third match of the event, a Mask vs. Hair match contested between Hallowicked and Tim Donst. The rivalry started in February 2011, when Hallowicked foiled Donst's attempt to prove that he was the greatest Young Lions Cup Champion in history. Earlier in his series of matches against former Young Lions Cup Champions, Donst had picked up a tainted win over Hallowicked, choking him out with a shoelace. During the rest of the year, Hallowicked and Donst captained opposing teams in the eighth annual torneo cibernetico match and finally met each other in a No Disqualification tag team match at High Noon, where Hallowicked teamed with UltraMantis Black and Donst with Ares. After his team's win, Hallowicked left High Noon holding Donst's Young Lions Cup. After months of unsuccessful attempts at getting his trophy back, Donst began petitioning for a singles match with his rival. After engaging in a brawl during the May 19 tenth anniversary event, the scheduled singles match between the two was changed to a Mask vs. Hair match.

The fourth match announced for the event pits Sara Del Rey and Saturyne against Kobald, Kodama and Obariyon of The Batiri in an intergender three-on-two handicap match. The rivalry started in early 2012, when The Batiri badmouthed Del Rey on Twitter, leading to a singles match on March 24, where Kobald defeated Del Rey, following interference from his stablemates. On April 14, Del Rey scored a singles win over Kodama, but was afterwards attacked by The Batiri. After Obariyon scored another tainted win over Del Rey on April 29, all three members of The Batiri once again attacked her, leading to rookie luchadora Saturyne making the save. Saturyne herself had lost a match to Kobald back on April 14 and had received threats of her own from The Batiri, so she offered to team with Del Rey at the iPPV.

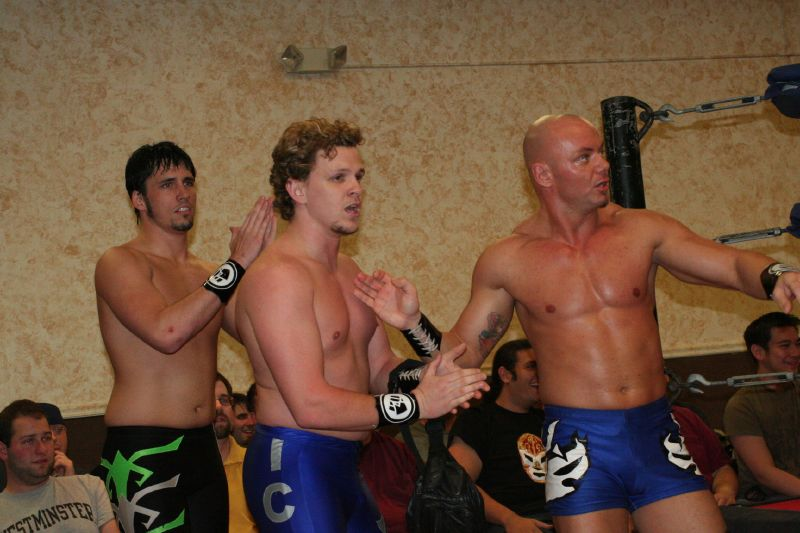
(Left to right) Chuck Taylor, Icarus and Gran Akuma as partners in F.I.S.T.

The fifth match announced for the event would see former Campeones de Parejas, Icarus and Gran Akuma, face each other in a ladder match with Akuma's Chikara contract on the line. Icarus and Chuck Taylor turned on their longtime partner Akuma on July 25, 2010, at Chikarasaurus Rex: King of Show, kicking him out of F.I.S.T. and replacing him with Johnny Gargano. After spending sixteen months away from Chikara, Akuma returned on November 14, 2011, chasing Icarus out of the ring as he was assaulting Steve "The Turtle" Weiner. The following day at High Noon, Akuma attempted to attack Icarus after his match, but accidentally hit his opponent Gregory Iron instead. On January 28, 2012, Akuma and Icarus had their first match against each other, which ended in a double countout. Akuma was then put in a trial series to earn his way back to Chikara's roster, which built to a three-on-one handicap match on April 28, where Akuma defeated all three members of F.I.S.T., following interference from Gregory Iron. Following the event, Icarus challenged his former partner to a ladder match for his Chikara contract. On May 31, Chikara announced Gregory Iron as the special guest referee of the match.

The sixth match announced for the iPPV pits Chikara Grand Champion Eddie Kingston, Jigsaw and The Colony of Fire Ant, Green Ant and Soldier Ant against Chikara's top rudo alliance Gekido of 17, assailAnt, combatAnt, deviAnt and The Shard in a ten-man tag team match. On February 26, an eight-man tag team match, where Fire Ant, Jigsaw, Mike Quackenbush and Soldier Ant faced Jakob Hammermeier, Kobald, Tim Donst and Obariyon was interrupted, when the tecnicos were attacked by five unidentified men wearing masks. Posting videos on YouTube, the five men later revealed themselves as 17, The Shard and The Swarm (assailAnt, combatAnt and deviAnt), supposed equivalents of Quackenbush, Jigsaw and The Colony, respectively. The group, named Gekido, wrestled their first matches on March 24, with combatAnt and deviAnt winning a four-way tag team match and 17 and The Shard defeating Jigsaw and Quackenbush in a tag team match, with 17 submitting Quackenbush for the win. Quackenbush, who legitimately broke his wrist during the match, later claimed to have figured out that the members of The Swarm were "Jose and two Franks", wrestlers who in the past trained under him at the Chikara Wrestle Factory, but dropped out before graduating. In a blog entry, deviAnt confirmed that Quackenbush had gotten their identities right, claiming that they were treated like slaves at the Chikara Wrestle Factory, while also feeling that Chikara, at the time, was a sinking ship. The Shard also revealed to have had a personal relationship with Jigsaw, claiming that the two were trained together at Kevin Knight's Independent Wrestling Federation (IWF) wrestling school, but turned down Jigsaw's invite to join him at the Chikara Wrestle Factory, when Jigsaw and, among others, Eddie Kingston were kicked out of IWF in 2002. Finally, 17 revealed that he had never met Quackenbush, but had been following his career, training under the same people and considered himself just as talented as him, but was never able to receive similar acclaim and attention. His name was a reference to the seventeen "forgotten submission holds" that even Quackenbush, nicknamed "The Master of a Thousand Holds", was supposedly unfamiliar with. All five men claimed to be more talented than any Chikara wrestler, but the public had been fooled by the colorful characters and masks of the likes of The Colony and Jigsaw. With rudo referee Derek Sabato acting as the liaison between Chikara and Gekido, the promotion eventually agreed to the group's demands in order to stop the attacks and made 17, assailAnt, combatAnt, deviAnt and The Shard official members of Chikara's roster. Following their debuts, Gekido remained undefeated inside Chikara ring, before Jigsaw submitted combatAnt in an eight-man tag team match on April 28.

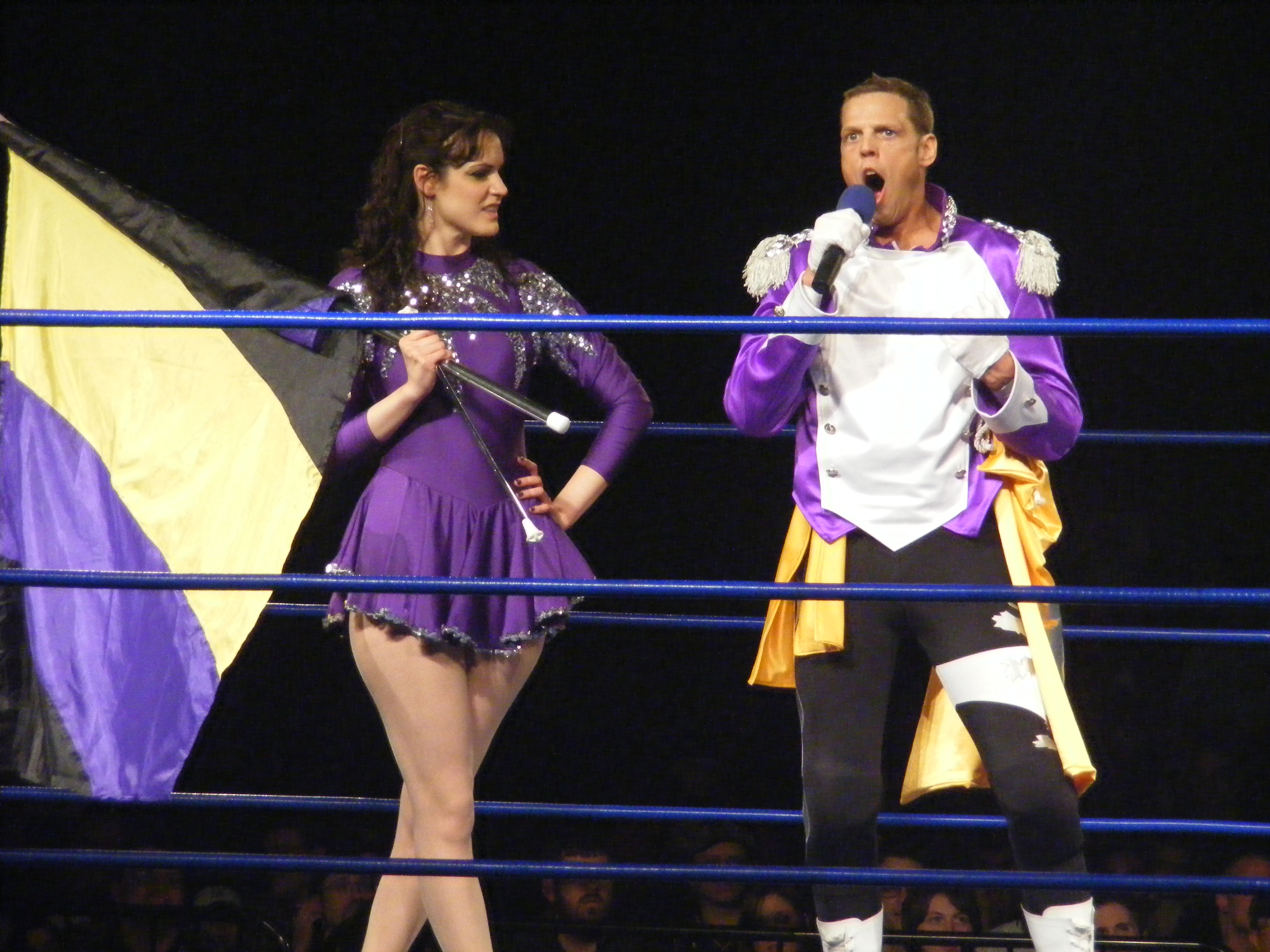
Archibald Peck and Veronica together in April 2011

The seventh match announced for the iPPV would see Colt Cabana and Mixed Martial Archie face The Throwbacks (Dasher Hatfield and Mark Angelosetti) in a Loser Leaves Town tag team match. After losing to Colt Cabana at High Noon, Archibald Peck started off 2012 with losses against Hallowicked, Sara Del Rey, Ophidian, Dasher Hatfield and Chuck Taylor, which led to his valet Veronica breaking off the relationship between the two. Peck then turned into Mixed Martial Archie, adopting a gimmick of a mixed martial artist in an attempt to show Veronica that he could be tough and a winner, effectively turning tecnico in the process. While Archie ended his losing streak on April 28 in a match against Kobald, Veronica aligned herself with "Mr. Touchdown" Mark Angelosetti, one half of the tag team The Throwbacks. On May 19, Colt Cabana returned to Chikara, defeating Angelosetti in a singles match. The following day, the other half of The Throwbacks, Dasher Hatfield, defeated Cabana, when Angelosetti interfered in the match, while Veronica distracted Hatfield and the referee of the match. On May 23, Archie and Cabana, now with a common enemy in Angelosetti, decided to team up against The Throwbacks at the iPPV. Originally announced as a regular tag team match, on May 28, Chikara announced an added stipulation, where the loser of the fall would have to leave the promotion.

== Event ==
Other on-screen personnel
Role:	Name:
Commentators	Bryce Remsburg
Commentators	Leonard F. Chikarason
Commentators	Sugar Dunkerton
Commentators	UltraMantis Black
Ring announcers	Gavin Loudspeaker
Referees	Bryce Remsburg
Referees	Gregory Iron
Referees	Jonathan Barber

=== Pre-show ===
Before the start of Chikarasaurus Rex: How to Hatch a Dinosaur, Chikara presented a special 25 minute Pre-Show-A-GoGo, which aired live on Ustream. Hosted by Billy Kumohara and Veda Scott, the show started with Gekido carrying out Fire Ant and announcing that their match on the iPPV was now four-on-five. The show also included pre-match interviews with Mixed Martial Archie, Tim Donst, Kobald and Eddie Kingston.

=== Preliminary matches ===
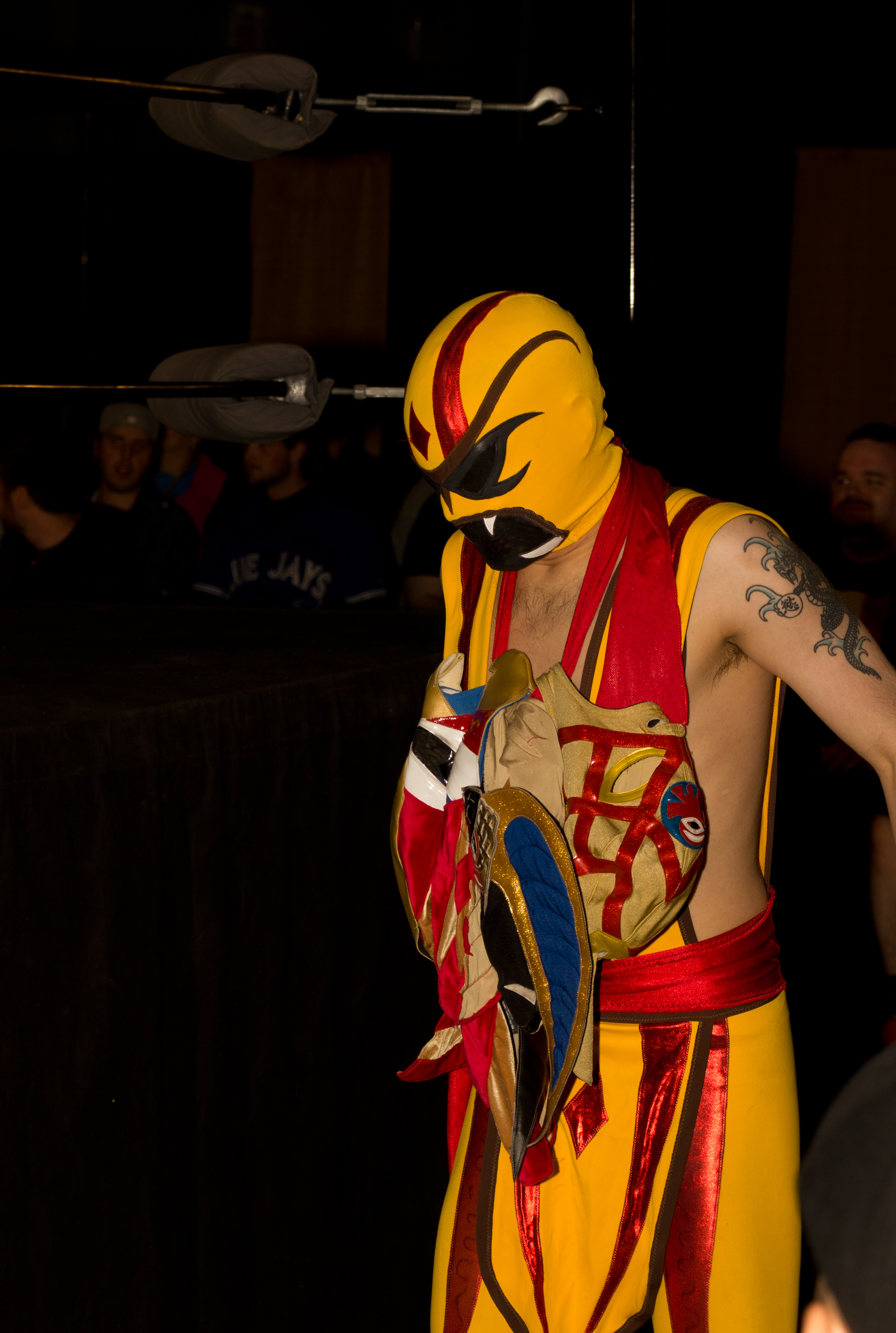
Ophidian wearing his new mask and carrying his old mask and the masks of both Amasis and Hieracon

Chikarasaurus Rex: How to Hatch a Dinosaur started off with a match between Ophidian and UltraMantis Black to determine the "Most Devious Entity in Chikara". Ophidian, having completed his "evolution" with help from UltraMantis' staff, debuted a new mask during the match. At the end of the match, Ophidian grabbed UltraMantis' staff, but was quickly disarmed by referee Jonathan Barber. As Barber was busy taking the staff out of the ring, Ophidian hit UltraMantis with the red mist, but the following small package was only good for a near-fall. After getting back to his feet, UltraMantis hit Ophidian with a Praying Mantis Bomb for the three count and the win.

In the second match of the iPPV, the self-proclaimed Team Tapoutback Steakhouse of Colt Cabana and Mixed Martial Archie took on The Throwbacks of Dasher Hatfield and Mark Angelosetti in a Loser Leaves Town match. For the match, the commentary team was joined by the returning third member of The Throwbacks, Sugar Dunkerton, who on February 3, 2012, had announced an indefinite break from professional wrestling due to personal issues. Archie was quickly taken out of the match, after Angelosetti dropped him onto the entrance ramp with a spinebuster, leaving Cabana to wrestle alone for the majority of the match. Eventually, Archie returned as Archibald Peck and was dominating Angelosetti, before being distracted by Veronica appearing on the entrance stage. Veronica then entered the ring and dropped a baton between Angelosetti and Peck, however, Hatfield ended up getting his hands on the baton before the other two men. As Hatfield gave the baton to the referee of the match, Angelosetti took advantage of the distraction and hit Peck with his football helmet and then threw Hatfield on top of him for the pinfall victory. As a result, Peck was forced to leave Chikara, while The Throwbacks earned their third point and a future shot at the Campeonatos de Parejas. After the match, Angelosetti and Veronica kissed in front of a dejected Peck.

In the third match, former tag team partners Gran Akuma and Icarus faced each other in the second ladder match in Chikara history. As Akuma was in control of the match, Chuck Taylor and Johnny Gargano ran out, tossed special guest referee Gregory Iron out of the ring, set up a table and laid Akuma on top of it. Icarus began climbing the ladder just as Iron re-entered the ring with a steel chain and chased Taylor and Gargano out of the arena. Akuma rose from the table, stopped Icarus, powerbombed him off the ladder through the table and then climbed the ladder to grab the clipboard, win the match and earn a Chikara contract.

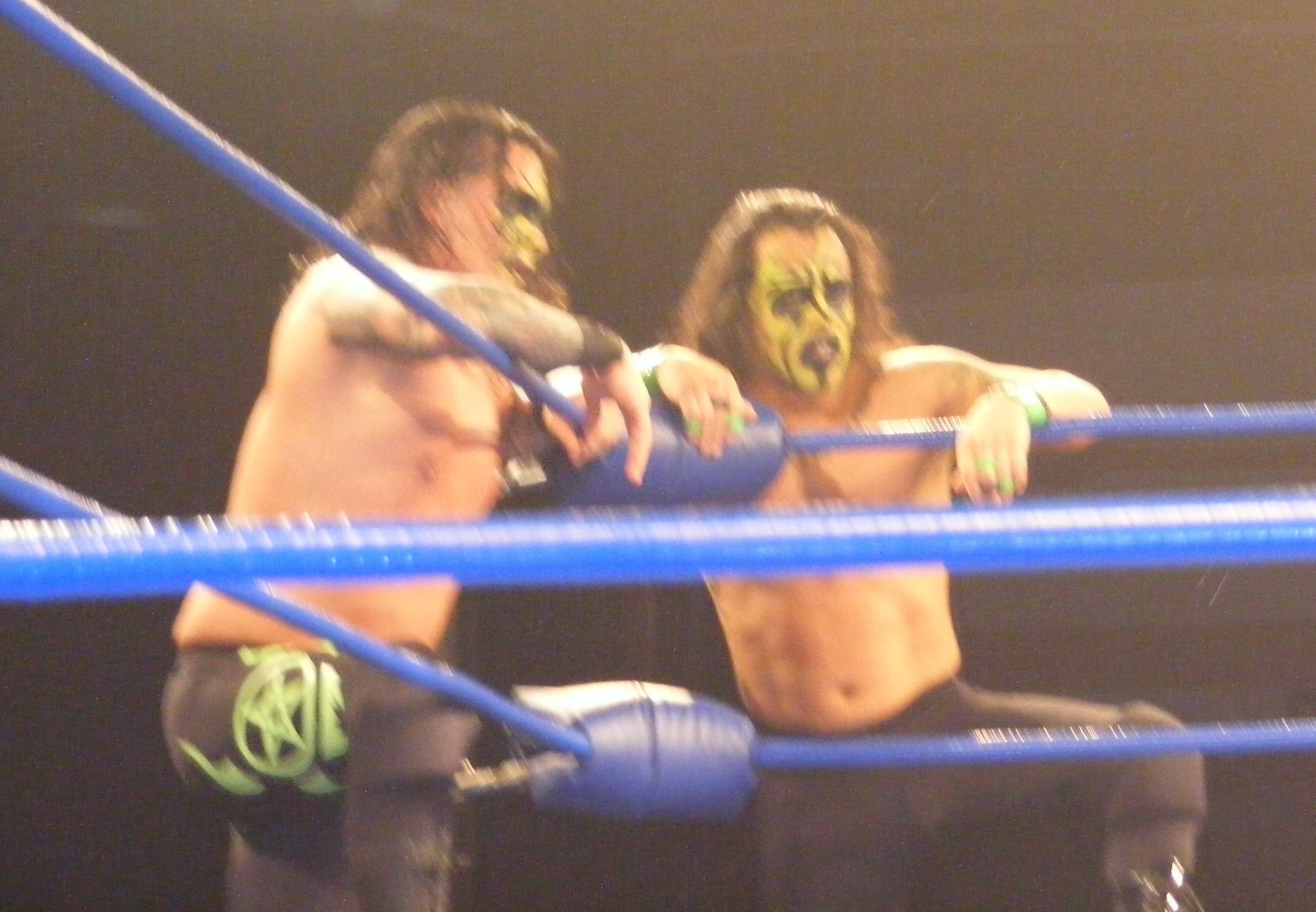
(Left to right) Obariyon and Kodama of The Batiri

The fourth match of the event saw Sara Del Rey and Saturyne face The Batiri of Kobald, Kodama and Obariyon in a two-on-three handicap match. At the end, just as Del Rey was preparing Obariyon for her finisher maneuver, Royal Butterfly, Delirious, who had come out to watch the match, entered the ring and attacked both Saturyne and Del Rey, causing a disqualification. After the match, Delirious kissed each member of The Batiri on the forehead.

=== Main event matches ===
Following an intermission, Hallowicked took on his longtime rival Tim Donst in a Mask vs. Hair match. Towards the end of the match, Donst pulled referee Bryce Remsburg in front of a Hallowicked charge, which, in storyline, knocked him out and took him out of the match. Hallowicked then locked Donst in a Chikara Special, the signature hold of the promotion, which led to Donst submitting, but as Remsburg was not able to call for the bell, the match continued. After being released from the hold, Donst grabbed a steel chair and Hallowicked retaliated by grabbing Donst's Young Lions Cup trophy and threatening to destroy it. Hallowicked then threw the trophy to Donst and as he grabbed it, hit him with a big boot for a near-fall counted by a slow moving Remsburg. As Hallowicked tried to revive Remsburg, Donst hit him with a low blow and then started choking him with a shoelace. As Remsburg got up, he checked Hallowicked, deemed him unconscious and ended the match, giving Donst the win. As Hallowicked was getting ready to be unmasked, Remsburg raised Donst's arm as a sign of his victory, but then noticed the shoelace in his hand, realized what had happened and ordered the match to be restarted. Immediately afterwards, Hallowicked hit Donst with another big boot, before locking him in his own finishing maneuver, From Dusk 'til Donst, for a submission win. After the match, Hallowicked shaved Donst's head before posing with both his and Donst's Young Lions Cup trophies. Hallowicked then threw Donst his trophy and exited the ring. The segment ended with Donst throwing his trophy down and spitting on it.

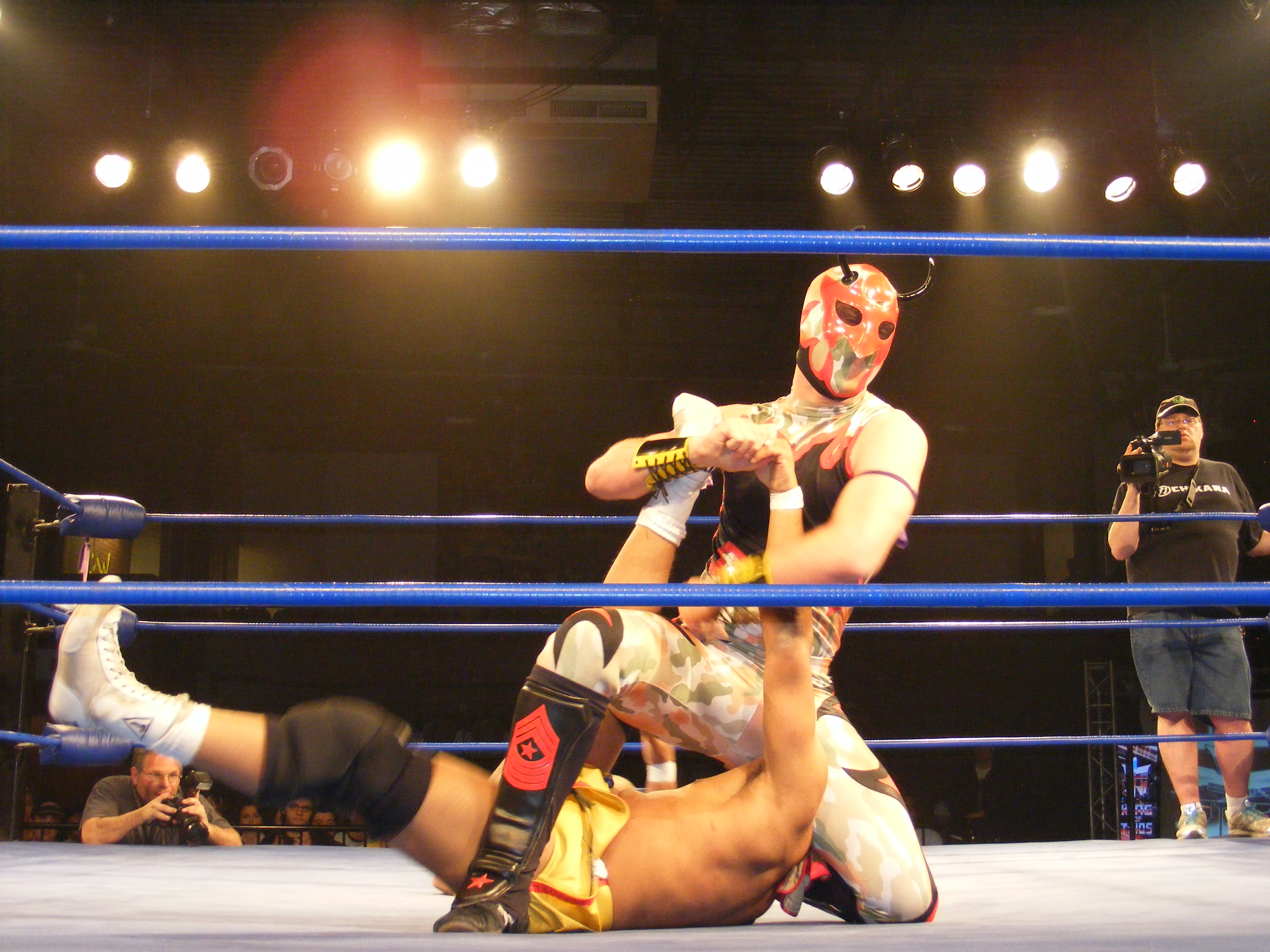
Soldier Ant performing the Chikara Special

In the semi-main event, invader group Gekido of 17, assailAnt, combatAnt, deviAnt and The Shard, accompanied by Derek Sabato, faced Chikara representatives Eddie Kingston, Green Ant, Jigsaw and Soldier Ant. The match started as a five-on-four handicap match, following Gekido's pre-show assault on Fire Ant, but shortly after the opening bell the returning Mike Quackenbush entered the match to even out the numbers, starting off by hitting Sabato with a palm strike, taking him out of the equation. The match featured several attempts from both sides at removing their opponents' masks, which would have resulted in a disqualification. At the end of the match, Green Ant dove from the Trocadero's balcony onto the opposing team, before all ten men entered the ring for a large brawl. 17 was close to unmasking Soldier Ant, but a double suplex from Green Ant and Quackenbush put an end to his attempt. The Chikara team followed up by performing a five-man Ant Hill onto 17, after which Soldier Ant locked him in a Chikara Special, while his teammates prevented the other Gekido members from making the save. Eventually, 17 was forced to submit, giving Chikara the win. After the match, Quackenbush whispered something to 17 and then grabbed his wrist and appeared to break his fingers as a revenge for how he had been injured on March 24.

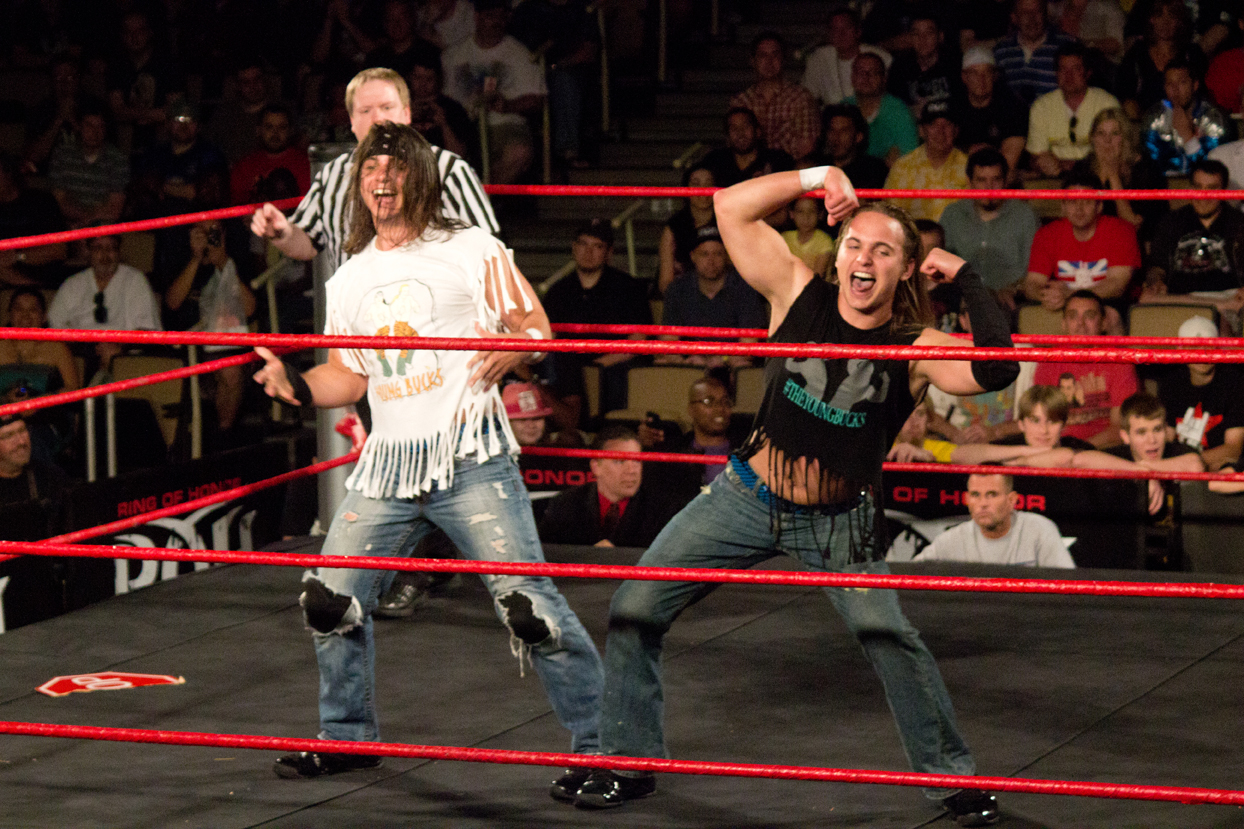
The Young Bucks, the new Campeones de Parejas

In the main event of the evening, F.I.S.T. of Chuck Taylor and Johnny Gargano defended the Chikara Campeonatos de Parejas against The Young Bucks of Matt and Nick Jackson in a two out of three falls match. The challengers won the first fall, when Matt pinned Taylor with a roll-up. Later, F.I.S.T. tied the score, when Taylor pinned Matt, while holding his tights for leverage. In the final fall, The Young Bucks went for their double-team finishing maneuver, More Bang for Your Buck, but the attempt was countered by Taylor and followed by Gargano throwing Nick into his brother with the Lawn Dart, legitimately breaking Nick's nose in the process. F.I.S.T. followed up with a DDT / Hurts Donut combination, which resulted in a near-fall. The Young Bucks regained control of the match, when Matt hit Taylor with one of the championship belts for a near-fall. The Young Bucks followed up by performing a spike tombstone piledriver on Taylor, but Gargano broke up the pinfall attempt. The Young Bucks retaliated by hitting Gargano with a double superkick and a More Bang for Your Buck to win the third fall and become the new Campeones de Parejas.

The pay-per-view ended with two vignettes. In the first, Archibald Peck walked silently past the Rocky statue in front of the Philadelphia Museum of Art. The second vignette, a hype video for September's 2012 King of Trios tournament, was interrupted by Tommy Dreamer announcing that he was going to take part in the tournament, where he would form a trio with Jerry Lynn and Too Cold Scorpio.

== Reception ==
Sean Radican of Pro Wrestling Torch called Chikarasaurus Rex: How to Hatch a Dinosaur "a very good show from start to finish", adding that "Chikara did some nice things production-wise that I wish other companies would do, as things were broken up with interviews, highlight packages, and brand new segments". Jason Namako of Wrestleview wrote "to say that this was a good show is a vast understatement because this show was outstanding from top to bottom" and "this show last night showed me why I love pro wrestling and have since I was 4 years old". Both Radican and Namako praised the Chikara fans in attendance at the Trocadero for their enthusiasm and for creating a fun atmosphere for the event. 411Mania's Kevin Ford wrote that Chikarasaurus Rex was "easily Chikara's show of the year so far", giving it a final score of 8.5 out of 10.

== Aftermath ==
Following the event, Chikara started a series titled Where in the World is Archibald Peck? on its YouTube page, with each episode depicting Peck walking, in his wrestling gear, to somber music in different major cities across the United States. The series aired weekly until July 20, when Peck, in his video, reached the outskirts of Dallas. Peck returned to Chikara on July 28, working under a mask as "The Mysterious and Handsome Stranger". The events at Chikarasaurus Rex led to a storyline involving Peck, which lasted until 2014. After The Mysterious and Handsome Stranger unmasked as Peck at December 2012's Under the Hood, it was explained that there were actually two Archibald Pecks. According to the storyline, the "original" Archibald Peck, after taken backstage during his match at Chikarasaurus Rex, got into an altercation with Eddie Kingston, which resulted in Kingston hitting him with the Backfist to the Future, which actually sent him back in time to 1885, while another Peck emerged to take his place in the match, eventually losing it and being forced to leave Chikara. After taking another backfist in 1885, the "original" Peck was transported back to 2012, but missed Chikarasaurus Rex and instead returned as The Mysterious and Handsome Stranger. As he was not the Peck, who had been pinned at Chikarasarus Rex, he was allowed to remain in the promotion. In May 2013, Peck took yet another Backfist to the Future and was supposedly sent back to Chikarasaurus Rex to finish the match and fix the two Peck paradox. The storyline concluded in early 2014 with 3.0 going on a road trip to find Peck, who had been wandering around ever since losing the match at Chikarasaurus Rex, bringing him back to Chikara.

On June 4, Fire Ant revealed the reason why he was taken out of the ten-man tag team match, when he announced that he had suffered a broken left ankle, which would sideline him for an estimated ten to twelve weeks. After earning their third point at Chikarasaurus Rex: How to Hatch a Dinosaur, Dasher Hatfield and Mark Angelosetti received their shot at the Campeonatos de Parejas on July 29, but failed in their attempt to dethrone The Young Bucks. After losing 17 at Chikarasaurus Rex, Gekido went on a losing streak against the likes of 3.0, Gran Akuma, Green Ant, Jigsaw, The Mysterious and Handsome Stranger, and Sugar Dunkerton. After not being heard from in nine weeks, 17 returned in a blog entry on Chikara's official website on August 6, threatening that Quackenbush's inability to finish him off would come back to haunt him. 17 also revealed that Quackenbush had told him to leave Chikara and never return, before breaking his fingers, while also claiming to feel vindicated by Quackenbush's act, noting that Gekido's goal from the outset was to expose Chikara's "dark underbelly". On August 18, 17 returned to the ring with Quackenbush in a tag team match, where he and The Shard faced Quackenbush and Jigsaw. Quackenbush lost the match, being disqualified for "excessive punishment" after hitting 17 with all four versions of his Quackendriver. Three days later, 17's profile was removed from the promotion's official website, with Derek Sabato announcing that his Chikara career had ended as a result of Quackenbush's actions. The character of 17 returned in late 2013 as part of a group of rudos from Chikara's past; however, this 17 was actually Ophidian under the mask.

== Results ==
No.	Results	Stipulations	Times
1	UltraMantis Black defeated Ophidian	Singles match	11:03
2	The Throwbacks (Dasher Hatfield and Mark Angelosetti) defeated Team Tapoutback Steakhouse (Archibald Peck and Colt Cabana)	Loser Leaves Town tag team match	16:15
3	Gran Akuma defeated Icarus	Ladder match, with Gregory Iron as the special guest referee	16:07
4	Sara Del Rey and Saturyne defeated The Batiri (Kobald, Kodama and Obariyon) by disqualification	Three-on-two handicap match	08:59
5	Hallowicked defeated Tim Donst	Mask vs. Hair match	14:13
6	Eddie Kingston, Jigsaw, Mike Quackenbush, Green Ant and Soldier Ant defeated Gekido (17, assailAnt, combatAnt, deviAnt and The Shard) (with Derek Sabato)	Ten-man tag team match	09:24
7	The Young Bucks (Matt Jackson and Nick Jackson) defeated F.I.S.T. (Chuck Taylor and Johnny Gargano) (c)	Two out of three falls tag team match for the Chikara Campeonatos de Parejas	22:51
(c) / – the champion(s) heading into the match
