= Chikara Campeonatos de Parejas =

Professional wrestling tag team championship

Details
- Promotion: Chikara
- Date established: February 26, 2006
- Date retired: June 24, 2020
Statistics
- First champions: The Kings of Wrestling (Chris Hero and Claudio Castagnoli)
- Final champions: The Bird and the Bee (Solo Darling and Willow Nightingale)
- Most reigns: F.I.S.T. (Chuck Taylor and Johnny Gargano)/3.0 (Scott Parker and Shane Matthews) (2 reigns)
- Longest reign: Pieces of Hate (Jigsaw and The Shard) (413 days)
- Shortest reign: The Rumblebees (Solo Darling and Travis Huckabee) (<1 day)

The Chikara Campeonatos de Parejas (Chikara Tag Team championship) was a professional wrestling tag team championship contested for in the Philadelphia, Pennsylvania based promotion Chikara.

== History ==
The Campeonatos de Parejas was introduced in February 2006. The creation of the title was the foundation of that year's Tag World Grand Prix tag team tournament, scheduled to be the final TWGP for the promotion. The title was to be awarded to the winning team of the tournament. The eventual winners were the team of Chris Hero and Claudio Castagnoli, The Kings of Wrestling, who defeated Milano Collection A.T. and Skayde (Team DragonDoor) in the finals of the tournament to be crowned the first Campeones de Parejas.

The Kings of Wrestling (Chris Hero and Claudio Castagnoli) were the first champion in the title's history, having won the title on February 26, 2006. Pieces of Hate (Jigsaw and The Shard) holds the record for the longest reign in the title's history, at 413 days. The Rumblebees (Solo Darling and Travis Huckabee) hold the record for the shortest reign, at less than one day. 3.0 (Scott Parker and Shane Matthews), and F.I.S.T. (Chuck Taylor and Johnny Gargano) share the record for most reigns as a team with two, while Parker, Matthews, Quackenbush/El Hijo del Ice Cream, Taylor, Gargano, Claudio Castagnoli and Jigsaw share the record for most reigns individually, also with two. Overall, there have been 25 reigns shared among 42 different wrestlers and 23 teams.

=== Earning a title shot ===
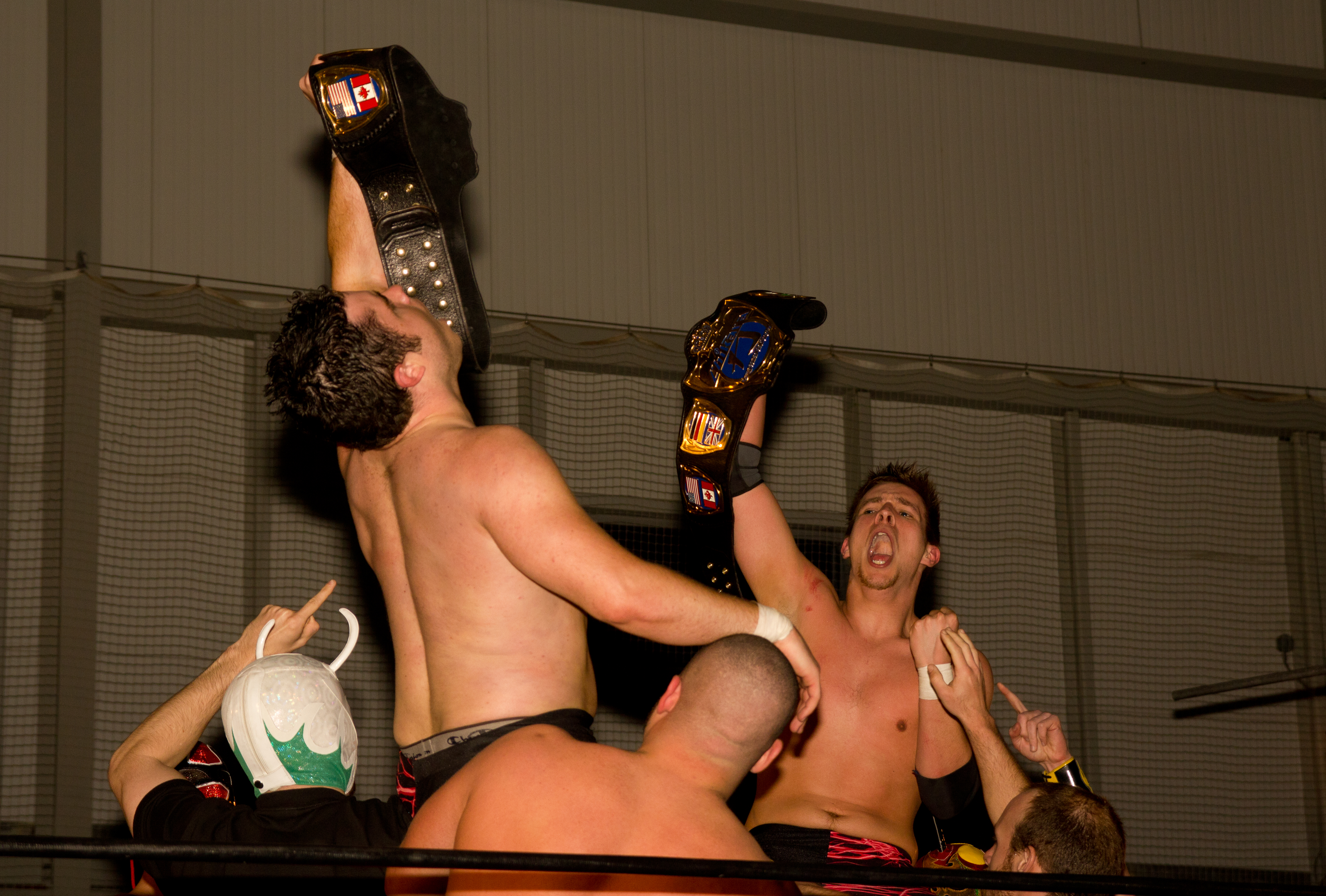
Former two-time champions, 3.0, celebrating their first title win over F.I.S.T.

This title, when compared to other titles, is unorthodox due to the nature of how a team earns a title shot. A team becomes eligible to challenge for the Campeonatos de Parejas as soon as they earn three points. Teams rack up points by winning tag team matches. As soon as they get the three points, they can challenge the reigning Campeones for the title. However, if they lose a match, the team loses all of their points and must start again. Essentially, when a duo wins three tag team matches in a row, they are eligible to have a title shot. As of You Only Live Twice, all previous points accumulated by teams have been reset and removed entirely. Per Lucha Libre tradition, title defenses are Campeones vs. Retadores in Two out of Three Falls match.

== Reigns ==
Key
No.	Overall reign number
Reign	Reign number for the specific team—reign numbers for the individuals are in parentheses, if different
Days	Number of days held
Defenses	Number of successful defenses

No.	Champion	Championship change			Reign statistics			Notes	Ref.
No.	Champion	Date	Event	Location	Reign	Days	Defenses	Notes	Ref.
1	The Kings of Wrestling (Chris Hero and Claudio Castagnoli)	February 26, 2006	Tag World Grand Prix 2006: Night Three	Philadelphia, PA	1	264	2	Castagnoli and Hero defeated Milano Collection A.T. and Skayde in the finals of the Tag World Grand Prix 2006 tournament to become the inaugural champions.	
2	Team F.I.S.T. (Gran Akuma and Icarus)	November 17, 2006	Brick	Philadelphia, PA	1	343	3		
3	Incoherence (Delirious and Hallowicked)	October 26, 2007	Bruised	Reading, PA	1	331	5	Delirious and Hallowicked defeated Icarus and Chuck Taylor, who replaced an injured Gran Akuma, to win the championship.	
4	Super Smash Bros. (Stupefied and Player Uno)	September 21, 2008	Laying In The Gutter, Looking At The Stars	Cleveland, OH	1	28	0		
5	The Osirian Portal (Amasis and Ophidian)	October 19, 2008	The Global Gauntlet: Night Two	Philadelphia, PA	1	329	3		
6	The Colony (Fire Ant and Soldier Ant)	September 13, 2009	Hiding In Plain Sight	Nashua, NH	1	188	4		
7	Bruderschaft des Kreuzes (Ares and Claudio Castagnoli (2))	March 20, 2010	Wit, Verve And A Bit O' Nerve	Easton, PA	1	267	4		
8	Jigsaw and Mike Quackenbush	December 12, 2010	Reality Is Relative	Reading, PA	1	280	2		
9	F.I.S.T. (Chuck Taylor and Johnny Gargano)	September 18, 2011	Martyr Yourself To Caution	New York City, NY	1	188	4		
10	3.0 (Scott Parker and Shane Matthews)	March 24, 2012	Green Ice	Vaughan, ON	1	36	0	Parker and Matthews defeated Chuck Taylor and Icarus, who replaced an injured Johnny Gargano, to win the championship.	
11	F.I.S.T. (Chuck Taylor and Johnny Gargano)	April 29, 2012	The Contaminated Cowl	Lafayette, IN	2	34	0		
12	The Young Bucks (Matt Jackson and Nick Jackson)	June 2, 2012	Chikarasaurus Rex: How To Hatch A Dinosaur	Philadelphia, PA	1	253	3		
13	3.0 (Scott Parker and Shane Matthews)	February 10, 2013	While The Dawn Is Breaking	Easton, PA	2	112	2		
14	Pieces of Hate (Jigsaw (2) and The Shard)	June 2, 2013	Aniversario: Never Compromise	Philadelphia, PA	1	413	0		
15	The Throwbacks (Dasher Hatfield and Mark Angelosetti)	July 20, 2014	The World Is Not Enough	Revere, MA	1	139	1		
16	The Devastation Corporation (Blaster McMassive and Max Smashmaster)	December 6, 2014	Tomorrow Never Dies	Philadelphia, PA	1	295	3		
17	N_R_G (Hype Rockwell and Race Jaxon)	September 27, 2015	The Marta Complex	Norfolk, VA	1	300	3		
—	Vacated	July 23, 2016	Back in the Habit	Toronto, ON	—	—	—	The championship held up due to a referee error where Los Ice Creams had been awarded the title despite only winning the first fall in a two out of three falls match.	
18	Moustache Mountain (Tyler Bate and Trent Seven)	August 21, 2016	No One's First, And You're Next	Philadelphia, PA	1	116	0	This was a double elimination tag team match, also involving The Devastation Corporation (Blaster McMassive and Flex Rumblecrunch), Los Ice Creams (El Hijo del Ice Cream and Ice Cream Jr.) and N_R_G (Hype Rockwell and Race Jaxon).	
—	Vacated	December 15, 2016	—	—	—	—	—	Moustache Mountain were stripped of the championships when they signed a contract with WWE	
19	Cornelius Crummels and Sonny Defarge	December 29, 2016	The Shape Of Things To Come	Philadelphia, PA	1	191	3	Crummels and Defarge defeated The Closers (Rick Roland and Sloan Caprice) and The Throwbacks (Dasher Hatfield and Mark Angelosetti) in a three-way match to win the vacant title.	
20	The Rumblebees (Solo Darling and Travis Huckabee)	July 8, 2017	The Lodger	Gibsonville, NC	1	<1	0		
21	Los Ice Creams (El Hijo del Ice Cream and Ice Cream Jr.)	July 8, 2017	The Lodger	Gibsonville, NC	1	224	0		
22	The Closers (Rick Roland and Sloan Caprice)	February 17, 2018	National Pro Wrestling Day 2018	Philadelphia, PA	1	294	3		
23	Princess KimberLee and The Whisper	December 8, 2018	Let's Get Invisible	Philadelphia, PA	1	140	1		
24	F.I.S.T. (Tony Deppen and Travis Huckabee (2))	April 27, 2019	Fright Night	Pocono Summit, PA	1	196	1		
25	The Bird And The Bee (Solo Darling (2) and Willow Nightingale)	November 9, 2019	Tug of War	Philadelphia, PA	1	228	0		
—	Deactivated	June 24, 2020	—	—	—	—	—	Deactivated when Chikara closed down.	

== Combined reigns ==
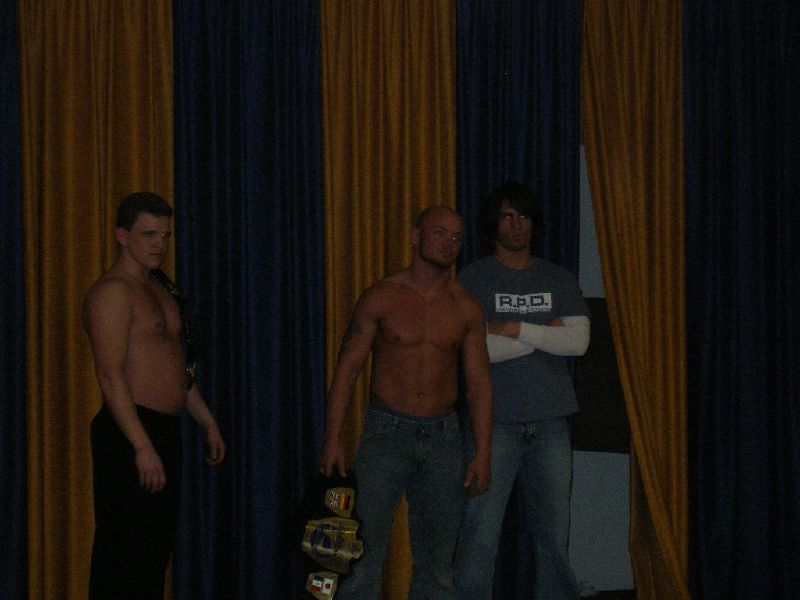
Team F.I.S.T. (Gran Akuma and Icarus) with the title belts in 2007.

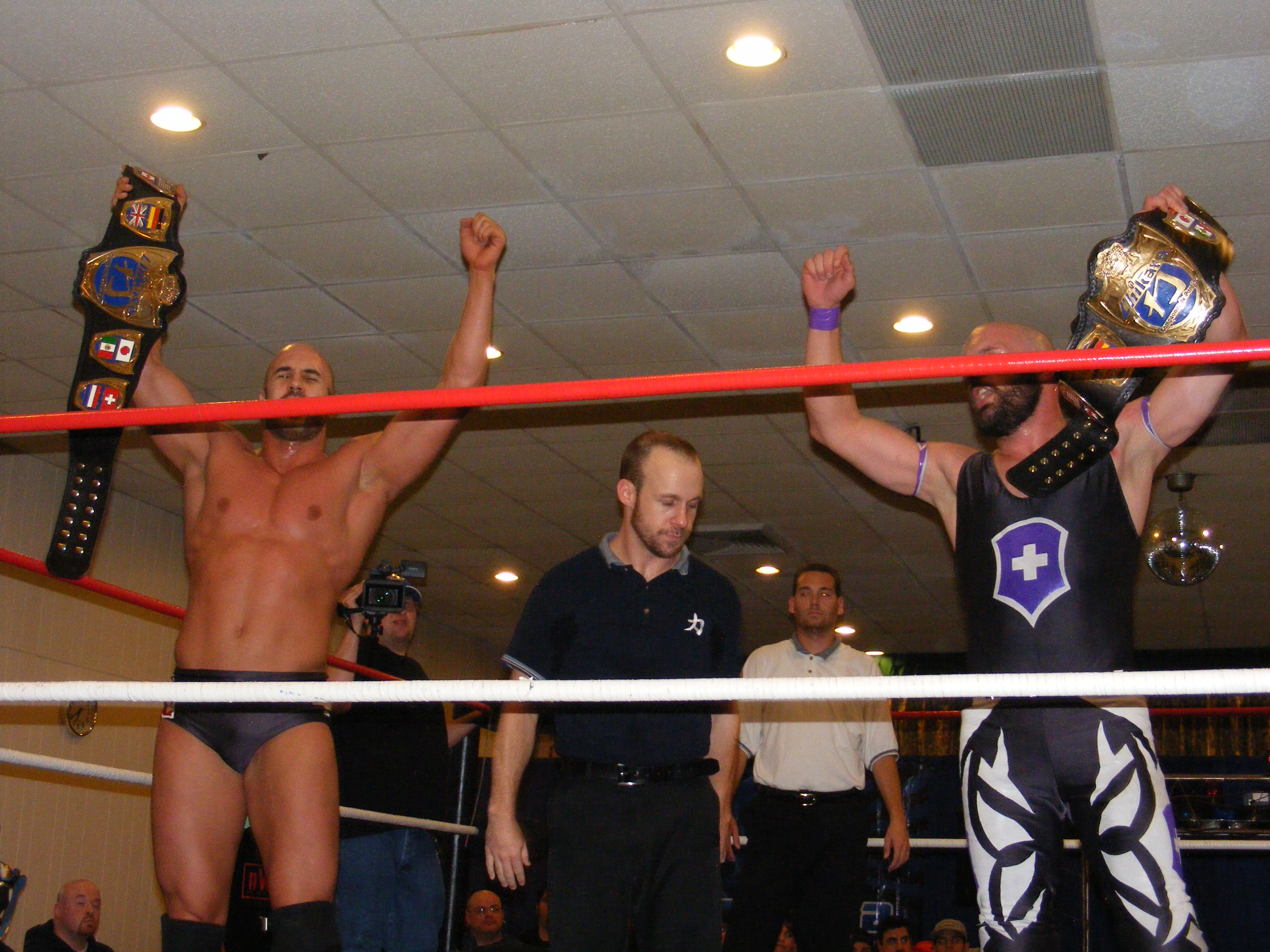
Bruderschaft des Kreuzes (Ares and Claudio Castagnoli) with the title belts in October 2010.

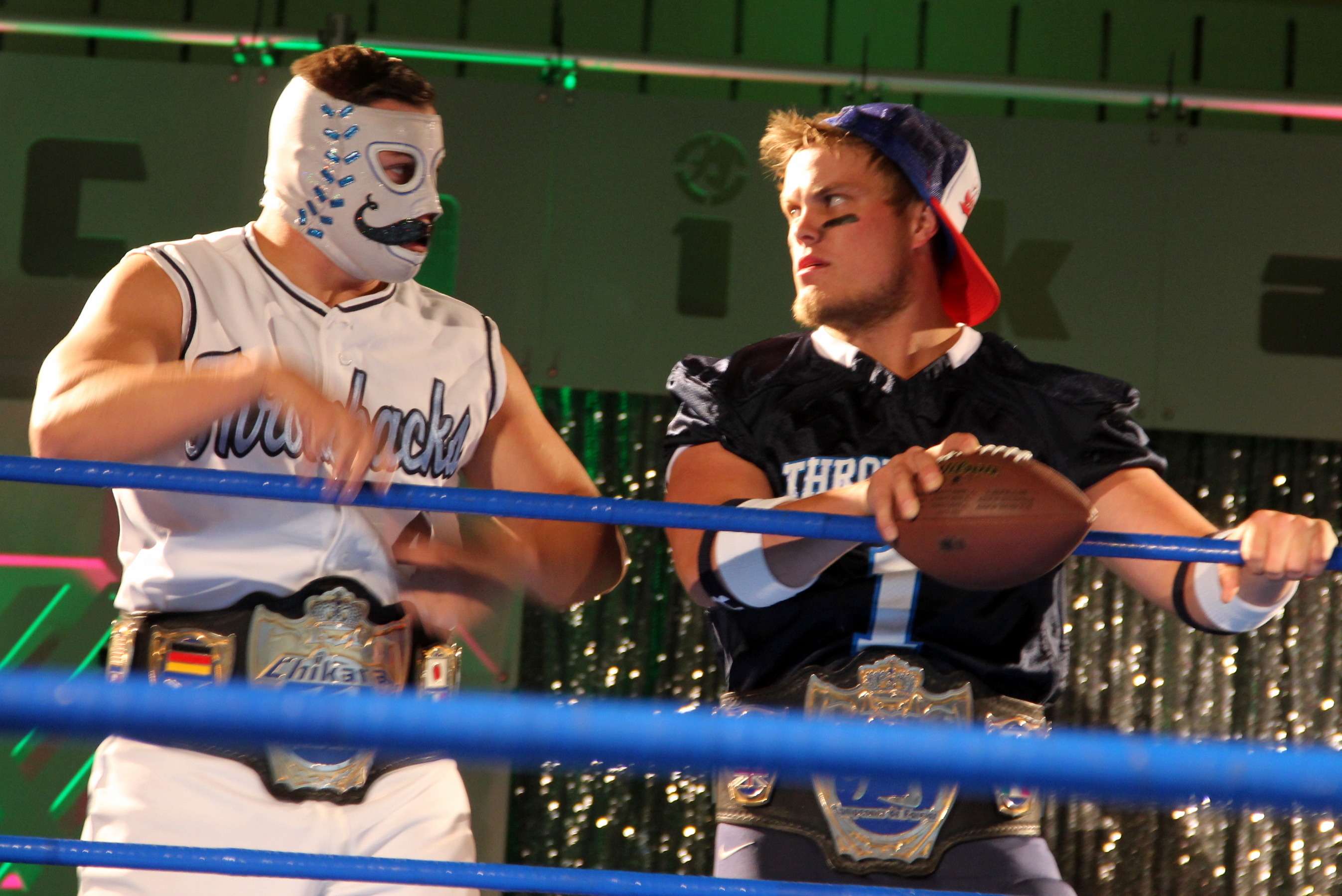
The Throwbacks (Dasher Hatfield and Mark Angelosetti) with the title belts in September 2014

=== By team ===
Rank	Team	No. of reigns	Combined defenses	Combined days
1	Pieces of Hate (Jigsaw and The Shard)	1	0	413
2	Team F.I.S.T. (Gran Akuma and Icarus)	1	3	343
3	Incoherence (Delirious and Hallowicked)	1	5	331
4	The Osirian Portal (Amasis and Ophidian)	1	3	329
5	N_R_G (Hype Rockwell and Race Jaxon)	1	3	300
6	The Devastation Corporation (Blaster McMassive and Max Smashmaster)	1	3	295
7	The Closers (Rick Roland and Sloan Caprice)	1	2	294
8	Jigsaw and Mike Quackenbush	1	2	280
9	Bruderschaft des Kreuzes (Ares and Claudio Castagnoli)	1	4	267
10	The Kings of Wrestling (Chris Hero and Claudio Castagnoli)	1	2	264
11	The Young Bucks (Matt Jackson and Nick Jackson)	1	3	253
12	Los Ice Creams (El Hijo del Ice Cream and Ice Cream Jr.)	2	0	228
13	F.I.S.T. (Chuck Taylor and Johnny Gargano)	2	4	222
14	The Bird And The Bee (Solo Darling and Willow Nightingale)	1	0	228
15	F.I.S.T. (Tony Deppen and Travis Huckabee)	1	1	196
16	Cornelius Crummels and Sonny Defarge	1	2	191
17	The Colony (Fire Ant and Soldier Ant)	1	4	188
18	3.0 (Scott Parker and Shane Matthews)	2	2	148
19	Princess KimberLee and The Whisper	1	0	140
20	The Throwbacks (Dasher Hatfield and Mark Angelosetti)	1	1	139
21	Moustache Mountain (Trent Seven and Tyler Bate)	1	0	116
22	Super Smash Bros. (Player Dos and Player Uno)	1	0	28
23	The Rumblebees (Solo Darling and Travis Huckabee)	1	0	<1

=== By wrestler ===
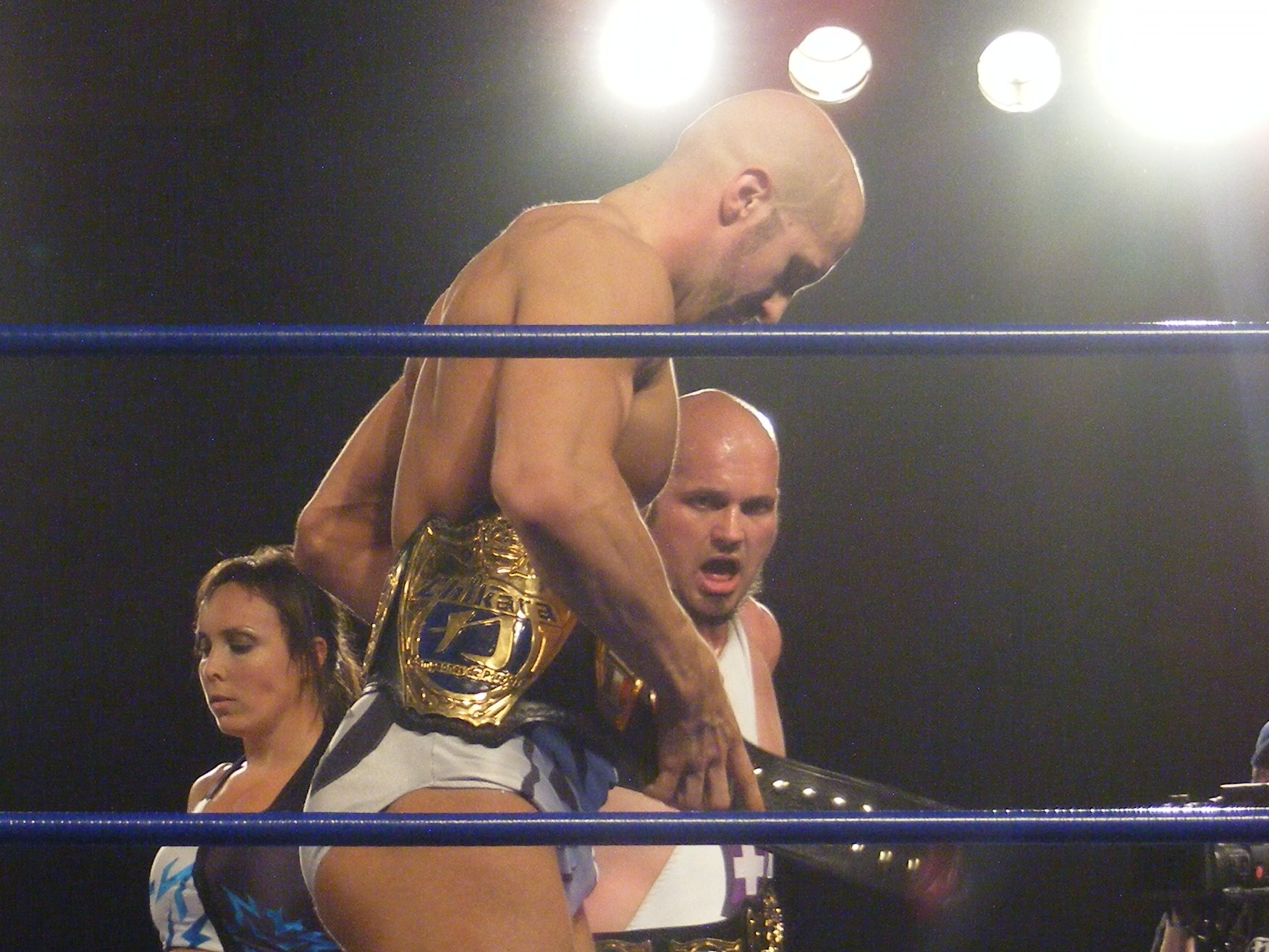
Record-tying two-time champion, Claudio Castagnoli.

Rank	Wrestler	No. of reigns	Combined defenses	Combined days
1	Jigsaw	2	2	693
2	Claudio Castagnoli	2	6	531
3	The Shard	1	0	413
4	Gran Akuma	1	3	343
4	Icarus	1	3	343
6	Delirious	1	5	331
6	Hallowicked	1	5	331
8	Amasis	1	3	329
8	Ophidian	1	3	329
10	Hype Rockwell	1	3	300
10	Race Jaxon	1	3	300
12	Blaster McMassive	1	3	295
12	Max Smashmaster	1	3	295
14	Rick Roland	1	2	294
14	Sloan Caprice	1	2	294
16	Mike Quackenbush	1	2	280
17	Ares	1	4	267
18	Chris Hero	1	2	264
19	Matt Jackson	1	3	253
19	Nick Jackson	1	3	253
21	El Hijo del Ice Cream	2	0	229
21	Ice Cream Jr.	2	0	229
23	Chuck Taylor	2	4	222
23	Johnny Gargano	2	4	222
25	Solo Darling	2	0	228
25	Willow Nightingale	2	0	228
27	Cornelius Crummels	1	2	189–216
27	Sonny Defarge	1	2	189–216
29	Travis Huckabee	2	1	196
29	Tony Deppen	2	1	196
31	Fire Ant	1	4	188
31	Soldier Ant	1	4	188
33	Scott Parker	2	2	148
33	Shane Matthews	2	2	148
35	Princess KimberLee	1	0	140
35	The Wisper	1	0	140
37	Dasher Hatfield	1	1	139
37	Mark Angelosetti	1	1	139
39	Trent Seven	1	0	116
39	Tyler Bate	1	0	116
41	Player Dos	1	0	28
41	Player Uno	1	0	28

== See also ==
- Chikara Grand Championship
- Chikara Young Lions Cup
