= Icarus (wrestler) =

American professional wrestler

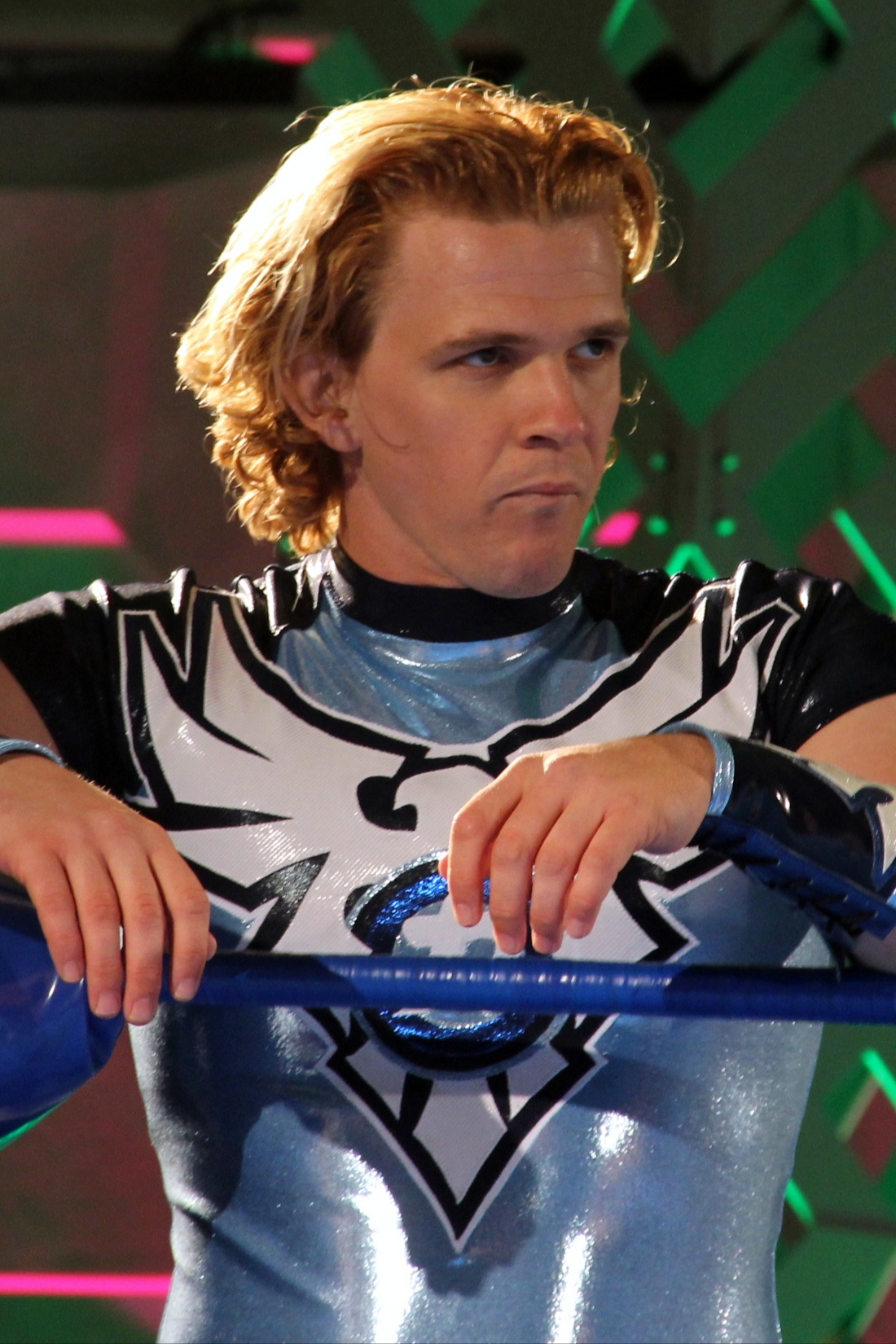
- Icarus in 2014

Personal information
- Born: Ronald Grams; July 26, 1982 (age 44) Pennsylvania, U.S.

Professional wrestling career
- Ring name(s): Icarus; Ichabod Slayne
- Billed height: 5 ft 10 in (1.78 m)
- Billed weight: 182 lb (83 kg)
- Billed from: Mount Olympus
- Trained by: Mike Quackenbush; Reckless Youth
- Debut: May 25, 2002

Ronald Grams (born July 26, 1982) is an American professional wrestler. He is known for his 18-year tenure with the Chikara professional wrestling promotion, where he debuted under the name Ichabod Slayne in 2002 before changing it to Icarus in 2003, and he is a former Grand Champion, Campeon de Parejas and King of Trios winner. He has also wrestled for Combat Zone Wrestling, Dragon Gate USA, Evolve Wrestling, Independent Wrestling Association Mid-South and Pro Wrestling Guerrilla.

== Professional wrestling career ==
Grams received his initial training from Chikara founders Mike Quackenbush and Reckless Youth at the Chikara Wrestle Factory, where he was trained on the first term of the school alongside the likes of Hallowicked and UltraMantis Black. Grams and Hallowicked were childhood friends and entered the school with the intention of becoming a tag team.

=== Chikara ===
==== Night Shift (2002) ====
Grams made his professional wrestling debut on May 25, 2002, at Chikara's first ever show as Ichabod Slayne, a masked member of the rudo (bad guy) stable Night Shift, with partners Blind Rage and Hallowicked. In their first professional wrestling match, Slayne and Hallowicked were defeated by Beauty and the Beast (Marshal Law and Love Bug) in a tag team match. When Hallowicked began gaining success as a singles wrestler, Slayne and Blind Rage were left to represent Night Shift in the company's tag team division. However, it wasn't long before problems rose between the two, culminating on June 28, 2002, in a ten-man tag team match, where Blind Rage's misstep caused Slayne to be pinned and as a result he was forced to wear a dress. On November 16 Slayne surprised his tag team partner by appearing as a member of the opposing tecnico (good guy) team in an eight-man tag team match, where he, Mike Quackenbush, Love Bug and DJ Skittlez defeated Blind Rage, Eddie Kingston, BlackJack Marciano and Jigsaw, when Slayne pinned Rage. On December 7, 2002, Slayne and Blind Rage faced each other in a Mask vs. Hair match, which Rage managed to win and as a result Slayne was forced to unmask.

==== Team F.I.S.T. (2003–2004) ====
Slayne returned to Chikara, without his mask and now using the ring name Icarus, on March 29, 2003, defeating his former stable mate and the reigning Young Lions Cup Champion Hallowicked in a non-title match. Icarus received his shot at the Young Lions Cup on April 12, but was unable to dethrone Hallowicked. On June 13 Icarus defeated Hallowicked in another non-title match, this time contested under Sudden Death rules. On July 5, 2003, Icarus entered the first ever Tag World Grand Prix with a new tag team partner, the masked Gran Akuma, using the tag team name Team F.I.S.T. (Friends in Similar Tights). After defeating The Conundrum (Jigsaw and Rorschach) in the first round of the tournament, Icarus and Akuma were eliminated from the tournament by Icarus' former stable mates Hallowicked and Blind Rage of the Night Shift, who would go on to win the entire tournament. After the tournament Team F.I.S.T. began feuding with the Wildcards (Eddie Kingston and BlackJack Marciano). 2003 ended with the Wildcards taking advantage of a hairline fracture in Akuma's ankle and defeating Team F.I.S.T. in a No Disqualification match on October 18. In 2004 the feud evolved with Jigsaw joining the Wildcards to form the Toxic Trio, which led to Mike Quackenbush coming to the aid of Team F.I.S.T. The feud came to an end on May 22, 2004, at Chikara's third anniversary show, when Icarus, Akuma and Quackenbush defeated the Toxic Trio in an Ultimate Jeopardy match and as a result both of the Wildcards were shaved bald.

==== The Kings of Wrestling (2005–2007) ====
After a disappointing 2005 Tag World Grand Prix, where Team F.I.S.T. was eliminated in the second round and two draws and a loss against the tag team of Mister ZERO and Shane Storm, known collectively as Men@Work, Icarus and Akuma turned rudo by attacking Storm and ZERO after a match on May 20, 2005. The following day Chris Hero invited Icarus and Akuma to join him, Claudio Castagnoli and Arik Cannon in the stable known as The Kings of Wrestling. On July 22 Icarus entered the third Young Lions Cup tournament. After defeating Prophet in his first round match and Rorschach, Mickie Knuckles, Sabian, Arik Cannon and Ricky Reyes in the 6-way semifinal match, Icarus advanced to the finals of the tournament, where he was defeated by Shane Storm. On September 16 Icarus received a rematch for the Young Lions Cup, but was once again defeated by Storm. 2005 ended with Icarus witnessing at ringside how Storm defeated his tag team partner Gran Akuma in a Mask vs. Mask match.

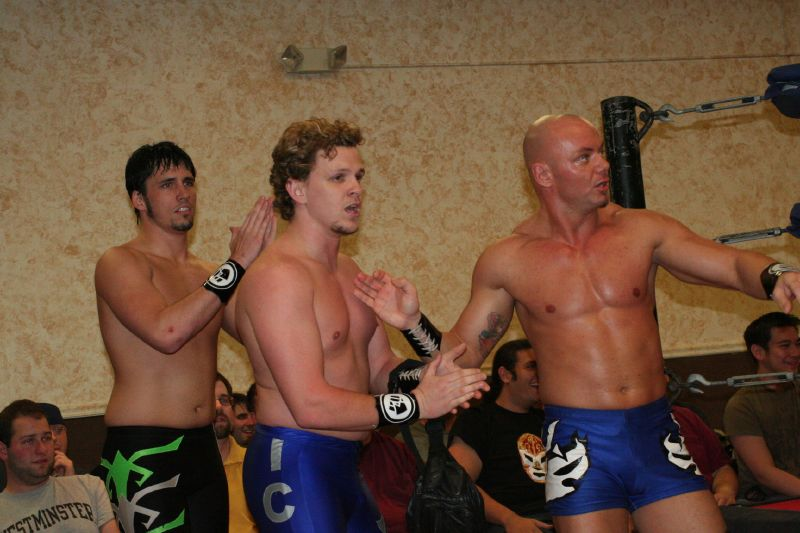
(Left to right) Chuck Taylor, Icarus and Gran Akuma of Team F.I.S.T.

In 2006, Icarus targeted Jigsaw and started going after his mask on multiple occasions, which led to Chikara Commissioner Bob Saget booking the two in a Hair vs. Mask match. On July 22, Jigsaw defeated Icarus and afterwards Jolly Roger and Mister ZERO, both of whom were in kayfabe forced to retire the previous year thanks to assaults from Icarus, returned to shave him bald. Icarus bounced back on October 28 by winning the third annual torneo cibernetico match. On November 12 Icarus and Akuma defeated the teams of Silver Bullet #1 and Silver Bullet #2, Incoherence (Delirious and Hallowicked) and Cheech and Cloudy in a one night tournament to earn the right to challenge for the Campeonatos de Parejas, held by their stablemates Chris Hero and Claudio Castagnoli. F.I.S.T. cashed in their title match at the following event on November 17 and defeated Hero and Castagnoli two falls to one to become the second ever Chikara Tag Team Champions. After the match, Icarus, Akuma and Hero kicked Castagnoli out of the Kings of Wrestling.

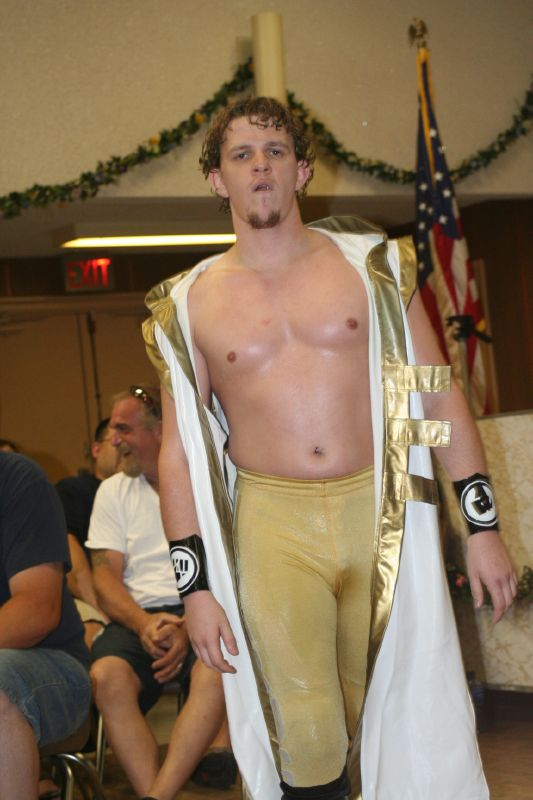
Icarus in June 2008

2007 began with Icarus and Akuma overthrowing Hero as the leader of the Kings of Wrestling, kicking him out of the stable and naming Chuck Taylor as their new third member. In February Icarus, Akuma and Taylor entered the first ever King of Trios tournament, where they made it all the way to the semifinals, before losing to the trio of KUDO, MIYAWAKI and Yoshiaki Yago, representing Kaientai Dojo. On May 27, 2007, at Chikara's fifth anniversary show, Icarus, Akuma and Taylor clashed heads with Chris Hero, Larry Sweeney and Claudio Castagnoli, who had been forced to re-join Hero after losing a match to him the previous month, over the rights to the name Kings of Wrestling. Icarus, Akuma and Taylor won the match, when Akuma pinned Sweeney, but after the match all six members decided to put their differences aside and united to re-form the Kings of Wrestling. During the rest of the year, the six were also joined by Mitch Ryder, Shayne Hawke and Max Boyer. F.I.S.T. then began a feud with Los Ice Creams (El Hijo del Ice Cream and Ice Cream Jr.), which culminated in the fourth torneo cibernetico match, where the Kings of Wrestling (Icarus, Ryder, Hero, Castagnoli, Sweeney, Akuma, Taylor and Hawke) faced Team Mega Mucha Lucha (Lince Dorado, Incognito, Magno, Equinox, El Hijo del Ice Cream, Ice Cream Jr., Chiva III and Chiva IV). The Kings of Wrestling easily defeated Team Mega Mucha Lucha, but in the end Castagnoli emerged as the sole winner of the match by defeating both Hero and Ryder and as a result won his freedom from the stable. The following month at Bruised Icarus and Chuck Taylor, who replaced the injured Gran Akuma in the title match, lost the Campeonatos de Parejas to Incoherence (Delirious and Hallowicked), ending their reign at 343 days. The Kings of Wrestling disbanded in December, when Castagnoli defeated Hero in a feud ending match, after which Hero left the company and the rest of the Kings broke off into two separate trios; F.I.S.T. (Icarus, Akuma and Taylor) and the Fabulous Three (Sweeney, Ryder and Hawke).

==== Chikara's most dangerous trio (2008–2010) ====
In March 2008, F.I.S.T. entered the 2008 King of Trios, where they defeated Sweet 'n' Sour Inc. (Bobby Dempsey, Sara Del Rey and Tank Toland) and Da Soul Touchaz (Acid Jaz, Marshe Rockett and Willie Richardson), advancing to the quarterfinals of the tournament, before losing to The Colony (Fire Ant, Soldier Ant and Worker Ant). After defeating The Colony in a rematch during Chikara's sixth anniversary weekend, Icarus, Akuma and Taylor dubbed themselves "Chikara's most dangerous trio" and defeated trios like Sami Callihan, Steve Weiner and Ultimo Breakfast, Lince Dorado, Chiva II and Chiva III, Player Uno, Player Dos and Ultimo Breakfast and Lince Dorado, Angel de Fuego and Chiva II to prove their point.

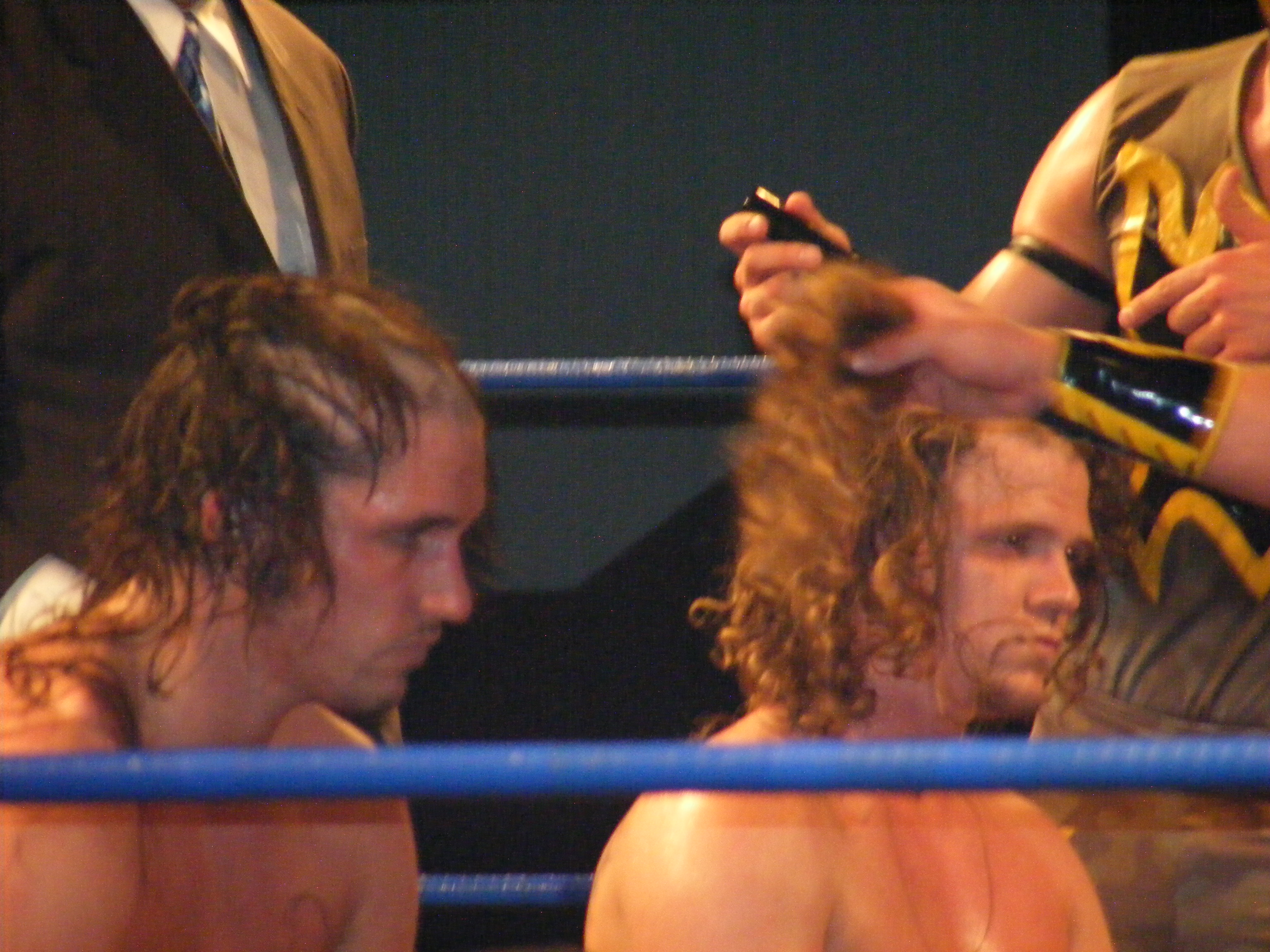
Chuck Taylor and Icarus having their heads shaved after losing a Double Mask vs. Double Hair match against The Colony

On February 20, 2009, F.I.S.T. squared off once more with The Colony, this time in a 2009 King of Trios qualifying match. F.I.S.T. won the match, when Icarus pinned Worker Ant. After the match Taylor planted Worker Ant on the floor of the arena with the Awful Waffle; in kayfabe this was used to explain Worker Ant's retirement from professional wrestling following the match. On March 27 F.I.S.T. entered their third King of Trios, defeating The Death Match Kings (Brain Damage, Necro Butcher and Toby Klein) in the first round of the tournament. After defeating The F1rst Family (Arik Cannon, Darin Corbin and Ryan Cruz) in the quarter-finals, F.I.S.T. advanced to the semifinals of the tournament, where they would defeat the team of Equinox, Lince Dorado and Helios, the team known collectively as The Future is Now. On March 29, 2009, F.I.S.T. defeated Team Uppercut (Bryan Danielson, Claudio Castagnoli and Dave Taylor) in the finals, when Taylor forced Danielson to tap out, to win the 2009 King of Trios and solidify their spot as the top trio in Chikara. With the King of Trios over, Fire Ant and Soldier Ant of The Colony challenged F.I.S.T. to a match, in an attempt to avenge their fallen partner, but ended up once again being one upped, when Icarus and Taylor defeated them on April 25, following a low blow. After the match Chikara Director of Fun Leonard F. Chikarason booked the two teams to end their feud in a Double Mask vs. Double Hair match at Chikara's seventh anniversary show. On May 24, 2009, at Aniversario Yang F.I.S.T. ended their feud with The Colony, when Icarus and Taylor lost a Double Mask vs. Double Hair match against Fire Ant and Soldier Ant, and were both shaved bald.

During the rest of 2009, Icarus and Akuma managed to pick up the three points needed in order to challenge for the Campeonatos de Parejas, held by Fire Ant and Soldier Ant, and during Chikara's winter break announced that they would be cashing in their title match on January 30, 2010, at the season nine premiere, titled A Touch of Class. Icarus and Akuma would however be defeated in the title match two falls to one. On April 23 F.I.S.T. entered the 2010 King of Trios tournament, attempting to become the first two-time King of Trios winners. After defeating The Throwbacks (Dasher Hatfield, Sugar Dunkerton and Matt Classic) in the first round, F.I.S.T. was eliminated in the quarter-finals by Team Osaka Pro (Atsushi Kotoge, Daisuke Harada and Tadasuke). During the tournament F.I.S.T. was observed by Johnny Gargano, a self-admitted fan of the team, who managed to stir up problems between its members by suggesting that the team had a weak link, which led to Taylor, who had been pinned in the match against Osaka Pro, pointing out Akuma and Akuma retaliating by claiming that Icarus was and always had been the weak link. On July 26 at Chikarasaurus Rex: King of Show, F.I.S.T. was defeated in a six-man tag team match by CIMA, Masaaki Mochizuki and Super Shenglong, when CIMA pinned Akuma. After the match Icarus and Taylor turned on Akuma, kicked him out of both F.I.S.T. and Chikara and gave his spot in the stable to Johnny Gargano.

==== The new F.I.S.T. (2010–2013) ====
With Gargano as a member, the new F.I.S.T. ended their losing streak by defeating Da Soul Touchaz (Acid Jaz, Marshe Rockett and Willie Richardson) and 3.0 (Scott Parker and Shane Matthews) and Soldier Ant in six-man tag team matches on September 18 and 19. On September 28 UltraMantis Black announced that he had recruited Icarus to join his team of Chikara originals, consisting of both rudos and tecnicos, who would face the rudo stable Bruderschaft des Kreuzes in the seventh annual torneo cibernetico match on October 23. As a sign of unity between the Chikara originals, Icarus entered the match wearing his old Ichabod Slayne mask. He was eliminated from the match by BDK's Tim Donst. On April 15, 2011, F.I.S.T. entered the 2011 King of Trios, defeating Team Australia (Kabel, Percy T and Tama Williams) in their first round match. The following day F.I.S.T. defeated Team Osaka Pro (Atsushi Kotoge, Daisuke Harada and Ultimate Spider Jr.), avenging their loss from the previous year and advancing to the semifinals of the tournament. On April 17, F.I.S.T. scored a major upset in the semifinals of the King of Trios tournament by defeating Team Michinoku Pro (Dick Togo, Great Sasuke and Jinsei Shinzaki), when Icarus rolled up Sasuke for the win, after Taylor had blinded him with powder. Later that same day, F.I.S.T. was defeated in the finals of the tournament by The Colony (Fire Ant, Green Ant and Soldier Ant). In May, Icarus made his first tour of Japan with Osaka Pro Wrestling. In Chikara, Icarus started a rivalry with Gregory Iron, who defeated him in back-to-back matches on June 25 and September 18, leading Icarus to publicly accuse Iron of faking his cerebral palsy. On October 30, Icarus replaced stablemate Johnny Gargano, who was unable to attend an event due to traveling issues, and teamed with Chuck Taylor to successfully defend the Chikara Campeonatos de Parejas against the Throwbacks (Dasher Hatfield and Sugar Dunkerton). Icarus and Gregory Iron had what was billed as their final match against each other on November 13 at Chikara's first ever internet pay-per-view, High Noon, where Icarus was victorious following a low blow. Afterwards, Icarus was chased out of the ring by the returning Gran Akuma. On January 28, 2012, Icarus and Akuma had their first match against each other, which ended in a double countout. On February 25, Icarus again replaced an injured Gargano and teamed up with Taylor to successfully defend the Campeonatos de Parejas against the Spectral Envoy (Hallowicked and UltraMantis Black). On March 24, Icarus and Taylor lost the title to 3.0. On June 2 at Chikarasaurus Rex: How to Hatch a Dinosaur, Icarus was defeated by Gran Akuma in a ladder match; as a result, Akuma earned a Chikara contract.

On August 2, Chikara's Director of Fun, Wink Vavasseur, named Sugar Dunkerton, who had announced his wish to join a stable, the fourth member of F.I.S.T. The other members, however, refused to accept Dunkerton as a full-fledged member, instead referring to him as their "water boy". On September 14, F.I.S.T., represented by Icarus, Gargano and Taylor, entered the 2012 King of Trios tournament, defeating Team Osaka Pro (Ebessan, Kikutaro and Takoyakida) in their first round match. The following day, F.I.S.T. defeated the all-female Team JWP (Command Bolshoi, Kaori Yoneyama and Tsubasa Kuragaki) to advance to the semifinals of the tournament. On the third and final day of the tournament, F.I.S.T. was eliminated from the tournament in the semifinals by the Spectral Envoy (Frightmare, Hallowicked and UltraMantis Black), who went on to win the entire tournament.

==== Tecnico turn; Grand Champion (2013–2015) ====
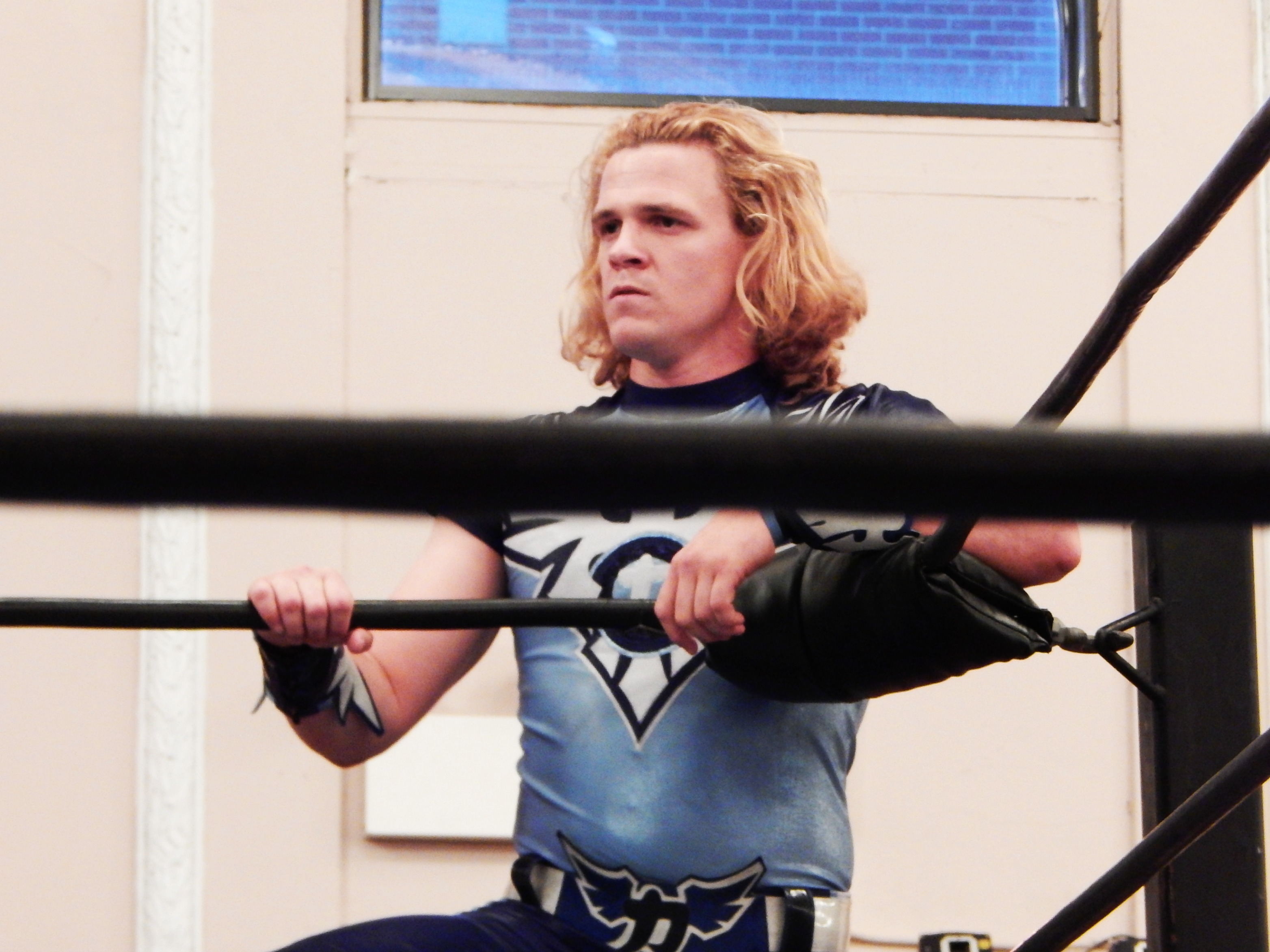
Icarus in June 2015

In early 2013, Icarus began showing signs of a tecnico turn, when he started having problems with F.I.S.T. stablemates Chuck Taylor and Johnny Gargano. On May 3, Icarus turned on Gargano, hitting him with a spear, after Gargano had attacked Dunkerton, blaming him for a six-man tag team match loss against Frightmare, Hallowicked and UltraMantis Black. The turn led to Gargano quitting F.I.S.T. The following day, Dunkerton also severed his ties with Icarus and F.I.S.T., when Icarus interfered in his match with Gran Akuma, causing a disqualification. On June 2 at Aniversario: Never Compromise, Icarus received his first shot at the Chikara Grand Championship, however, the match ended in a no contest, when the arena was attacked by a group known as "Condor Security" just as Icarus had Kingston locked in a submission hold. When Chikara went inactive following the event, Icarus began holding fan gatherings and spearheaded a petition for the return of the promotion. The storyline culminated on February 1, 2014, during the second National Pro Wrestling Day, when the Chikara roster defeated the Flood, a united group of rudos from Chikara's past, in a mass brawl, leading to Icarus announcing the promotion's return. On May 25 at Chikara's return event, You Only Live Twice, Icarus defeated Kingston in a rematch to become the second Chikara Grand Champion. Icarus made his first successful title defense on August 17 against Juan Francisco de Coronado. In September, Icarus teamed up with the reigning Campeones de Parejas Dasher Hatfield and Mark Angelosetti as the Golden Trio for the 2014 King of Trios. They made it all the way to the finals of the tournament, before losing to the Devastation Corporation (Blaster McMassive, Flex Rumblecrunch and Max Smashmaster). On October 26, Icarus defeated Flood representative Jimmy Jacobs for his second successful defense of the Grand Championship. Chikara's 2014 season culminated with Tomorrow Never Dies, where Icarus defeated Flood leader Deucalion in the promotion's second ever steel cage match. At the next season premiere on January 25, 2015, Icarus made his third successful defense of the Grand Championship against former F.I.S.T. stablemate Chuck Taylor. His fourth defense took place on March 8, when he defeated Nøkken. On April 6, during Chikara's tour of the United Kingdom, Icarus lost the Chikara Grand Championship to Hallowicked. Icarus received a rematch for the Grand Championship at the season 15 finale on December 5 in a three-way match also involving Eddie Kingston, but was defeated by Hallowicked.

==== The HeXed Men (2016) ====
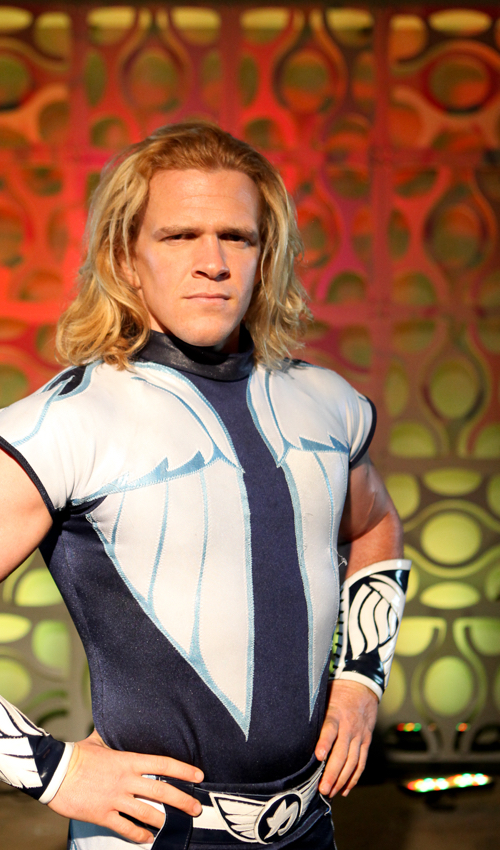
Icarus in February 2016

On May 7, 2016, Icarus entered a storyline, where his mind was taken over by UltraMantis Black, adding him to a new rudo group which also included Frightmare, Hallowicked, Kodama and Obariyon. As part of the new group, Icarus became a servant of an entity known as "Nazmaldun" and was dubbed "The Morning Star". On September 2, Icarus entered the 2016 King of Trios representing the new group, alongside stablemates Hallowicked and Jigsaw. They defeated Bullet Ant, Missile Assault Man and Worker Ant in their first round match. The following day, Icarus, Hallowicked and Jigsaw defeated Major League Moustache (Dasher Hatfield, Trent Seven and Tyler Bate) to advance to the semifinals of the tournament. On the third and final day of the tournament, Icarus, Hallowicked and Jigsaw were eliminated after being disqualified in their semifinal match against Team JWP (Command Bolshoi, Hanako Nakamori and Manami Katsu). On December 3, The HeXed Men lost to Chikara's Mightiest Heroes in a Torneo Cibernetico match. After the match, Ophidian took the Eye Of Tyr from UltraMantis Black, and only some of the HeXed Men were free from the spell.

=== Dragon Gate USA and Evolve (2009–2010) ===
On July 25, 2009, Icarus appeared on Dragon Gate USA's first pay-per-view Enter the Dragon in an eight-man tag team Chikara showcase match, where he, Gran Akuma, Amasis and Hallowicked were defeated by Mike Quackenbush, Jigsaw, Fire Ant and Soldier Ant.

On January 16, 2010, Icarus made his debut for Evolve Wrestling, at the promotion's first ever show, teaming with Gran Akuma and Brodie Lee as Akuma's Army, in a six-man tag team match, where they were defeated by Hallowicked, Frightmare and Mike Quackenbush.

== Championships and accomplishments ==
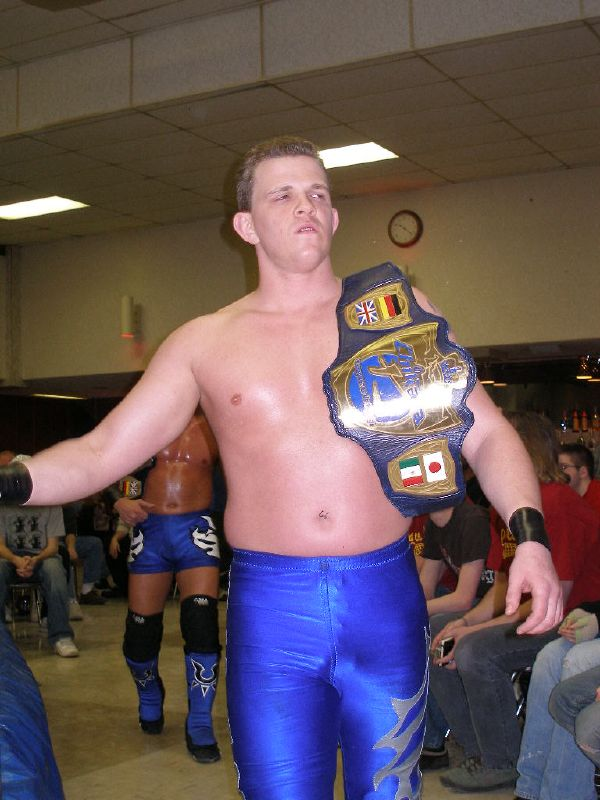
Icarus as one-half of Chikara's Campeones de Parejas

- Chikara
  - Chikara Campeonatos de Parejas (1 time) – with Gran Akuma
  - Chikara Grand Championship (1 time)
  - King of Trios (2009) – with Chuck Taylor and Gran Akuma
  - One Night Tag Team Tournament (2006)
  - Torneo Cibernetico (2006)
  - #1 Contendership Tag Team Tournament (2006) – with Gran Akuma
- Excellence Professional Wrestling
  - Excellence Championship (1 time)
  - CATender Tournament (2018)
- Pro Wrestling Entertainment
  - PWE Tag Team Championship (2 times) – with Gran Akuma
  - PWE Tag Team Championship Tournament (2005) – with Gran Akuma
- Pro Wrestling Illustrated
  - PWI ranked him #220 of the top 500 singles wrestlers in the PWI 500 in 2010

=== Luchas de Apuestas record ===
Winner (wager)	Loser (wager)	Location	Event	Date	Notes
Blind Rage (hair)	Ichabod Slayne (mask)	Allentown, Pennsylvania	Season 1 Finale	December 7, 2002	
Jigsaw (mask)	Icarus (hair)	Hellertown, Pennsylvania	The Crushing Weight of Mainstream Ignorance	July 22, 2006	
Fire Ant and Soldier Ant (masks)	Icarus and Chuck Taylor (hairs)	Philadelphia, Pennsylvania	Aniversario Yang	May 24, 2009	
