= DGUSA Enter the Dragon =

Professional wrestling pay-per-view event

Enter the Dragon / Open the Historic Gate is the first professional wrestling pay-per-view (PPV) event produced by Dragon Gate USA that was taped on July 25, 2009 at The Arena in Philadelphia, Pennsylvania and aired September 4, 2009.

Enter the Dragon was awarded Best Major Show of 2009 by Wrestling Observer Newsletter.

== Background ==
Enter the Dragon featured five professional wrestling matches that involved different wrestlers from pre-existing scripted feuds and storylines. Wrestlers were portrayed as either villains or heroes in the scripted events that build tension and culminated into a wrestling match or series of matches.

== Results ==
=== 2009 ===
Enter the Dragon 2009
- Promotion: Dragon Gate USA
- Date: July 25, 2009 (aired September 4, 2009)
- City: Philadelphia, Pennsylvania
- Venue: The Arena

Pay-per-view chronology
← Previous —	Next → Untouchable

Enter The Dragon chronology
← Previous —	Next → Enter The Dragon 2010

#	Results	Stipulations
Dark	Lince Dorado defeated Cheech, Cloudy, Johnny Gargano, Chris Jones, Louis Lyndon, Aaron Arbo, and Andy Harner	Fray
Dark	Too Cold Scorpio defeated Kenn Doane	Singles match
1	YAMATO defeated BxB Hulk	Singles match
2	The Colony (Fire Ant & Soldier Ant), Jigsaw and Mike Quackenbush defeated F.I.S.T. (Icarus & Gran Akuma), Amasis and Hallowicked	Eight Man Tag Team match
3	Dragon Kid defeated Masato Yoshino	Singles match
4	The Young Bucks (Matt and Nick Jackson) defeated Warriors-5 (CIMA and Susumu Yokosuka)	Tag team match
5	Naruki Doi defeated Shingo	Singles match

=== 2010 ===
Enter the Dragon 2010
- Promotion: Dragon Gate USA
- Date: July 24, 2010
- City: Philadelphia, Pennsylvania
- Venue: The Arena

Pay-per-view chronology
← Previous; Uprising 2010	Next → Untouchable 2010

Enter The Dragon chronology
← Previous; Enter The Dragon 2009	Next → Enter The Dragon 2011

#	Results	Stipulations
Dark 1	Lince Dorado vs Super Shenlong - Time Limit Draw	Singles match
Dark 2	Cheech & Cloudy defeated Rexx Reed & Tommaso Ciampa	Tag team Match
Dark 3	Jimmy Jacobs defeated Sami Callihan	Singles match
1	CIMA defeated Johnny Gargano	Singles match
2	Chuck Taylor defeated Ricochet, Arik Cannon & Adam Cole	Four Way Match
3	Naruki Doi defeated Drake Younger	Singles match
4	BxB Hulk defeated Masaaki Mochizuki	Dragon Gate Open the Freedom Gate
5	Rich Swann defeated Scott Reed	Singles match
6	Masato Yoshino, Mike Quackenbush, Jigsaw & Hallowicked defeated YAMATO, Akira Tozawa, Jon Moxley & Gran Akuma	8 Man Elimination Tag Team Match
7	Bryan Danielson defeated Shingo	Singles match

=== 2011 ===
Enter the Dragon 2011
- Promotion: Dragon Gate USA
- Date: June 5, 2011 (aired June 5, 2011)
- City: Manhattan, NY
- Venue: B.B. King's Blues Club & Grill

Pay-per-view chronology
← Previous; Uprising 2011	Next → Chasing The Dragon

Enter The Dragon chronology
← Previous; Enter The Dragon 2010	Next → —

#	Matches	Stipulations
1	Masato Yoshino defeated Ricochet	Singles match
2	A. R. Fox defeated Pinkie Sanchez	Singles match
3	Jon Davis defeated Tony Nese, Ahtu, Flip Kendrick, Louis Lyndon, Facade, Sugar Dunkerton, Caleb Konley, and Cedrick Alexander	FRAY!
4	Sami Callihan & Arik Cannon defeated Masaaki Mochizuki and Susumu Yokosuka	Tag Team match
5	Johnny Gargano & Chuck Taylor & Rich Swann defeated CIMA & Brodie Lee & Austin Aries	Trios match
6	YAMATO defeated PAC	Open The Freedom Gate Title Match
