= Gran Akuma =

American wrestler (born 1974)

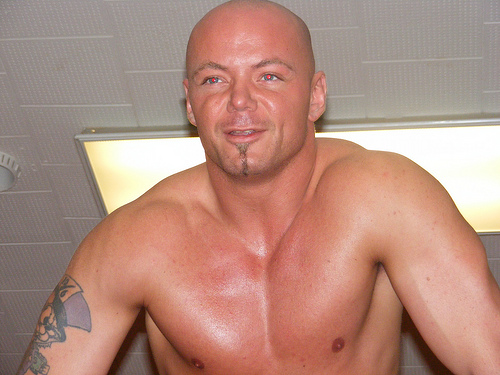
- Gran Akuma at a Chikara show in 2008

Personal information
- Born: December 20, 1974 (age 51) Boyertown, Pennsylvania, U.S.

Professional wrestling career
- Ring name(s): Gran Akuma; Akuma
- Billed height: 5 ft 9 in (1.75 m)
- Billed weight: 188 lb (85 kg)
- Billed from: Afar
- Trained by: Mike Quackenbush; Reckless Youth; Chris Hero; Skayde
- Debut: October 12, 2002
- Retired: February 16, 2018

Gran Akuma (born December 20, 1974) is an American retired professional wrestler, best known for his work in Chikara. He has also worked for Combat Zone Wrestling (CZW), Dragon Gate USA and Full Impact Pro (FIP). In Chikara, he was a member of The Kings of Wrestling stable, while also being a part of Team F.I.S.T. with Icarus and Chuck Taylor. On November 17, 2006, Akuma and Icarus defeated Chris Hero and Claudio Castagnoli to capture the Campeonatos de Parejas.

== Career ==
=== Chikara (2002–2010) ===
Gran Akuma debuted as a masked wrestler at a Chikara show on October 12, 2002, in Allentown, Pennsylvania and went on to take part in the inaugural Young Lions Cup later that year.

In 2003 Akuma found a tag team partner in Icarus, and they formed the babyface Team F.I.S.T. (Friends In Similar Tights). The team competed in the 2003 Tag World Grand Prix but were defeated in the semi-finals by The Night Shift (Blind Rage and Hallowicked). Team F.I.S.T then went on to feud with The Wildcards (Eddie Kingston and Blackjack Marciano), leading to an 'Ultimate Jeopardy' match at the 2004 Anniversario show. This match consisted of Team F.I.S.T and Mike Quackenbush vs The Toxic Trio (The Wildcards and Jigsaw) with various stipulations attached. As a result of these stipulations, after Akuma forced Kingston to submit, The Wildcards were shaved bald.

F.I.S.T. competed in the 2005 Tag World Grand Prix, but were eliminated after a second round loss to Claudio Castagnoli and Arik Cannon. In May 2005, the team turned heel for the first when they attacked Men@Work (Mister ZERO and Shane Storm) after losing a match against them. They then joined up with the Kings of Wrestling (Chris Hero, Claudio Castagnoli and Arik Cannon). This led to a vicious feud between Akuma and Storm, culminating in a "Mascara contra Mascara" match at "Running in the Red" in November which Akuma lost, forcing him to remove his mask.

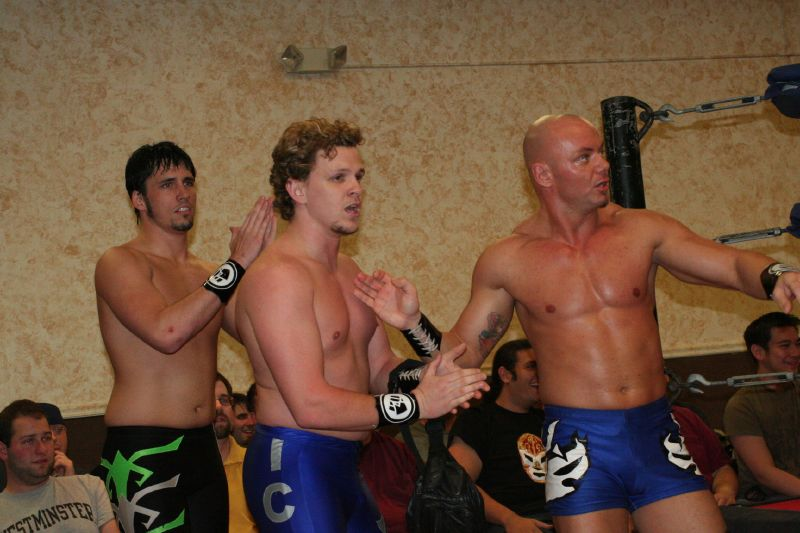
Team F.I.S.T. (from left to right: Chuck Taylor, Icarus, and Gran Akuma in May 2008

On November 17, 2006, at Brick, Team F.I.S.T. defeated their stablemates Chris Hero & Claudio Castagnoli for the Chikara Campeonatos de Parejas. Team F.I.S.T. held the titles until October 26, 2007, when they were defeated by Incoherence (Delirious and Hallowicked) at Chikara's "Bruised" event. Gran Akuma was injured and had to watch from ringside as his Team F.I.S.T. stablemate Chuck Taylor wrestled in his place.

Gran Akuma won the 2009 King of Trios tournament with his two partners Icarus and Chuck Taylor when they beat "Team Uppercut" (Bryan Danielson, Claudio Castagnoli and Dave Taylor) in the final during the "Night 3" of the event in March 2009.

On April 23, 2010, F.I.S.T. entered the 2010 King of Trios tournament, attempting to become the first two-time King of Trios winners. After defeating The Throwbacks (Dasher Hatfield, Sugar Dunkerton and Matt Classic) in the first round, F.I.S.T. was eliminated in the second round by Team Osaka Pro (Atsushi Kotoge, Daisuke Harada and Tadasuke). During the tournament F.I.S.T. was observed by Johnny Gargano, a self admitted fan of the team, who managed to stir up problems between its members by suggesting that the team had a weak link, which led to Taylor, who had been pinned in the match against Osaka Pro, pointing out Akuma and Akuma retaliating by claiming that Icarus was and always had been the weak link. Taylor caused even more dissension in F.I.S.T. by offering himself to Dragon Gate USA's World–1 stable, a competitor of Kamikaze USA, Gran Akuma's stable in the company. On July 26 at Chikarasaurus Rex: King of Show F.I.S.T. was defeated in a six-man tag team match by Cima, Masaaki Mochizuki and Super Shenglong, when Cima pinned Akuma. After the match Icarus and Taylor turned on Akuma, kicked him out of both F.I.S.T. and Chikara and gave his spot in the stable to Johnny Gargano.

=== Dragon Gate USA (2009–2010) ===
On July 25, 2009, Akuma appeared on Dragon Gate USA's first pay-per-view Enter the Dragon in an eight-man tag team Chikara showcase match, where he, Icarus, Amasis and Hallowicked were defeated by Mike Quackenbush, Jigsaw, Fire Ant and Soldier Ant. After the match Akuma turned on his fellow Chikara wrestlers Quackenbush and Jigsaw and joined Yamato's Kamikaze USA stable. On September 6 at the second PPV titled Untouchable Akuma and Yamato were defeated in a tag team match by Quackenbush and Jigsaw. On November 28 at the third PPV Freedom Fight Akuma entered the tournament to crown the first Open the Freedom Gate Champion and made it all the way to the finals, before losing the four-way match to BxB Hulk. Kamikaze USA continued its feud with Quackenbush and the Chikara Sekigun and on July 24 at the tapings of the Enter the Dragon 2010 pay–per–view, Kamikaze USA members Akuma, Yamato, Jon Moxley and Akira Tozawa were defeated in an eight-man elimination tag team match by Quackenbush, Jigsaw, Hallowicked and Masato Yoshino.

=== Combat Zone Wrestling (2010–2011) ===
After making several sporadic appearances for Combat Zone Wrestling (CZW) from 2004 to 2006, Gran Akuma returned to the promotion as a regular on November 13, 2010, at Night of Infamy 9: Betrayal, where he, billed simply as Akuma (stylized in all capital letters) defeated Kit Osbourne. On December 11 at Cage of Death XII Akuma defeated Alex Colon, Jonathan Gresham, Rich Swann, Ruckus and Ryan McBride in a six-way match to qualify for the Best of the Best X tournament. On April 9, Akuma was eliminated from the Best of the Best tournament in the first round by Zack Sabre Jr., ending his undefeated streak in CZW. He left CZW shortly thereafter.

=== Return to Chikara (2011–2013) ===
On November 12, 2011, Akuma made his return to Chikara, chasing former tag team partner Icarus from the ring as he was attacking Steve "The Turtle" Weiner. The following day at Chikara's first internet pay-per-view, High Noon, Akuma again tried to attack Icarus, after he had defeated Gregory Iron, but accidentally hit Iron instead. On January 28, 2012, Akuma and Icarus had their first match against each other, which ended in a double countout. Akuma was then put in a trial series to earn his way back to Chikara's roster, which built to a three-on-one handicap match on April 28, where Akuma defeated all three members of F.I.S.T. On June 2 at Chikarasaurus Rex: How to Hatch a Dinosaur, Akuma defeated Icarus in a ladder match to earn a Chikara contract. Afterwards, Akuma began regularly teaming with Scott Parker and Shane Matthews. On September 14, the three entered the 2012 King of Trios tournament, but were eliminated in their first round match by The Batiri (Kobald, Kodama and Obariyon).

He also made an appearance for Pennsylvania Premiere Wrestling on September 14, 2013, with a win over Eric Alverado.

== Championships and accomplishments ==
- Chikara
  - Campeonatos de Parejas (1 time) – with Icarus
  - King of Trios (2009) – with Icarus and Chuck Taylor
  - #1 Contendership Tag Team Tournament (2006) – with Icarus
  - One Night Tag Team Tournament (2006)
  - Torneo Cibernetico (2005)
- Full Impact Pro
  - FIP Florida Heritage Championship (1 time)
- National Wrestling Alliance
  - NWA Television Heavyweight Championship (1 time, current)
- New Age Wrestling Federation
  - NAWF Junior Heavyweight Championship (1 time)
- On Point Wrestling
  - Masters of the Mat Tournament (2015)
- Pro Wrestling Entertainment
  - PWE Tag Team Championships (2 times) - with Icarus
  - PWE Tag Team Trophy (2 times) – with Icarus
  - PWE Tag Team Championship #1 Contendership Tournament (2005)
- Pro Wrestling Illustrated
  - PWI ranked him #226 of the top 500 singles wrestlers in the PWI 500 in 2010

=== Luchas de Apuestas record ===
Winner (wager)	Loser (wager)	Location	Event	Date	Notes
Gran Akuma (hair)	BlackJack Marciano and Eddie Kingston (hair)	Emmaus, Pennsylvania	Chikara Aniversario 3: Dodging the Sophomore Jinx	May 22, 2004	
Shane Storm (mask)	Gran Akuma (mask)	Philadelphia, Pennsylvania	Running in Red	November 13, 2005	
