= Hallowicked =

American professional wrestler

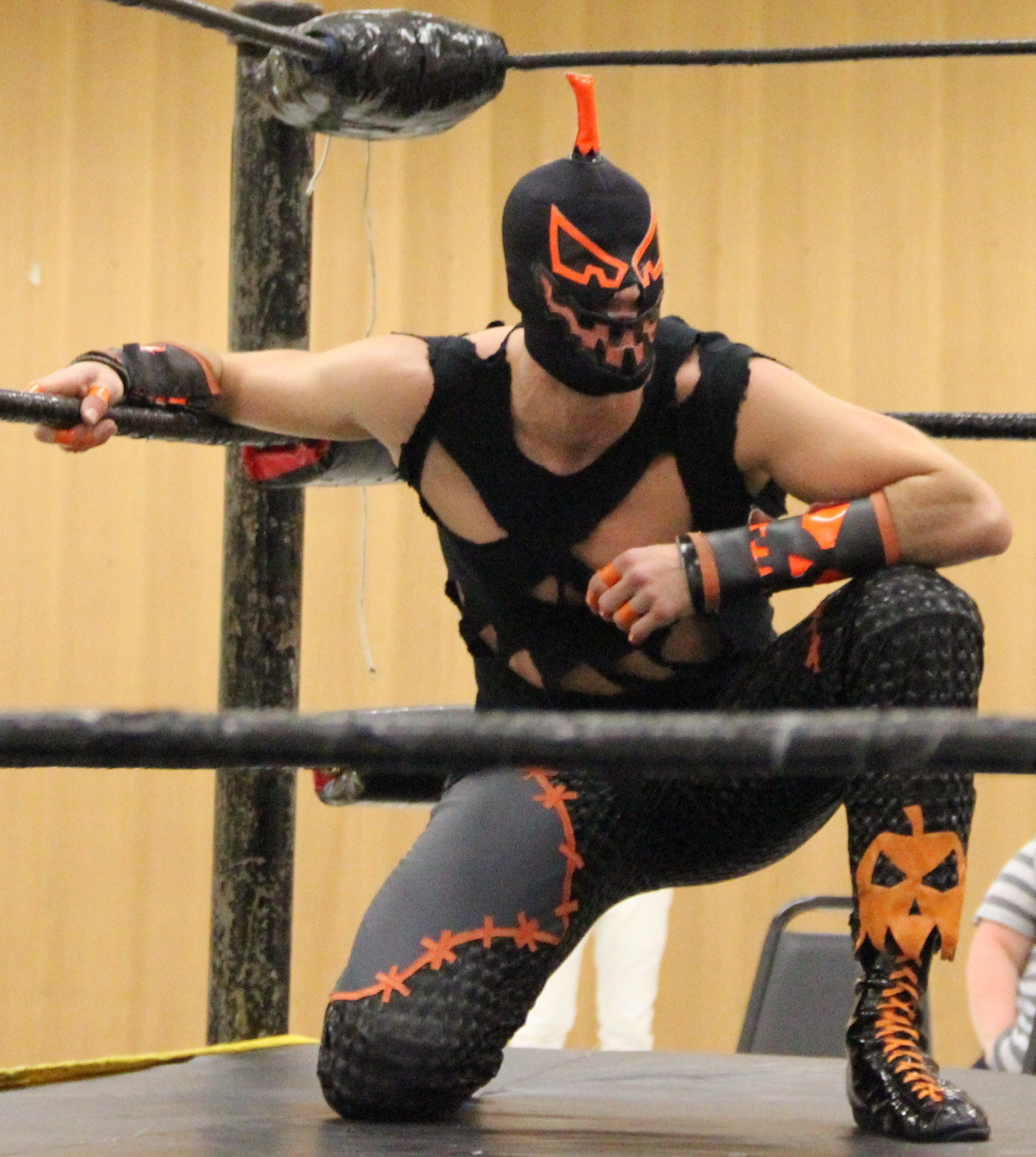
- Hallowicked in July 2013

Personal information
- Born: Robert Goodwin; November 1, 1981 (age 44) Pennsylvania, U.S.

Professional wrestling career
- Ring name: Hallowicked
- Billed height: 6 ft 2 in (188 cm)
- Billed weight: 212 lb (96 kg)
- Billed from: "Sleepy Hollow"
- Trained by: Mike Quackenbush; Reckless Youth; Chris Hero; Jorge "Skayde" Rivera
- Debut: May 22, 2002

Robert Goodwin (born November 1, 1981), better known by the ring name Hallowicked, is an American professional wrestler. He has performed primarily in the Chikara professional wrestling promotion, where he started his career in May 2002. His accomplishments in the promotion include becoming the inaugural Young Lions Cup Champion, a one-time Campeon de Parejas, a two-time Grand Champion and the winner of the 2003 Tag World Grand Prix and 2012 King of Trios tournaments. He served as an assistant trainer at The Wrestle Factory, operated by Chikara founder Mike Quackenbush. Throughout his career he has also worked for promotions such as Combat Zone Wrestling, Dragon Gate USA, Evolve Wrestling, Full Impact Pro, Jersey All Pro Wrestling, Pro Wrestling Guerrilla and Ring of Honor. He is known for his ghoulish looks and incoherent speech pattern.

== Professional wrestling career ==
=== Chikara (2002–2020) ===
==== Training ====
Hallowicked received his initial training from Chikara founders Mike Quackenbush and Reckless Youth at the Chikara Wrestle Factory, where he was trained on the first term of the school alongside the likes of UltraMantis Black and Icarus. Hallowicked and Icarus were childhood friends and entered the school with the intention of becoming a tag team.

==== Night Shift (2002–2003) ====
Hallowicked made his professional wrestling debut on Chikara's inaugural show on May 22, 2002, as a member of the three man rudo (bad guy) stable Night Shift, with partners Blind Rage and Ichabod Slayne. In their first professional wrestling match, Hallowicked and Slayne were defeated by Marshal Law and Love Bug in a tag team match. On the second show on May 31 Night Shift picked up their first victory in a six-man tag team match against Don Montoya and their trainers Mike Quackenbush and Reckless Youth. On November 9 Hallowicked entered Chikara's first ever Young Lions Cup tournament, a two-day tournament meant for wrestlers who had wrestled under 50 matches as a professional. After defeating DJ Skittlez in his first round match and Gran Akuma in the semifinals, Hallowicked advanced to the finals of the tournament, where he defeated Mister ZERO to become the first Young Lions Cup Champion.

After the tournament, Hallowicked decided to side with Blind Rage, when he and Ichabod Slayne had a falling-out. Slayne left the stable and spent the rest of the year feuding with Blind Rage. On April 12, 2003, Hallowicked successfully defended his Young Lions Cup against his former stable mate, who had lost his mask in a Hair vs. Mask match with Blind Rage and had renamed himself Icarus. On July 5 Hallowicked and Blind Rage entered Chikara's first ever Tag World Grand Prix. In the opening round of the tournament, they defeated Team IWA-MS (Brad Bradley and Jimmy Jacobs) and in the semifinals Team F.I.S.T. (Icarus and Gran Akuma). On July 26 Night Shift defeated Ultra/Zero (Mister ZERO and UltraMantis) in the finals of the tournament to win the first ever Tag World Grand Prix. Night Shift's success was not limited only to Chikara, as during this time they were also able to win North American Wrestling Federation's Tag Team Championship.

==== Dark Breed (2004–2005) ====
When Blind Rage left Chikara in October 2003, Hallowicked was forced to find himself a new tag team partner. In early 2004 he formed the tag team Dark Breed with the man he had defeated in the finals of the Tag World Gran Prix, who had turned on Mister ZERO and renamed himself UltraMantis Black. After four successful defenses of the Young Lions Cup and 602 days as the champion, Hallowicked was forced to relinquish the title in July 2004 in time for the second annual Young Lions Cup tournament. As a former champion Hallowicked was not allowed to enter the tournament or ever again challenge for the Cup. In October 2004 the Dark Breed joined Larry Sweeney's stable Sweet 'n' Sour International for the first annual torneo cibernetico match. After both Hallowicked and UltraMantis failed to win the match, the Dark Breed broke away from Sweeney's stable. When UltraMantis was sidelined with an injury, Hallowicked teamed with the returning Blind Rage in the 2005 Tag World Grand Prix. After defeating Eye Candy (DJ Skittlez and Private Eye), Hallowicked and Blind Rage were eliminated from the tournament by the SuperFriends (Mike Quackenbush and Chris Hero). The rest of the year Hallowicked feuded with Jigsaw, ending on November 13, when Jigsaw defeated him in a Two Out of Three Falls match.

==== Incoherence (2006–2010) ====
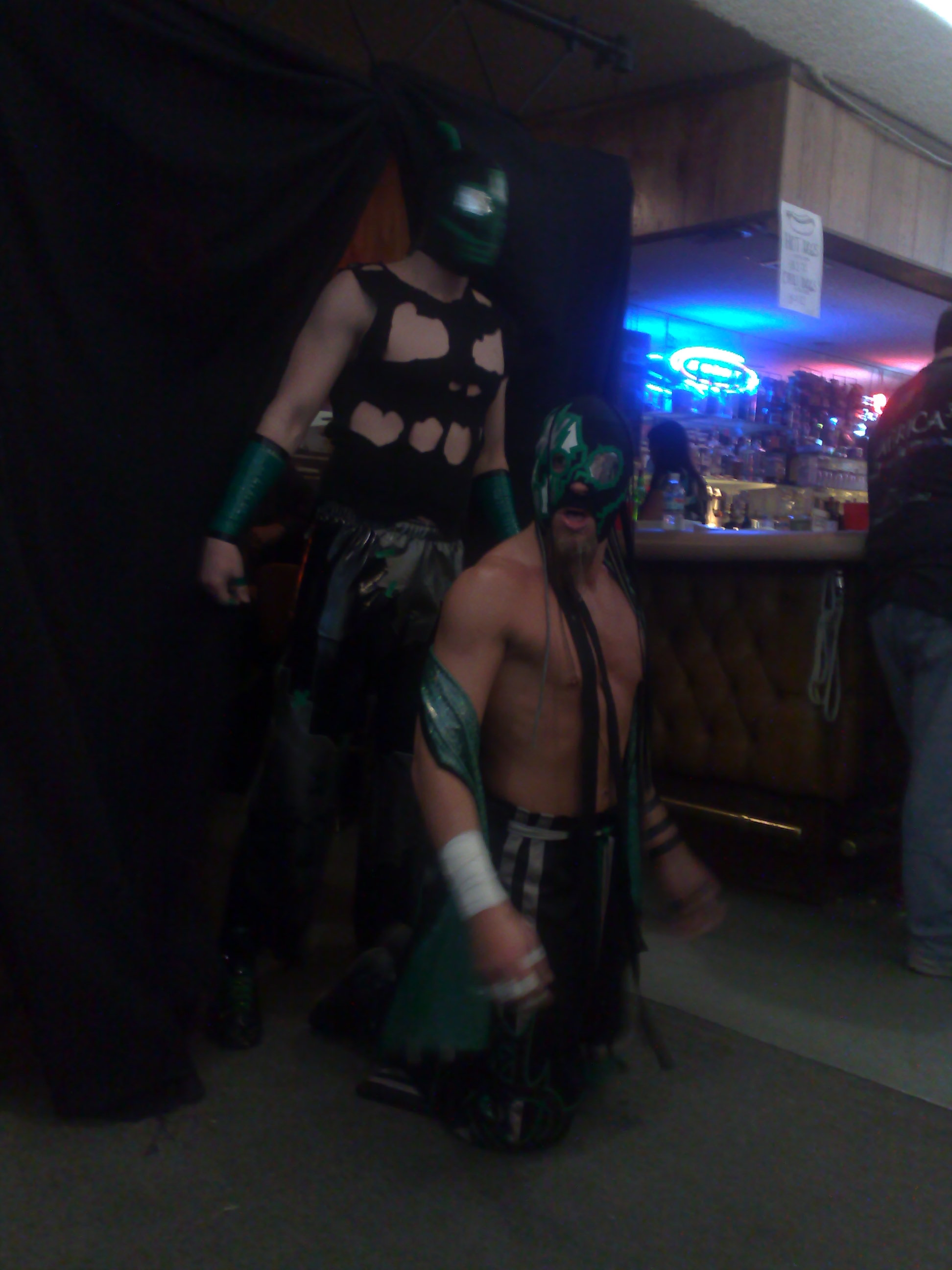
Incoherence making their entrance at Pro Wrestling Guerrilla's ¡Dia de los Dangerous! event

When UltraMantis Black suffered yet another injury, Hallowicked was left without a partner in the 2006 Tag World Grand Prix, which was this time contested for the brand new Chikara Campeonatos de Parejas (Tag Team Championship). A random draw picked Delirious as Hallowicked's new tag team partner and on February 24, the first night of the three night tournament, they defeated Crossbones and Rorschach in the first round and then the team of Cheech and Cloudy in the second round to advance to the quarterfinals of the tournament. Two days later Hallowicked and Delirious continued their impressive run as a tag team, by defeating Team DDT (Kudo and Mikami), before losing their semifinal match to the eventual winners of the entire tournament, The Kings of Wrestling (Chris Hero and Claudio Castagnoli). Hallowicked's apparent tecnico (good guy) turn did not sit well with UltraMantis Black as after the tournament he announced the death of the Dark Breed and declared a war on his former partner. Hallowicked and Delirious, the team now known as Incoherence, spent the rest of the year feuding with UltraMantis Black and his new stable the Order of the Neo-Solar Temple, which consisted of UltraMantis Black himself, Hydra, Crossbones and Hallowicked's first tag team partner, Blind Rage. Even though UltraMantis was able to pin Hallowicked in a singles match on September 22, Incoherence won the feud by defeating the Neo-Solar Temple first in a tag team match on November 17 and then in an eight-man tag team match, where they teamed with Cheech and Cloudy, on November 18.

In 2007 Hallowicked started a heated feud with Eddie Kingston, who was obsessed with being recognized as the best student to ever have come out of the Chikara Wrestle Factory and saw Hallowicked as his only threat at being recognized as such. During the course of the feud Hallowicked and Delirious managed to pick up the three points needed in order to challenge for the Campeonatos de Parejas on and October 26, 2007, they defeated Icarus and Chuck Taylor, who replaced the injured Gran Akuma in the title match, to end their record setting reign and become the new Champions. However, Hallowicked's year would end on a low note, as on November 18 Kingston defeated him in a Falls Count Anywhere match to win their feud.

After dominating Chikara's tag team division for almost a year, Incoherence lost the Campeonatos de Parejas on September 21 to the Super Smash Bros. (Player Uno and Player Dos). Incoherence holds the record for most successful Campeonatos de Parejas title defenses, with five. In late 2008 Hallowicked debuted a new protégé, Frightmare. The trio entered the 2009 King of Trios tournament, but were defeated in the first round by the Masters of a Thousand Holds (Mike Quackenbush, Jorge "Skayde" Rivera and Johnny Saint). In April UltraMantis Black revealed that he had not forgotten how Hallowicked had abandoned him in 2006, when he and Crossbones abducted Delirious following a match. Delirious would resurface the following month as a member of the Order of the Neo-Solar Temple, after being brainwashed by UltraMantis. On November 22 the two teams faced each other for the first time, with Delirious and UltraMantis coming out victorious, when UltraMantis pinned Frightmare.

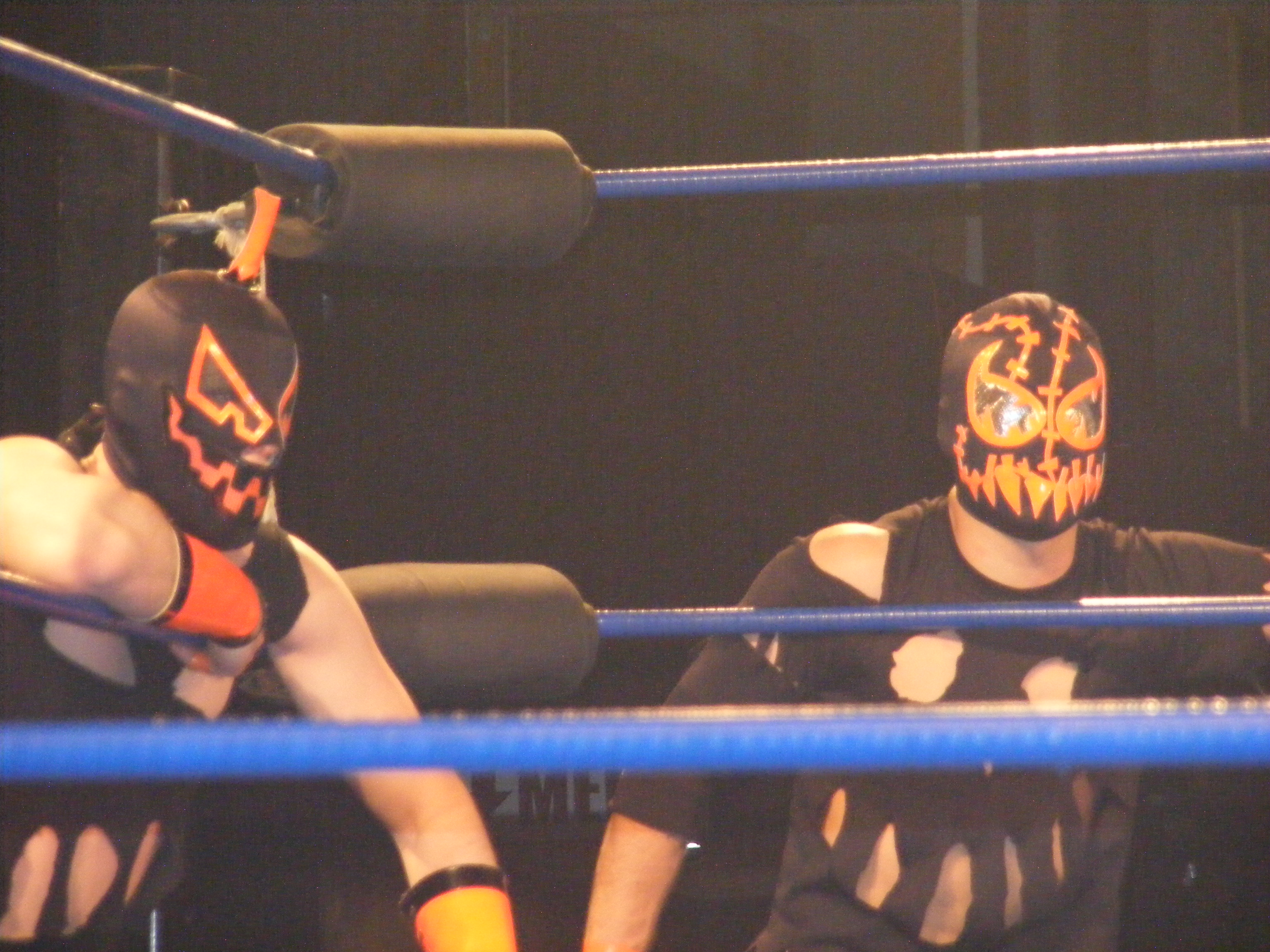
Hallowicked (left) and Frightmare in April 2010

In 2010 Incoherence began feuding with Bruderschaft des Kreuzes (BDK). The first match of the feud on February 28 ended when BDK members Sara Del Rey and Daizee Haze were disqualified for excessive punishment on Frightmare, giving Incoherence their first point in the process. For the 2010 King of Trios Hallowicked and Frightmare teamed with Mike Quackenbush to form Team Frightning. Despite their status as one of the favorites of the tournament, the team was eliminated in the first round by Team Big Japan Wrestling (Daisuke Sekimoto, Kankuro Hoshino and Yuji Okabayashi), when Okabayashi forced Frightmare to tap out. On the second night of the tournament, Hallowicked wrestled in a singles match, losing to the debuting Christopher Daniels. On the third and final night of the tournament Incoherence entered a ten tag team gauntlet match. During the match Incoherence eliminated first F.I.S.T. (Icarus and Gran Akuma), then the Order of the Neo-Solar Temple (UltraMantis Black and Crossbones) and finally Sara Del Rey and Daizee Haze of BDK to earn their second, third and fourth point respectively. After the tournament Chikara announced that Incoherence would challenge for the Campeonatos de Parejas, held by BDK's Claudio Castagnoli and Ares, on May 23 at Chikara's eighth anniversary show. At Aniversario Elf Incoherence was defeated in their title match in two straight falls, thanks to a pre-match assault from BDK's newest member Delirious and some shady officiating from the stable's own referee, Derek Sabato. On October 23 Hallowicked represented Chikara in the torneo cibernetico match, where the company's originals faced BDK. He was eliminated from the match by BDK member Tursas.

==== The Spectral Envoy (2010–2014) ====
On December 12, 2010, at the season nine finale, Reality is Relative, Hallowicked defeated UltraMantis Black in a singles match. After the match UltraMantis was attacked by Sinn Bodhi and his allies in The Batiri, but were eventually chased out of the ring by Incoherence, after Frightmare managed to convince Hallowicked to save his long–time rival. On April 15, 2011, Hallowicked, Frightmare and UltraMantis Black, now known collectively as the Spectral Envoy, were eliminated from the 2011 King of Trios in the first round by Team Dragon Gate (Akira Tozawa, KAGETORA and Super Shisa). The Spectral Envoy and the Dark Army (Sinn Bodhi, Kobald, Kodama and Obariyon) faced each other in an eight-man tag team match on September 18, when the former was joined by UltraMantis Black's former Order of the Neo-Solar Temple partner Crossbones. The Spectral Envoy managed to win the match, after Ultramantis pinned Bodhi. During 2011, Hallowicked also feuded with BDK member Tim Donst, which saw the two men captaining opposite teams in the eighth annual torneo cibernetico match on November 12, which was won by Team Hallowicked's Sara Del Rey. On November 13 at Chikara's first internet pay-per-view, High Noon, Hallowicked and UltraMantis Black put their masks on the line against Ares' Eye of Tyr and Donst's hair in a No Disqualification match. The match ended with UltraMantis pinning Ares, which meant that not only did he win back the Eye of Tyr, but he and Hallowicked also earned their third point and the right to challenge for the Campeonatos de Parejas. Hallowicked and UltraMantis cashed in their points on February 25, 2012, but were defeated by Chuck Taylor and Icarus of F.I.S.T., following interference from Delirious. Hallowicked's long rivalry with Tim Donst culminated in a Lucha de Apuestas Mask vs. Hair match on June 2 at Chikarasaurus Rex: How to Hatch a Dinosaur. Originally, Donst won the match after choking out Hallowicked, however, the match was restarted, when the referee of the match discovered that Donst had used a shoelace with the choke. After the restart, Hallowicked won the match and afterwards shaved his rival bald.

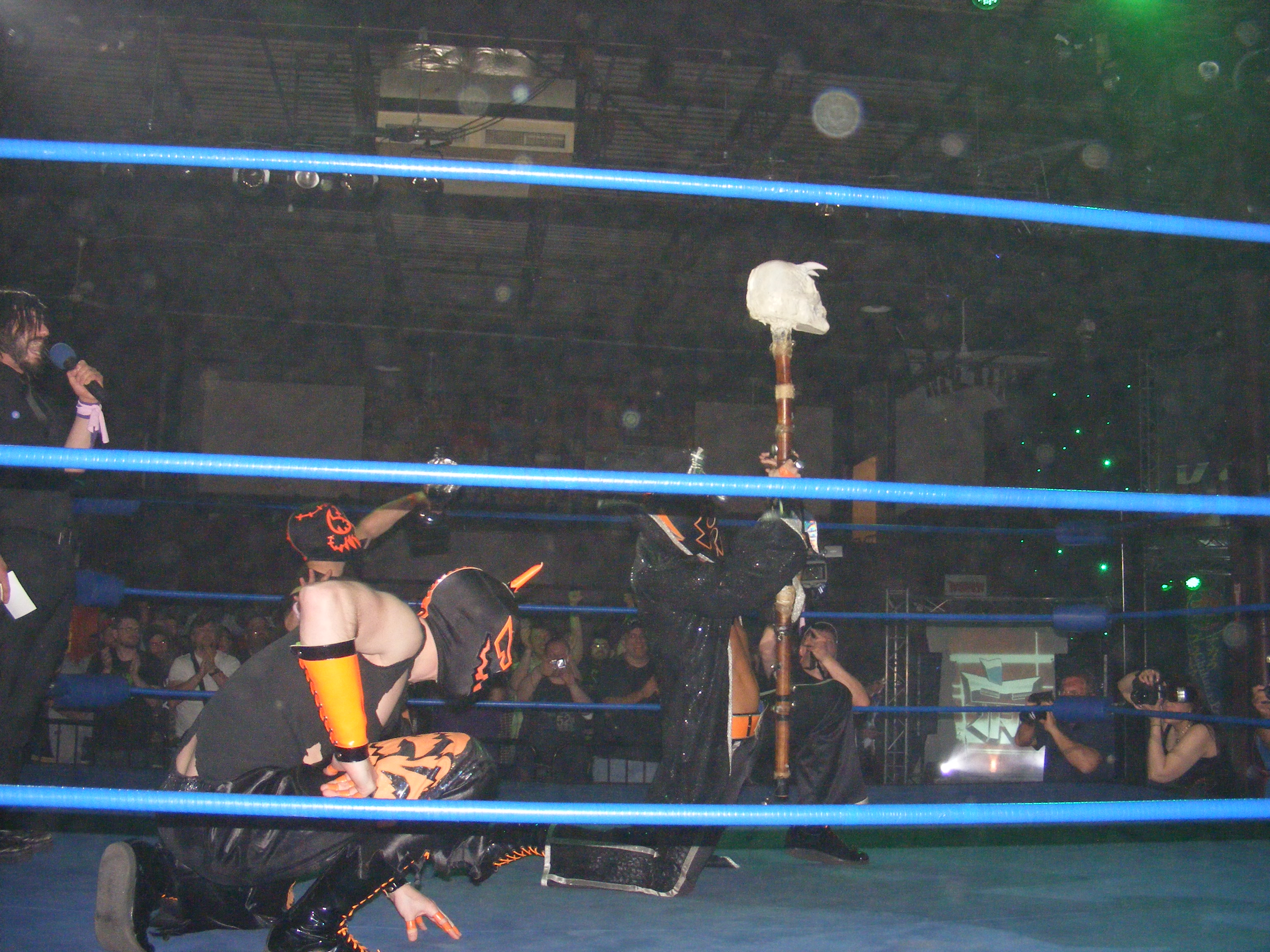
The Spectral Envoy in April 2011

On September 14, Hallowicked, Frightmare and UltraMantis Black entered the 2012 King of Trios, defeating Mihara, The Mysterious and Handsome Stranger and Tito Santana in their first round match. The following day, the Spectral Envoy advanced to the semifinals of the tournament, after defeating their rival team The Batiri. However, following the match, the Spectral Envoy was attacked by members of The Batiri and Ophidian. On the third and final day of the tournament, the Spectral Envoy first defeated F.I.S.T. (Chuck Taylor, Icarus and Johnny Gargano) in the semifinals and then Team ROH (Mike Bennett, Matt Jackson and Nick Jackson) in the finals, despite interference from The Batiri, Delirious and Ophidian, to win the 2012 King of Trios. At the following event on October 6, Hallowicked and UltraMantis Black defeated Los Ice Creams (El Hijo del Ice Cream and Ice Cream Jr.) to pick up their third point and earn the right to challenge for the Campeonatos de Parejas. They received their title shot on November 10, but were defeated by the defending Campeones, The Young Bucks (Matt Jackson and Nick Jackson), following interference from Ophidian and The Batiri. On December 2 at Chikara's third internet pay-per-view, Under the Hood, the Spectral Envoy, represented by Frightmare, Hallowicked, UltraMantis Black and the returning Blind Rage and Crossbones, defeated The Batiri, Delirious and Ophidian in a ten-man tag team match. On April 6, 2013, Hallowicked received his first shot at the Chikara Grand Championship, but was defeated by the defending champion, Eddie Kingston.

After a one-year hiatus, Chikara returned on May 25, 2014, with the You Only Live Twice internet pay-per-view. The Spectral Envoy worked the event's first match, where they were defeated by the new BDK of Ares, Nøkken and Tursas. On September 19, The Spectral Envoy entered the 2014 King of Trios as the defending tournament winners. They were, however, eliminated in their first round match by Eddie Kingston, Jimmy Jacobs and Volgar, representing Chikara's new top rudo stable The Flood, after their stablemate Deucalion brought out Delirious to attack UltraMantis. On December 6 at Tomorrow Never Dies, Delirious used the supposedly magical artifact Eye of Tyr to brainwash Hallowicked and Frightmare into turning against UltraMantis Black, breaking up the Spectral Envoy.

==== Nightmare Warriors and The HeXed Men (2015–2020) ====
When Chikara's season 15 started on January 25, 2015, Hallowicked and Frightmare worked as rudos, separated from UltraMantis Black. In addition to debuting a new look, Hallowicked also began speaking English in his interviews following the turn. Early in the year, Chikara started the Challenge of the Immortals tournament with Hallowicked appointed captain of one of the ten teams. In the draft, Hallowicked picked Frightmare, Blind Rage and Silver Ant for his team, named "Nightmare Warriors". On April 6, during Chikara's tour of the United Kingdom, Hallowicked defeated Icarus to become the third Chikara Grand Champion. With the win, Hallowicked became the first of only two wrestlers, the other being Mark Angelosetti, to have won every Chikara championship. He made his first successful title defense on May 24 against Ashley Remington. In September, Hallowicked, Frightmare and Silver Ant represented the Nightmare Warriors in the 2015 King of Trios, where they made it to the quarterfinals, before losing to eventual tournament winners, Team AAA (Aero Star, Drago and Fénix). At the season 15 finale on December 5, Hallowicked successfully defended the Grand Championship in a three-way match against Eddie Kingston and Icarus, the two previous Grand Champions. However, immediately afterwards, he was challenged by Princess KimberLee, who defeated him to become the new champion. On January 30, 2016, at the season 16 premiere, Hallowicked and Frightmare unsuccessfully challenged N_R_G (Hype Rockwell and Race Jaxon) for the Campeonatos de Parejas. On May 30, Hallowicked defeated Princess KimberLee in Glasgow, Scotland to become the first two-time Chikara Grand Champion. During the first half of 2016, Hallowicked formed a new rudo stable around himself, serving an entity known as "Nazmaldun". After Hallowicked used the Eye of Tyr to turn UltraMantis Black to his and Frightmare's side, the group expanded to also include Icarus, Kobald, Kodama, Mark Angelosetti and Obariyon. On September 2, Jigsaw debuted as the newest member of the group, teaming with Hallowicked and Icarus in the first round of the 2016 King of Trios tournament, where they defeated Bullet Ant, Missile Assault Man and Worker Ant. The following day, Hallowicked, Icarus and Jigsaw defeated Major League Moustache (Dasher Hatfield, Trent Seven and Tyler Bate) to advance to the semifinals of the tournament. On the third and final day of the tournament, Hallowicked, Icarus and Jigsaw were eliminated after being disqualified in their semifinal match against Team JWP (Command Bolshoi, Hanako Nakamori and Manami Katsu). The season concluded on December 3 with Hallowicked leading his stable to the 2016 torneo cibernetico. He lasted to the end of the match, but was finally defeated by Dasher Hatfield. Following the match, Ophidian stole the Eye of Tyr from UltraMantis Black, releasing him from under its spell. On July 24, 2020, Hallowicked announced his resignation from Chikara and the Wrestle Factory, in light of the Speaking Out Movement.

=== Full Impact Pro and Ring of Honor (2006–2008, 2012) ===
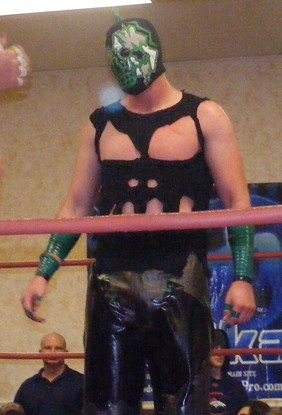
Hallowicked in November 2008

On December 15, 2006, Hallowicked made his debut for Florida-based Full Impact Pro (FIP) in a tag team match, where he and Gran Akuma defeated DP Associates (Delirious and Shingo). The following day Hallowicked won the 2006 Florida Rumble to earn a shot at the FIP World Heavyweight Championship. He received his shot later that night, but was defeated by the defending champion Roderick Strong. Hallowicked returned to the company in February 2007, losing to Shingo and Seth Delay in singles matches.

On April 27, 2007, Hallowicked, along with fellow Chikara wrestlers Mike Quackenbush, Jigsaw and Gran Akuma, made their debuts for FIP's sister promotion Ring of Honor (ROH). The four of them competed in a four-team Ultimate Endurance match, which was won by the Briscoe Brothers. The following day Delirious won a six-way match competed between the Chikara foursome and Pelle Primeau.

In June Hallowicked made two more appearances for FIP, losing to Jigsaw and Jimmy Rave in singles matches. The following month Hallowicked returned to ROH, losing to Matt Sydal in a singles match, before entering the Race to the Top tournament, where he was defeated in the first round by the eventual winner of the entire tournament, Claudio Castagnoli.

In September 2007 Hallowicked returned one more time to FIP, teaming with Scott Commodity in a tag team match, where they were defeated by The Irish Airborne (Dave and Jake Crist) on September 28, and teaming with Delirious and Jigsaw in a six-man tag team match, where they were defeated by Jack Evans, BxB Hulk and Yamato on September 29. He has not appeared for the company since. After not appearing for ROH for a year, Hallowicked returned to the company on October 25, 2008, in a six-way match, which was won by Davey Richards.

On January 20, 2012, Hallowicked returned to ROH at an event in Philadelphia, where he and Jigsaw, supported by several Chikara wrestlers including Mike Quackenbush and UltraMantis Black, defeated the Briscoe Brothers to earn a shot at the ROH World Tag Team Championship. Hallowicked and Jigsaw received their title opportunity on April 28, but were unable to dethrone the Briscoe Brothers in a rematch.

=== Dragon Gate USA (2009–2010) ===
On July 25, 2009, Hallowicked made his debut for Dragon Gate USA, at the promotion's first ever pay-per-view Enter the Dragon, teaming with Amasis and Team F.I.S.T. (Icarus and Gran Akuma) in an eight-man tag team match, where they were defeated by Mike Quackenbush, Jigsaw and The Colony (Fire Ant and Soldier Ant). On September 6 at the tapings of DGUSA's second PPV titled Untouchable, Hallowicked wrestled in a dark match, an eight-way match, won by Johnny Gargano. Hallowicked returned to PPV, on November 28 at Freedom Fight, where he entered the tournament to crown the first Open the Freedom Gate Champion, but was eliminated in the first round in a six-way match with Johnny Gargano, Lince Dorado, Matt and Nick Jackson and the winner of the match, Gran Akuma. On January 23, 2010, at the tapings of the fourth PPV, Fearless, Hallowicked wrestled in another dark match, unsuccessfully challenging Silas Young for the All American Wrestling Heavyweight Championship. Hallowicked returned to pay–per–view on July 24 at the tapings of Enter the Dragon 2010, where he teamed up with Mike Quackenbush, Jigsaw and the Open the Dream Gate Champion Masato Yoshino to defeat Kamikaze USA's Yamato, Gran Akuma, Akira Tozawa and Jon Moxley in an eight-man elimination tag team match.

=== Evolve (2010) ===
On January 16, 2010, Hallowicked made his debut for Evolve Wrestling, at the promotion's first ever show, teaming with Frightmare and Mike Quackenbush as the Chikara Sekigun in a six-man tag team match, where they defeated Akuma's Army (Gran Akuma, Icarus and Brodie Lee). He would still with the company until July 2010, working the first four shows of the company in multi-man matches.

He wrestled at Lucha Libre and Laughs in Denver, Co in May 2024 alongside Frightmare

== Championships and accomplishments ==
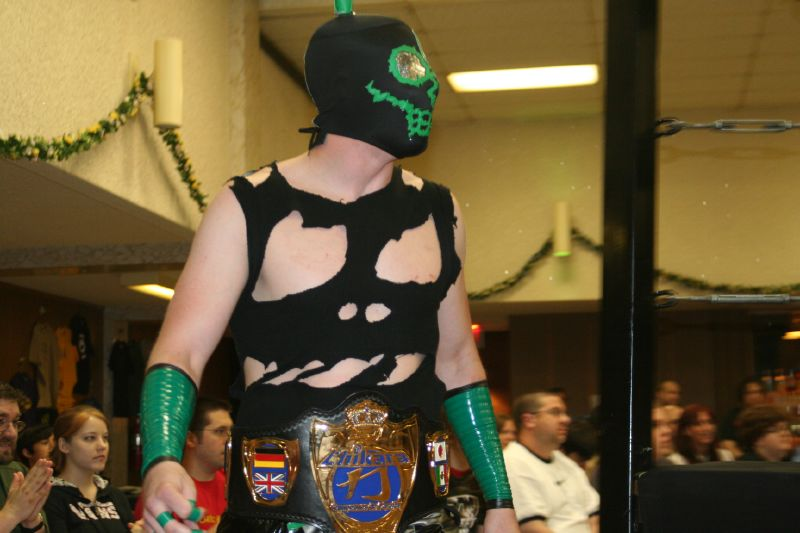
Hallowicked as Campeon de Parejas

- Blitzkrieg! Pro
  - B!P Tag Team Championship (2 times) – with Frightmare
- Chikara
  - Chikara Campeonatos de Parejas (1 time) – with Delirious
  - Chikara Grand Championship (2 times)
  - Chikara Young Lions Cup (1 time)
  - Infinite Gauntlet (2016)
  - King of Trios (2012) – with Frightmare and UltraMantis Black
  - Tag World Grand Prix (2003) – with Blind Rage
- Excellence Professional Wrestling
  - Excellence Championship (1 time)
  - Excellence Championship Tournament (2017)
- Full Impact Pro
  - Florida Rumble (2006)
- Independent Wrestling Association Deep South
  - IWA Deep South Heavyweight Championship (1 time)
- North American Wrestling Federation
  - NAWF Tag Team Championship (2 times) – with Blind Rage (1), Nocturne (1)
- Pro Wrestling Entertainment
  - PWE Tag Team Championship (2 times) – with Mike Quackenbush
- Pro Wrestling Illustrated
  - PWI ranked him #240 of the top 500 singles wrestlers in the PWI 500 in 2012
- WrestleJam
  - WrestleJam Championship (1 time)
  - WrestleJam Title Tournament (2013)

== Luchas de Apuestas record ==
Winner (wager)	Loser (wager)	Location	Event	Date	Notes
Hallowicked (mask)	Tim Donst (hair)	Philadelphia, Pennsylvania	Chikarasaurus Rex: How to Hatch a Dinosaur	June 2, 2012	
