= DGUSA Untouchable =

Professional wrestling event series

DGUSA Untouchable was a professional wrestling event series produced by Dragon Gate USA from 2009-2011. The events involved different wrestlers from pre-existing scripted feuds and storylines. Wrestlers were portrayed as either villains or heroes in the scripted events that build tension and culminate into a wrestling match or series of matches.

As part of Dragon Gate USA's talent exchange agreement with independent promotion, Chikara, wrestlers from either company can work in either vicinity. At Enter The Dragon/Open the Historic Gate two months prior, Mike Quackenbush, after competing in an eight-man tag team match, came to the ring following his match to give a monologue, known as a promo, to the live crowd in attendance, only to be interrupted by rival from DGUSA, Yamato, leading to an assault, which saw Quackenbush's ally, Jigsaw, come to his aide, which prompted Gran Akuma, to interfere himself, aiding Yamato; this prompted a tag team match between the two respective alliances at Untouchable.

Another match announced for the show was independent wrestler Bryan Danielson against Dragon Gate Open the Dream Gate Champion Naruki Doi, who is often deemed the "ace" of the company's Japanese counterpart. This would be one of Danielson's last matches on the independent circuit before signing with World Wrestling Entertainment (WWE). Conversely, Brian Kendrick was recently released from WWE, and made one of his first appearances back on the independent circuit against CIMA.

== Results ==
=== 2009 ===
Untouchable 2009
- Promotion: Dragon Gate USA
- Date: September 6, 2009 (aired November 6, 2009)
- City: Chicago, Illinois
- Venue: Congress Theater

Pay-per-view chronology
← Previous; Enter The Dragon	Next → Freedom Fight

Untouchable chronology
← Previous —	Next → Untouchable 2010

Untouchable / Open The Untouchable Gate was a professional wrestling pay-per-view (PPV) event produced by Dragon Gate USA that was taped September 6, 2009 at the Congress Theater in Chicago, Illinois and aired on November 6, 2009.

#	Results	Stipulations
Dark	Johnny Gargano defeated Arik Cannon, Flip Kendrick, Hallowicked, Mustafa Ali, Great Malaki, Louis Lyndon and Shiima Xion	Fray
1	Dragon Kid defeated Masato Yoshino	Singles match
2	Mike Quackenbush and Jigsaw defeated YAMATO and Gran Akuma	Tag team match
3	Naruki Doi defeated Bryan Danielson	Singles match
4	CIMA defeated Brian Kendrick	Singles match
5	Davey Richards defeated Shingo	Singles match
6	Real Hazard (Ryo Saito and Genki Horiguchi) defeated The Young Bucks (Nick and Matt Jackson)	Tag Team match

=== 2010 ===
Untouchable 2010
- Promotion: Dragon Gate USA
- Date: September 25th, 2010 (aired November 12, 2010)
- City: Chicago, Illinois
- Venue: Congress Theater

Pay-per-view chronology
← Previous; Enter The Dragon 2010	Next → Way Of The Ronin

Untouchable chronology
← Previous; Untouchable 2009	Next → Untouchable 2011

Untouchable / Open The Untouchable Gate was a professional wrestling pay-per-view (PPV) event produced by Dragon Gate USA that was taped September 25, 2010 at the Congress Theater in Chicago, Illinois and aired on November 12, 2010.

#	Results	Stipulations
1	BxB Hulk defeated Mike Quackenbush, Akira Tozawa	3Way Match
2	Brodie Lee and Jigsaw defeated Da Soul Touchaz	Handicap Match
3	Shingo defeated Dragon Kid	Singles match
4	Jon Moxley defeated Jimmy Jacobs	Chicago Street Fight match
5	Chuck Taylor defeated Drake Younger, Johnny Gargano, Rich Swann	Four Way Freestyle match
6	CIMA & Ricochet defeated Masato Yoshino & Naruki Doi	Tag Team match
7	Bryan Danielson defeated YAMATO	Singles match

=== 2011 ===
Untouchable 2011
- Promotion: Dragon Gate USA
- Date: September 10th, 2011 (aired September 10th, 2011)
- City: Chicago, Illinois
- Venue: Congress Theater

Pay-per-view chronology
← Previous; Chasing The Dragon	Next → Way Of The Ronin 2011

Untouchable chronology
← Previous; Untouchable 2010	Next → —

Untouchable / Open The Untouchable Gate was a professional wrestling pay-per-view (PPV) event produced by Dragon Gate USA that was taped September 10, 2011 at the Congress Theater in Chicago, Illinois and aired live.

#	Results	Stipulations
Dark	Silas Young defeated Sugar Dunkerton, A. C. H., Facade, Gregory Iron, others	FRAY!
1	Caleb Konley & Scott Reed defeated Alex Castle & Matt Cage	Tag Team Discovery match
2	Jon Davis defeated Rich Swann	Singles match
3	PAC defeated Ricochet	Singles match
4	A. R. Fox & Sabu defeated Arik Cannon & Pinkie Sanchez	Tag Team match
5	Johnny Gargano defeated Akira Tozawa	Singles match
6	Sami Callihan defeated Naruki Doi, Chuck Taylor (wrestler), Masato Yoshino	Stable Battle Four Way Scramble
7	YAMATO defeated CIMA	Open the Freedom Gate Championship match
