= Torneo cibernetico =

Professional wrestling match type

A torneo cibernetico is a multi-man professional wrestling elimination match that was created and primarily used in Mexican lucha libre professional wrestling promotions, especially in Consejo Mundial de Lucha Libre (CMLL). A common format for tournament trophies and vacant championships, the match format sees two teams of varying sizes face off against each other. It uses standard lucha libre tag team rules with elimination occurring with a pinfall, submission, disqualification and count out and allows a wrestler to enter the match when their tag team partner exits the ring as well as when they tag out. A special 'batting' order system is sometimes used in which the wrestlers are given a specific order and may only tag in and out in this order. If two or more men from the same team remain, they must face each other to determine one individual winner.

On the rare occasion, the match will be used for a Luchas de Apuestas. Called a revés (reverse) torneo cibernetico, scoring a fall eliminates the victor instead, until there are two luchadors left. At which point, it reverts to a standard singles match, with the loser relinquishing their mask or hair.

In early 2026, CMLL adjusted the structure for most of their ciberneticos, seemingly in an attempt to emulate AEW's Casino Gauntlet match. Instead of establishing teams before the start of the match (traditionally via seeding battle royal), individual luchadors would simply begin fighting everyone else immediately upon entering the ring area. Once all competitors had entered however, a whistle would sound to mark the official start of the match, and the entrants would improvise the team-based batting system they're familiar with regardless.

== History in the United States ==
=== Chikara ===
The lucha libre-inspired, Pennsylvania-based Chikara promotion held an annual show with a torneo cibernetico as their main event. The Chikara Torneo Cibernetico has always been a 16-man match with teams of eight facing off.

The first Chikara Torneo Cibernetico took place on October 30, 2004, in Emmaus, Pennsylvania, and featured "Sweet 'n' Sour International" (Larry Sweeney (captain), Crossbones, Hallowicked, Mano Metalico, Rorschach, ShareCropper, Spyrazul and UltraMantis Black) wrestling against the team of Jigsaw (captain), D. J. Skittlez, Gran Akuma, Icarus, Jolly Roger, Mister Zero, Private Eye and Shane Storm. Spyrazul unmasked himself as Mike Quackenbush and helped Jigsaw pick up the win over Sweeney.

The second annual Torneo Cibernetico took place on October 22, 2005, in Hellertown, Pennsylvania, and featured Chris Hero (captain), Blind Rage, Arik Cannon, Claudio Castagnoli, Gran Akuma, Hallowicked, Icarus and UltraMantis Black wrestling against Mike Quackenbush (captain), Jigsaw, Eddie Kingston, Milano Collection A.T., Sabian, Skayde, Shane Storm and Mister ZERO. Gran Akuma was victorious, lastly eliminating Shane Storm.

Chikara held their third annual Torneo Cibernetico on October 28, 2006, in Philadelphia, Pennsylvania. This edition featured Larry Sweeney (captain), Gran Akuma, Claudio Castagnoli, Chris Hero, Icarus, and The Thomaselli Brothers (Sal, Vito and Brandon) taking on the team of Eddie Kingston (captain), Cheech, Cloudy, Darin Corbin, Ryan Cruz, Hallowicked, Mike Quackenbush, and Shane Storm. Icarus emerged victorious, lastly eliminating Kingston.

Chikara's fourth annual Torneo Cibernetico was held on September 22, 2007, in Philadelphia and pitted The Kings of Wrestling (Mitch Ryder (captain), Chris Hero, Claudio Castagnoli, Larry Sweeney, Gran Akuma, Chuck Taylor, Icarus and Shayne Hawke) against Team Mega Mucha Lucha (Lince Dorado (captain), Incognito, Magno, Equinox, El Hijo del Ice Cream, Ice Cream, Jr., Chiva III and Chiva IV), in which Claudio Castagnoli would emerge victorious, lastly eliminating his own team captain, Mitch Ryder.

Chikara's fifth annual Torneo Cibernetico was held on November 15, 2008, in Framingham, Massachusetts, and saw "Team Equinox" (Jimmy "Equinox" Olsen (captain), Mike Quackenbush, Tim Donst, Hydra, Helios, Fire Ant, Soldier Ant, and Worker Ant) taking on "Team Gerard" (Vin Gerard (captain), Lince Dorado, Stigma, Eddie Kingston, Amasis, Ophidian, UltraMantis Black, and Crossbones). The winner was Jimmy Olsen lastly eliminating Ophidian.

Chikara's sixth annual Torneo Cibernetico was held on October 18, 2009, in Philadelphia, Pennsylvania, and was contested under parejas increibles rules, which meant that regular tag teams were broken up and the partners would be divided to opposing teams. The match saw "Team Hot Property" (Fire Ant (captain), Jigsaw, Frightmare, Green Ant, Player Dos, Matt Jackson, Helios and KC "Cloudy" Day) taking on "Soldier's Army" (Soldier Ant (captain), Mike Quackenbush, Hallowicked, Carpenter Ant, Player Uno, Nick Jackson, Lince Dorado and Cheech Hernandez). Carpenter Ant won the match, lastly eliminating his own team captain, Soldier Ant.

Chikara's seventh annual Torneo Cibernetico was held on October 23, 2010, in Easton, PA, and saw "Team Chikara" (UltraMantis Black (captain), Hallowicked, Icarus, Jigsaw, Eddie Kingston, Mike Quackenbush, STIGMA, and Vökoder) taking on "Der Bruderschaft des Kreuzes" (Ares (captain), Claudio Castagnoli, Sara Del Rey, Delirious, Tim Donst, Daizee Haze, Pinkie Sanchez, and Tursas). Eddie Kingston won the match, lastly eliminating Tursas.

Chikara's eighth annual Torneo Cibernetico was held on November 12, 2011, in Easton, PA, and saw "Team Hallowicked" (Hallowicked (captain), Sara Del Rey, Sugar Dunkerton, Green Ant, Dasher Hatfield, Matt Jackson, Nick Jackson, and UltraMantis Black) taking on "Team Donst" (Tim Donst (captain), Ares, Delirious, Jakob Hammermeier, Kobald, Kodama, Obariyon and Tursas). Sara Del Rey won the match, lastly eliminating Tim Donst.

Chikara's ninth annual Torneo Cibernetico took place November 18, 2012, in Manhattan, NY, and saw "Team Kingston" (Eddie Kingston (captain), 3.0 (Scott Parker and Shane Matthews), Tim Donst, Gran Akuma, and The Spectral Envoy (Frightmare, Hallowicked, and UltraMantis Black)) take on "Team Steen" (Kevin Steen (captain), Harlem Bravado, Lancelot Bravado, Jay Briscoe, Mark Briscoe, Matt Jackson, Nick Jackson, and Jimmy Jacobs). Tim Donst won the match, lastly eliminating Eddie Kingston.

Chikara's tenth annual Torneo Cibernetico took place on December 6, 2014, in Philadelphia, Pennsylvania, at the Tomorrow Never Dies internet pay-per-view and saw "The Chikara Squad" (Worker Ant II (captain), Amasis, Jervis Cottonbelly, Fire Ant, Kodama, Obariyon, Ophidian, and Silver Ant) take on "The Flood Squad" (Jakob Hammermeier (captain), Sir Oliver Grimsly, Jaka, Nøkken, Oleg the Usurper, Flex Rumblecrunch, Soldier Ant, and Volgar). Soldier Ant won the match, lastly eliminating Fire Ant.

Chikara's eleventh annual Torneo Cibernetico took place on December 5, 2015, in Philadelphia, Pennsylvania, and saw "Dasher's Squad" (Dasher Hatfield (captain), Amasis, the Estonian FarmerFrog, Heidi Lovelace, N_R_G (Race Jaxon and Hype Rockwell), Oleg the Usurper, and Worker Ant II) take on "Juan Francisco's Squad" (Juan Francisco de Coronado (captain), "Mr. Touchdown" Mark Angelosetti, Jakob Hammermeier, Mr. Azerbaijan, the Proletariat Boar of Moldova, Prakash Sabar, Pinkie Sanchez, and Wani). Juan Francisco de Coronado won the match, lastly eliminating Mr. Touchdown.

Chikara's twelfth annual Torneo Cibernetico took place on December 3, 2016, in Chicago, Illinois. The team of Hallowicked (captain), Mark Angelosetti, the Batiri (Obariyon, Kodama, and Kobald), Jigsaw, Icarus, and Frightmare took on Dasher Hatfield (captain), Ophidian, Fire Ant, Oleg the Usurper, Heidi Lovelace, Missile Assault Man, Thunderfrog, and Princess KimberLee. Hatfield won the match, lastly eliminating Hallowicked, the first time since the first Chikara Cibernetico that the opposing team captains were the final two participants in the match.

Chikara's thirteenth annual "Torneo Cibernetico" took place on November 24, 2018, in Philadelphia, Pennsylvania. The team of Team CHIKARA (Dasher Hatfield (captain), Hallowicked, Icarus, The Proletariat Boar of Moldova, UltraMantis Black, Boomer Hatfield, and Juan Francisco de Coronado) took on Team Beyond (Chris Dickinson (captain), Cam Zagami, Alex Reynolds, John Silver, Ryan Galeone, Brian Milonas, and Nick Gage. Chris Dickinson won the match, last eliminating Dasher Hatfield, the second time since the first Chikara Cibernetico that the opposing team captains were the final two participants in the match.

=== Camp Leapfrog ===
CHIKARA's successor, the lucha libre-inspired, Pennsylvania-based Camp Leapfrog promotion held a torneo cibernetico on January 30, 2021, in Philadelphia, Pennsylvania, as the sole match on their Game Changer Wrestling Fight Forever block, Cibernetico. It featured an 18-person match between two teams, "A Very Good Professional Wrestling Team," A Very Good Professional Wrestler (captain), BLANK, CC Boost, Dan Champion, Killian McMurphy, Masha Slamovich, Matt Demorest, Matt Makowski, and Travis Huckabee against "Best Campers Ever," Boomer Hatfield (captain), ABBS, Abby Jane, Boar, Jay Lyon, Midas Black, Molly McCoy, Still Life with Apricots and Pears and eventual winner, Erica Leigh.

== History in the United Kingdom ==
The UK wrestling promotion Grand Pro Wrestling has held a Cibernetico as an annual tradition ever since the promotion held the first ever Cibernetico match in the UK.
