= Arik Cannon =

American professional wrestler

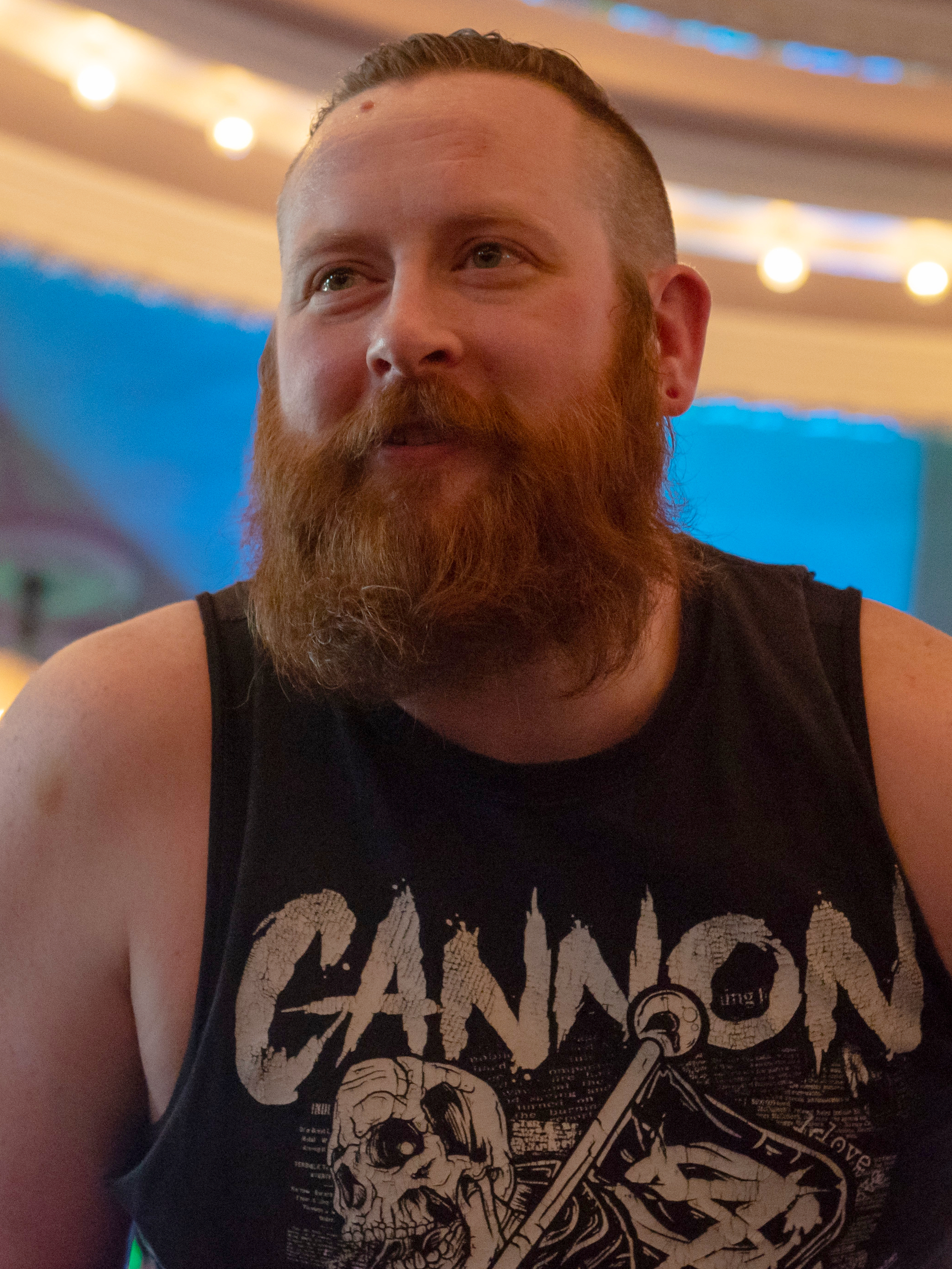
- Cannon in 2019

Personal information
- Born: December 23, 1981 (age 44) Saint Paul, Minnesota, U.S.

Professional wrestling career
- Ring name(s): Arik Cannon; Bryan Kendrick
- Billed height: 5 ft 7 in (1.70 m)
- Billed weight: 210 lb (95 kg)
- Trained by: Midwest Pro Wrestling; Sheik Adanan Al-Kaisey; Mike Quackenbush; Skayde; Chris Hero

Arik Cannon (born December 23, 1981) is an American professional wrestler and promoter, He currently performs on the independent circuit. He is best known for competing in companies such as Chikara, Dragon Gate USA, IWA Mid-South (IWA), All American Wrestling (AAW) and Wrestling Society X (WSX). He owns and operates the Minneapolis-based wrestling promotion F1RST Wrestling.

== Professional wrestling career ==
=== IWA Mid-South (2002–2004) ===
Arik Cannon was trained at Midwest Pro Wrestling and is known for wrestling in IWA Mid-South. There, he became the IWA Mid-South Heavyweight Champion by defeating Petey Williams in the Ted Petty Invitational Tournament. He defended it against Roderick Strong and Austin Aries, but was forced to give it up due to injury in 2004.

=== Chikara (2005–2006) ===
He returned to wrestling in 2005 and entered Chikara's Tag World Grand Prix 2005 with partner Claudio Castagnoli and made it to the finals to face Superfriends, Chris Hero and Mike Quackenbush. That night, Hero turned on Quackenbush and joined Cannon and Castagnoli, leading Cannon and Castagnoli to win the Tag World Grand Prix. The three began calling themselves The Kings of Wrestling. They began feuding with Quackenbush, but Cannon left the group in 2005. Cannon competed in the Tag World Grand Prix 2006 with Jigsaw as his partner, but lost in the second round. During June 2006, Arik Cannon wrestled in Chikara's fourth annual Young Lions Cup tournament. In the final round, he defeated Cheech to win the tournament. At Chikara's Cibernetico Forever event in October 2006, however, Max Boyer managed to beat him for the Cup.

=== Wrestling Society X (2006–2007) ===
In November 2006, Arik Cannon partook in the Wrestling Society X promotion's first season of television tapings, which later aired on MTV.

=== Dragon Gate (2007–2008) ===
In October 2007, Cannon went to Japan for a tour with Dragon Gate and was brought into the Muscle Outlawz faction by Naruki Doi along with fellow gaijins Kevin Steen and Jimmy Rave.

=== Dragon Gate USA (2009–2015) ===
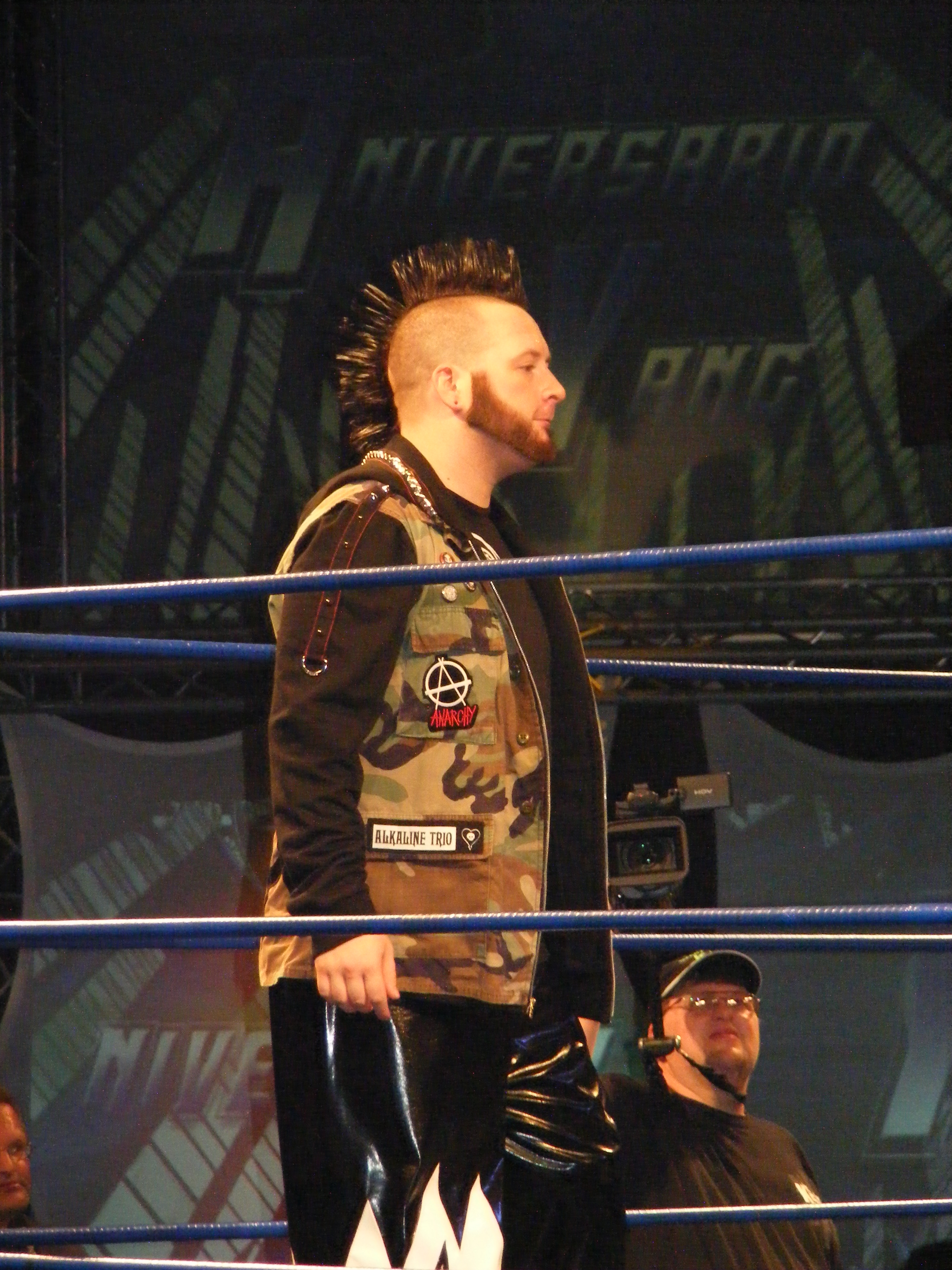
Cannon in 2009

On September 6, 2009, Cannon made his debut for Dragon Gate USA at the tapings of the promotion's second pay-per-view titled Untouchable. He would wrestle in an eight-way dark match, which was won by Johnny Gargano. After making several appearances for the promotion in 2010, Cannon was entered into the Breakout Challenge tournament on April 1, 2011. After defeating A. R. Fox, Facade and Shiima Xion in his first round match, Cannon defeated Jimmy Rave in the finals to win the tournament. Two days later at Open the Ultimate Gate, Cannon and Sami Callihan wrestled in a six–way match, before deciding to walk out on the match. Later in the event, Cannon and Callihan announced they would be forming a tag team named the D.U.F. (Dirty Ugly Fucks) and defeated the Dark City Fight Club (Jon Davis and Kory Chavis) in their first match together. On June 5 at Enter The Dragon 2011, Cannon and Callihan were joined by Pinkie Sanchez, before picking up a major win over the tag team of Open the Dream Gate Champion Masaaki Mochizuki and Susumu Yokosuka.

=== F1RST Wrestling (2007–present) ===
In 2007, Cannon founded the Minneapolis-based promotion F1RST Wrestling, which hosts its flagship WRESTLEPALOOZA events at Minneapolis' First Avenue nightclub. In recent years, the promotion has expanded to host events at an eclectic assortment of locations throughout the Twin Cities metropolitan area, including the Mall of America, James Ballentine VFW and Temple of Aaron Synagogue. Several performers from F1RST Wrestling have found later success in larger promotions, such as Seth Rollins, Ethan Page, Erick Rowan, Danhausen, Orange Cassidy, Darius Martin and Dante Martin of Top Flight, Colt Cabana, Gigi Dolin, Chuck Taylor, Josh Alexander, Johnny Gargano, Bryan Keith, and Ariya Daivari.

=== WWE (2017) ===
In 2017, Cannon appeared on March 7 episode of 205 Live. He was introduced by Brian Kendrick as Bryan Kendrick and lost to Akira Tozawa.

=== All Elite Wrestling (2021–2022) ===
In 2021, Cannon had two matches with All Elite Wrestling (AEW). First was June 5 where he teamed up with Kevin Blackwood in a tag match and faced Eddie Kingston and Penta El Zero Miedo in a loss on Dark: Elevation in Jacksonville, Florida. His second match was also a tag match in front of his home crowd in Minneapolis, Minnesota, on November 12, where he and Renny D took on The Pinnacle members Wardlow and Shawn Spears. This also was a loss. A 0–2 overall record in AEW as of 2021, he was not pinned in both of his matches.

On August 10, 2022, Cannon teamed with Travis Titan for a tag match taped for Dark: Elevation during the Quake by the Lake special. Cannon and Titan lost to Josh Woods and Tony Nese.

== Personal life ==
On August 8, 2026, after WWE wrestler Natalya Neidhart had made a comment regarding Avery Styles, son of WWE Hall of Famer AJ Styles during an interview about him "paying his dues", Cannon accused Avery of "skirting responsibility". AJ Styles responded to Cannon's accusations, claiming that he was paid to wrestle and not to set up the ring. On August 11, 2026, GCW owner Brett Lauderdale defended Styles by claiming that Avery had "earned his spot" despite his rookie status in the industry. on TMZ's Inside The Ring podcast, former WWE wrestler and All Elite Wrestling commentator Paul Wight responded to the scandal claiming that paying the dues existed as a way for veterans to bully and intimidate younger talent.

== Championships and accomplishments ==
- Orlando City Wrestling
  - Dark Battle To The Top Of The Mountain Tournament (2017)
- 2econd Wrestling
  - 2econd Wrestling Championship (1 time)
- 3X Wrestling
  - 3XW Cruiserweight Championship (1 time)
  - 3XW Pure Wrestling Championship (1 time)
- All American Wrestling
  - AAW Heritage Championship (2 times)
  - AAW Tag Team Championship (1 time) – with Jimmy Jacobs
- American Wrestling Federation
  - AWF TV Championship (1 time)
- Chikara
  - Young Lions Cup IV
  - Tag World Grand Prix (2005) – with Claudio Castagnoli
- Dragon Gate USA
  - Breakout Challenge (2011)
- Dreamwave Wrestling
  - Dreamwave Alternative Championship (1 time)
  - Dreamwave Tag Team Championship (1 time) – with Darin Corbin
- F1RST Wrestling
  - Uptown VFW Championship (1 time)
  - WrestlePalooza Championship (1 time)
- FIST Wrestling
  - FIST Tag Team Championship (1 time) - with Danny Daniels
- Fully Loaded Wrestling
  - FLW Cup (2017)
- Heavy on Wrestling
  - HOW Undisputed Championship (1 time)
- Independent Wrestling Association Mid-South
  - IWA Mid-South Heavyweight Championship (2 times)
- Midwest Pro Wrestling
  - MPW Cruiserweight Championship (3 times)
  - MPW Universal Championship (1 time, inaugural)
  - MPW Universal Championship Tournament (2004)
- Northern Impact Wrestling
  - NIW Impact Championship (1 time)
- Northern Outlaw Wrestling
  - NOW Heavyweight Championship (1 time)
- Pro Wrestling Illustrated
  - PWI ranked him #200 of the top 500 singles wrestlers in the PWI 500 in 2011
- Pro Wrestling Phoenix
  - PWP Heavyweight Championship (1 time)
- Steel Domain Wrestling
  - SDW Tag Team Championships (1 time) – with AJ LaRock
