= Kings of Wrestling =

Professional wrestling stable

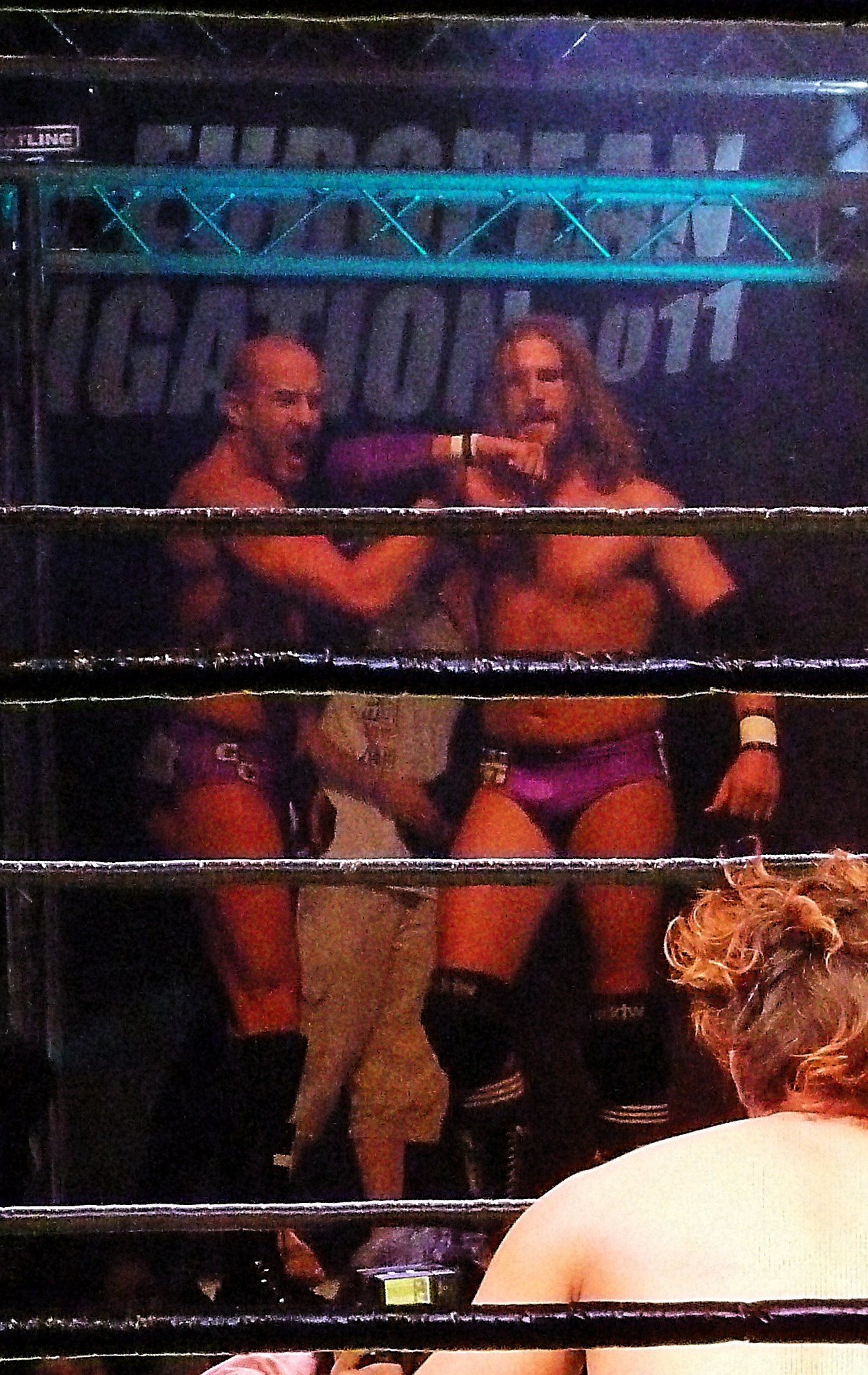
- Claudio Castagnoli and Chris Hero performing their signature pose after winning on Pro Wrestling Noah's European Navigation Tour

Stable
- Members: Arik Cannon; Chris Hero; Chuck Taylor; Claudio Castagnoli; Gran Akuma; Icarus; Larry Sweeney; Max Boyer; Mitch Ryder; Sara Del Rey; Shane Hagadorn; Shayne Hawke
- Name(s): Kings of Professional Wrestling; Kings of Wrestling
- Debut: February 20, 2005
- Disbanded: August 20, 2011
- Years active: 2005–2011

The Kings of Wrestling was a professional wrestling stable that worked on the independent circuit. It was formed in Chikara as a large stable, but also appeared in numerous promotions mainly as a tag team of Chris Hero and Claudio Castagnoli. Hero's manager Larry Sweeney and valet Sara Del Rey were also part of the group at differing times. The group also comprised Icarus and Gran Akuma who teamed separately as Team F.I.S.T. (Friends in Similar Tights) as well as Arik Cannon, Mitch Ryder, Max Boyer, Chuck Taylor and Shayne Hawke.

The name is most commonly associated with the tag team of Chris Hero and Claudio Castagnoli. Together, Hero and Castagnoli are former CZW World Tag Team Champions, JCW Tag Team Champions, Chikara Campeones de Parejas, and ROH World Tag Team Champions, having at one point held all three titles simultaneously. After an initial run from 2005 to 2007, they reformed at ROH's first internet pay-per-view Final Battle 2009 with Shane Hagadorn as their manager and Sara Del Rey as their valet and occasional partner. 2010 was a marquee year for the team that saw them regain ROH's World Tag Team Championship and reign for one day shy of a year, as well as being voted the Tag Team of the Year in the Wrestling Observer Newsletter awards.

== History ==
=== Formation (2005) ===
The team came about on February 20, 2005, in the finals of Chikara's Tag World Grand Prix 2005, when Chris Hero turned on his Super Friends partner Mike Quackenbush and joined Claudio Castagnoli and Arik Cannon. Cannon left the group in December of that same year. Hero and Castagnoli continued teaming together, and in 2006, became the first Chikara Campeones de Parejas by winning the 2006 Tag World Grand Prix tournament, defeating Milano Collection A.T. and Skayde in the final round.

Hero and Castagnoli are also known for teaming in Combat Zone Wrestling. On September 10, 2005, they won the CZW World Tag Team Championship from The Tough Crazy Bastards, Necro Butcher and Toby Klein. In 2005, Chris Hero became involved in a feud with Eddie Kingston. This feud involved Hero's partner Castagnoli as well as Kingston's stablemates from BLKOUT. At Cage of Death 7, Hero and Castagnoli defended the tag titles against Kingston and Sabian, and at An Afternoon of Main Events, they teamed with Super Dragon, with whom they formed an alliance, to face Kingston, Sabian, and Ruckus. In February 2006, the Kings of Wrestling lost the titles to Eddie Kingston and Joker.

=== Triple Tag Team Champions (2005–2007) ===
In late 2005, Chris Hero began a war with Ring of Honor. Castagnoli, who was a member of the ROH roster at the time, said he would be loyal to ROH despite his relationship with Hero. However, at the 100th Show during a CZW vs. ROH six man tag team match, Castagnoli came to the ring and turned on ROH, helping CZW win the match, and uniting with Hero for the first time in ROH. They went on to team together as the Kings of Wrestling to face and defeat B. J. Whitmer and Adam Pearce at How We Roll. On July 15, 2006, at Death Before Dishonor 4 Team ROH (Samoa Joe, B. J. Whitmer, Adam Pearce, Ace Steel, and Bryan Danielson (later replaced by Homicide) defeated Team CZW (Hero, Castagnoli, Necro Butcher, Nate Webb and Eddie Kingston) in a Cage of Death match to end the feud.

In August 2006, the Ring of Honor tag title belts were stolen and later returned from champions Austin Aries and Roderick Strong. Hero revealed on his LiveJournal that he and Castagnoli were the culprits and would be challenging for the titles. On September 16, at Globy by Honor V Night 2 they defeated Aries and Strong for the championship with their new KRS ONE finisher, but only after illegally smashing Aries in his bruised ribs with Castagnoli's aluminum Zero Halliburton attache case.

On October 14, 2006, the Kings of Wrestling defeated three other teams in a one night tournament at the CZW show Last Team Standing to become two-time CZW Tag Team Champions. They defeated Team Masturbation (Beef Wellington and Excalibur) in the first round, the BLKOUT (Ruckus and Human Tornado) in the second round, and the makeshift team of Justice Pain and Human Tornado (subbing for Pain's partner in the H8 Club, Nick Gage, who left the building before the match) in the third round. This has made the Kings of Wrestling the only Independent Triple Crown Tag Champions ever. On October 21, 2006, at Horror Business they also attempted to win the Pro Wrestling Guerrilla World Tag Team Championship to hold four different sets of Tag Team titles simultaneously, but were unable to dethrone the champions Super Dragon and Davey Richards.

Around this time, it was announced that Castagnoli would be going to World Wrestling Entertainment. At Night of Infamy 5, the Kings lost the CZW tag championship to Sabian and Robbie Mireno after Eddie Kingston eliminated Hero from the match and the BLKOUT outnumbered Castagnoli for the win. On November 17, they lost the Campeonatos de Parejas to F.I.S.T. (Gran Akuma and Icarus) Afterwards, Hero turned on Castagnoli and kicked him out of the stable. They lost the ROH Tag Team Championship to Matt Sydal and Christopher Daniels on November 25 at Dethroned. On December 22, 2006, Larry Sweeney debuted in ROH to help the Kings of Wrestling defeat the Briscoe Brothers. The following night at Final Battle 2006, Chris Hero and Claudio Castagnoli lost a rematch to the Briscoes. After the match, Castagnoli announced that he would not be going to WWE, but Sweeney said he was only representing Chris Hero, for whom they had big plans, and the two walked out on Castagnoli.

In February 2007, Chikara held the first annual King of Trios tournament. Originally, the Kings of Wrestling team was made up of Hero and F.I.S.T., but Hero was replaced with Chuck Taylor. They lost in the semifinals of the tournament. On April 22, Hero defeated Clastagnoli in a match where if Hero won, then Claudio would have to rejoin him. On May 25 at Chikara's Aniversario? event, Hero and Sweeney aligned themselves with Mitch Ryder, while Team F.I.S.T. recruited Young Lions Cup Champion Max Boyer, just as Hero was about to recruit him himself. The following day at the Aniversario! event the two factions within the Kings of Wrestling, Icarus, Akuma and Taylor, accompanied by Boyer, and Hero, Castagnoli and Sweeney, accompanied by Ryder, faced each other. F.I.S.T. were victorious, but after the match all eight men joined forces, after a pep talk by Ryder. Boyer would leave the promotion two months later and his spot in the group would be filled by Shayne Hawke. On September 22, 2007, at Cibernetico & Robin the Kings of Wrestling faced Team Mega Mucha Lucha in the annual torneo cibernetico match. The Kings won the match with Hero, Castagnoli and Mitch Ryder as the survivors, but since the match could only have one winner, they were forced to face each other. Castagnoli forced Hero to tap out and then pinned Ryder to win not only the match, but also his freedom from the Kings of Wrestling. On December 9, 2007, Castagnoli defeated Hero to win their feud. Afterwards, Hero left the company, disbanding the Kings of Wrestling, with Team F.I.S.T. continuing as its own faction.

=== Hero and Castagnoli reunion (2009–2011, 2012, 2018) ===
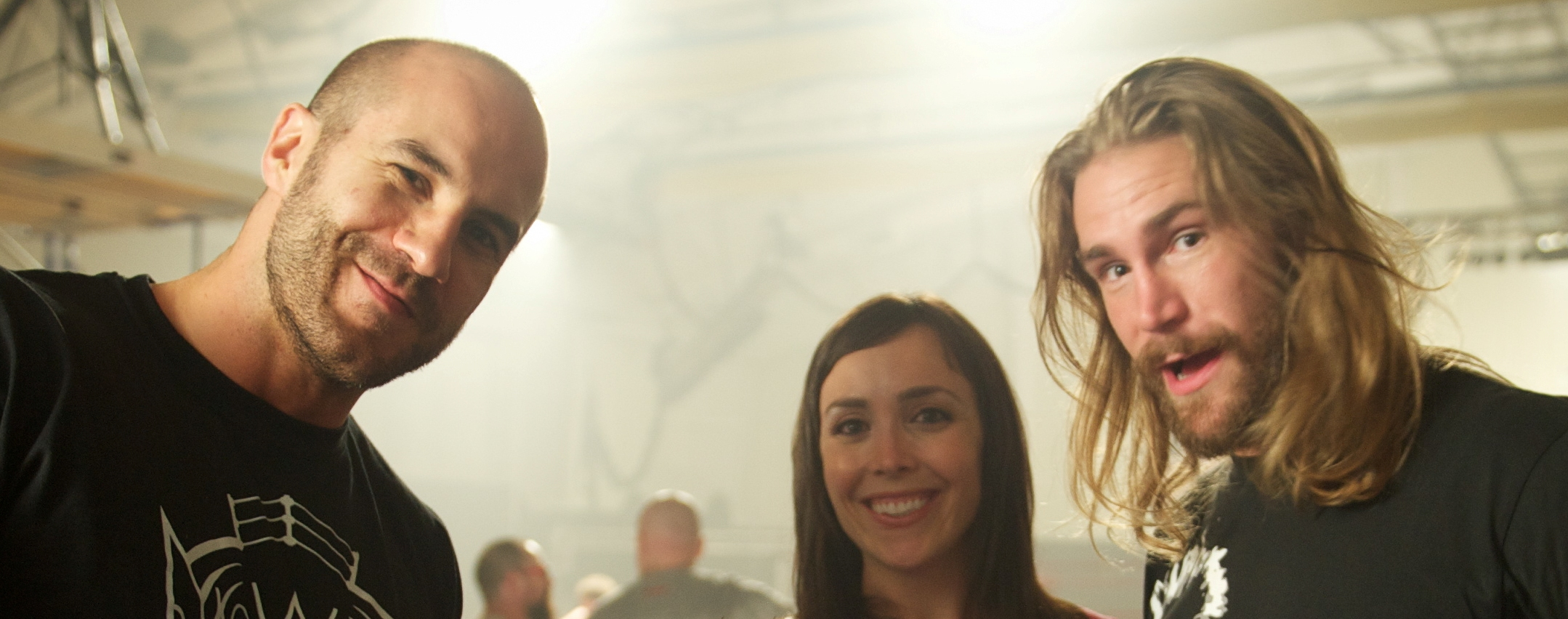
Left to right: Claudio Castagnoli, Sara Del Rey and Chris Hero as the Kings of Wrestling in 2011

On December 19, 2009, at Final Battle 2009, Ring of Honor's first live pay-per-view, the Kings of Wrestling reunited as Hero and Castagnoli attacked the new ROH World Tag Team Champions, the Briscoe Brothers. Afterwards, The Kings of Wrestling once again became a stable with the additions of Sara Del Rey, whom Hero and Castagnoli dubbed the "Queen of Wrestling", and their manager Shane Hagadorn. Hero and Castagnoli attacked the Brisces once more at ROH's 8th Anniversary Show, also brawling with the Dark City Fight Club. In January 2010 Hero and Castagnoli entered Pro Wrestling Noah's Global Tag League, but ended up losing all three of their matches. On April 3, 2010, at The Big Bang! Hero and Castagnoli defeated the Briscoes to win the ROH World Tag Team Championship for the second time.

On August 15, 2010, Hero and Castagnoli defeated the Thomaselli Brothers, Briscoe Brothers, and Ring Rydas at Juggalo Championship Wrestling's Bloodymania IV to become the new JCW Tag Team Champions. Hero and Castagnoli were stripped of the titles on February 7, 2011.

In July Ring of Honor announced the return of Tag Wars, where twelve tag teams would compete in three blocks to determine, which three would get to challenge the Kings of Wrestling in the final Ultimate Endurance match. On August 28 the Kings of Wrestling defeated The Dark City Fight Club (Jon Davis and Kory Chavis), The All Night Express (Kenny King and Rhett Titus) and the Briscoes in the Ultimate Endurance match to win the 2010 Tag Wars and retain the ROH World Tag Team Championship. Hero and Castagnoli returned to Noah on November 19, 2010, for a three-week-long tour. The team went undefeated in tag team matches, before being defeated on December 5, the final day of the tour, by Takuma Sano and Yoshihiro Takayama in a match for the GHC Tag Team Championship. On December 11, 2010, the Kings of Wrestling returned to Pro Wrestling Guerrilla, unsuccessfully challenging ¡Peligro Abejas! (El Generico and Paul London) for the PWG World Tag Team Championship. On January 4, 2011, Hero and Castagnoli became the longest reigning ROH World Tag Team Champions by breaking the previous record of 275 days, set by the Briscoe Brothers. On April 1 at Honor Takes Center Stage, the Kings of Wrestling lost the ROH World Tag Team Championship to Wrestling's Greatest Tag Team (Charlie Haas and Shelton Benjamin), ending their reign at 363 days. The Kings' last appearance in Ring of Honor was on the first episode of Ring of Honor Wrestling after it moved to the Sinclair Broadcast Group. They tried to reclaim their championship from Wrestling's Greatest Tag Team but were unsuccessful.

On the August 23, 2012, Hero and Castagnoli (under the new names of Kassius Ohno and Antonio Cesaro, respectively) reunited in an untelevised match to face the team of WWE Champion CM Punk and NXT Champion Seth Rollins at an NXT taping; they lost.

In September 2018 at an untelevised NXT show, during an attack on Ohno at the hands of The Undisputed Era, Cesaro ran in to even the odds against the attackers, before attacking Adam Cole with Ohno. The two celebrated and posed after clearing the ring.

== Championships and accomplishments ==
=== Hero and Castagnoli ===
- Chikara
  - Campeonatos de Parejas (1 time)
  - Tag World Grand Prix (2006)
  - Torneo Cibernetico (2007) – Castagnoli
- Combat Zone Wrestling
  - CZW World Tag Team Championship (2 times)
  - Last Team Standing (2006)
- Juggalo Championship Wrestling
  - JCW Tag Team Championship (1 time)
- Pro Wrestling Guerrilla
  - PWG World Championship (1 time) – Castagnoli
- Pro Wrestling Noah
  - Global Tag League Fighting Spirit Award (2011)
  - Global Tag League Technique Award (2010)
- Ring of Honor
  - ROH World Tag Team Championship (2 times)
  - Tag Wars Tournament (2010)
- Wrestling Observer Newsletter awards
  - Tag Team of the Year (2010)

=== Other ===
- Chikara
  - Campeonatos de Parejas (1 time) – Icarus and Akuma (1)
  - Young Lions Cup (2 times) – Boyer (1) and Taylor (1)
