= ROH Death Before Dishonor =

Ring of Honor pay-per-view event series

- ROH Death Before Dishonor logo
- Promotions: Ring of Honor
- First event: 2003

Death Before Dishonor is a professional wrestling event, held annually by the Ring of Honor promotion. The event was initially held in 2003, and is traditionally one of ROH's biggest signature events in the calendar year. The 2010 edition of the show was ROH's third internet pay-per-view, and the third ROH show to be broadcast live. The 2011 and 2012 editions were also broadcast as internet pay-per-views. The 2020 event was scheduled for an unspecified date but was ultimately cancelled due to the COVID-19 pandemic.

== Dates and venues ==
Event	Date	Venue	City	Main event
Death Before Dishonor (2003)	July 19, 2003	Rex Plex	Elizabeth, New Jersey	Samoa Joe (c) vs. Paul London for the ROH World Championship
Death Before Dishonor 2: Part One	July 23, 2004	Muellner Building	Wauwatosa, Wisconsin	The Second City Saints (CM Punk and Colt Cabana) (c) vs. The Briscoe Brothers (Jay Briscoe and Mark Briscoe) in a Two Out of Three Falls match for the ROH World Tag Team Championship
Death Before Dishonor 2: Part Two	July 24, 2004	Frontier Fieldhouse	Chicago Ridge, Illinois	The Second City Saints (CM Punk and Ace Steel) vs. Dan Maff and B. J. Whitmer in a Chicago Street Fight
Death Before Dishonor III	June 18, 2005	Mennen Sports Arena	Morristown, New Jersey	Austin Aries (c) vs. CM Punk for the ROH World Championship
Death Before Dishonor IV	July 15, 2006	National Guard Armory	Philadelphia, Pennsylvania	ROH (Samoa Joe, Adam Pearce, B. J. Whitmer, Ace Steel and Homicide) vs. CZW (Chris Hero, Claudio Castagnoli, Necro Butcher, Nate Webb and Eddie Kingston) in a Cage of Death
Death Before Dishonor V: Night One	August 10, 2007	Roxbury Community College	Boston, Massachusetts	The Briscoe Brothers (Jay Briscoe and Mark Briscoe) vs. Kevin Steen and El Generico in a Boston Street Fight
Death Before Dishonor V: Night Two	August 11, 2007	National Guard Armory	Philadelphia, Pennsylvania	The Resilience (Austin Aries, Matt Cross and Erick Stevens) and Delirious vs. No Remorse Corps (Roderick Strong, Davey Richards and Rocky Romero) and Matt Sydal in a Philadelphia Street Fight
Death Before Dishonor VI	August 2, 2008	Hammerstein Ballroom	New York City, New York	Nigel McGuinness (c) vs. Bryan Danielson vs. Claudio Castagnoli vs. Tyler Black in a FFour Way Elimination match for the ROH World Championship
Death Before Dishonor VII: Night One	July 24, 2009	Ted Reeve Arena	Toronto, Ontario	Austin Aries (c) vs. Jerry Lynn vs. Nigel McGuinness vs. Tyler Black in a Four Corner Survival match for the ROH World Championship
Death Before Dishonor VII: Night Two	July 25, 2009	Ted Reeve Arena	Toronto, Ontario	Chris Hero vs. Lance Storm
Death Before Dishonor VIII	June 19, 2010	Ted Reeve Arena	Toronto, Ontario	Tyler Black (c) vs. Davey Richards for the ROH World Championship
Death Before Dishonor IX	September 17, 2011	Manhattan Center	New York City, New York	The Briscoe Brothers (Jay Briscoe and Mark Briscoe) vs. The All Night Express (Kenny King and Rhett Titus) in Ladder War III
Death Before Dishonor X: State of Emergency	September 15, 2012	Frontier Fieldhouse	Chicago Ridge, Illinois	Kevin Steen (c) vs. Rhino in a No Disqualification match for the ROH World Championship
Death Before Dishonor XI	September 20, 2013	Pennsylvania National Guard Armory	Philadelphia, Pennsylvania	Adam Cole vs. Michael Elgin in the final match of the ROH World Championship tournament
Death Before Dishonor XII: Night One	August 22, 2014	The Turner Hall Ballroom	Milwaukee, Wisconsin	Michael Elgin (c) vs. Silas Young for the ROH World Championship
Death Before Dishonor XII: Night Two	August 23, 2014	Frontier Fieldhouse	Chicago Ridge, Illinois	Michael Elgin (c) vs. Tommaso Ciampa for the ROH World Championship
Death Before Dishonor XIII	July 24, 2015	William J Myers Pavilion	Baltimore, Maryland	Jay Lethal (c) vs. Roderick Strong for the ROH World Championship
Death Before Dishonor XIV	August 19, 2016	Sam's Town Live	Sunrise Manor, Nevada	Jay Lethal (c) vs. Adam Cole for the ROH World Championship
Death Before Dishonor XV	September 22, 2017	Sam's Town Live	Sunrise Manor, Nevada	Cody (c) vs. Minoru Suzuki for the ROH World Championship
Death Before Dishonor XVI	September 28, 2018	Orleans Arena	Paradise, Nevada	Jay Lethal (c) vs. Will Ospreay for the ROH World Championship
Death Before Dishonor XVII	September 27, 2019	Sam's Town Live	Sunrise Manor, Nevada	Matt Taven (c) vs. Rush for the ROH World Championship
Death Before Dishonor XVIII	September 12, 2021	2300 Arena	Philadelphia, Pennsylvania	Bandido (c) vs. Brody King vs. Demonic Flamita vs. EC3 for the ROH World Championship
Death Before Dishonor (2022)	July 23, 2022	Tsongas Center	Lowell, Massachusetts	FTR (Cash Wheeler and Dax Harwood) (c) vs. The Briscoe Brothers (Jay Briscoe and Mark Briscoe) in a Two-out-of-three-falls match for the ROH World Tag Team Championship
Death Before Dishonor (2023)	July 21, 2023	CURE Insurance Arena	Trenton, New Jersey	Athena (c) vs. Willow Nightingale for the ROH Women's World Championship
Death Before Dishonor (2024)	July 26, 2024	Esports Stadium Arlington	Arlington, Texas	Mark Briscoe (c) vs. Roderick Strong for the ROH World Championship
Death Before Dishonor (2025)	August 29, 2025	2300 Arena	Philadelphia, Pennsylvania	Athena (c) vs. Mina Shirakawa for the ROH Women's World Championship
Death Before Dishonor (2026)	August 21, 2026	2300 Arena	Philadelphia, Pennsylvania	Athena (c) vs. Hazuki for the ROH Women's World Championship
(c) – refers to the champion(s) heading into the match

== See also ==
- List of Ring of Honor pay-per-view and livestreaming events
