= Death Before Dishonor VI =

2008 professional wrestling event

- Promotion: Ring of Honor
- Date: August 2, 2008
- City: New York City, New York
- Venue: Hammerstein Ballroom
- Attendance: 1, 850

Pay-per-view chronology
← Previous; Fueling The Fire	Next → Age Of Insanity

Death Before Dishonor chronology
← Previous; V	Next → VII

Death Before Dishonor VI was the sixth Death Before Dishonor professional wrestling event produced by Ring of Honor (ROH), which took place on August 2, 2008, at the Hammerstein Ballroom in New York City, New York.

Prominent matches for the night included El Generico and Kevin Steen defeating The Motor City Machine Guns in a tag team match. Two titles were in contention for the night; Brent Albright defeated reigning champion Adam Pearce for the NWA World Heavyweight Championship, whilst in the main event, ROH World Championship holder Nigel McGuinness defeated Bryan Danielson, Claudio Castagnoli and Tyler Black to retain the title.

== Storylines ==
Death Before Dishonor VI featured professional wrestling matches, involving different wrestlers from pre-existing scripted feuds, plots, and storylines that played out on ROH's television programs. Wrestlers portrayed villains or heroes as they followed a series of events that built tension and culminated in a wrestling match or series of matches.

== Reception ==
In a retrospective review for 411MANIA, Kevin Pantoja praised the event as a whole, giving it an overall score of 9 out of 10. He noted it as a massive improvement over Ring of Honor's first show at the Hammerstein Ballroom, declaring it "the big show they should've used for their debut." He heaped praise on both championship matches, calling the NWA World Heavyweight Champion bout "way better then expected", that it had an "old school feel in a great way", and closed his thoughts on the match by urging fans to watch it. He similarly praised the ROH World Championship match, declaring it "insane" and "masterfully done". He closed his review of the event by stating that "this was among the best" of all the Ring of Honor shows he had attended, lauding the amount of variety in wrestling genre across the card, and simply stating "Seriously, go watch this show now."

== Results ==
No.	Results	Stipulations	Times
1	The Briscoes (Jay Briscoe and Mark Briscoe) defeated The Vulture Squad (Jigsaw and Ruckus)	Tag team match	6:00
2	Chris Hero (with Bobby Dempsey, Eddie Edwards and Larry Sweeney) defeated Delirious	Singles match	8:23
3	Eddie Edwards (with Bobby Dempsey, Chris Hero and Larry Sweeney) defeated Roderick Strong	Singles match	9:42
4	Brent Albright defeated Adam Pearce (c) (with Bobby Dempsey, Sara Del Rey, Larry Sweeney and Shane Hagadorn)	Singles match for the NWA World Heavyweight Championship	19:42
5	Austin Aries defeated Jimmy Jacobs and Necro Butcher	Three Way Dance match	11:47
6	Naomichi Marufuji defeated Go Shiozaki	Singles match	23:02
7	El Generico and Kevin Steen defeated The Motor City Machine Guns (Alex Shelley and Chris Sabin)	Tag team match	19:51
8	Nigel McGuinness (c) defeated Bryan Danielson and Claudio Castagnoli and Tyler Black	Four Way Elimination match for the ROH World Championship	30:45
(c) / – the champion(s) heading into the match

== See also ==
- 2008 in professional wrestling
