= Boiling Point (2012) =

- Promotional poster featuring Kevin Steen, Eddie Kingston, Eddie Edwards, Sara Del Rey, Mike Bennett, and Maria Kanellis
- Promotion: Ring of Honor
- Date: August 11, 2012
- City: Providence, Rhode Island
- Venue: Rhode Island Convention Center
- Attendance: 450

Pay-per-view chronology
| ← Previous; Best in the World 2012: Hostage Crisis | Next → Death Before Dishonor X: State of Emergency |

Boiling Point (2012) was a professional wrestling Internet pay-per-view (iPPV) event produced by Ring of Honor (ROH) which took place on August 11, 2012 at the Rhode Island Convention Center in Providence, Rhode Island.

== Production ==
Other on-screen personnel
| Role | Name |
|---|---|
| Commentators | Kevin Kelly |
| Commentators | Nigel McGuinness |

=== Storylines ===
Boiling Point featured professional wrestling matches involving different wrestlers from pre-existing feuds, plots, and story lines that played out on Ring of Honor's (ROH) television programs.

== Results ==
| No. | Results | Stipulations | Times |
|---|---|---|---|
| 1^{D} | The Bravado Brothers (Harlem and Lancelot Bravado) defeated Jorge Santi and Mike Sydal | Tag team match | — |
| 2 | Roderick Strong (with Truth Martini) defeated Mike Mondo | Singles match | 12:39 |
| 3 | QT Marshall defeated Matt Taven, Antonio Thomas, and Vinny Marseglia | Four Corner Survival match for a Ring of Honor contract | 11:00 |
| 4 | Adam Cole defeated Bob Evans | Proving Ground match | 10:02 |
| 5 | Charlie Haas defeated Michael Elgin (with Truth Martini) | Singles match | 14:41 |
| 6 | The Briscoe Brothers (Jay Briscoe and Mark Briscoe) defeated S.C.U.M. (Jimmy Jacobs and Steve Corino) | Tag team match | 12:45 |
| 7 | Jay Lethal defeated Tommaso Ciampa (with R.D. Evans) (2-1) | Two out of three falls match | 15:14 |
| 8 | Eddie Edwards and Sara Del Rey defeated Mike Bennett and Maria Kanellis (with Bob Evans) | Mixed tag team match | 13:06 |
| 9 | Kevin Steen (c) defeated Eddie Kingston | Anything Goes match for the ROH World Championship | 18:46 |
(c) / – the champion(s) heading into the match; D / – this was a dark match
