= Final Battle 2010 =

Professional wrestling event

- Event poster featuring Davey Richards (left) and ROH World Champion Roderick Strong (right)
- Promotion: Ring of Honor
- Date: December 18, 2010
- City: New York, New York
- Venue: Manhattan Center
- Attendance: 2,550 (sold out)

Pay-per-view chronology
← Previous; Glory By Honor IX	Next → 9th Anniversary Show

Final Battle chronology
← Previous; 2009	Next → 2011

Final Battle 2010 was a professional wrestling pay-per-view (PPV) event produced by Ring of Honor (ROH). It took place on December 18, 2010, at the Manhattan Center in New York City. It was the eighth annual event in the Final Battle chronology, with the first taking place in 2002, but only the second to be broadcast live. It was the fifth ROH event to be shown as an online pay-per-view.

The event saw the culmination of two rivalries, a yearlong battle between former tag team Kevin Steen and El Generico, as well as the feud between The Kings of Wrestling and The Briscoe Brothers. Also on the card Davey Richards, who had originally planned to stop wrestling after this event, challenged Roderick Strong for the ROH World Championship. Five other matches also took place on the undercard.

== Production ==
=== Background ===
In September 2010, Jim Cornette announced that Final Battle 2010 would be taking place in the Grand Ballroom at the Manhattan Center in New York City on December 18, 2010, and would be live on internet pay-per-view through GoFightLive.

=== Storylines ===
Other on-screen personnel
Commentators	Dave Prazak
Commentators	Kevin Kelly

Final Battle featured professional wrestling matches that involved different wrestlers from existing, scripted feuds and storylines. Wrestlers portray villains or heroes, or more ambiguous characters in scripted contests that build tension and culminate in a wrestling match on the pay-per-view.

The featured grudge match at the event was Kevin Steen wrestling El Generico in a Fight Without Honor, an ROH speciality match with hardcore rules and no disqualifications. The stipulations for the match meant that if Steen lost, he would no longer wrestle in ROH while if Generico lost, he would have to remove his luchadore mask. Steen and Generico were a tag team dating back to early 2007, up until Final Battle 2009 when Steen, frustrated after losing a tag team match, low-blowed Generico and hit him over the head with a chair. The next week, Steve Corino published a video recording from Japan, where he was wrestling at the time, taking responsibility for Steen's actions, naming him a future World Champion and warning off Generico and Colt Cabana, who came out in defence of Generico at Final Battle. With Generico becoming reclusive and not seeking revenge, Cabana sought it on him behalf in a match at the Eighth Anniversary Show where Corino joined in an assault on Cabana. Generico came to Cabana's rescue but as he went to hit Corino, Steen stood in his way and Generico couldn't bring himself to hit his former partner, giving Steen the chance to punch Generico and lock in a crossface. Despite attacking Generico, Steen had refused to accept any challenge to step into the ring with his former partner, until he was forced into a match at April's iPPV The Big Bang!. In the tag team match, Generico continued to be unable to face his former partner. Cabana and Generico won by disqualification against Corino and Steen when Steen attacked Cabana with a chair repeatedly until Generico finally attacked his former partner and even attacked other wrestlers who attempted to restrain him. Generico challenged the two to a Chicago Street Fight later that month which they won after Cabana made Corino submit.

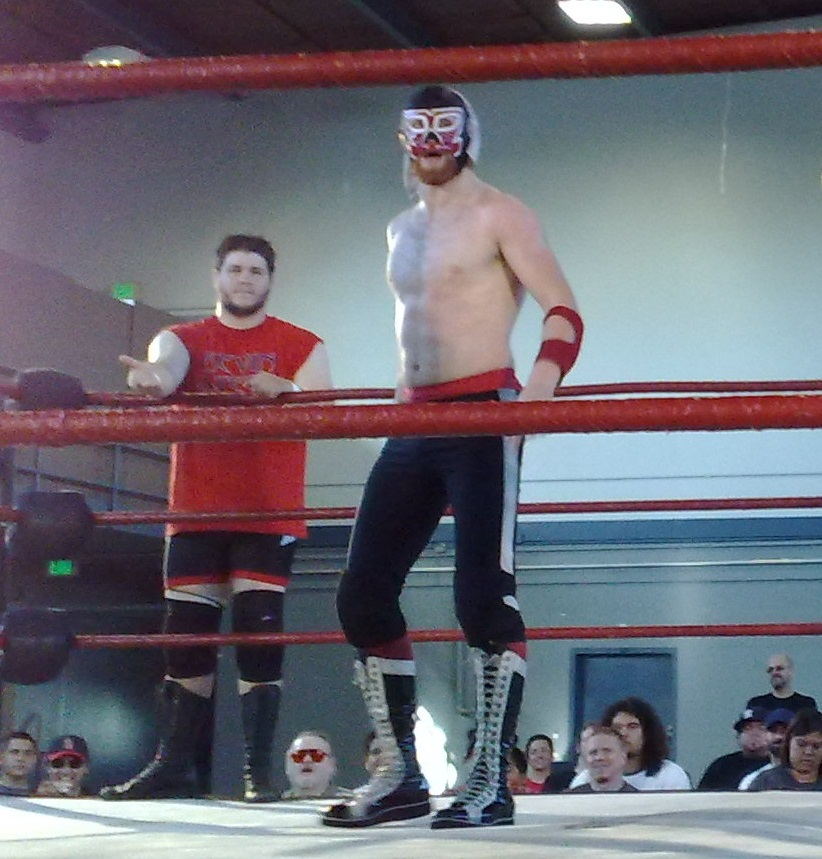
Kevin Steen (left) spent much of 2010 playing mind games with El Generico (right) after their acrimonious split.

Generico and Steen met in their first singles match at the June iPPV Death Before Dishonor VIII, with Generico demanding the match start as soon as the event began rather than waiting for later in the evening. Steen won their first encounter, while a rematch at Hate: Chapter II saw Generico win by disqualification after hitting Generico with a chair, but Generico gained revenge but putting Steen through a table. At the Glory By Honor IX iPPV, Cabana made Corino submit again in a Double Chain match but after the match Corino's son helped assault the team, finishing with Steen pulling Generico's mask off. Steen later announced he would sell the mask on eBay and on the 15 November episode of Ring of Honor Wrestling challenged Generico to a final match at Final Battle, with Generico's mask and Steen's ROH's contract on the line which Generico, wearing a new all-black mask, accepted. ROH president Cary Silkin later announced it would also be a Fight Without Honor. Three days before the event, ROH officials made the storyline announcement that due to the volatile nature of the rivalry, with Steen having attacked fans wearing Generico masks and much of the venues being used when the two had fought previously that the match would no longer be sanctioned by Ring of Honor and would take place after the official Final Battle card had finished with ROH taking no liability for the match.

The World Championship rivalry going into the PPV was for the ROH World Championship between reigning champion Roderick Strong and challenger Davey Richards. Throughout most of 2010, since being the judge for Tyler Black's World Title win at Eighth Anniversary in February, Strong sought a chance at the championship. When he failed to win at Supercard of Honor V, Strong introduced Truth Martini as his manager and life consultant. Truth negotiated a rematch and helped Strong win the ROH World Championship at the previous PPV Glory By Honor IX in September. At the same event, ROH Commissioner Jim Cornette announced Richards had re-signed with ROH after he had discussed retiring from all professional wrestling by the end of 2010. As well as announcing his intentions not to retire at Final Battle, Richards was promised a World Championship match by Cornette at the event.

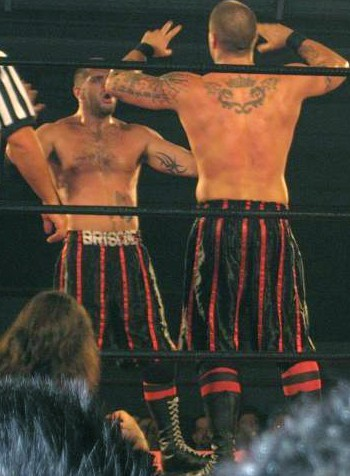
The Briscoe Brothers recruited their father for the ongoing rivalry with The Kings of Wrestling.

The other featured grudge match on the card is a Six-Man Tag Team match between reigning ROH World Tag Team Champions the Kings of Wrestling (Chris Hero, Claudio Castagnoli and their manager Shane Hagadorn) and the Briscoe Brothers (Jay Briscoe and Mark Briscoe) who will be teaming with their father, Papa Briscoe. The previous year at Final Battle 2009, the Briscoe Brothers won the World Tag Team Championships for the unprecedented sixth time, but their celebrations were instantly cut short by an unprovoked attack from Castanoli and Hero, reuniting their former tag team. The two teams met at WrestleReunion 4 in an Eight-Man match, the Kings accompanied by The American Wolves and the Briscoes with The Young Bucks, where the Wolves forced the Bucks to submit. Once again the Kings attacked the Briscoes after a championship match at the Eighth Anniversary Show. The following month in a Six-Man Tag Team match without Castagnoli, the Briscoes pinned Hero. This led to a title match at The Big Bang! iPPV where the Kings of Wrestling won the Tag Team Championships from the Briscoes after a distraction from Hagadorn allowed Hero to pull on a weighted elbow pad. After trading victories in two singles matches at Civil Warfare in May, the Briscoes interfered the Kings' title defence at Supercard of Honor V, costing The Motor City Machine Guns their championship opportunity.

Later in May at the Ring of Honor Wrestling television tapings, Hero came to the ring to address the Briscoe Brothers' father who was sitting at ringside as a Father's Day present, calling his children a mistake before elbowing him. This led to a no-disqualification championship rematch at the Death Before Dishonor VIII iPPV, where the Briscoes attacked Shane Hagadorn on their route to losing the blood-filled match after Hero again used the loaded elbow pad. After Hagadorn had been attacked, the Kings had sought revenge at Hate: Chapter II when they enrolled their valet Sara Del Rey in an intergender tag team match against the Briscoes and Del Rey's enemy Amazing Kong where Jay Briscoe pinned Hero. In August, the Briscoes earned another title opportunity along with two other teams by qualifying in the 2010 Tag Wars tournament. The Briscoes eliminated the All Night Express (Rhett Titus and Kenny King), but once again were undone by Hero's elbow pad. The Briscoes were given their last chance at the World Tag Team Championship on the October 25 episode of Ring of Honor Wrestling which the Kings won after Hagadorn low-blowed Jay Briscoe. After the match, Papa Briscoe jumped into the ring and speared Hagadorn until the Kings grabbed him and fled. On the 11 November episode of Ring of Honor Wrestling, Hagadorn threatened to sue Papa Briscoe but Jim Cornette reminded him Hero had attacked previously. Instead a non-title, Six-Man Tag Team match was suggested with both sides signing contracts.

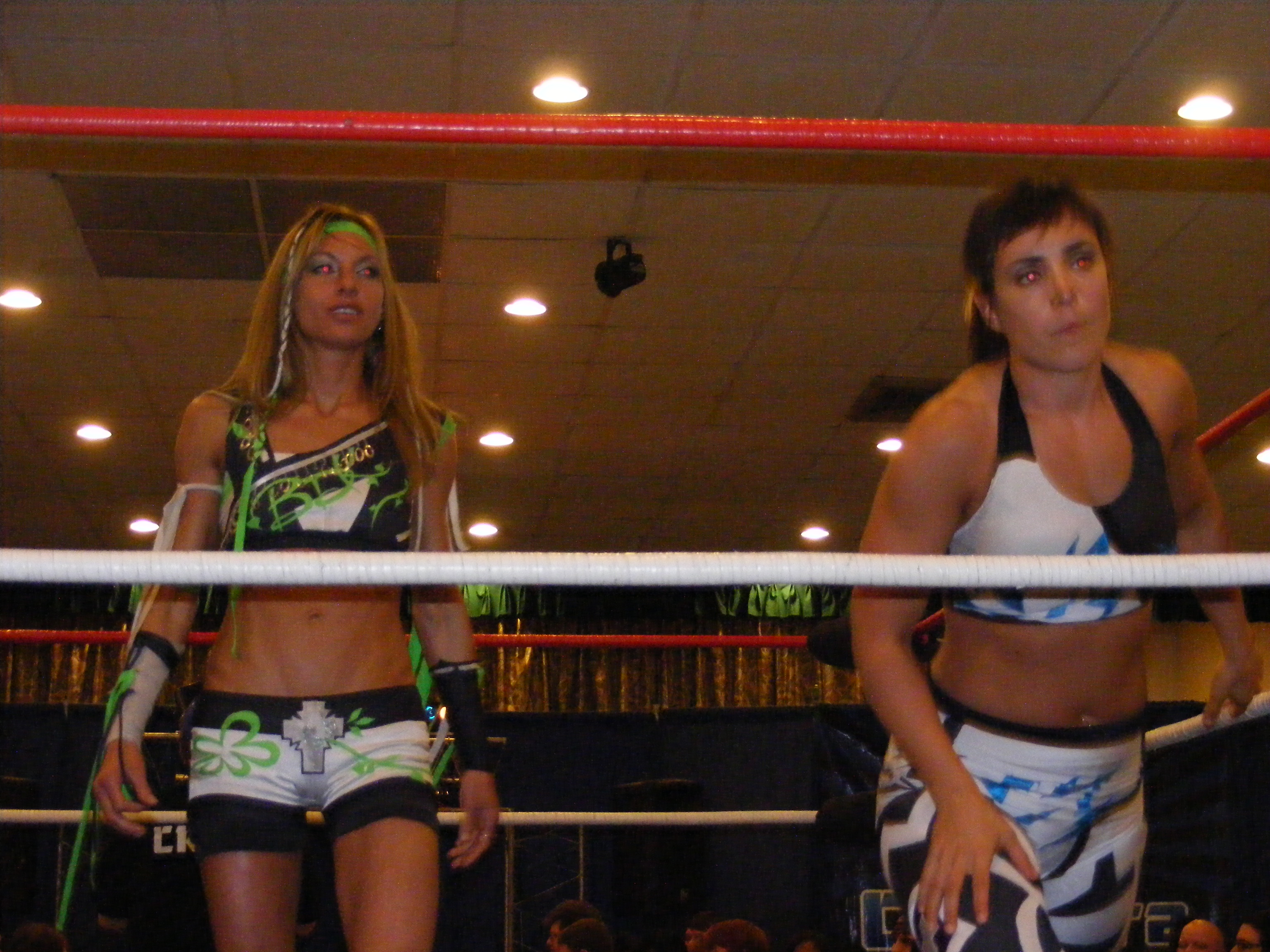
Daizee Haze (left) and Sara Del Rey (right) both picked their tag team partners going into Final Battle 2010.

Other matches on the card include a tag team match between Daizee Haze and Amazing Kong wrestling Sara Del Rey and Serena Deeb. At Bluegrass Brawl in July, Haze defeated Del Rey, but the challenge was prompted by a match on the 22 November episode of Ring of Honor Wrestling which went to a 10-minute time-limit draw. In an interview regarding the match, Haze expressed exasperation about the lack of a decision until Del Rey interrupted claiming she was moments from winning and that she needed more of a challenge. Haze assured Del Rey she would find more competition and a few days later Kong tweeted to confirm she would be Haze's partner. Kong had faced off against Del Rey at Supercard of Honor V and lost after Del Rey used Hero's loaded elbow pad. They main evented in a match with the Briscoes and Kings of Wrestling at Hate: Chapter II where Kong gained some revenge when her team defeated Del Rey's but it was not until Salvation in July where Kong would pin Del Rey herself. Incidentally, Kong and Haze teamed together against Del Rey and her partner Lacey at the Man Up PPV in September 2007 and picked up the win. On December 7, Del Rey confirmed her partner would be Serena Deeb, who had been in a number of ROH matches in 2007 and 2008.

ROH also announced in November IWGP Junior Heavyweight Tag Team Champion Kenny Omega would be returning for the first time since the Death Before Dishonor VIII iPPV to wrestle ROH World Television Champion Eddie Edwards in a non-title match. Days before the event, it was reported Omega had injured his ankle in training and would be replaced with Sonjay Dutt offering to be a replacement. A week before the event, it was revealed that Homicide would wrestle Christopher Daniels. Both men had wrestled in the company's first show The Era of Honor Begins and worked regularly for the company until 2007; coincidentally both returned in 2010 making unannounced returns at the iPPVs Glory By Honor IX and The Big Bang!, respectively, with a wish to win the ROH World Championship. This match would be their third in ROH, with Homicide winning both previous encounters. The last two matches were announced later that week, with Colt Cabana trying to move past the intense feud between Steen and Generico and offering an open challenge which was answered by T. J. Perkins. The final contest is a rematch between All Night Express and the team of Adam Cole and Kyle O'Reilly, with the Express winning their first encounter in October.

== Results ==
No.	Results	Stipulations	Times
1	The All Night Express (Kenny King and Rhett Titus) defeated Adam Cole and Kyle O'Reilly	Tag team match	10:00
2	Colt Cabana defeated T. J. Perkins	Singles match	08:00
3	Sara Del Rey and Serena Deeb defeated Amazing Kong and Daizee Haze	Tag team match	08:00
4	Eddie Edwards defeated Sonjay Dutt	Singles match	11:00
5	Homicide (with Julius Smokes) defeated Christopher Daniels	Singles match	11:00
6	The Briscoe Brothers (Jay Briscoe and Mark Briscoe) and Mike Briscoe defeated The Kings of Wrestling (Chris Hero and Claudio Castagnoli) and Shane Hagadorn (with Sara Del Rey)	Six-man tag team match	16:00
7	Roderick Strong (c) (with Truth Martini) defeated Davey Richards	Singles match for the ROH World Championship	30:30
8	El Generico defeated Kevin Steen	Unsanctioned Mask vs. Career Fight Without Honor; Since Steen lost he was forced to leave ROH, had Steen won El Generico would have had to unmask	31:10
(c) / – the champion(s) heading into the match

== See also ==
- 2010 in professional wrestling
- List of Ring of Honor pay-per-view events
