= S.C.U.M. (professional wrestling) =

Professional wrestling stable

S.C.U.M
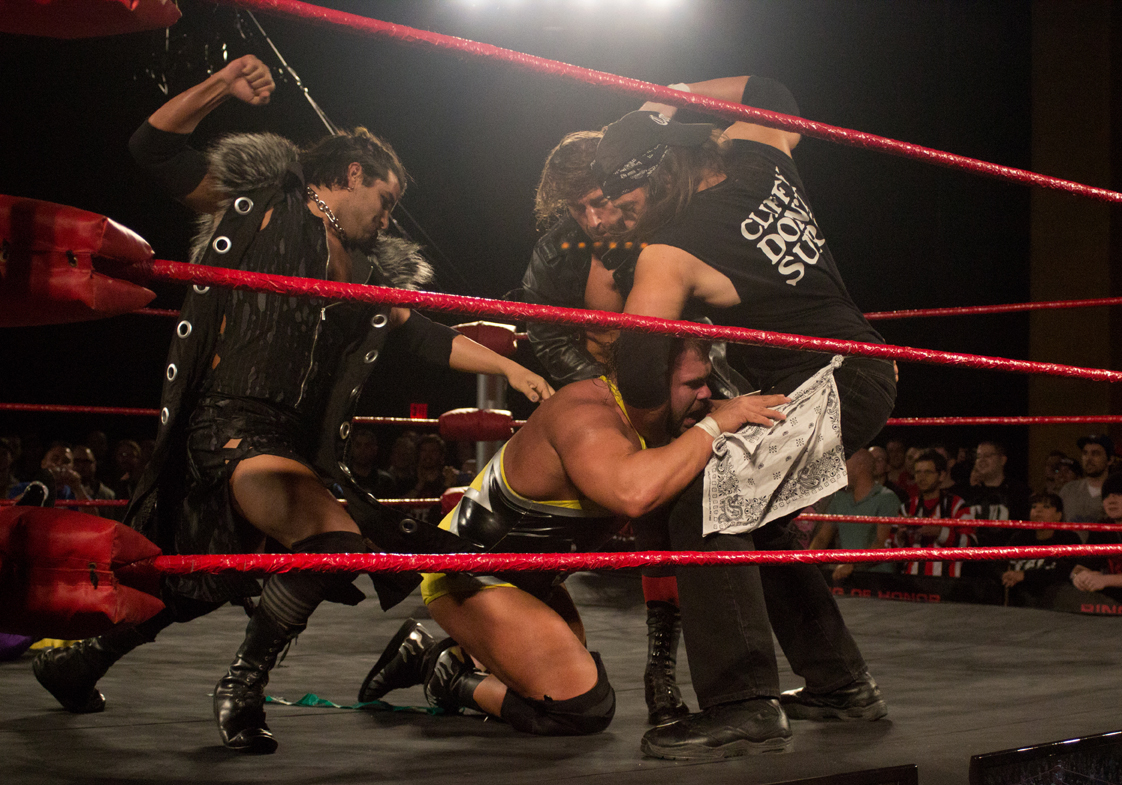
- S.C.U.M. attacking Michael Elgin at Supercard of Honor VII

Stable
- Members: Cliff Compton; Jimmy Jacobs; Jimmy Rave; Kevin Steen; Matt Hardy; Steve Corino; Rhett Titus; Rhino
- Name: S.C.U.M.
- Debut: May 12, 2012
- Disbanded: June 23, 2013
- Years active: 2012–2013

S.C.U.M. (Suffering, Chaos, Ugliness, and Mayhem) was a villainous professional wrestling stable in the promotion Ring of Honor. The stable was originally formed by Kevin Steen, Steve Corino and Jimmy Jacobs. On March 2, 2013, the number of members in the group grew predominantly, with the agenda to take control of ROH. The stable was disbanded on June 23, 2013, after losing to Team ROH in a Steel Cage Warfare match.

== History ==
=== Background ===
At Final Battle 2009, on December 19, Kevin Steen betrayed and began a feud with his former tag team partner El Generico, turning heel in the process. In 2010, Steve Corino joined Steen against Generico and Colt Cabana. At Final Battle 2010, on December 18, Steen lost a match against Generico that resulted in his departure from ROH. Prior to the outcome, on November 4, 2010 at an ROH taping, Kevin Steen's contract agreement with Ring of Honor ended due to financial budget concerns, which ultimately played a role within the stipulation of the match. Corino soon turned face and introduced his ally Jimmy Jacobs, both claiming that they were good people that could reach out to Steen, and asked ROH for a second chance for Steen. However, Steen, who wanted to redeem himself but was opposed by ROH and its security that came to evict him from the building, ended up turning on Corino upon his return at Best in the World 2011 on June 26, sparking a revolt against ROH which fell into conflict with Executive Producer Jim Cornette, who vowed to rid the company of Steen. Furthermore, Steen threatened legal action if he was not reinstated, leading to Steen ultimately defeating Corino on December 21 at Final Battle 2011 to win a contract from ROH. At Showdown in the Sun weekend, on March 30, 2012, Steen defeated El Generico, with help from Jimmy Jacobs in a Last Man Standing match. On May 12 at Border Wars, Steen defeated Davey Richards to win the ROH World Championship for the first time. Following the match, Corino entered the ring and hugged Steen and Jacobs, as the three men went on to form a stable later named S.C.U.M. (Suffering, Chaos, Ugliness, and Mayhem).

=== Feud with Ring of Honor ===
As ROH World Champion, Kevin Steen and S.C.U.M embroiled in a feud with the ROH Executive Producer Jim Cornette and the company as a whole. While Steen defended the World Title against various wrestlers chosen by Cornette including the Chikara Grand Champion Eddie Kingston and Rhino, Corino and Jacobs defeated Charlie Haas and Rhett Titus in the finals of a tournament to win the vacant ROH World Tag Team Championship on September 15 at Death Before Dishonor X: State of Emergency.

On October 6, 2012 at an ROH taping, a title match between Kevin Steen and Jay Lethal ended in a no contest in Lethal's home state of New Jersey, where thereafter, Steen spat at Lethal's parents, who were seated at ringside. Due to the match stipulation, Lethal was prohibited from challenging Steen again for the title as long as Steen remained champion. On December 16 at Final Battle 2012: Doomsday, Corino and Jacobs lost the titles to The Briscoe Brothers and Steen successfully defended the ROH World Championship against the returning El Generico in a ladder match. That same night, following Lethal's match with Rhino, Rhino joined S.C.U.M. by helping Jacobs and Corino attack Lethal. Soon after, Lethal tried to reason with new ROH Commissioner Nigel McGuinness for a match against Steen, but McGuinness stated that Steen had to be the one to give Lethal the match since Lethal was not allowed anymore shots at Steen and the world title. After Jim Cornette's departure due to an attack from Lethal, Steen agreed to give him the rematch.

On March 2, 2013, at the 11th Anniversary Show, Kevin Steen overcame the challenge of Jay Lethal in a grudge match to retain the ROH World Championship. During the match, Corino and Jacobs tried to help Steen, but they were stopped by Commissioner McGuinness. After the match, S.C.U.M. member Rhino connected with his Gore finisher on Lethal. Following that, several ROH wrestlers came out to the ring to rescue Lethal, but were outnumbered by the revelation of new S.C.U.M. members Cliff Compton, Rhett Titus, Jimmy Rave and Matt Hardy. Corino then declared that the group would continue to grow and destroy ROH, making a statement by destroying a flag of ROH. On April 6, the day after Kevin Steen had lost the ROH World Championship to Jay Briscoe, the rest of S.C.U.M. turned on him, with Corino becoming the head mouthpiece of the group and Hardy becoming the wrestler of whom the group revolved around. On June 10, 2013, it was reported that Jimmy Rave had left ROH. At the June 23 tapings of Ring of Honor Wrestling, S.C.U.M. was forced to disband, after being defeated by Team ROH in a Steel Cage Warfare match.

== Members ==
=== Formers ===
Member		Joined	Left
Kevin Steen	*	May 12, 2012	April 6, 2013
Jimmy Jacobs	*	May 12, 2012	June 23, 2013
Steve Corino	*	May 12, 2012	June 23, 2013
Rhino		December 16, 2012	June 23, 2013
Cliff Compton		March 2, 2013	June 23, 2013
Jimmy Rave		March 2, 2013	June 10, 2013
Matt Hardy		March 2, 2013	June 23, 2013
Rhett Titus		March 2, 2013	June 23, 2013

== Championship and accomplishments ==
- Ring of Honor
  - ROH World Championship (1 time) – Steen
  - ROH World Tag Team Championship (1 time) – Corino and Jacobs
  - ROH World Tag Team Championship Tournament (2012) – Corino and Jacobs
