= Kevin Owens =

Canadian professional wrestler (born 1984)

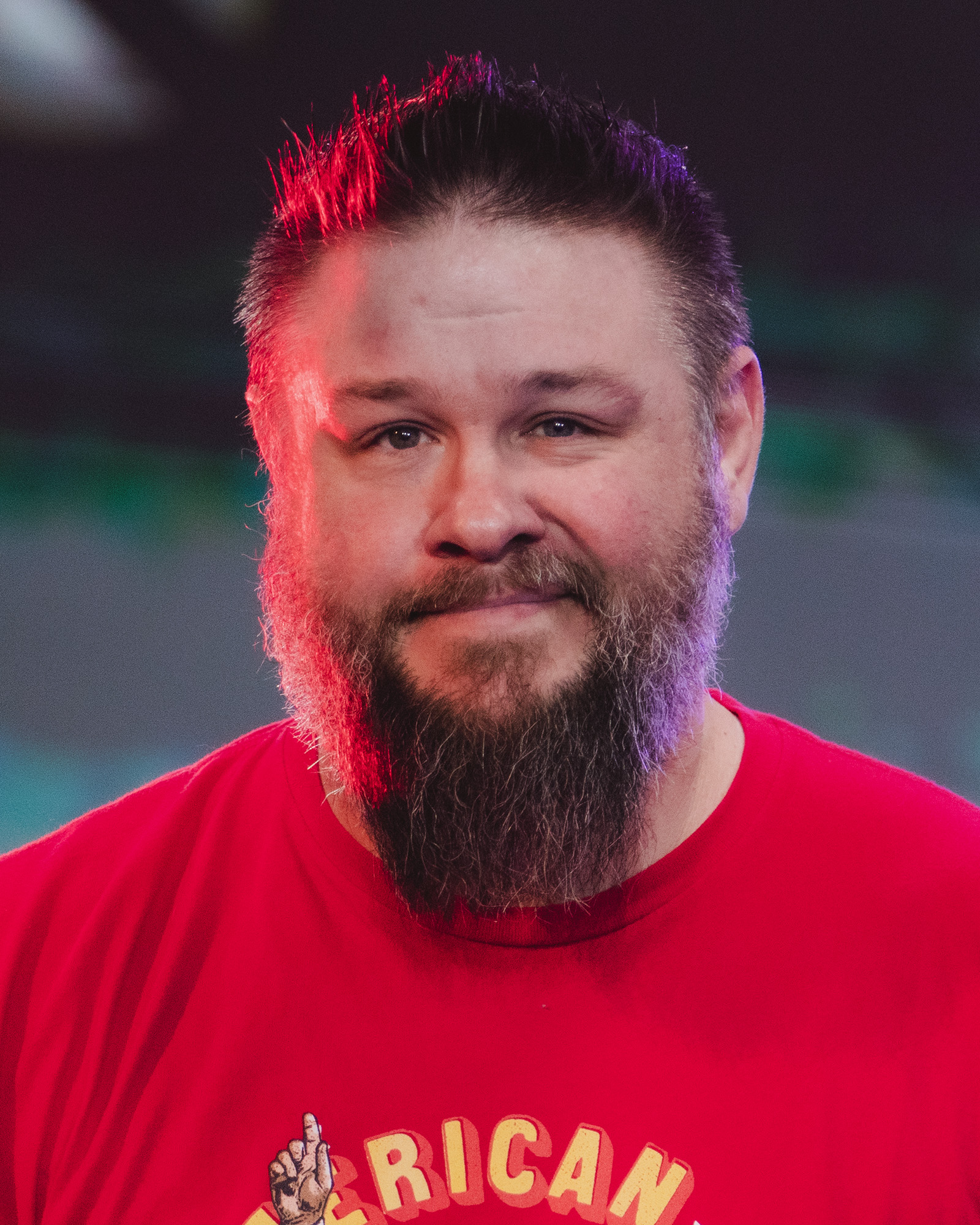
- Owens in 2026

Personal information
- Born: Kevin Yanick Steen; May 7, 1984 (age 42) Saint-Jean-sur-Richelieu, Quebec, Canada
- Spouse: Karina Lamer (m. 2007)
- Children: 2

Professional wrestling career
- Ring name(s): Kevin Owens; Kevin Steen
- Billed height: 6 ft 0 in (183 cm)
- Billed weight: 242 lb (110 kg)
- Billed from: Marieville, Quebec, Canada
- Trained by: Jacques Rougeau; Pierre Carl Ouellet; Serge Jodoin; Terry Taylor
- Debut: May 7, 2000

Kevin Yanick Steen (born May 7, 1984) is a Canadian professional wrestler. He is signed to WWE, where he performs on the SmackDown brand under the ring name Kevin Owens.

Steen began his career in 2000 at age 16. Prior to joining WWE in late 2014, he wrestled under his birth name for Ring of Honor (ROH), where he held the ROH World Championship and ROH World Tag Team Championship. He also wrestled extensively on the independent circuit for 14 years, most notably in Pro Wrestling Guerrilla (PWG), where he held the PWG World Championship a record three times, as well as the PWG World Tag Team Championship on three occasions. Steen also competed for International Wrestling Syndicate (IWS), where he held the IWS World Heavyweight Championship three times, and Combat Zone Wrestling (CZW), where he held the CZW Iron Man Championship.

Steen signed with WWE in August 2014, and joined their developmental branch NXT before debuting on the main roster in May 2015. In WWE, he has won nine championships – the NXT Championship once, the Universal Championship once, the Intercontinental Championship twice, the United States Championship three times, and the Undisputed WWE Tag Team Championship (consisting of the Raw and SmackDown Tag Team Championships) once with Sami Zayn, which made Owens WWE's 23rd overall Grand Slam Champion. He has headlined multiple pay-per-view events for WWE, including the company's flagship annual event, WrestleMania, on two occasions (38 - Night 1 and 39 - Night 1).

== Early life ==
Kevin Yanick Steen was born on May 7, 1984, in Saint-Jean-sur-Richelieu, Quebec, Canada, and raised in Marieville, 29 kilometres (18 mi) east of Montreal. He is of French-Canadian and Irish descent and speaks French as his first language. He learned to speak English by mimicking everything he heard while watching WWF Monday Night Raw. Steen participated in ice hockey, soccer, and baseball, but never considered developing a career out of them—especially soccer, after suffering an injury at age 11—and instead considered becoming a professional wrestler after he and his father watched a videotape of the match between Diesel and Shawn Michaels at WrestleMania XI.

== Professional wrestling career ==
=== Early career (2000–2004) ===
When Steen was 14, his parents allowed him to start training with Serge Jodoin, a wrestler based in Quebec. The following year, Steen began training with Jacques Rougeau. He also trained with Terry Taylor, whom he has called his "main trainer". Steen had his first match on May 7, 2000 (his 16th birthday) in L'Assomption, Quebec. Steen trained with Rougeau and wrestled for Rougeau's promotion for four years, before beginning to wrestle with several other Canadian promotions.

=== International Wrestling Syndicate (2003–2009) ===
On August 16, 2003, Steen made his International Wrestling Syndicate (IWS) debut at Born to Bleed. At Blood, Sweat and Beers on October 18, Pierre Carl Ouellet defeated Steen and El Generico in a triple threat match. On November 15, at Payback's A Bitch, El Generico defeated Steen in their first-ever singles match against each other.

IWS held its 5th anniversary show "V" on June 15, 2004, at Le SPAG, where El Generico won his first IWS World Heavyweight Championship, only to have Steen cash in his number one contendership (won earlier that night against Excess 69) on El Generico, also winning his first IWS World Heavyweight Championship. Steen's first title reign marked a pivotal milestone in the history of the promotion when he became the first IWS World Heavyweight Champion to internationally defend the title, defeating Roderick Strong on October 30 in Rahway, New Jersey for Jersey All Pro Wrestling (JAPW). On September 22, 2007, at Blood, Sweat & Beers, Steen defeated Jay Briscoe.

On March 22, 2008, at Know Your Enemies, Steen won his second IWS World Heavyweight Championship by defeating Max Boyer and former champion El Generico in a 3-Way match. On May 24, at Freedom to Fight, Steen became the first person to hold two IWS titles simultaneously when he defeated Boyer to win the IWS Canadian Championship in an IWS Championship Unification match.

=== Combat Zone Wrestling (2004–2006, 2008, 2014) ===
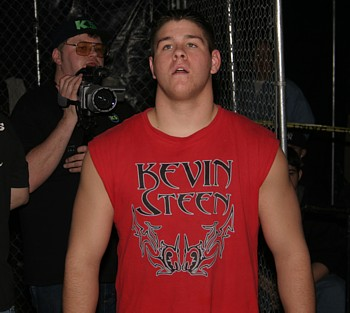
Steen entering Viking Hall for his match at CZW Cage of Death VI on December 11, 2004

Steen made his Combat Zone Wrestling (CZW) debut on September 10, 2004, at High Stakes II, where SeXXXy Eddy defeated Steen, El Generico and Excess 69 in an IWS 4-Way match which was unofficially chosen as "CZW Match of the Year". On May 14, 2005, Steen took part in the "CZW Best of the Best" tournament, defeating Kenny The Bastard in the first round and Chris Hero in the second round to advance to the finals, where he lost a fatal four-way match involving B-Boy, Super Dragon, and Mike Quackenbush.

At Deja Vu 3 on August 13, Steen defeated Franky The Mobster to win the CZW Iron Man Championship. He held the championship for 364 days until losing it on August 12, 2006, to female wrestler LuFisto in a steel cage match at CZW Trapped involving The Canadians, The Blackout, The Forefathers of CZW, and Eddie Kingston. He then departed for a tour with Dragon Gate and did not return to CZW until February 2008, when he made a one-time appearance and fought Vordell Walker to a no contest.

Steen returned to CZW in April 2014, competing in two matches against Masato Tanaka and D. J. Hyde, respectively.

=== Pro Wrestling Guerrilla (2005–2008) ===
While wrestling in CZW, Steen also began working for Pro Wrestling Guerrilla (PWG). On May 13, 2005, at Jason Takes PWG, Steen was entered into his first feud in PWG, when he helped Excalibur defeat Super Dragon in a Guerrilla Warfare match, in the process revealing himself as the fake Super Dragon, who had been attacking the real one the past few months. On August 6, 2005, Steen won the PWG Championship after defeating A.J. Styles at Zombies Shouldn't Run. Steen held the title for nearly four months before losing the championship to Joey Ryan at Chanukah Chaos (The C's Are Silent), following interference from Super Dragon. Steen's feud with Super Dragon ended on December 16, 2005, at Astonishing X-Mas, where he was defeated in a Guerrilla Warfare match.

In 2006, Steen began teaming with El Generico, and they began to pursue the PWG World Tag Team Championship. On July 29, 2007, at Giant-Size Annual No. #4, Steen and Generico defeated the reigning champions PAC and Roderick Strong to become the PWG World Tag Team Champions. They successfully defended the belts for almost three months before ultimately losing them to the team of Davey Richards and Super Dragon on October 27 in England as part of PWG's "European Vacation II" tour. The next night, Steen teamed with PAC in an attempt to regain the belts from Dragon and Richards, announcing before the match that if he lost, he would leave the company indefinitely. Steen and PAC lost, leading to Steen leaving PWG.

However, Steen returned to PWG and, along with El Generico, won the title for a second time, this time from The Dynasty (Joey Ryan and Scott Lost) on March 21, 2008, in an impromptu match. Steen and Generico became the first team in PWG history to be a part of the annual Dynamite Duumvirate Tag Team Title Tournament to defend the belts in each match they had. In the tournament finals, they lost the title to Jack Evans and Roderick Strong, thus ending their second reign. Ultimately, Steen left PWG after interest from ROH increased. According to Steen, he could not wrestle for ROH and PWG at the same time and chose ROH because of the money and the exposure.

=== Ring of Honor (2007–2014) ===
==== Storyline with El Generico (2007–2010) ====
On February 17, 2007, Steen, as a heel, returned to Ring of Honor at Fifth Year Festival: Philly, teaming with the face El Generico in a losing effort to the Briscoe Brothers. On April 14, Mark Briscoe returned in the middle of a match between Steen and Generico and his brother Jay and Erick Stevens at Fighting Spirit. Mark was attacked by the duo, however, and was pinned by Steen after a package piledriver. At Respect is Earned on July 1, Steen and El Generico defeated The Irish Airborne (Jake and Dave Crist), Pelle Primeau and Mitch Franklin, and Jimmy Rave and Adam Pearce in a Tag Team Scramble dark match. That same night, Steen and El Generico brawled with the Briscoe Brothers, ending with Mark Briscoe suffering a mild concussion from a steel chair shot. At Driven on September 21, the Briscoe Brothers defeated Steen and El Generico to retain the ROH World Tag Team Championship. At Death Before Dishonor V Night 1 on August 10, they defeated the Briscoes in a non-title Boston Street Fight. Steen and Generico then suffered three consecutive losses to the Briscoes at Caged Rage on August 24 in a steel cage match, Manhattan Mayhem II on August 25 in a two out of three falls match, and Man Up on November 30 in ROH's first-ever ladder match.

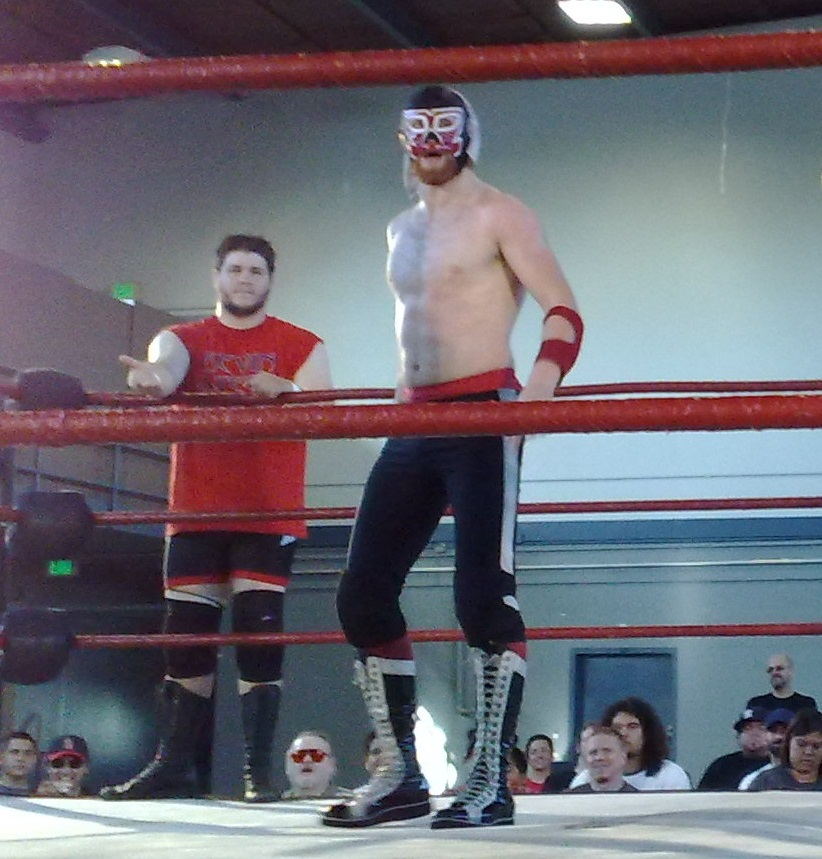
Steen (left) and Generico (right) teaming together in 2008

At Up For Grabs on June 6, 2008, Steen and Generico participated in a one night tournament to crown new ROH World Tag Team Champions, defeating Go Shiozaki and ROH World Champion Nigel McGuinness in the first round, Chris Hero and Adam Pearce in the second round, but losing to Jimmy Jacobs and Tyler Black in the finals. On July 25, Steen faced McGuinness for the ROH World Championship at the company's debut show in Toronto, Ontario, Canada, but lost. At a pay-per-view taping in Boston on September 19, Steen and Generico defeated The Age of the Fall to win the ROH World Tag Team Championship. They lost the championship to The American Wolves (Eddie Edwards and Davey Richards) at a television taping on April 10, 2009.

On December 19, at Final Battle, ROH's first live pay-per-view, Steen turned heel by attacking his tag team partner El Generico after a loss to The Young Bucks. Steen then found a new partner in Steve Corino. At The Big Bang! on April 3, 2010, Generico and Cabana defeated Steen and Corino via disqualification, when Steen used a chair on his former partner. On June 19, at Death Before Dishonor VIII, Steen defeated Generico in a singles match. On September 11, at Glory By Honor IX, Generico and Cabana defeated Steen and Corino in a Double Chain match, when Cabana forced Corino to tap out. After the match, Steen attacked El Generico and unmasked him. At Final Battle on December 18, Steen and Generico ended their year–long feud in an unsanctioned Fight Without Honor, where Steen put his ROH career on the line against Generico's mask. Despite Steen not liking the idea because he would lose money if he lost, he agreed to the match, because he thought ROH would use Generico as a top wrestler after the feud. El Generico won the match and thus forced Steen out of ROH. The feud was voted by Wrestling Observer Newsletter as the best feud of the year.

Prior to the outcome, on November 4, Kevin Steen's contract agreement with Ring of Honor ended due to financial budget concerns, which ultimately played a role within the stipulations of the match. Steen wrote most of the El Generico rivalry storyline himself, though he claims that his poor relationship with new booker Jim Cornette, who had little interest in either Steen or Generico, resulted in a great deal of frustration for him. During the feud, ROH booker Adam Pearce promised Steen he would main event Final Battle, but Cornette made Davey Richards-Eddie Edwards the main event and Steen-Generico after the event. Steen also claims that Cornette "froze" him out of ROH, believing he was also keeping the promotion's president Cary Silkin in the dark on when Steen would be brought back.

==== ROH World Champion (2011–2013) ====
When Steen was pulled out of ROH events, ROH President Cary Silkin paid him every month. Cornette told Steen he would be brought back a few months later, so Steen lost 40 lb (18 kg), but when ROH was sold, Cornette told him to wait another six months. Steen was unhappy and his weight jumped to 291 lb (132 kg). His contract expired in February 2011. After signing a new contract with the promotion, Steen returned to Ring of Honor on June 26, 2011, at Best in the World, being introduced by Corino, who had turned face shortly after Steen's departure from the promotion and claimed that he needed redemption as well. However, ROH officials forced him to leave the arena before he could show that he was a changed man. After Corino was defeated by Michael Elgin, Steen ran in to save him from a beatdown at the hands of the House of Truth, but ended up turning on him and his sponsor Jimmy Jacobs. Afterward, Steen was dragged out of the arena, while Jim Cornette swore that he would never again wrestle for ROH. The original idea was to introduce Steen as a rehab wrestler. However, Steen turned down the idea, because he did not "want to look like The Bravado Brothers". Though Steen was booked as the heel of the storyline, the fans took his side and instead booed Cornette. The storyline continued on July 22, when Steen invaded ROH's official message board, writing posts praising Pro Wrestling Guerrilla. On September 15, ROH's message board was "hacked" to redirect to a video, where Steen announced his intention of attending ROH's Death Before Dishonor IX the following weekend.

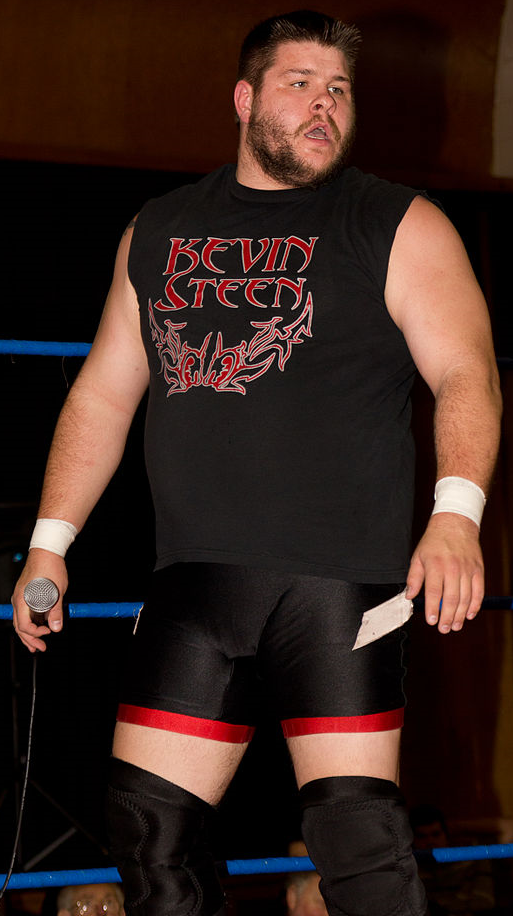
Steen at a GCW event in December 2011

At the event on September 17, Steen interrupted a match between El Generico and Jacobs and called out Steve Corino, who was at the time wrestling in Japan, before powerbombing Jacobs on the ring apron. Steen was then confronted by Cornette and ROH president Cary Silkin, whom he tried to Package Piledrive, before being ushered out of the arena by security. On the November 5 episode of Ring of Honor Wrestling, Steen reappeared with Ohio Valley Wrestling talent Christian Mascagni as his legal adviser, threatening Cornette and Ring of Honor with legal action unless he was reinstated within three weeks. On the December 3 episode of Ring of Honor Wrestling, Steen was granted a match against Corino, with his ROH future on the line at Final Battle on December 23, where Steen defeated Corino, thus granting back his career in ROH. Afterward, he delivered a package piledriver to Jacobs, before putting El Generico through a table with the same maneuver. At the end of the evening, he confronted ROH World Champion Davey Richards. On March 4, 2012, at the 10th Anniversary Show, Steen defeated Jimmy Jacobs in a No Holds Barred match and ended the pay-per-view by having another confrontation with Richards. Steen continued his win streak during the Showdown in the Sun weekend, first defeating El Generico, with help from Jacobs, in a Last Man Standing match on March 30 and then Eddie Edwards in a singles match on March 31.

On May 12, at Border Wars, Steen defeated Richards to win the ROH World Championship for the first time, making him the first Canadian to hold the championship. Following the match, Steve Corino entered the ring and hugged Steen and Jacobs; the three men went on to form a stable later named S.C.U.M. (Suffering, Chaos, Ugliness, and Mayhem). Steen made his first successful title defense on June 15, defeating Edwards. On June 24, at Best in the World 2012: Hostage Crisis, Steen defeated Richards to retain the ROH World Championship. At Boiling Point on August 11, Steen successfully defended his title against Chikara Grand Champion Eddie Kingston. On September 15, at Death Before Dishonor X: State of Emergency, Steen made another successful title defense against Rhino. On October 6, a title match between Steen and Jay Lethal ended in a no contest in Lethal's home state of New Jersey, after which Steen spat at Lethal's parents, who were sitting at ringside. Seven days later at the following internet pay-per-view, Glory By Honor XI: The Unbreakable Hope, Steen made a successful title defense against Michael Elgin. Afterwards, Steen was delivered a box, which contained El Generico's mask. On December 16, at Final Battle 2012: Doomsday, Steen successfully defended the ROH World Championship against the returning El Generico in a ladder match. On March 2, 2013, at the 11th Anniversary Show, Steen defeated Jay Lethal in a grudge match to retain the ROH World Championship. On April 5, at Supercard of Honor VII, Steen lost the ROH World Championship to Jay Briscoe.

==== Final feuds (2013–2014) ====
At the following night's tapings of Ring of Honor Wrestling, S.C.U.M. turned on Steen, with Corino announcing that he would not be seen in ROH again. Steen, however, returned to ROH on May 4, now working as a face and replacing Jay Lethal in a tag team match, where he and Michael Elgin faced S.C.U.M.'s Cliff Compton and Jimmy Jacobs. The match ended with Jacobs pinning Steen for the win, after which Elgin walked out on him. Steen continued his rivalry with S.C.U.M. on June 22 at Best in the World 2013, where he was defeated by Matt Hardy in a No Disqualification match. The following day, Steen replaced The Briscoes due to injuries in a Steel Cage Warfare match and forced his former stable out of ROH, despite interference from Corino and Hardy, when he pinned Jacobs to win the match and disband S.C.U.M.

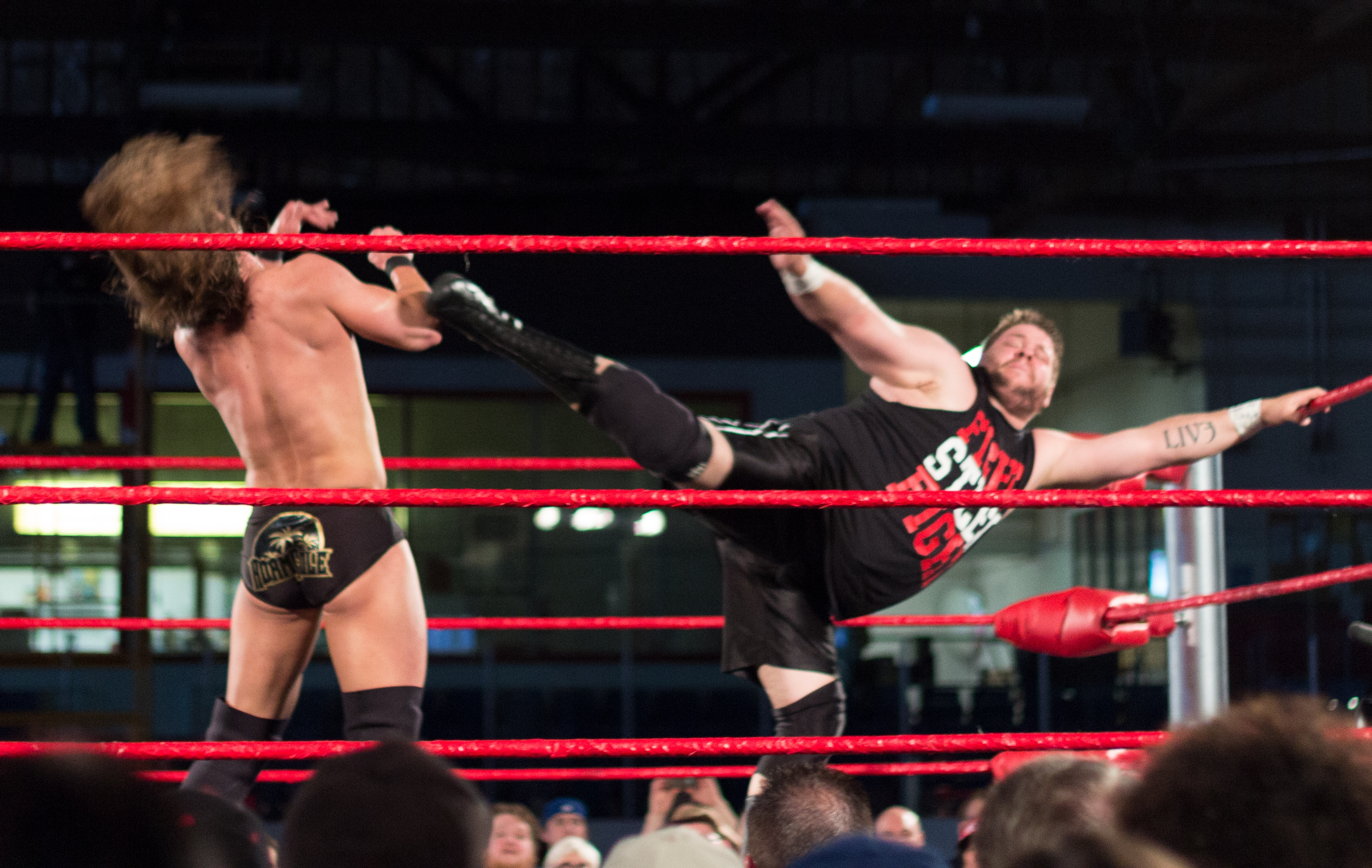
Steen superkicking Adam Cole at a Ring of Honor taping event in 2014

On August 3, Steen entered a tournament for the vacant ROH World Championship, defeating Brian Kendrick in his first round match. On August 17, Steen advanced to the semifinals of the tournament with a win over Roderick Strong. On September 20, at Death Before Dishonor XI, Steen was eliminated from the tournament by Elgin. Steen then started feuding with Michael Bennett, who defeated Steen on October 26 at Glory By Honor XII, following a distraction from his girlfriend Maria Kanellis. On December 14, at Final Battle 2013, Steen defeated Bennett in a stretcher match, where the loser would be forced to stop using the piledriver. On February 8, 2014, Steen earned a shot at the ROH World Championship by defeating Jay Lethal, Michael Elgin and Tommaso Ciampa in a four-way number one contender's match. Steen received his title match on May 10 in Toronto at Global Wars, but lost to the defending champion, Adam Cole.

After losing to Shinsuke Nakamura at the Ring of Honor/New Japan Pro-Wrestling co-produced War of the Worlds iPPV on May 17, Steen announced he was leaving ROH. This led to him being insulted and attacked by Silas Young. After defeating Young on June 22 at Best in the World 2014, Steen announced that his contract was up in a "month and a half". At the July 19 Ring of Honor Wrestling tapings, Steen defeated Steve Corino in his final ROH match.

=== Return to PWG (2010–2014) ===
When Steen left ROH in 2010, his friend Super Dragon asked him to wrestle in PWG, to which Steen agreed. On December 11, 2010, Steen wrestled Akira Tozawa for his first PWG win in two years. He then returned to a more prominent role in the company after a few sporadic years, having only made five appearances between 2009 and 2010. On January 29, 2011, Steen was defeated by Chris Hero at PWG's annual WrestleReunion-sponsored event. Later that evening, after a four-way tag team match to determine which of four teams would enter the 2011 DDT4 tournament, Steen ran out to attack the eventual winners, the RockNES Monsters (Johnny Goodtime and Johnny Yuma), before declaring his intention of winning the DDT4 tournament. On February 2, 2011, it was announced that Steen would be teaming with Tozawa for the tournament, which took place on March 4. In their first round match, Steen and Tozawa, known collectively as the Nightmare Violence Connection, scored an upset victory over the Briscoe Brothers (Jay and Mark Briscoe). After another upset victory over the ROH World Tag Team Champions, Kings of Wrestling (Hero and Claudio Castagnoli), Steen and Tozawa made it to the finals of the tournament, where they were defeated by The Young Bucks (Matt and Nick Jackson). On July 23, at PWG's eighth anniversary show, Steen first defeated PAC in a singles match, before teaming with CIMA to defeat PWG World Tag Team Champions, The Young Bucks, in a non-title match. After Castagnoli had defeated Hero in the main event of the evening to retain the PWG World Championship, Steen challenged him to a match and, in his third match of the night, defeated him to win the PWG World Championship for the second time. At the following event on August 20, Steen entered the 2011 Battle of Los Angeles, defeating Dave Finlay and Eddie Edwards in his first round and semifinal matches. Later that same night, Steen was defeated in the finals by old rival El Generico. On September 10, Steen made his first PWG World Championship defense, defeating former champion Davey Richards.

On October 22, Steen lost the PWG World Championship to El Generico in a ladder match, following interference from The Young Bucks. After the match Super Dragon made his first appearance in over three years by saving Steen with the two accepting The Young Bucks' challenge for a Guerrilla Warfare match. On December 10, Steen and Dragon, known collectively as "Appetite for Destruction", defeated The Young Bucks in a Guerrilla Warfare match to win the PWG World Tag Team Championship. On March 17, Steen defeated El Generico and Eddie Edwards in a three-way match to win the PWG World Championship for the third time. Steen made his first title defense on April 21, defeating Sami Callihan in an open challenge. On May 25, Steen successfully defended the PWG World Championship against Brian Cage-Taylor. That same night, Steen and Dragon were stripped of the PWG World Tag Team Championship, after Dragon was sidelined with a heel fracture. On July 21, at Threemendous III, PWG's ninth anniversary event, Steen made his third successful defense of the PWG World Championship against Willie Mack. On September 1, Steen was eliminated from the 2012 Battle of Los Angeles in the first round by Ricochet, following a distraction from Brian Cage. After having his championship belt stolen from him by the 2012 Battle of Los Angeles winner Adam Cole, Steen successfully defended the title in a three-way match against Michael Elgin and Ricochet on October 27, after which he challenged Cole to a match for December 1, where Steen lost the PWG World Championship to Cole in a Guerrilla Warfare match.

After El Generico had agreed to a deal with WWE, he and Steen reunited one more time on January 12, 2013, by entering the 2013 Dynamite Duumvirate Tag Team Title Tournament. After wins over the Briscoe Brothers and Future Shock (Adam Cole and Kyle O'Reilly), they were defeated in the finals of the tournament by The Young Bucks. On August 31, at the 2013 Battle of Los Angeles, Steen turned heel and formed a new stable named The Mount Rushmore of Wrestling with PWG World Champion Adam Cole and PWG World Tag Team Champions The Young Bucks. On July 26, 2014, Steen was defeated by Trevor Lee in his PWG farewell match.

=== WWE ===
==== NXT Champion (2014–2015) ====
Before signing with WWE, Steen had attended One Night Stand in 2006, sporting a PWG shirt, and again for Breaking Point in 2009 in Montreal.

On August 12, 2014, WWE announced that Steen had signed with them and was due to report to their developmental system NXT on August 25. His new ring name had only the surname changed to Owens as a tribute to his son Owen (who himself is named after Owen Hart), and NXT began airing promotional videos from November 20 to hype his upcoming debut.

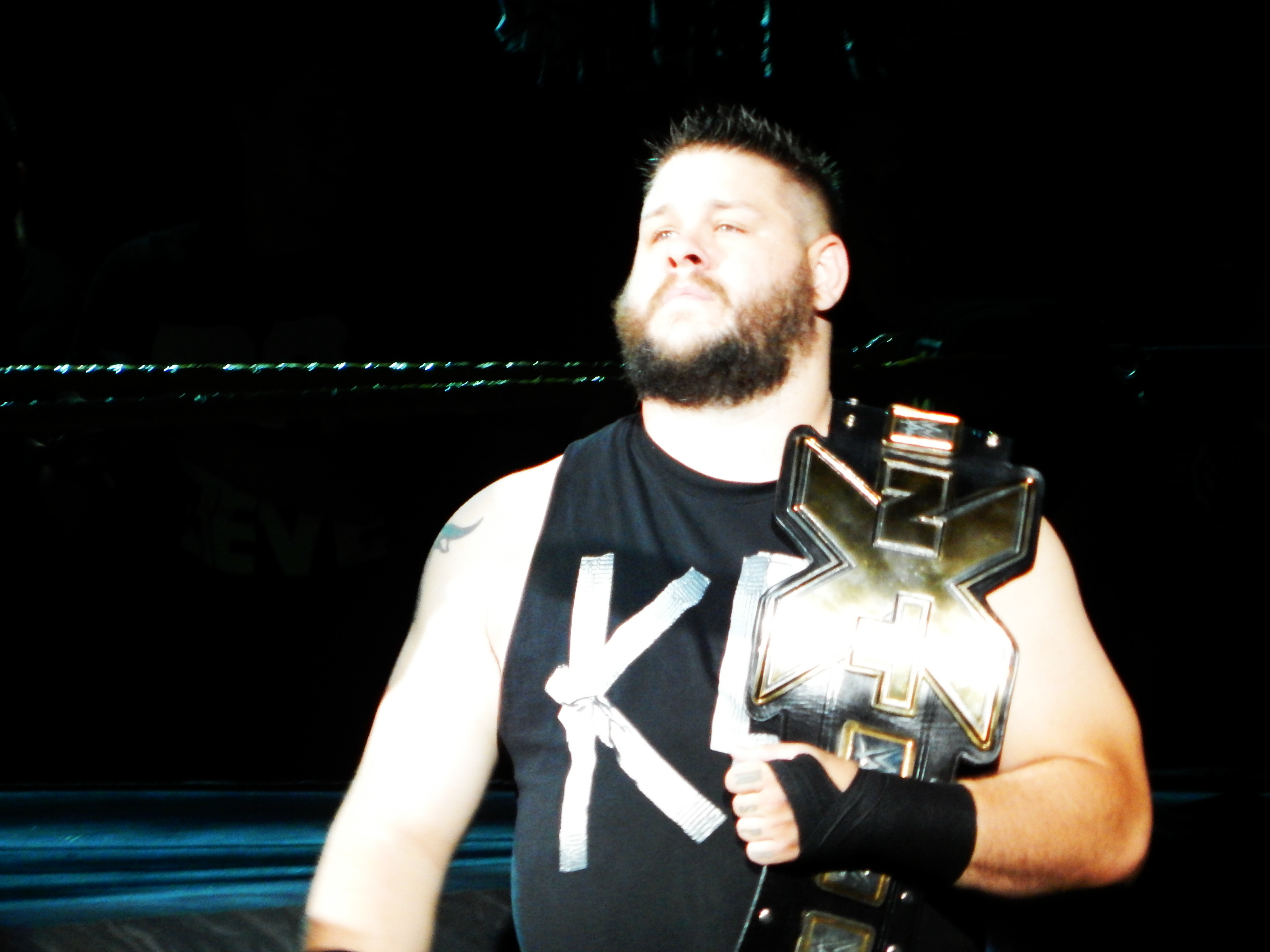
Owens won the NXT Championship only two months after his debut

At NXT TakeOver: R Evolution on December 11, Owens defeated CJ Parker in his debut match. Later that night, when Sami Zayn (the former El Generico) won the NXT Championship, Owens attacked him, establishing himself as a heel and starting a feud with Zayn. On February 11, 2015, at NXT TakeOver: Rival, Owens defeated Zayn via referee stoppage to win the title after repeatedly powerbombing a disorientated Zayn. With this win, he became the quickest superstar to win the NXT Championship from his debut, a record that stood for over nine years until it was surpassed by Ethan Page in July 2024. On the March 25 episode of NXT, he successfully defended the NXT Championship against Finn Bálor. At NXT TakeOver: Unstoppable on May 20, Owens's rematch for the title against Zayn ended in a no contest after Owens continued to beat down an injured Zayn, until the debuting Samoa Joe stopped him. Owens also made appearances on the main roster as NXT Champion, successfully defending the title against Zack Ryder during an open challenge on the June 4 episode of SmackDown, Neville on the June 8 episode of Raw and Heath Slater on the June 12 episode of Main Event.

On the July 4 WWE Network special, The Beast in the East event held in Tokyo, Japan, Owens lost the NXT Championship to Bálor, ending his reign at 143 days. At NXT TakeOver: Brooklyn on August 22, Owens failed to regain the title from Bálor in a ladder match in what would be his final match in NXT.

==== Intercontinental Champion (2015–2016) ====
"Love him or hate him, you can't deny his impact on the first six months of 2015 – or wonder how high he'll climb by year's end. It's wrestling, folks. It's Kevin Owens".

— Kenny Herzog of Rolling Stone in July 2015

While still the NXT Champion, Owens made his unannounced main roster debut on the May 18 episode of Raw, responding to John Cena's United States Championship open challenge. However, instead of competing in the match, he attacked Cena and stomped on the United States title in a show of disrespect, setting up a non-title match between the two at Elimination Chamber on May 31, which Owens won cleanly by pinfall. At Money in the Bank on June 14, Owens lost to Cena, after which he powerbombed Cena onto the ring apron. Owens, no longer NXT Champion later challenged Cena to a match for the United States Championship at Battleground on July 19, which Cena won by submission, thus ending their feud.

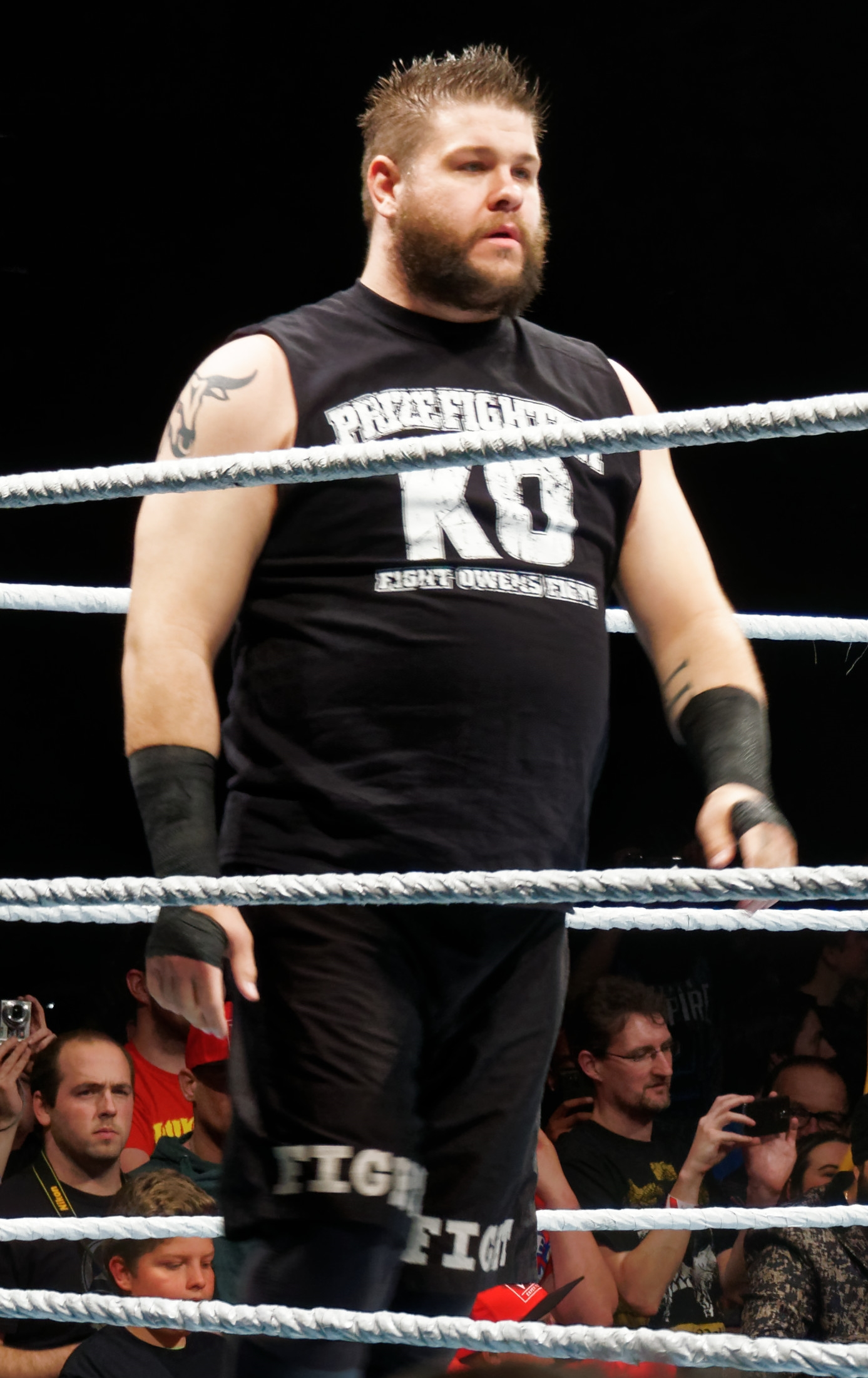
Owens in April 2016

After defeating Cesaro on August 23 at SummerSlam, Owens defeated Ryback at Night of Champions on September 20 to win the Intercontinental Championship, his first singles title on the main roster. On October 3, Owens's first title defense came on the WWE Network special, Live from Madison Square Garden, defeating Chris Jericho. At Hell in a Cell on October 25, Owens defeated Ryback to retain the title. Owens took part in the tournament for the vacant WWE World Heavyweight Championship, in which he defeated Titus O'Neil and Neville, but lost to Dean Ambrose in the semifinals at Survivor Series on November 22. On December 13, Owens lost the Intercontinental Championship to Ambrose at TLC: Tables, Ladders & Chairs, ending his reign at 84 days. He failed to regain the title on the January 7, 2016 episode of SmackDown and at Royal Rumble on January 24 in a Last Man Standing match. Later that night, he entered his first Royal Rumble match at number 18, eliminating AJ Styles before being eliminated by Sami Zayn.

Owens then entered a feud with Dolph Ziggler, with the two trading victories over each other on back to back episodes of Raw. On the February 15 episode of Raw, Owens won his second Intercontinental Championship, defeating former champion Ambrose, Stardust, Tyler Breeze and Ziggler in a fatal five-way match. At Fastlane on February 21, Owens successfully defended the title against Ziggler. At WrestleMania 32 on April 3, Owens lost the title to Zack Ryder in a seven-way ladder match. He resumed the feud with longtime rival Sami Zayn after attacking him on Raw, defeating Zayn at Payback on May 1. At Extreme Rules on May 22, Owens faced Zayn, Cesaro and The Miz in a fatal four-way match for the Intercontinental Championship, but lost when The Miz pinned Cesaro. At Money in the Bank on June 19, Owens competed in the Money in the Bank ladder match, which was won by Ambrose.

==== Universal Champion (2016–2017) ====
"I think Stephanie [McMahon] wants Raw to be the best show possible and if you want that, you've got to pick me, because I'm the best thing going, [...] But being picked where I was kind of a slap in the face, to be honest, but I'll use that as motivation to show everybody why I should be the face of Raw."

— Owens commenting on his 18th draft pick position, in an interview with The Independent in August 2016

During the 2016 WWE draft, Owens was drafted to the Raw brand. At Battleground on July 24, Owens lost to Zayn. At SummerSlam on August 21, Owens and Chris Jericho defeated Enzo Amore and Big Cass. The next night on Raw, Owens defeated Neville to qualify for the vacant Universal Championship fatal four-way elimination match the following week.

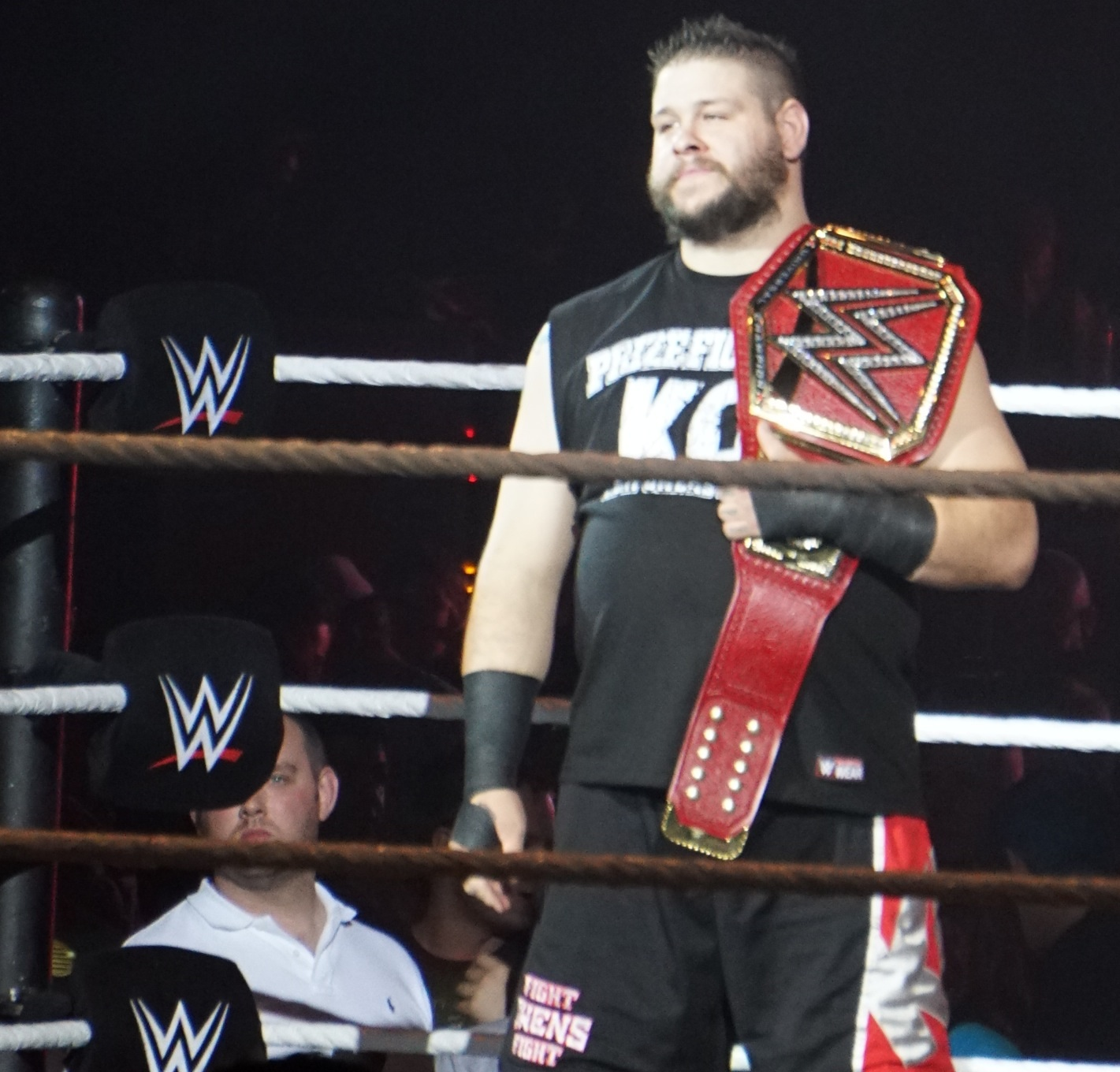
Owens as Universal Champion in September 2016

On the August 29 episode of Raw, Owens defeated Cass, Roman Reigns and Seth Rollins after interference from Triple H to win the Universal Championship, his first world title in WWE. Owens successfully defended the title against Rollins at Clash of Champions on September 25 and Hell in a Cell in a Hell in a Cell match on October 30, both times after interferences from Jericho. Owens and Jericho were later announced as co-captains of Team Raw alongside Braun Strowman, Reigns and Rollins for the traditional Survivor Series match at Survivor Series on November 20, where they lost to Team SmackDown. The following night on Raw, Owens retained the title against Rollins in a No Disqualification match after interference from Jericho.

On the November 28 episode of Raw, WWE United States Champion Reigns issued a challenge to Owens, who stated that he did not need Jericho's help against him, and Owens suffered his first pinfall loss since becoming champion after losing a non-title match to Reigns that same night, earning Reigns a Universal Championship match against Owens at Roadblock: End of the Line. At the event on December 18, Owens retained the title against Reigns by disqualification when Jericho intentionally attacked him with a Codebreaker. This led to Reigns's rematch at the Royal Rumble being under the stipulation that would see Jericho (who pinned Reigns in a handicap match involving Owens to win the United States Championship on the January 9 episode of Raw) being suspended above the ring in a shark proof cage. On January 29, 2017, at Royal Rumble, Owens defeated Reigns in a No Disqualification match after interference from Strowman. The following night on Raw, Owens defended the title against Strowman. Despite the match ending in a no contest after Reigns attacked both him and Strowman, Owens retained the title.

On the February 6 episode of Raw, Owens was challenged by Goldberg to a championship match at Fastlane, which Jericho accepted on Owens's behalf, much to his dismay. On the February 13 episode of Raw, Jericho hosted a "Festival of Friendship" for Owens, who was not impressed with Jericho's idea of humor and instead then presented Jericho with a new list as a gift, but when Jericho realized that he was the first name on it and that it was "The List of KO", Owens turned on Jericho and viciously attacked him. At Fastlane on March 5, Owens lost the title to Goldberg in 22 seconds after a distraction from Jericho, ending his reign at 188 days.

==== United States Champion (2017–2018) ====
The following night on Raw, Owens accepted Jericho's challenge for a match at WrestleMania 33 on April 2 as long as Jericho would defend the United States Championship, which Owens won for the first time in his career. On the April 11 episode of SmackDown Live, Owens was traded to the SmackDown brand as part of the 2017 WWE Superstar Shake-up. Owens, who was scheduled to defend the title against Jericho at Payback with the winner going to SmackDown as well, started referring to himself as the "Face of America" and began sporting a different look, having trimmed his beard and hair down, while wearing a suit. At Payback on April 30, Owens lost the title back to Jericho, ending his reign at 28 days. Owens reclaimed the title on the May 2 episode of SmackDown Live by defeating Jericho, attacking and injuring him after the match.

At Backlash on May 21, Owens defeated AJ Styles by countout to retain the United States Championship, but lost the title to Styles during a house show at Madison Square Garden on July 7, ending his second reign at 66 days. He regained the title at Battleground on July 23 but lost it back to Styles two days later on SmackDown in a triple threat match also involving the returning Jericho. Owens failed to regain the title on the August 1 episode of SmackDown Live and at SummerSlam on August 20 with Shane McMahon as the special guest referee. During that time, Owens dropped the Face of America gimmick and reverted to the Prizefighter persona, shedding both the suits and America-orientated promos. On the August 22 episode of SmackDown Live, in another title rematch with Baron Corbin as the special guest referee, Owens was again unsuccessful, after Corbin walked out on the match and Shane took over, distracting Owens enough for Styles to capitalize and win. This also meant that as long as Styles held the title, Owens could not challenge Styles for the title again, ending their feud.

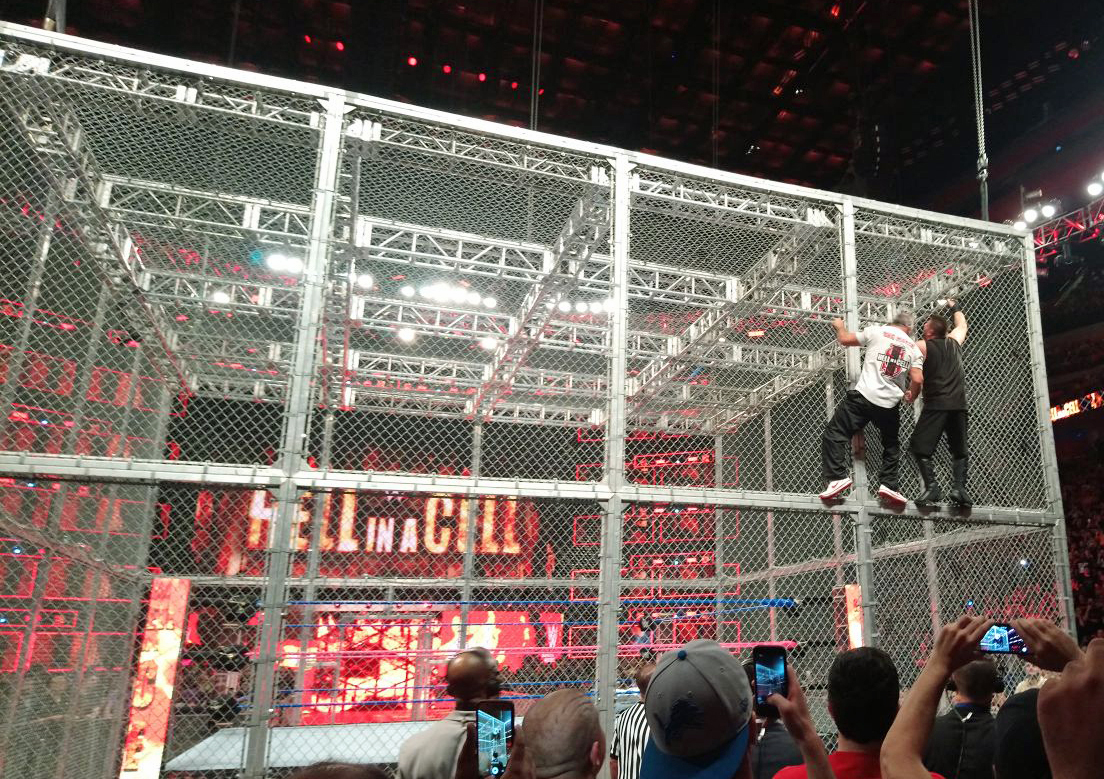
Owens wrestling Shane McMahon at Hell in a Cell in October 2017

On October 8, at Hell in a Cell, Owens defeated McMahon in a Hell in a Cell match after interference from Zayn. At Clash of Champions on December 17, Owens and Zayn defeated Randy Orton and Shinsuke Nakamura in a tag team match with their jobs on the line and with McMahon and SmackDown Live General Manager Daniel Bryan as special guest referees. Owens and Zayn failed to win Styles's WWE Championship in a handicap match at Royal Rumble on January 28, 2018 and at Fastlane on March 11 in a six-pack challenge. At WrestleMania 34 on April 8, they lost to McMahon and Bryan, who made his in-ring return, after Bryan submitted Zayn.

After WrestleMania, they were assigned to the Raw brand. On May 6, at Backlash, Owens and Zayn lost to Bobby Lashley and Braun Strowman. At Money in the Bank on June 17, Owens competed in the Money in the Bank ladder match, which was won by Strowman. Following weeks of Strowman humiliating Owens, he defeated Strowman in a steel cage match at Extreme Rules on July 15. At SummerSlam on August 19, Owens failed to win Strowman's Money in the Bank contract in under two minutes. On October 8, WWE announced Owens suffered injuries to both knees in a match with Lashley the previous night on Raw, which required surgery; an angle was done to write Owens off television during the previous night's episode of Raw where Lashley, per manager Lio Rush's instructions attacked Owens knees with a steel chair.

==== Brand switches (2019–2022) ====
After weeks of vignettes promoting Owens’s return, he returned as a face on the February 26 episode of SmackDown, replacing Kofi Kingston in the WWE Championship match at Fastlane on March 10 against Daniel Bryan, per Vince McMahon's orders. A returning Mustafa Ali was added to the match, making it a triple threat match, and Owens failed to win the title after Bryan pinned Ali. In April, Owens started a storyline where he congratulated Kingston for winning the WWE Championship and joined The New Day as their honorary third member, since Big E was recovering from an injury. However, since Bryan suffered an injury at WrestleMania, SmackDown needed a top level heel, so on the April 23 episode of SmackDown, Owens turned on Kingston and attacked him and Xavier Woods, turning him back into a heel. On May 19, Owens failed to win the WWE Championship from Kingston at Money in the Bank. At Stomping Grounds on June 23, Owens and Zayn defeated Big E and Woods.

On the July 2 episode of SmackDown, Owens questioned Shane McMahon's decisions and underhanded tactics before they were interrupted by Dolph Ziggler, leading to McMahon booking them in a tag team match which they lost after a miscommunication. The following week, Owens stated his distaste in McMahon's constant dominance on television, before fleeing as McMahon called for security. Later that night, Owens interfered in Ziggler's match against Roman Reigns and hit McMahon with a stunner, turning face once again. At Extreme Rules on July 14, Owens defeated Ziggler in 17 seconds. At SummerSlam on August 11, Owens defeated McMahon in a match where had Owens lost, he would be fired. Owens lost to Elias in the first round of the King of the Ring tournament with McMahon as the special guest referee. On the September 10 episode of SmackDown, McMahon fired Owens, after McMahon tapped out to Chad Gable in their King of the Ring semi-final match, where Owens was serving as the special guest referee. The following week, Owens attended the show as an audience member, but had also filed a kayfabe wrongful termination lawsuit against McMahon. On October 4, during the 20th Anniversary of SmackDown, Owens defeated McMahon in a ladder match with both men's careers on the line. As per the pre-match stipulation, McMahon was fired from WWE.

On October 11, Owens moved back to the Raw brand as part of the draft. On November 23, at NXT TakeOver: WarGames, Owens made a one-off appearance as Tommaso Ciampa's mystery fourth partner for the WarGames match against The Undisputed Era (Adam Cole, Bobby Fish, Kyle O'Reilly, and Roderick Strong), which Team Ciampa won. At Survivor Series the next night, Owens made up part of Team Raw in a losing effort to Team SmackDown also involving Team NXT. Owens subsequently began a feud with Seth Rollins and was targeted in attacks by Rollins and his allies AOP (Akam and Rezar). At the Royal Rumble on January 26, 2020, Owens entered the titular match at number 27, but was eliminated by Rollins. On Night 1 of WrestleMania 36 on April 4, Owens defeated Rollins in a No Disqualification match ending their feud. At The Horror Show at Extreme Rules on July 19, Owens defeated Murphy, an ally of Rollins, on the pre-show. After this, Owens entered into a program with Aleister Black, trading victories until the October 12 episode of Raw, when Owens defeated Black to end their feud.

As part of the 2020 Draft in October, Owens was drafted to the SmackDown brand. He reignited his rivalry against Roman Reigns and challenged him for the Universal Championship on three occasions—at TLC on December 20, in a steel cage match on the December 25 episode of SmackDown, and at Royal Rumble on January 31, 2021, but lost all matches after interference from Jey Uso and Paul Heyman. At Elimination Chamber on February 21, Owens competed in the Elimination Chamber match where the winner would receive an immediate Universal Championship match, eliminating Sami Zayn before being eliminated by Uso. Owens defeated Zayn at Night 2 of WrestleMania 37 on April 11, lost to Zayn at Hell in a Cell on June 20, and defeated Zayn again in a Last Man Standing match on the July 2 episode of SmackDown to qualify for the Money in the Bank ladder match at Money in the Bank on July 18, which was won by Big E.

As part of the 2021 Draft, Owens was drafted to the Raw brand, where he turned heel for the first time since 2019 by attacking WWE Champion Big E. He competed for the title in a fatal five-way match on January 1, 2022, at Day 1, which was won by Brock Lesnar. On Night 1 of WrestleMania 38 on April 2, Owens faced Stone Cold Steve Austin in a No Holds Barred match in the main event, which marked Austin's first match in 19 years after his retirement. Owens lost to Austin and was escorted out of the stadium by Dallas police officers. Following WrestleMania, Owens began a storyline with a clean shaven Elias, who claimed to be Elias's younger brother Ezekiel, much to Owens's irritation as he thought he was actually Elias himself. At Hell in a Cell on June 5, Owens defeated Ezekiel. On the August 8 episode of Raw, he stretchered Ezekiel out of the arena after attacking him with an apron powerbomb, a move he had not used in years, ending their feud. Owens subsequently brought back his original "Prizefighter" gimmick (along with the entrance video used during his time in NXT and the duct tape motive KO logo) on the August 22 episode of Raw and turned face in the process, which was solidified after a victory over Chad Gable.

==== Reunion with Sami Zayn (2022–2024) ====
At Survivor Series: WarGames on November 26, Owens, The Brawling Brutes (Sheamus, Ridge Holland, and Butch) and Drew McIntyre lost to The Bloodline (Roman Reigns, Jey Uso, Jimmy Uso, Solo Sikoa, and Sami Zayn) in a WarGames match. On January 28, 2023, at Royal Rumble, Owens lost to Reigns in an Undisputed WWE Universal Championship match. After the match, Owens was beaten down by The Bloodline, except for Zayn, who would hit Reigns with a chair, leading to the entire Bloodline attacking Zayn. After the Elimination Chamber main event on February 18, Owens saved Zayn from a beatdown by Reigns and Jimmy Uso. On Night 1 of WrestleMania 39 on April 1, Owens and Zayn defeated the Usos to win the Undisputed WWE Tag Team Championship in the main event, making Owens the 23rd WWE Grand Slam champion.

As part of the 2023 WWE Draft, Owens, along with Zayn, was drafted to the Raw brand. At Night of Champions on May 27, Owens and Zayn retained the Undisputed Tag Team Championship against Reigns and Sikoa. At Payback on September 2, Owens and Zayn lost the titles to The Judgment Day (Damian Priest and Finn Bálor) in a Pittsburgh Steel City Street Fight, ending their reign at 154 days. They were unsuccessful in a rematch for the titles on the September 25 episode of Raw. In October, Owens was traded to the SmackDown brand, splitting up the team of Owens and Zayn.

==== Championship pursuits and injury (2024–2026) ====
Owens faced Logan Paul for the United States Championship at Royal Rumble on January 27, 2024 and in a triple threat match also involving Randy Orton at Night 2 of WrestleMania XL on April 7, losing both times. On the April 19 episode of SmackDown, Owens reignited his feud with The Bloodline after he was attacked by its newest member, Tama Tonga. At Backlash France on May 4, Owens and Orton lost to Sikoa and Tonga in a Tag Team Street Fight after interference from Tama's brother Tanga Loa. At Money in the Bank on July 6, Owens, Orton and Undisputed WWE Champion Cody Rhodes lost to Sikoa, Tonga and the debuting Jacob Fatu in a six-man tag team match after interference from Loa.

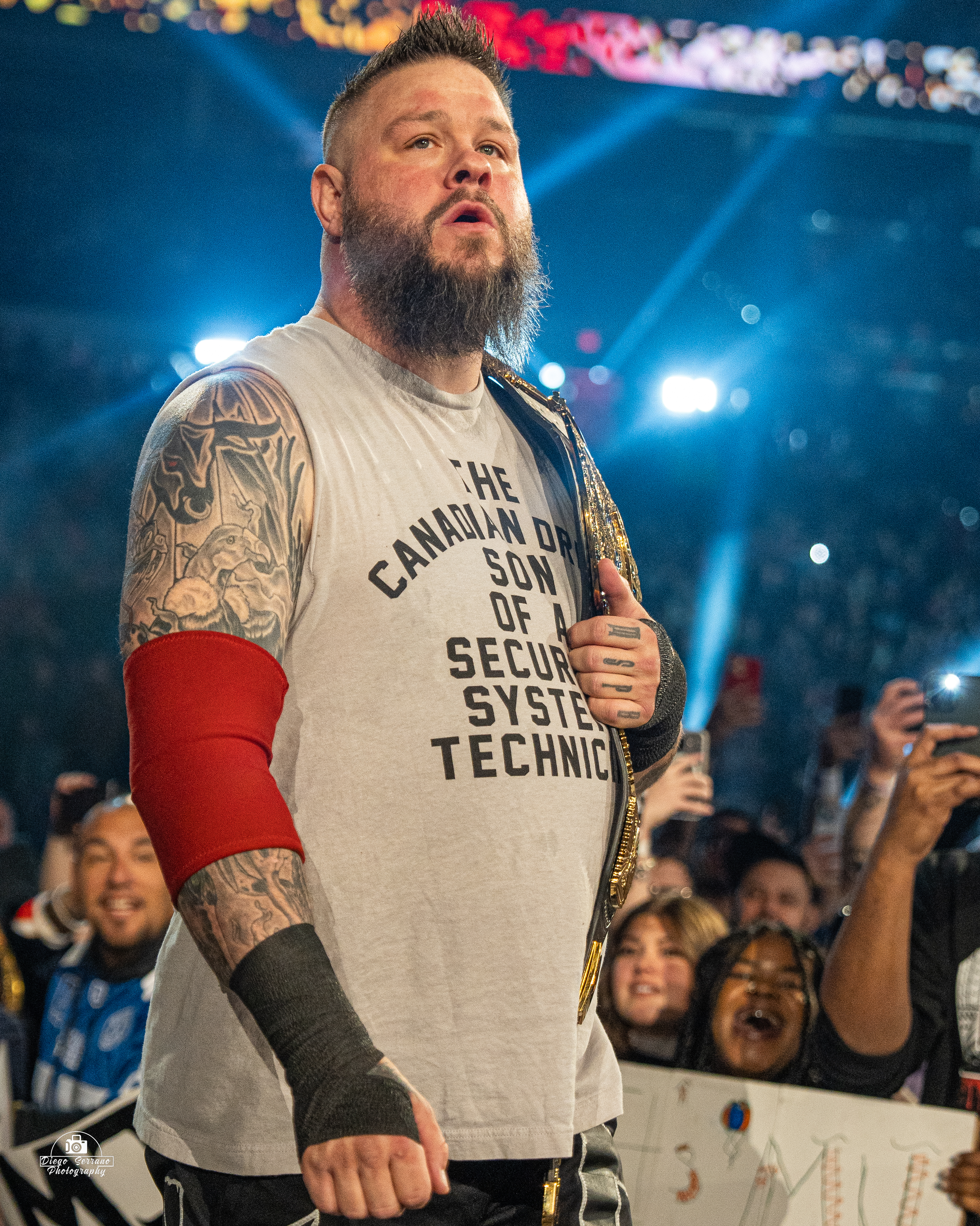
Owens with the Winged Eagle championship belt at Royal Rumble on February 1, 2025.

At Bash in Berlin on August 31, Owens faced Rhodes for the Undisputed WWE Championship in a losing effort. On October 5, after Bad Blood went off the air, fans captured video footage of Owens attacking Rhodes as he was entering his bus, turning Owens heel for the first time since 2022. He solidified his heel turn on the following episode of SmackDown by attacking Randy Orton in the parking lot. A match was made official between Owens and Orton for Crown Jewel on November 2, where both men brawled throughout the arena and the match never started. The following week on SmackDown, Owens took out Orton with a piledriver. At Saturday Night's Main Event on December 14, Owens again faced Rhodes for the title but lost in a controversial manner. After the event went off the air, Owens brutally attacked Rhodes with a package piledriver and got into a verbal and physical confrontation with Chief Content Officer Paul "Triple H" Levesque. Owens then stole the Winged Eagle-design WWE Championship (that was presented to Rhodes by Levesque specially for Saturday Night's Main Event) and began referring to himself as the “True WWE Champion". At Royal Rumble on February 1, 2025, Owens failed to win the Undisputed WWE Championship from Rhodes in a ladder match with both the "Undisputed" and "Winged Eagle" title belts on the line, ending their feud.

On the February 3 episode of Raw, Owens attacked Sami Zayn following his qualifying match for the Elimination Chamber match against CM Punk by ambushing him from behind and delivering a package piledriver on to Zayn, reigniting a feud between the two once again. At Elimination Chamber: Toronto on March 1, Owens defeated Zayn in an unsanctioned match, and was afterwards confronted by a returning Randy Orton, leading to a brawl between the two. A match between Owens and Orton was then scheduled for Night 2 of WrestleMania 41. However, on the April 4 episode of SmackDown, Owens announced that he had suffered a neck injury and would require surgery, putting him out of action indefinitely. He would be replaced by Joe Hendry, who answered Orton's open challenge on the night of WrestleMania 41.

==== Return from injury (2026–present) ====
At SummerSlam, Owens made his surprise return as a face to participate in the number one contenders match for the Undisputed WWE Championship, in which he won, by defeating Finn Bálor, Gunther, and Sami Zayn. On the August 21 episode of SmackDown, Owens lost to CM Punk in an Undisputed WWE Championship match after interference from Zayn. On the October 2 episode of SmackDown, Owens defeated Cody Rhodes and Johnny Gargano to qualify for the Men's Money in the Bank ladder match. At the event on October 10, Owens failed to win the match as it was won by Penta.

== Other media ==
In 2012, Ring of Honor (ROH) released a two-disc set entitled Kevin Steen: Ascension to the Top, focusing on his first two years with the promotion, and Kevin Steen: Descent into Madness, covering his solo run from 2009 to 2010. In 2013, ROH released a DVD titled Kevin Steen: Hell Rising, which included both his best matches in the promotion and a shoot interview, in which Steen went into detail most notably about his relationship with Jim Cornette and his booking of ROH. The DVD was pulled from ROH's online store shortly after its release. It was made available again during the 2013 Christmas season. Following his departure, ROH released another three disc set entitled Thanks Steen Thanks, which featured matches from the end of his championship run through his final match with the company.

Owens is a playable character in the video games WWE 2K16, WWE 2K17, WWE 2K18, WWE 2K19, WWE 2K20, WWE 2K Battlegrounds, WWE 2K22, WWE 2K23, WWE 2K24, WWE 2K25 and WWE 2K26.

== Personal life ==
Steen married Karina Lamer in 2007. They have a son named Owen (named after Owen Hart, with Steen dedicating his WWE ring name to both his son and Hart) and a daughter named Élodie Leila. At the end of the DDT4 Night One event in May 2008, a then-six-month-old Owen appeared in a segment with Excalibur in which Excalibur called him "ugly", prompting Steen to perform three consecutive package piledrivers on him before placing Owen on top of Excalibur for the pinfall.

Steen is best friends with fellow Canadian wrestler Rami Sebei, currently known in WWE as Sami Zayn, with the pair's on-screen characters teaming up or feuding with each other various times since they first met in 2002.

Steen is a fan of Canadian country singer Shania Twain. The two met at her Montreal show in 2018, where he joined her on stage and she promised that she would sing her song "When" for him if he defeated his then-rival, Braun Strowman.

== Championships and accomplishments ==
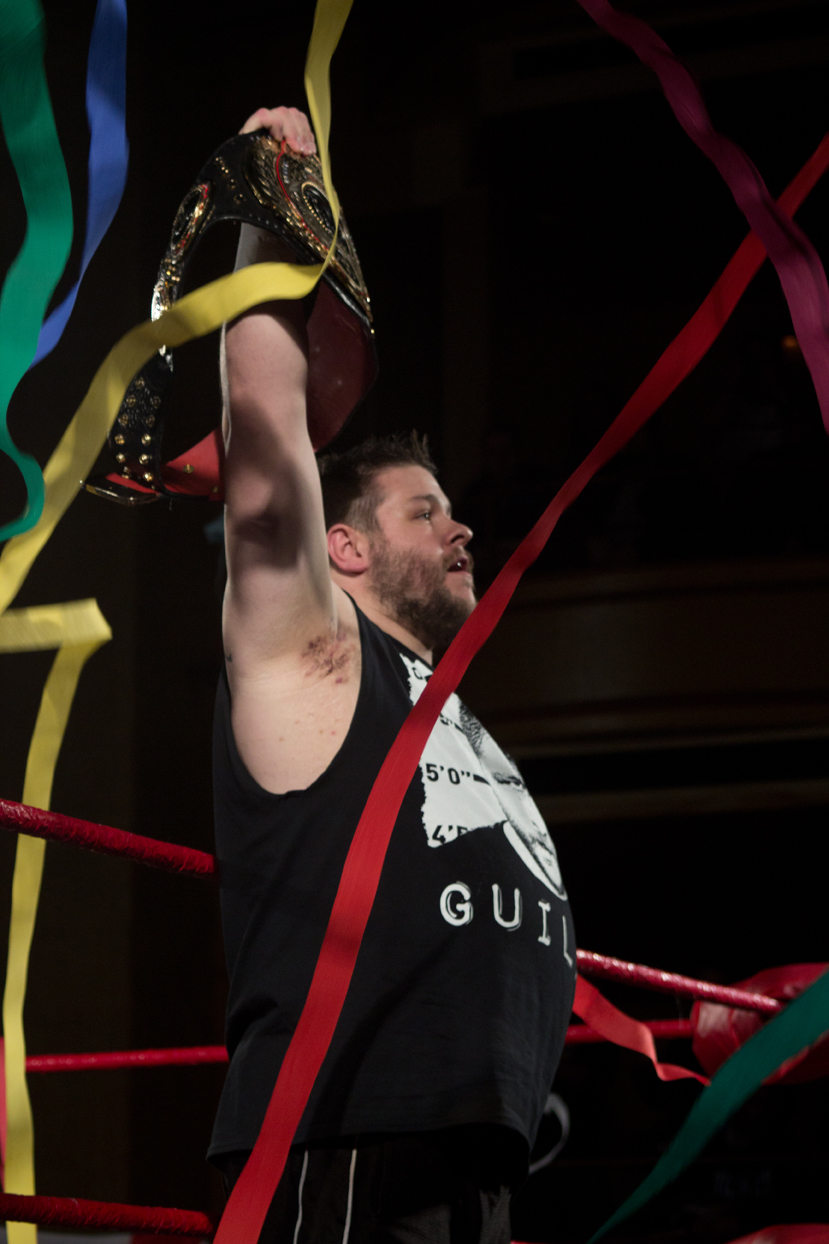
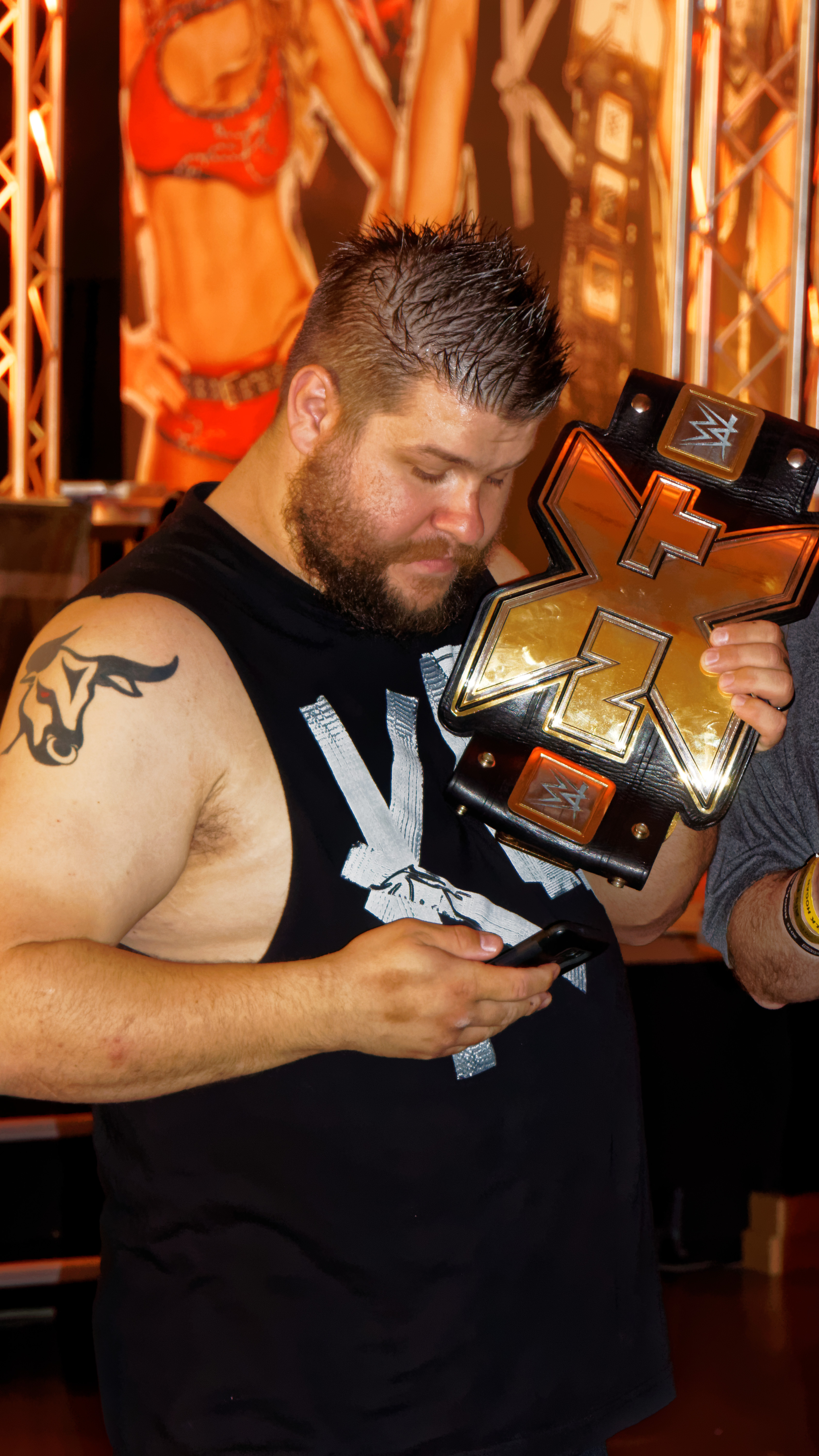
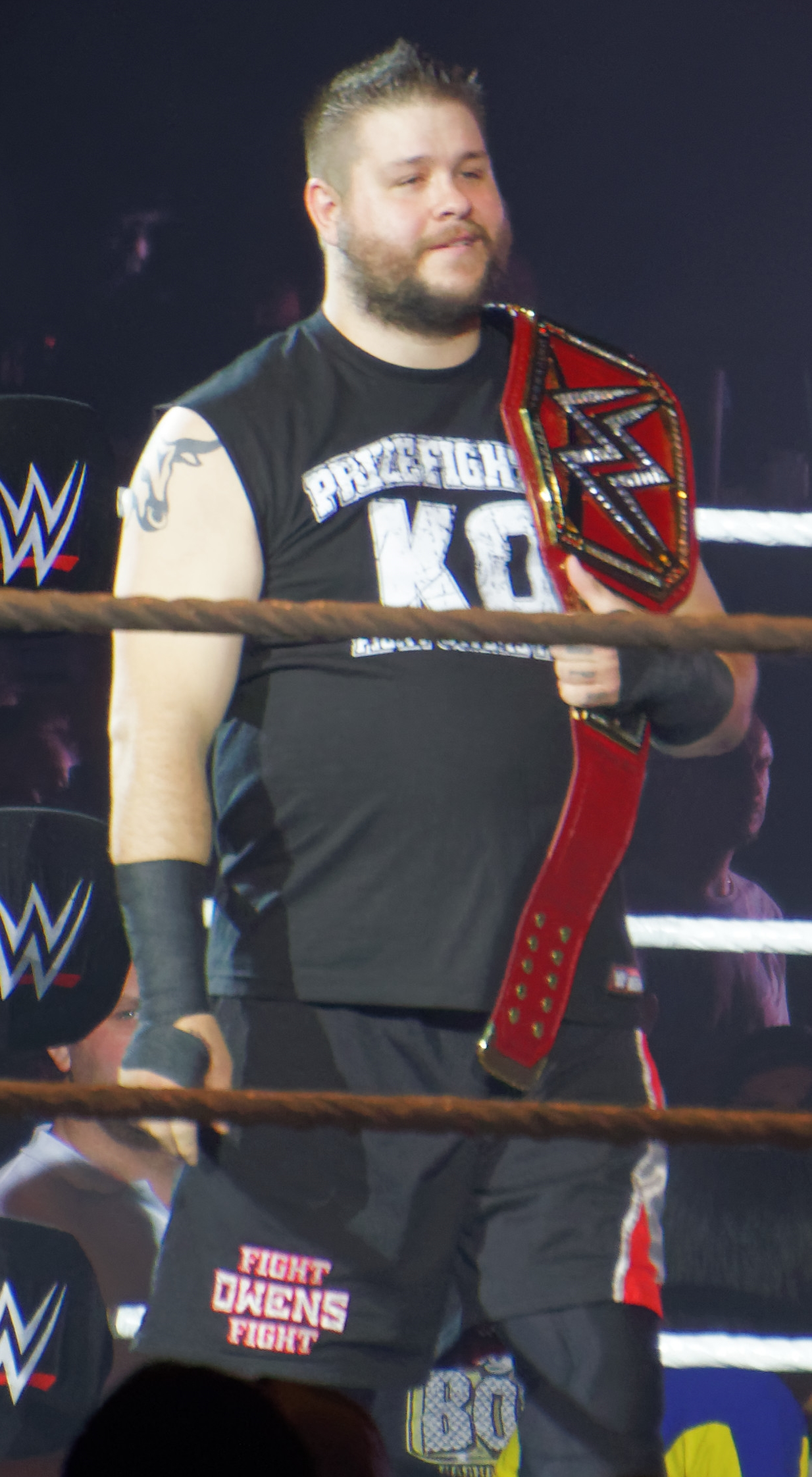
Owens is a former ROH World Champion, a former NXT Champion, and a former Universal Champion.
- All American Wrestling
  - AAW Heavyweight Championship (1 time)
- Capital City Championship Combat
  - C4 Championship (1 time)
  - C4 Tag Team Championship (1 time) – with Mike Bailey
  - C4 Championship Tournament (2009)
- Combat Zone Wrestling
  - CZW Iron Man Championship (1 time)
- Elite Wrestling Revolution
  - EWR Heavyweight Championship (2 times, inaugural)
  - Elite 8 (2005)
  - EWR Championship Tournament (2004)
- International Wrestling Syndicate
  - IWS Canadian Championship (1 time)
  - IWS World Heavyweight Championship (3 times)
- North Shore Pro Wrestling
  - NSPW Championship (1 time)
- Pro Wrestling Guerrilla
  - PWG World Championship (3 times)
  - PWG World Tag Team Championship (3 times) – with El Generico (2) and Super Dragon (1)
- Pro Wrestling Illustrated
  - Ranked No. 3 of the top 500 singles wrestlers in the PWI 500 in 2017
- Quebec Wrestling Hall of Fame
  - Class of 2017
- Ring of Honor
  - ROH World Championship (1 time)
  - ROH World Tag Team Championship (1 time) – with El Generico
  - ROH World Championship No. 1 Contender Tournament (2008)
  - Match of the Decade (2010s) vs. El Generico at Final Battle 2012: Doomsday
- Rolling Stone
  - Best Heel (2015)
  - Best Promos (2015) tied with John Cena
  - Best Storyline (2015) vs. John Cena
  - Ranked No. 6 of the 10 best WWE wrestlers of 2016
  - Rookie of the Year (2015)
  - WWE Match of the Year (2015) vs. John Cena at Money in the Bank
  - WWE Wrestler of the Half-Year (2015)
- SoCal Uncensored
  - Match of the Year (2011) with Super Dragon vs. The Young Bucks on December 10
  - Wrestler of the Year (2005, 2011, 2012)
- Sports Illustrated
  - Ranked No. 7 of the top 10 wrestlers in 2017
- Wrestling Observer Newsletter
  - Best Brawler (2010–2012)
  - Feud of the Year (2010) vs. El Generico
  - Feud of the Year (2023) with Sami Zayn vs. The Bloodline
- Squared Circle Wrestling
  - 2CW Heavyweight Championship (1 time)
  - 2CW Tag Team Championship (1 time) – with Jason Axe
  - 2CW Heavyweight Championship Tournament (2012)
- WWE
  - WWE Universal Championship (1 time)
  - NXT Championship (1 time)
  - WWE Intercontinental Championship (2 times)
  - WWE United States Championship (3 times)
  - WWE Raw Tag Team Championship (1 time) – with Sami Zayn
  - WWE SmackDown Tag Team Championship (1 time) – with Sami Zayn
  - 16th Grand Slam Champion (under current format; 23rd overall)
  - WWE United States Championship #1 Contender Tournament (2023)

== Lucha de Apuesta record ==
Winner (wager)	Loser (wager)	Location	Event	Date	Notes
El Generico (mask)	Kevin Steen (contract)	New York City, New York	Final Battle 2010	December 18, 2010	This was an unsanctioned Fight Without Honor
