= Death Before Dishonor XI =

2013 Ring of Honor pay-per-view event

- Promotion: Ring of Honor
- Date: September 20, 2013
- City: Philadelphia, Pennsylvania
- Venue: Pennsylvania National Guard Armory
- Attendance: 1,200

Pay-per-view chronology
← Previous; Best in the World	Next → Global Wars

ROH Death Before Dishonor chronology
← Previous; X	Next → XII

Death Before Dishonor XI was the 11th Death Before Dishonor professional wrestling pay-per-view event produced by Ring of Honor (ROH). It took place on September 20, 2013, at the Pennsylvania National Guard Armory in Philadelphia, Pennsylvania.

== Background ==
=== Storylines ===
Other on-screen personnel
Role:	Name:
Commentators	Kevin Kelly
Commentators	Nigel McGuinness
Commentators	Maria Kanellis

Death Before Dishonor XI will feature professional wrestling matches, which involved different wrestlers from pre-existing scripted feuds, plots, and storylines that played out on ROH's television programs. Wrestlers portrayed villains or heroes as they followed a series of events that built tension and culminated in a wrestling match or series of matches.

The ROH World Championship tournament was announced after ROH Match Maker Nigel McGuinness had to strip champion Jay Briscoe of the title due to injury. The tournament started with three first round matches (Cole vs. Mark Briscoe; A. C. H. vs. Anderson; Lethal vs. Dutt) on July 27, 2013, at ROH TV taping in Providence, RI. There was also a qualifying match at the TV taping won by Silas Young. The rest of the first round matches were on August 3 at ROH All Star Extravaganza V in Toronto, Canada, plus the first quarter-final between Cole and Lethal. The final three quarter-finals took place on August 17 at Manhattan Mayhem V in Manhattan, New York. The semi-finals and final happened at Death Before Dishonor XI.

=== ROH World Championship tournament ===
First Round
Mark Briscoe	Pin
Adam Cole
Jay Lethal	Pin
Sonjay Dutt
Tommaso Ciampa	Pin
Silas Young
Michael Bennett	Draw*
B. J. Whitmer
Karl Anderson	Pin
A. C. H.
Paul London	Pin
Michael Elgin
Matt Taven	Pin
Roderick Strong
Brian Kendrick	Sub
Kevin Steen

Quarterfinals
Adam Cole	Pin
Jay Lethal
Tommaso Ciampa	Pin
Michael Bennett
Karl Anderson	Pin
Michael Elgin
Roderick Strong	Pin
Kevin Steen

Semifinals
Adam Cole	Pin
Tommaso Ciampa
Michael Elgin	Sub
Kevin Steen

Finals
Adam Cole	Pin
Michael Elgin

- *The match ended in a draw after Whitmer was legitimately injured after a piledriver on the apron of the ring and was unable to continue. As a result, Bennett advanced in the tournament.

== Results ==
No.	Results	Stipulations	Times
1	Jay Lethal defeated Silas Young	Singles match	9:30
2	Adam Cole defeated Tommaso Ciampa	Semi-Final match in the vacant ROH World Championship tournament	13:54
3	Michael Elgin defeated Kevin Steen by submission	Semi-Final match in the ROH World Championship tournament	19:24
4	The Forever Hooligans (Rocky Romero and Alex Koslov) (c) defeated The American Wolves (Davey Richards and Eddie Edwards)	Tag Team match for the IWGP Junior Heavyweight Tag Team Championship	19:44
5	Adam Page defeated R.D. Evans (with Veda Scott)	Singles match	2:02
6	Roderick Strong defeated Ricky Marvin	Singles match	12:46
7	Adrenaline Rush (A. C. H. and TaDarius Thomas) and C&C Wrestle Factory (Caprice Coleman and Cedric Alexander) defeated reDRagon (Bobby Fish and Kyle O'Reilly), Matt Taven, and Michael Bennett (with Kasey Ray, Scarlett Bordeaux, Seleziya Sparx, Truth Martini and Maria Kanellis)	Eight-Man Tag Team match	12:11
8	Adam Cole defeated Michael Elgin	Final match in the vacant ROH World Championship Tournament	26:33
(c) / – the champion(s) heading into the match
