= Hammerstein Ballroom =

Ballroom in Manhattan, New York

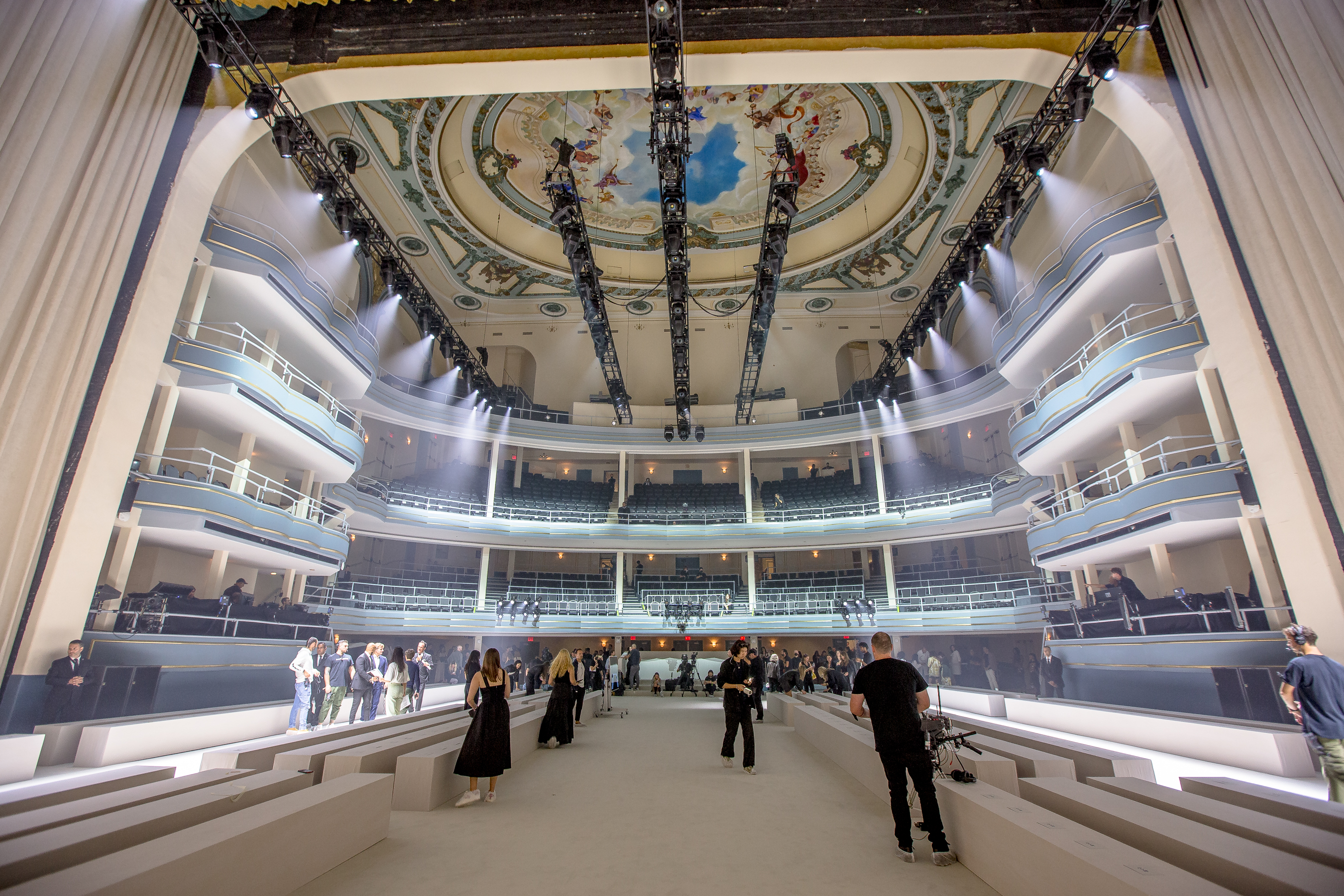
- Interactive map of Hammerstein Ballroom
- Address: 311 West 34th Street
- Location: New York City, New York, U.S.
- Coordinates: 40°45′10″N 73°59′39″W
- Owner: Unification Church
- Capacity: 2,500 (Reception style); 2,000 (Theater style); 1,000 (Seated Dinner)
- Type: Music
- Public transit: New York City Subway: at 34th Street-Penn Station at 34th Street-Penn Station; Amtrak, LIRR, NJ Transit at Penn Station; New York City Bus: M7, M20, M34 SBS, M34A SBS

Construction
- Opened: 1906
- Renovated: 1997

Website
- Venue Website

The Hammerstein Ballroom is a 35,000-square-foot (3,300 m^{2}) ballroom located within the Manhattan Center at 311 West 34th Street in Midtown Manhattan, New York City. The capacity of the ballroom is dependent on the configuration of the room; it seats 2,000 people for theatrical productions and musical performances, and several thousand for events held within a central ring. The floor of the ballroom is flat. The two main balconies – which are unusually close to the ground and gently sloped – seat a total of 1,200. The third balcony has been stripped of seats and is not used.

== History ==
The Manhattan Center was constructed in 1906 by Oscar Hammerstein I as the Manhattan Opera House, the home for his Manhattan Opera Company, an alternative to the popular yet comparatively expensive Metropolitan Opera. In 1910, the Metropolitan Opera paid Hammerstein $1.2 million to stop operating the Manhattan Opera House as an opera venue for ten years. This led to the elaborately decorated theater being used for a variety of events, including vaudeville.

The ownership of the center changed hands multiple times over the next few decades, with the theater being converted into a large ballroom and being used as a temple for the Scottish Rite branch of Freemasonry in the 1930s and a trade union headquarters in the 1940s before falling into disuse in the 1970s. It was bought by Sun Myung Moon's Unification Church, the ballroom's current owner. The building was renamed Manhattan Center Studios in 1986, and in 1997 the former theater was renamed the Hammerstein Ballroom and underwent extensive renovation, with the hand-painted ceiling being completely restored.

== Notable events ==
The Hammerstein Ballroom has seen performances from a wide variety of musical acts and its popularity has varied over the years due mainly to competition within the neighborhood.

- In April 1971 the Grateful Dead recorded several tracks for the live album, Skull & Roses, which became the band's first RIAA gold album.
- Jane's Addiction recorded the 1997 Halloween Show of their reunion tour at the Hammerstein Ballroom, with the band's members performing some numbers in their encore from the balcony.
- In 1997, Bryan Adams recorded his album Unplugged at the Hammerstein Ballroom. He was backed by students of the Juilliard School of Music in the orchestra.
- In 1998, Amy Grant performed her tour in support of the gold record Behind The Eyes at the Hammerstein Ballroom.
- Patti LaBelle recorded her DVD Live! One Night Only at 2 sold-out concert at the Hammerstein Ballroom with special guests Luther Vandross and Mariah Carey. It was released in 1998 and later won her a Grammy Award.
- On July 7, 1999, Britney Spears performed to a sold-out crowd as part of her ...Baby One More Time Tour. It marked the singer's first solo concert in New York City.
- The professional wrestling promotion Extreme Championship Wrestling staged some of its events from the Ballroom. Starting in August 2000, ECW staged two back to back shows before holding its final two pay-per-view events, Massacre on 34th Street in December 2000 and Guilty as Charged in 2001.
- Boy band O-Town performed at the ballroom on the last night of their concert tour in 2001. The concert was filmed and was released as O-Town: Live from New York.
- Alt-rock band Incubus played at the Hammerstein on September 15, 2001, at a time when nearly all other bands scheduled to perform in New York City canceled their appearances in the wake of the September 11th terrorist attacks.
- In 2002, NASCAR held its annual end-of-season awards ceremony in the Ballroom, the only time from 1981 to 2008 the end-of-season awards ceremony was not held in the Waldorf-Astoria, with the Grand Ballroom being the location from 1985-2001 and 2003-2008.

On November 2nd 2003 the theatre hosted the 75th anniversary of CBS with a television special CBS at 75

- The metal band Korn recorded their DVD Live at the Hammerstein Ballroom.
- The popular rock/jam band O.A.R. released a live album in 2004, 34th & 8th, which was recorded at the Hammerstein Ballroom.
- Iron Maiden was scheduled to perform four concerts at the Ballroom on 23, 24, 26 and 27 January 2004, for their Dance of Death World Tour. The second show was cut short after one audience member dropped a beer on the soundboard, while the final concert was cancelled due to a scheduling conflict.
- In May 2006, hard rock band Guns N' Roses played 4 sold-out shows at the venue as a "warm up" for the 2006/07 leg of their Chinese Democracy Tour.
- The Ballroom hosted two WWE-promoted ECW One Night Stand pay-per-views in 2005 and 2006.
- In November 2006, David Bowie gave his final public performance at the venue.
- Metal band Avenged Sevenfold recorded live performances for their DVD All Excess.
- The professional wrestling promotion Ring Of Honor has hosted DVD and TV tapings as well as pay-per-view events at the Hammerstein Ballroom since A New Level in 2008, having also used the adjacent Grand Ballroom regularly for events. These include Manhattan Mayhem events 6th, 7th, 8th and 10th Anniversary Show: Young Wolves Rising, Supercard of Honor V and Supercard of Honor VII, Best in the World 2011 Best in the World 2012: Hostage Crisis, Glory By Honor V : Night 2, Glory By Honor VI : Night Two, Glory by Honor VIII: The Final Countdown, Glory By Honor IX, Death Before Dishonor VI, Death Before Dishonor IX, and most Final Battle events. They also co-hosted events in the venue with New Japan Pro-Wrestling, with ROH/NJPW War of the Worlds (2014). and Night 3 of ROH/NJPW War of the Worlds (2017).
- Several shows have been taped here, including some seasons of NBC's America's Got Talent and part of the third season of the Bergeron version of Hollywood Squares.
- On September 23, 2010, Total Nonstop Action Wrestling (TNA) held a non televised house show in the Ballroom for the first time.
- Thirty Seconds to Mars played their 300th sold out World Record show on December 7, 2011.
- All Time Low recorded their first live DVD titled Straight to DVD at the Hammerstein Ballroom.
- Sony hosted a reveal event of the PlayStation 4 console at the Ballroom.
- Howard Stern held his 60th Birthday Bash at the Ballroom on January 31, 2014.
- On October 17–18, 2014, May 28, 2016, and July 14, 2018, virtual singer and Vocaloid character Hatsune Miku performed at the Hammerstein Ballroom as part of Crypton Future Media's Miku Expo concerts.
- On December 21, 2018, AJR performed at the venue for their The Click Tour.
- On September 28, 2019, New Japan Pro-Wrestling hosted the last professional wrestling event in the Venue Fighting Spirit Unleashed New York. They also co-hosted events in the venue with Ring of Honor, with ROH/NJPW War of the Worlds (2014) and Night 3 of ROH/NJPW War of the Worlds (2017).
- On February 8, 2020, the New York Excelsior of the Overwatch League held the esports league's first homestand, a hybrid home-and-away format similar to other professional sports leagues, at a sold-out Ballroom.
- On January 23, 2022, Game Changer Wrestling presented The Wrld On GCW. This event set a Hammerstein Ballroom record for attendance.
- On July 7, 2023, Irish rock band The Saw Doctors returned for their first show in the United States in 10 years. This would be only 1 of 2 shows they are scheduled to perform in the US during their 2023 revival tour.
- On November 12, 2024, All Elite Wrestling and Ring of Honor announced that they would hold the 2024 Final Battle pay-per-view on December 20, 2024, and All Elite Wrestling's three programs, a live episode of Collision at the venue on December 21, 2024, a combined Dynamite on 34th Street and Rampage taping on December 22, 2024.
- On May 19, 2026, Sukeban held a show at the venue.

== See also ==
- Audubon Ballroom
- Roseland Ballroom
