= Death Before Dishonor X: State of Emergency =

Professional wrestling event

- Promotional poster featuring Kevin Steen and Rhino
- Promotion: Ring of Honor
- Date: September 15, 2012
- City: Chicago Ridge, Illinois
- Venue: Frontier Fieldhouse
- Attendance: 900

Pay-per-view chronology
← Previous; Boiling Point	Next → Glory By Honor XI: The Unbreakable Hope

Death Before Dishonor chronology
← Previous; IX	Next → XI

Death Before Dishonor X: State of Emergency (DBD X) was the tenth Death Before Dishonor professional wrestling internet pay-per-view (iPPV) event produced by Ring of Honor (ROH). It took place on September 15, 2012, at the Frontier Fieldhouse in Chicago Ridge, Illinois.

== Production ==
Other on-screen personnel
Role	Name
Commentators	Kevin Kelly
Commentators	Nigel McGuinness

=== Storylines ===
DBD X featured professional wrestling matches which involve different wrestlers from pre-existing scripted feuds, plots, and storylines that played out on ROH's television programs. Wrestlers portrayed villains or heroes as they followed a series of events that built tension and culminated in a wrestling match or series of matches.

== Results ==
No.	Results	Stipulations	Times
1	S.C.U.M. (Jimmy Jacobs and Steve Corino) defeated Caprice Coleman and Cedric Alexander	Tag team match	—
2	TaDarius Thomas defeated Silas Young	Survival of the Fittest 2012 qualifying match	—
3	Kyle O'Reilly defeated A. C. H. by submission	Singles match	—
4	Rhett Titus and Charlie Haas (with Shelton Benjamin) defeated The Briscoe Brothers (Jay Briscoe and Mark Briscoe)	Tag team match	—
5	Jay Lethal defeated Homicide	Singles match	14:33
6	The House of Truth (Roderick Strong and Michael Elgin) (with Truth Martini) defeated The Irish Airborne (Jake Crist and Dave Crist)	Tag team match	8:44
7	Adam Cole (c) defeated Mike Mondo	Singles match for the ROH World Television Championship	19:30
8	S.C.U.M. (Jimmy Jacobs and Steve Corino) defeated Rhett Titus and Charlie Haas (with Shelton Benjamin)	Tag team match for the vacant ROH World Tag Team Championship	—
9	Kevin Steen (c) defeated Rhino (with Truth Martini)	No Disqualification match for the ROH World Championship	16:18
(c) / – the champion(s) heading into the match

== See also ==
- ROH Death Before Dishonor
