= Death Before Dishonor VIII =

Canadian wrestling event

- Promotional material for the event featuring Eddie Edwards
- Promotion: Ring of Honor
- Date: June 19, 2010
- City: Toronto, Ontario
- Venue: Ted Reeve Arena
- Attendance: 1,300

Pay-per-view chronology
← Previous; ROH The Big Bang!	Next → Glory By Honor IX

Death Before Dishonor chronology
← Previous; VII	Next → IX

Death Before Dishonor VIII (DBD VIII) was a professional wrestling pay-per-view (PPV) event produced by Ring of Honor (ROH), which was only available online. This marked the 8th event entitled Death Before Dishonor, with this being the event's first time on pay per view. It took place on June 19, 2010, in Toronto, Ontario, Canada.

== Production ==
=== Background ===
On November 23, 2009, ROH announced that they had signed a pay-per-view deal with Go Fight Live (GFL) to air live events over the Internet. The first event to be aired as part of this deal was Final Battle 2009 followed by The Big Bang four months later.

=== Storylines ===
Other on-screen personnel
Commentator	Dave Prazak

Death Before Dishonor VIII featured professional wrestling matches that involved different wrestlers from existing, scripted feuds and storylines with wrestlers portrayed as villains or heroes, or more ambiguous characters in scripted contests that build tension and culminate in a wrestling match on the pay per view.

On May 5, 2010, Ring of Honor's official website announced that ROH would have their next online pay per view event in Toronto, being the first time the Death Before Dishonor lineage would be featured in such a capacity. This is the third pay per view ROH had featured online.

Two main events were announced for the show. The first of which was for the ROH World Tag Team Championship. At the previous show, The Big Bang, Claudio Castagnoli and Chris Hero (collectively known as The Kings of Wrestling) defeated Jay and Mark Briscoe for the titles. As per wrestling norms, in which former champions are generally granted a rematch, this became the case for the Death Before Dishonor VIII PPV.

The second main event match promoted for the show was for the ROH World Championship. After examining ROH's system of determining a contender for title, the Pick 6 Series, it was announced on the company's website that executive producer Jim Cornette had named a new number-one contender to face Black at the Death Before Dishonor VIII PPV: Davey Richards, ranked number-four in the Pick 6 Series.

In addition to the aforementioned 'twin main events', it was announced that former tag team partners Kevin Steen and El Generico would have their first one-on-one encounter at Death Before Dishonor VIII. Steen and Generico had been at odds since 2009 after being unable to regain the World Tag Team Championship. This tension came to a boiling point at Final Battle 2009 when the team lost to The Young Bucks, after which a frustrated Steen turned on Generico by smashing a steel chair over his head. The following months saw Steen distance himself from his partner, instead aligning with Steve Corino, who had recently returned to the company after an absence of several years. Together, the two began antagonizing Generico, who would continually refuse to retaliate against his former partner. In the interim, Colt Cabana reached out to Generico and together they challenged Steen and Corino on multiple occasions, leading to a tag match at The Big Bang PPV, which saw Generico stand up to his former partner for the first time.

== Results ==
No.	Results	Stipulations	Times
1^{D}	The Bravado Brothers (Harlem Bravado & Lance Bravado) defeated Mike Sydal & Sebastian Suave	Tag team match	—
2^{D}	Bobby Dempsey and Grizzly Redwood defeated Mr. Ernesto Osiris and Rip Impact	Tag team match	—
3	Kevin Steen defeated El Generico	Singles match	17:42
4	The All Night Express (Kenny King and Rhett Titus) defeated Cheech and Cloudy	Tag team match	08:42
5	Delirious defeated Austin Aries by disqualification	Singles match	13:04
6	Roderick Strong (with Truth Martini) defeated Colt Cabana, Eddie Edwards, Shawn Daivari, Steve Corino and Tyson Dux	Toronto Gauntlet for an ROH World Championship match at Glory By Honor	28:24
7	Christopher Daniels (2) defeated Kenny Omega	Singles match for Pick 6 Series	16:12
8	The Kings of Wrestling (Chris Hero and Claudio Castagnoli) (c) (with Shane Hagadorn) defeated The Briscoe Brothers (Jay Briscoe and Mark Briscoe)	No Disqualification match for the ROH World Tag Team Championship	18:11
9	Tyler Black (c) defeated Davey Richards	Singles match for the ROH World Championship	34:44
(c) / – the champion(s) heading into the match; D / – this was a dark match

== See also ==
- Professional wrestling in Canada
