= Death Before Dishonor IX =

2011 professional wrestling event

- Promotion: Ring of Honor
- Date: September 17, 2011
- City: New York, New York
- Venue: Manhattan Center
- Attendance: 1,200

Pay-per-view chronology
← Previous; Best in the World	Next → Final Battle

Death Before Dishonor chronology
← Previous; VIII	Next → X

Death Before Dishonor IX (DBD IX) was the 9th ROH Death Before Dishonor professional wrestling pay-per-view (PPV) event produced by Ring of Honor (ROH). It took place on September 17, 2011, at the Grand Ballroom of the Manhattan Center in the New York City borough of Manhattan, and it was also the first ROH event to use the new logo that was used under Sinclair Broadcast Group's management of the company until Supercard of Honor (2022).

== Production ==
Other on-screen personnel
Role	Name
Commentators	Dave Prazak
Commentators	Kevin Kelly

=== Storylines ===
Death Before Dishonor IX featured eight different professional wrestling matches involving different wrestlers from pre-existing scripted feuds, plots, and storylines that played out on Ring of Honor's (ROH) television programs. Wrestlers portrayed villains or heroes as they followed a series of events that built tension and culminated in a wrestling match or series of matches.

== Results ==
No.	Results	Stipulations	Times
1^{P}	Andy Ridge defeated Grizzly Redwood	Survival of the Fittest 2011 qualifying match	07:11
2	The Embassy (Rhino and Tommaso Ciampa) (with Prince Nana, Ernesto Osiris, Princess Mia and R.D. Evans) defeated Homicide and Jay Lethal	Tag team match	10:15
3	Shelton Benjamin defeated Mike Bennett (with Bob Evans)	Singles match	10:54
4	The Young Bucks (Matt Jackson and Nick Jackson) defeated Future Shock (Adam Cole and Kyle O'Reilly) and Bravado Brothers (Harlem and Lancelot Bravado)	Three-way elimination tag team match	10:51
5	El Generico vs. Jimmy Jacobs ended in a no contest	Singles match	12:00
6	Charlie Haas defeated Michael Elgin (with Truth Martini)	Singles match	12:42
7	Eddie Edwards defeated Roderick Strong (with Truth Martini)	The "Ringmaster Challenge" – two out of three falls match	42:45
8	The All Night Express (Rhett Titus and Kenny King) defeated The Briscoe Brothers (Jay Briscoe and Mark Briscoe)	Ladder War III to determine #1 contenders for the ROH World Tag Team Championship at Glory By Honor X	27:54
P / – the match was broadcast on the pre-show

== See also ==
- 2011 in professional wrestling
- List of Ring of Honor pay-per-view events
