= Bret Hart: Survival of the Hitman =

- Poster for the film.
- Written by: John Pollock
- Starring: Bret Hart; Bruce Hart; Keith Hart; Ross Hart; Jimmy Hart; Dwayne Johnson; Lance Storm
- Original language: English

Production
- Producers: John Pollock; Jorge Barbosa; Wai Ting; Loudon Owen

Original release
- Network: The Fight Network
- Release: March 22, 2010

Bret Hart: Survival of the Hitman also known as just Survival of the Hitman is a 2010 television documentary film chronicling Canadian professional wrestler Bret Hart's life as he prepared for his in-ring return at WrestleMania XXVI after a ten-year absence from the ring after a career ending concussion. It also covers the rise of Hart's career and his split with World Wrestling Federation (WWF, now WWE) in 1997. It is a Fight Network original documentary and first aired March 22, 2010. The documentary was produced by John Pollock, Jorge Barbosa and Wai Ting. The documentary features interviews with Bret, members of Hart's family, former head of WWE Canada Carl De Marco, former sports agent Gord Kirke and producer of Wrestling with Shadows, Paul Jay. It also features archive footage of wrestlers, Dynamite Kid, Bad News Allen, Curt Hennig and Ric Flair.

It is the third documentary about Bret Hart, the first being Hitman Hart: Wrestling with Shadows in 1998 which chronicles Hart's last days wrestling in the WWF and the second Bret "Hit Man" Hart: The Best There Is, the Best There Was, the Best There Ever Will Be in 2005 which is a DVD released by WWE Home Video.

== Production ==
The project originally began as a feature idea concerning Bret Hart's return to the WWE but it continued to grow when Hart got involved, thus changing the concept into a two-hour documentary. The documentary producers have stated that while interviewing Hart it was necessary to avoid showing copyrighted material from WWE which prompted them to make the decision to film Hart's reactions while watching tapes of his old work while he commentated over them. They have also stated that while filming they ended up with several hours of footage which had to be excluded from the film to avoid going over the time limit.

The advertisement picture of Hart which was used for the poster was taken and licensed by photographer John W. MacDonald.

The first trailer for the film was released on March 18, 2010.

== Overview ==
The film begins with a backstory on Hart about his youth, early career in amateur wrestling and goes on to show some of his earliest matches with the Dynamite Kid in his father, Stu Hart's wrestling promotion Stampede Wrestling in the late 70's and early 80's. Later it includes discussion of Hart's first world title win against Ric Flair. In his interview segment Hart states that the fact that WWE owner Vince McMahon gave him the opportunity to be the world champion is one of the reasons why he felt compelled to return to the company and forgive Vince McMahon despite their personal and professional differences.

On the documentary Hart offers his insight on Survivor Series 1997, which was the event where the Montreal Screwjob took place where Vince McMahon changed the ending of an important match where Hart and McMahon had agreed to before without Hart's consent, while watching the video footage. Later, the documentary shows Hart walking the audience through his range of emotions on the moment on January 4 when he returned to WWE TV. The documentary also focuses on the death of his youngest brother Owen Hart whom he had worked closely with in WWE before his death in an accident on a WWE PPV when Hart was with another company in 1999, as well as the deaths of Hart's brother-in-law "British Bulldog" Davey Boy Smith, his parents Helen and Stu, as well as Hart's concussion and subsequent stroke.

The documentary focuses on Hart's passion for the wrestling business, which is part of the reason for why he chose to return to the WWE and to the wrestling ring despite being fragile physically and being well off financially. Included in the documentary are three of Hart's seven brothers, Bruce, Keith and Ross.

== Release ==
The film first aired on the Canadian Fight Network in 2010 and was shown again in 2011. It was also available for free on the Fight Networks official YouTube channel for some time, although that is not the case anymore. As of December 2017 the film is available on the streaming service Global Wrestling Network.

=== Reception ===
The film was well received, and one review stated that the film is a great companion piece to Hart's Autobiography.

James Caldwell, writer and assistant editor at the Pro Wrestling Torch stated "Like a good wrestling promoter or a good screenplay writer, the producers of the documentary showed fundamental understanding of their audience. The documentary was aimed at Canadian TV viewers who appreciate good, honest values, fairness, justice, and fair play. Interviews with the likes of Lance Storm, Mauro Ranallo, former WWE VP Carl De Marco, and "Pain & Passion" author Heath McCoy captured those images and themes." He also went on to say that the documentary is in his opinion excellent at telling its story and that he felt Hart was very candid in his interviews.

=== Reuse ===
Some parts from the documentary as well as non-included material such as leftover interview segments from Hart has been used by John Pollock in his wrestling podcast Review-A-Wai which is also featured on the Fight Network.

== See also ==
- Bret "Hit Man" Hart: The Best There Is, the Best There Was, the Best There Ever Will Be
- Hitman Hart: Wrestling with Shadows
