= Live Audio Wrestling =

Canadian sports radio talk show

- Other names: Fight Network Radio
- Genre: Sports talk
- Running time: 60 minutes (until Fall 2000); 120 minutes (Fall 2000–October 2017); 180 minutes (special post-WrestleMania editions)
- Country of origin: Canada
- Language: English
- Home station: 1. Virtually Canadian (May 23, 1997 - Fall 1998); 2. CJCL (Fall 1998 - Fall 2000); 3. CFMJ (Fall 2000 - January 2005); 4. CFRB (January 2005 - January 2009); 5. Hardcore Sports Radio/The Score Satellite Radio on Sirius Satellite Radio (January 2009 - August 2011); 6. Fight Network online (September 2011 – October 2011); 7. CHUM (October 2011 – October 2017)
- Syndicates: See #Fight Network Radio (July 2006 – January 2009)
- Starring: "Notorious T.I.D." Chris Tidwell(1997–1999) "Big Daddy" Donnie DaSilva (1997–2000) "Gentleman" Jeff Marek (1997–2003); Trish Stratus (1999); Dan "The Mouth" Lovranski (2000–2017); Jason Agnew(2003–2017)
- Created by: Jeff Marek
- Produced by: George Stroumboulopoulos (1997-1998); Dan Lovranski (1998–2000); Jason Agnew (1999–2003); John Pollock (2005–2017)
- Edited by: John Pollock (2003–2005)
- Recording studio: Toronto, Ontario
- Original release: May 10, 1997 – October 29, 2017
- No. of series: ~20 years
- No. of episodes: ~1040 LAW episodes numerous Spinoff Series episodes
- Audio format: Monaural sound (May 1997 – January 2009, October 2011 – October 2017); Stereophonic sound (January 2009 – October 2011)
- Ending theme: "I Fought the Law" by Green Day
- Website: www.liveaudiowrestling.com
- Podcast: http://fightnetwork.com/static/xml/itunes_law.rss

Live Audio Wrestling (also known as The LAW) was a Canadian sports radio talk show hosted by "The Mouth" Dan Lovranski and Jason Agnew. The program primarily focused on news and events related to professional wrestling (such as WWE) and mixed martial arts.

First premiering in May 1997 as an internet radio show, LAW later shifted to conventional radio on several stations in the Toronto area, and moved to CHUM-AM in 2011. Due to the show's popularity, TSN's Off the Record has featured past and current co-hosts of the radio program as guest panelists over the years.

Live Audio Wrestling announced its cancellation on October 30, 2017, due to cutbacks following Anthem Sports & Entertainment's acquisition of TNA Wrestling, which impacted The LAW's syndicator, Fight Network Radio. Most of its segments and spin-off shows have since migrated to a new website, known as "Post Wrestling".

== History ==
Original logo used until July 31, 2005

Live Audio Wrestling premiered on May 23, 1997 as an internet radio show through Virtually Canadian, with Faarooq as its first guest. The show aired online for a year and a half before moving to CJCL, The Fan 590—however, it was still only broadcast online, since the show was broadcast as replacement programming due to NBA policies prohibiting the station's online feed from airing Toronto Raptors games. In an effort to secure studio time, the show was taped early in the morning. Due to popular demand and listener support, The LAW soon became part of The Fan's normal lineup, airing in the early afternoon on Saturdays.

The show later expanded to include a two-hour late-night program on Sunday nights from 1:00 to 3:00 a.m., later moved to Saturdays at 11:00 p.m. in late 1999, while the afternoon edition moved to 5:00 p.m. In February 1999, Dave Meltzer of the Wrestling Observer Newsletter began a weekly segment during the program.

The LAW aired on The Fan 590 until September 2000 when it moved to rival station CFYI Talk 640 as a companion to the station's recently acquired radio broadcasts of Toronto Maple Leafs games. The evening broadcast was moved from Saturdays to Sundays. In April 2001, the afternoon edition of The LAW was dropped during the station's re-launch under the Mojo Radio format, while The LAW remained on the station through 2006

In January 2005, Fight Network purchased a majority stake in The LAW, and in February of that same year announced that they had secured an agreement with Broadcast News for national syndicated the program through Fight Network Radio. Affiliates of the group (aside from its flagship Toronto stations) included: CKST Vancouver, CFRN Edmonton, CFGO Ottawa, CHMJ Vancouver, and CJOB Winnipeg.

In July 2006, The LAW moved to CFRB and retained its 11pm time-slot. In the Fall 2006, LAW announced that the show would eventually begin to air in simulcast on Fight Network, though nothing came of it.

The show is ranked No. 1 in the demographic of male, on talk radio in the Toronto market, in its time slot. In April 2006, The Bureau of Broadcast Measurement released their spring ratings with The LAW ranking No. 1 among Males 25 - 49 on Sunday nights with an 18.7 share and also scoring a 17.8 share among Males 18 – 34.

Starting in the winter of 2007, John Pollock began to host an extended, online edition of The LAW called Live Audio Xtra. The segment is available to those who listen to the archived edition of the show on The LAW website, as an add-on to the original radio production. Shortly after its launch, Dan Lovranski began to co-host the segment, answering e-mail questions. Starting with the January 20th 2008 edition, Live Audio Xtra began to take call-in questions from listeners who were unable to get on the air during the radio portion of the program. This segment of the show was discontinued for a brief period of time, but returned to The LAW in 2011.

=== Satellite radio, interim podcast, and CHUM ===
The LAW aired its final edition on CFRB on January 11, 2009, moving to the Sirius Satellite Radio channel Hardcore Sports Radio (later known as The Score Satellite Radio), maintaining its Sunday night timeslot, and still being produced from CFRB's studios. After the closure of The Score Satellite Radio in August 2011, The LAW briefly became a podcast on the Fight Network website; using the same format as the radio versions but without call-in segments.

On October 9, 2011, The LAW moved to CHUM AM; while the program maintained its traditional 11:00 p.m. timeslot, it is preempted by Sunday Night Football during the NFL season.

The LAW began airing on CHUM's sister station CFTE in Vancouver on September 9, 2012. The LAW currently does not air on any other TSN Radio station.

=== Cancellation ===
On the morning of October 30, 2017, the LAW issued a statement:

Effective immediately, Live Audio Wrestling (The LAW) is being placed on a short hiatus. The program will be relaunched with a new format in the coming weeks. Stay tuned!

— Live Audio Wrestling, http://fightnetwork.com/law/law-update/ https://twitter.com/LAWradio/status/925117227854127104

The announcement came fourteen hours after the October 29 edition of The LAW was made available for podcasting. The host's initial plan for the next week involved a returning John Pollock reviewing Impact's Bound For Glory 2017, and UFC 217.

It was reported on the Wrestling Observer / Figure Four Online website in Dave Meltzer's October 30 Daily Update that;

Very sorry to report that Live Audio Wrestling has been canceled and John Pollock and Jason Agnew were let go by The Fight Network. It's sad that the Impact acquisition has devastated Anthem's television network, first losing Robin Black and now Pollock, who is the total real deal as a reporter. I've been doing that show every weekend for 19 years and have enjoyed it greatly. John, Jason and Dan Lovranski have been great to work with and I wish the best to all of them

— Wrestling Observer

On the October 31 edition of Wrestling Observer Radio, Meltzer stated "The amount of money that they're (Anthem) losing on Impact, has led to them doing cuts on the Fight Network" and "All the particulars (Presenters) that were on the show you know, are going to be gone." He went on to speculate that The LAW may be turned into an "Impact promotional show".

Many of the LAW hosts including those from the associated podcasts received overwhelming support from their fans on Twitter, including Jason Agnew, John Pollock, Wai Ting, Braden Herrington, "Bartender" Dave, Brian Mann, and Nate Milton, while Chris Charlton, WH Park, Martian Bushby, and Richard Benson publicly thanked The LAW & John Pollock for their opportunities with "Japanese Audio Wrestling" and "British Audio Wrestling" respectively. Oli Court of "British Audio Wrestling" hinted "it's not the end of anything just yet!" and Jojo Remy of "Japanese Audio Wrestling" stated "Not sure what this means for my show. I’ll continue to be a strong presence at Voices of Wrestling."

Starting with the day after the shutdown of the LAW, John Pollock and Wai Ting continued to post audio reviews of Raw and SmackDown, under the temporary titles of John Pollock and Wai Ting Review Raw and John Pollock and Wai Ting Review SmackDown, respectively. On their first episode as independent podcasters, both hosts (Pollock had been one of Fight Network's longest-tenured employees, and, at the time of their release, one of the few remaining full-time journalists) discussed the news of being released from Fight Network (also stating that Dan "The Mouth" Lovranski and Jason Agnew were released), thanking their fans for all the support they received, their plans for their "future endeavours", alongside the review of Raw.

=== Post cancellation ===
POST Wrestling (Pollock Offsets Ting)

In January 2018, Impact Wrestling announced that a new show with the Live Audio Wrestling name will air as part of its Twitch channel, as a video podcast hosted by Jeremy Borash. The new show was officially announced on April 3, 2018 as Sunday Night's Main Event, and was set to air the following Sunday; immediately following Wrestlemania 34. However, owing to Borash's departure in April 2018, the show never aired.

The spiritual successor of Live Audio Wrestling in its original form, titled "POST Wrestling" (the name is an abbreviation of "Pollock Offsets Ting"), was announced on December 15, 2017, and launched on December 24, 2017. It owned in its entirety by John Pollock and Wai Ting, and launched with their annual Christmas show that they had been doing from their days on the LAW.Two temporary podcasts done by the duo were folded under the Post Wrestling banner, becoming Rewind-a-Raw and Rewind-a-SmackDown, while other LAW podcasts would eventually be relaunched.

== Show ==
=== Segments ===
- Dave Meltzer's Wrestling Observer Extra: Each week industry insider Dave Meltzer joins the LAW to discuss the latest in pro wrestling and Mixed Martial Arts.
- Title Bout Trivia: Wrestling themed quiz where the winner receives a T-shirt from "Barber Shop Window" or "Pro Wrestling Tees".
- LAW Interviews: In depth and full-length interviews with wrestling's top stars from the past and present.
- Breaking The LAW: The Host read some fan feedback on the week in wrestling from "lawradio.proboards.com".
- LAW Xtra: Occasionally added on the end of the podcast, it covers smaller pay-per-view reviews (e.g. ROH, NJPW) or may include additional interviews.
- whtsNXTra: Added on the end of the podcast, covers NXT Takeover reviews.

=== Hosts ===
Former co-hosts of the show include:

- Dan "The Mouth" Dan Lovranski (Producer: 1998–2000 / Host: 2000–2017)
- Jason Agnew (Producer: 1999–2003 / Host: 2003–2017)
- John Pollock (Editor: 2003–2005 / Producer: 2005–2017)
- Trish Stratus (Host: 1999)
- "Notorious T.I.D." Chris Tidwell (Host: 1997–1999)
- "Big Daddy" Donnie Abreu (Host: 1997–2000)
- "Gentleman" Jeff Marek (Host: 1997–2003)

Former co-hosts of the spinoff series shows include:

- Jason Agnew ("whts NXT": 2013–2017).
- John Pollock ("Review-A-Wai": 2009–2017; "Review-A-Raw": 2010–2017; "Review-A-SmackDown": 2011–2017; "The MMA Report": 2012–2017; "Bauer & Pollock": ?-2017)
- Wai Ting ("Review-A-Wai": 2009–2017; "Review-A-Raw": 2010–2017; "Review-A-SmackDown": 2011–2017)
- Braden Herrington ("whts NXT": 2013–2017).
- "Bartender" Dave ("whts NXT": 2016–2017).
- Brian Mann ("Review-An-Impact"/"Keep It 2000": 2015–2017).
- Nate Milton ("Review-An-Impact"/"Keep It 2000": 2015–2017).
- Jojo Remy ("Japanese Audio Wrestling": 2017–2017).
- WH Park ("Japanese Audio Wrestling": 2012–2017).
- Chris Charlton ("Japanese Audio Wrestling": 2012–2017).
- Martian Bushby ("British Audio Wrestling": 2017–2017).
- Oli Court ("British Audio Wrestling": 2017–2017).
- Richard Benson ("British Audio Wrestling": 2017–2017).

^ List of presenters only until time of hiatus, for full list of former presenters and spinoff series shows see below.

== Spinoffs ==
Over the years, there have been several radio shows and podcasts that have complemented the LAW. Since the shutdown of the LAW, these shows were also put on hiatus, with many of them migrating to Post Wrestling upon the latter's launch in December 2017.

=== Review-A-Raw ===
As a spinoff of Review-A-Wai, John Pollock and Wai Ting also review each week's edition of WWE Raw in a separate podcast series. As with Review-A-Wai, each episode John Pollock and Wai Ting run down the previous episode of WWE Raw and end by reading listener feedback. The first episode of Review-A-Raw was posted on July 6, 2010. For a time in 2011, Review-A-Raw was available as a live podcast, airing over the internet via Stickam immediately following WWE Raw, but it reverted to a taped format over technical issues resulting in one or both hosts being knocked off of the air.

As announced during a live Review-A-Wai podcast held immediately prior to WrestleMania 31, the Review-A-Raw name expanded to also encompass a television series broadcast on Fight Network, with John Pollock and Wai Ting as co-hosts. The televised version of Review-A-Raw is effectively a televised recording session of the podcast, with the actual WWE Raw review content identical in both versions. However, some segments have been modified to suit the television audience, such as the omission of listener feedback and a shorter banter portion at the start of the show that more directly relates to the co-hosts' positions at Fight Network. As both the podcast and televised shows are produced in the same sitting, there may be segments omitted from the televised portion; a selection of segments from the podcast version may be, at their discretion, posted to the Fight Network's YouTube page as Review-A-Raw Extra; the first Review-A-Raw Extra segment was dedicated to a contest selecting the televised series' theme music. As the podcast version takes precedence, the television edition of the show is likely to be pre-empted in the event of other Fight Network commitments by either host; this first occurred on July 5, 2016, where Jason Agnew would host an audio-only edition in lieu of the televised show, due to John and Wai covering UFC 200 for Fight Network. The final "podcast-only" episode of Review-A-Raw was posted March 31, 2015, with the first episode of the televised series aired on Fight Network on April 7, 2015.

In January 2016, John Pollock and Wai Ting also produced an additional televised segment, Raw in 3 Minutes, co-branded with Fight Network's Fight News Now branding; both the full televised version and Raw in 3 Minutes is available from the Live Audio Wrestling YouTube channel. In mid-2017, Review-A-Raw was made into a web-only video series alongside Review-a-SmackDown, ending the run of Raw in 3 Minutes.

The last episode of Review-a-Raw was posted on October 23, 2017. Following the shutdown of the LAW a week later, John Pollock and Wai Ting continued to post audio reviews of Raw under the temporary title of John Pollock and Wai Ting Review Raw. The full-time replacement for Review-a-Raw under the Post Wrestling banner, Rewind-a-Raw, launched on December 25, 2017.

=== Review-A-SmackDown ===
On selected weeks with a live episode of WWE SmackDown, a third LAW podcast starring John Pollock and Wai Ting is also available for download on Wednesdays. Like Review-A-Raw and Review-An-Impact, Review-A-SmackDown reviews the previous episode of WWE SmackDown, ending with listener feedback. The first episode of Review-A-SmackDown was posted on August 31, 2011, with Jason Agnew filling in for Wai Ting; the first episode with Wai Ting was posted on December 1, 2011. Up until the second WWE brand extension, Review-A-SmackDown would be produced only on a show-by-show basis, and not every live episode of WWE SmackDown would be reviewed.

Review-A-SmackDown would become a weekly podcast with the second WWE brand extension, complementing Review-A-Raw. Unlike Review-A-Raw, however, Review-A-SmackDown is intended to remain an audio-only podcast, and not a show that is meant to air on Fight Network. The first regular episode of Review-A-SmackDown was posted on July 19, 2016, covering the WWE draft that kicked off the second WWE brand extension.

For a brief time in 2017, Review-a-Smackdown was also made available as a web video, under the same format as Review-a-Raw. The last episode of Review-a-Smackdown was posted on October 25, 2017. Following the shutdown of the LAW later that week, John Pollock and Wai Ting continued to post audio reviews of SmackDown under the temporary title of John Pollock and Wai Ting Review SmackDown. The full-time replacement of Review-a-SmackDown, under the Post Wrestling banner, Rewind-a-SmackDown, launched on December 27, 2017.

=== whtsNXT ===
whtsNXT (pronounced as "what's next") is a podcast hosted by Jason Agnew and technical producer Braden Herrington, focusing on NXT, while incorporating elements from Bite Network Radio. The name was chosen to not only reflect the product being reviewed (a show based on developmental wrestling), but also the fact that this was Braden's first foray into radio broadcasting (having joined shortly after the LAW debuted on TSN Radio as one of his first industry jobs), and a turning point in Agnew's television career (having left Bite TV since the LAW debuted on TSN Radio, leaving him with no permanent work in television aside from Splatalot). It is seen as continuing in the "rite of passage" of LAW hosts moving up the ranks (Dan Lovranski, Jason Agnew, John Pollock, and Wai Ting were all, at one point, technical producers on The LAW), with the veteran Agnew guiding the rookie Braden, akin to NXT itself. The first episode was posted on October 7, 2013 as an addition to the LAW's podcast, but thereafter was separately posted on Thursdays thereafter.

"Bartender" Dave debuted on the January 21st 2016 edition of "whtsNXT" alongside Jason Agnew, he has since become a regular guest host on the show. Since Takeover's moved to Saturdays on the same weekend as the WWE's Big 4 events, Takeover reviews have been added onto the end of The LAW podcast under the title of "whtsNXTra". Also since 2017 whtsNXT has chosen to skip the review of the post-Takeover NXT episodes, stating there's no point in reviewing a review show.

The last episode of whtsNXT was posted on October 26, 2017. A spiritual successor under the Post Wrestling banner, titled upNXT and hosted by Braden Herrington and Davie Portman, was launched on March 22, 2018.

=== Review-A-Wai ===
"Review-A-Wai" is a weekly review podcast starring John Pollock and Wai Ting, which was originally presented immediately following the archived episode of the LAW and was later made available separately. The first episode was posted on September 13, 2009.

The two primarily review older wrestling pay-per-view events from the mid to late 1990s, but have since branched out to other media relating to wrestling and mixed martial arts. Notably, in a homage to an early "Ask-a-Wai" episode where John and Wai reviewed a wrestling-related pornographic film, the second and third anniversary shows had John and Wai review a wrestling-related pornographic film; the visible discomfort of Wai reviewing the film has led them to discontinue reviewing wrestling-related pornographic films. Reviews of classic events often contain audio clips from the show(s) they are reviewing; at the end of the show, John and Wai also respond to listener feedback after the review. On occasion, they air relevant clips from previous interviews conducted with various wrestling personalities and/or interview people involved with the event being reviewed, including clips from past "Live Audio Wrestling" shows. Each episode also ends with a piece of music specifically selected by one of the co-hosts, often relating to the show being reviewed.

On occasion, when either co-host is unavailable, a substitute co-host has joined the other co-host; most notably, Arda Ocal has been a guest reviewer on "Review-A-Wai" on several occasions during the years that the LAW and "Aftermath" (The Score Television Network's wrestling analysis show, co-hosted by Arda Ocal) were promoted together. Damian Abraham has also been a frequent guest reviewer, especially if the review contains a punk rock element.

The show ceased to be an add-on to the archived episode of the LAW in 2010 when the "Review-A-Wai" portion became as long as the archived episode of the LAW itself. "Review-A-Wai" was moved to a Wednesday release schedule following its second anniversary show, and later to late Tuesdays following the debut of "whtsNXT" so as to avoid multiple LAW podcasts being released on the same day. With the launch of "Review-A-SmackDown" as a regular weekly series, "Review-A-Wai" became a biweekly series posted on Fridays, alternating with "Bauer & Pollock". Following the end of "Bauer & Pollock", "Review-A-Wai" will continue to be a biweekly series on Fridays alternating with "Keep It 2000".

The final episode of Review-a-Wai was posted on October 19, 2017, with an announced episode that would have aired had the LAW not been shut down. The first episode of the spiritual successor of Review-a-Wai under the Post Wrestling banner, Rewind-a-Wai, launched with the review intended for the announced episode.

=== Japanese Audio Wrestling ===
Japanese Audio Wrestling is a monthly podcast hosted by Chris Charlton and WH Park, both having previously contributed to various LAW-related shows and podcasts, focusing in on Japanese wrestling. The first episode was posted on August 1, 2012. New host Jojo Remy joined the show on the January 6th, 2017, replacing the leaving pair of Chris Charlton & WH Park. From the 2017 April 3 edition WH Park has made a number of returning guest appearances.

Although put on hiatus with the shutdown of the LAW in October 2017, as part of the launch of Post Wrestling, it was announced that Japanese Audio Wrestling would continue under the Post Wrestling banner with a new name, with no specified timeframe for a relaunch.

- G1 Climax podcast

Related to Japanese Audio Wrestling is the LAW's daily coverage of the G1 Climax tournament each year, with John Pollock recapping most days of the tournament and Chris Charlton and WH Park recapping the remaining days of the tournament.

=== The MMA Report with John Pollock ===
The MMA Report with John Pollock is a radio show hosted by John Pollock on TSN Radio, first airing on July 5, 2012. It airs Friday at midnight on TSN Radio (though the show itself is available as a podcast on the LAW podcast feed one day before), and is touted as "the third hour" of the LAW as repeats of the show air immediately after the LAW on weeks without an Ultimate Fighting Championship pay-per-view (when The UFC Post Fight Show airs in its place instead). As with the LAW, it is also broadcast in the Vancouver market (formerly CFTE and presently CKST) since 2013.

The show is also considered to be a spiritual successor to Fight Network Radio, due to John Pollock's past and present connections.

=== Keep It 2000 ===
In December 2016, Brian Mann and Nate Milton returned with a new podcast, Keep It 2000 (billed as "A Podcast On A Pole"). They embarked on fully chronicling every WCW Nitro from the year 2000. These 52 episodes could prove to be the thing that finally breaks these podcasting brothers apart.

The final episode of Keep it 2000 as a LAW podcast was posted on October 14, 2017. As part of the Post Wrestling launch in December 2017, it was announced that Keep it 2000 would continue under the Post Wrestling umbrella; the first episode of Keep It 2000 under the Post Wrestling umbrella was posted on January 25, 2018.

=== British Audio Wrestling ===
British Audio Wrestling is a British Wrestling focused podcast launched by Martin Bushby and Oli Court, with the first episode posted on January 6, 2017. The pair were joined by Richard Benson of The Indy Corner from Episode 2 onwards. The show focuses in on UK promotions "Progress Wrestling", "Revolution Pro Wrestling", "Fight Club: PRO" & "Over The Top Wrestling" and also covers "ITV World of Sport Wrestling" & the "WWE United Kingdom Championship Tournament".

The final episode of British Audio Wrestling was posted on October 17, 2017. As part of the Post Wrestling launch in December 2017, it was announced that British Audio Wrestling would continue under the Post Wrestling umbrella under a new name, later revealed to be the British Wrestling Experience. The first episode of the British Wrestling Experience launched on January 18, 2018.

=== Bauer & Pollock ===
Bauer & Pollock is a co-production between Live Audio Wrestling and Major League Wrestling, where John Pollock and Court Bauer discuss the business of professional wrestling and mixed martial arts. Although initially designed to be a biweekly series, it was moved to a weekly format soon after, available on both the MLW and LAW podcast feeds. The show was originally posted on Fridays, but was moved to late Wednesdays to avoid having multiple LAW podcasts being posted on the same day. With the launch of Review-A-SmackDown as a weekly series, Bauer & Pollock became a biweekly series posted on Fridays, alternating with Review-A-Wai. After a lengthy hiatus on 12 January 12, 2017, "The Final Edition" of Bauer & Pollock was uploaded. The reason behind the decision to end Bauer & Pollock was the large workloads of each host and inability to find a common free day to do the podcast. On March 17, 2017, Court & John returned for a "One-Off" special, continuing to do almost one show every month since.

=== Ask-A-Wai / Bite Network Radio ===
Ask-A-Wai was an add-on to the end of each LAW broadcast starting in September 2008, and starred John Pollock and Wai Ting, then call screener on the LAW. It was taped immediately following Live Audio Xtra, and was a general discussion podcast and generally unrelated to wrestling. In late 2009, Jason Agnew joined Ask-A-Wai as a co-host, though retaining the same format as before.

Ask-A-Wai ended with the move of the LAW from CFRB to Hardcore Sports Radio, though the Ask-A-Wai format would be succeeded with the Bite Network Radio podcast. Bite Network Radio itself would be hosted by Jason Agnew and John Pollock, retaining the format of Ask-A-Wai, and occasionally featuring Wai Ting and other members from their circle of friends. Like Ask-A-Wai, Bite Network Radio was taped immediately following the LAW.

Bite Network Radio ended with the move of the LAW to TSN Radio, as the studios at TSN could no longer accommodate all of the regular hosts. Though The Late Shift, a radio show hosted by Jason Agnew on CFRB, is touted as the spiritual successor of Bite Network Radio, it follows a different format and has no formal association to the LAW.

=== UFC Post Fight Show on TSN Radio ===
UFC Post Fight Show on TSN Radio
- Genre: Sports talk
- Running time: 60, 90 or 120 minutes (dependent on host stations other programming commitments)
- Country of origin: Canada
- Language: English
- Home station: CHUM (December 2011–present)
- Starring: John Pollock (2011–present); Jason Agnew (2011–present)
- Created by: Jason Agnew, John Pollock
- Produced by: John Pollock (2011–present)
- Recording studio: Toronto, Ontario
- Original release: December 10, 2011 – present
- No. of episodes: 10 (as of June 24, 2012)
- Audio format: Monaural sound (December 2011–present)
- Sponsored by: Live Audio Wrestling
- Website: http://www.liveaudiowrestling.com
- Podcast: http://lawradio.podbean.com

Starting in 2011 with UFC 140, The LAW started to present a UFC post fight show on TSN Radio 1050. The show airs after the conclusion of the most recent Ultimate Fighting Championship event and provides results and opinions from callers and MMA journalists. Though originally branded as a LAW show, since the launch of The MMA Report the show has used the latter show's branding.

=== Review-An-Impact ===
Each Saturday (some episodes may be delayed to Sunday), former WWE writer Brian Mann and frequent LAW contributor Nate Milton review the previous edition of Impact Wrestling.

Originally hosted by John Pollock and Wai Ting as a counterpart to Review-a-Raw, the first episode of Review-An-Impact was posted on November 5, 2010. Since September 2011, Nate Milton (nicknamed "The Godfather, TNAte" in the LAW community) has been featured in a recurring segment on Review-An-Impact where he provides separate analysis of the episode; this was often in the form of an interview with one of the co-hosts. In the event that either host was unavailable, Nate takes on the role of co-host for the entire podcast in place of the segment. In late 2014, due to Wai Ting's other commitments, Nate Milton became a co-host on a more full-time basis, though the arrangement lasted for only a few weeks due to the termination of Impact Wrestling on Spike TV; Wai Ting's final episode of Review-An-Impact was on October 23, 2014.

With the relaunch of Impact Wrestling on Destination America, Review-An-Impact was revamped with Brian Mann as the lead host, initially with John Pollock as co-host in the pilot episode on January 8, 2015, and with Nate Milton as co-host on a full-time basis on the following episode. Due to being the first "all-American podcast" in the LAW family, and with neither co-host hosting another LAW podcast, Review-An-Impact also expanded their scope to include their commentary on general wrestling news, diversity issues in professional wrestling, pop culture (largely as a result of Brian later joining Yahoo! Movies), and politics in general.

With the declining relevance of TNA in North American professional wrestling in 2015 (and the impending end of the TNA/Destination America partnership), Live Audio Wrestling decided to terminate coverage of TNA following the 2015 Bound for Glory event; the final regular episode of Review-an-Impact (an episode dedicated to counting down the "Top 10 moments in Impact Wrestling history") aired on October 3, 2015.

=== Keep It 100 ===
Billed as "the realest show about being fake", Keep it 100 is a podcast that serves as a spiritual successor to Review-An-Impact, hosted by Brian Mann and Nate Milton. The idea behind the show came from the viewer feedback segments from Review-an-Impact, where general questions regarding the co-hosts' opinions started to dominate the discourse as opposed to feedback related to episodes of the episodes of Impact Wrestling being reviewed. With Live Audio Wrestling deciding to terminate coverage of TNA, it was agreed that the viewer feedback segment would effectively be expanded to cover the entire show.

The concept of this podcast, where the co-hosts must answer every question asked of them with absolute truth, was largely inspired by the segment of the same name on The Nightly Show with Larry Wilmore. Similar to its predecessor, topics covered by the show are primarily focused on general wrestling news, diversity in professional wrestling, wrestling as it relates to pop culture, with a slight nod to politics. The first episode aired on October 9, 2015.

Due to the hosts' other commitments, Keep It 100 aired for only seven weeks as a weekly series, though various special shows have been posted on an irregular basis, including those dedicated to covering TNA special events.

=== Review-A-Merica ===
"Review-A-Merica" was a one-off podcast covering the 2012 United States presidential election from the perspective of two Canadians (John and Wai).

In 2016, Brian and Nate revived the "Review-A-Merica" podcast for a series of shows covering the 2016 United States presidential election from a "wrestling with democracy" perspective.

=== Ask-A-Wai Video Podcast ===
The Ask-A-Wai name would later be reused for a video podcast series featuring John Pollock and Wai Ting in late 2011, as a complement to Review-A-Wai, where John Pollock and Wai Ting answered questions submitted by Review-A-Wai fans regarding pro wrestling and mixed martial arts. Though originally filmed in the "Review-A-Wai studios" at Fight Network, later entries were filmed in various locations in and around downtown Toronto. A short-lived revival of Ask-A-Wai was also posted as a YouTube series on the Live Audio Wrestling YouTube channel in 2015, it ended in May 2016.

The Ask-A-Wai name would be used following the shutdown of the LAW, as a monthly audio podcast for Patreon supporters of Post Wrestling.

=== CWCeen ===
In 2016, a separate show, CWCeen, was added to the end of whtsNXT, covering the WWE Cruiserweight Classic. This show was hosted by Braden Herrington and Wai Ting, and includes banter on their common love of hip-hop, as well as the fact that Braden Herrington had joined Fight Network after leaving TSN Radio.

== End of Year Awards ==
Awards are given over the course of two episodes: the Best of episode, typically the last episode of the year under consideration or the first episode of the following year, and the Worst of episode, awarded the first week without a pay-per-view event after the Best of episode. Each host of the show nominates a pick in each category, and may also name "ties" (&) and "honourable mentions" (h/m) in each category.

Both Wai Ting and Braden Herrington have officially joined the other three hosts to hand out their Best of Awards & Worst of Awards. Ting in both 2012 and 2013, & Herrington in both 2014 and 2016.

The LAW: Best of Awards
- Best Wrestler: Male

Year	Dan “The Mouth” Lovranski	Jason Agnew	John Pollock	Wai Ting	Braden Herrington
2008	Shawn Michaels (WWE)	Edge (WWE)	Nigel McGuinness (ROH)		
2009	Chris Jericho (WWE)	Chris Jericho (WWE)	Chris Jericho (WWE)		
2010	The Miz (WWE)	The Miz (WWE)	John Cena (WWE)		
2011	CM Punk (WWE)	CM Punk (WWE)	Hiroshi Tanahashi (NJPW & CMLL)		
2012	Michael Elgin (ROH & PWG)	Dolph Ziggler (WWE)	Hiroshi Tanahashi (NJPW & CMLL)	CM Punk (WWE)	
2013	Daniel Bryan (WWE)	Daniel Bryan (WWE)	Hiroshi Tanahashi (NJPW & CMLL)	Daniel Bryan (WWE)	
2014	Katsuyori Shibata (NJPW)	Sami Zayn (WWE)	Shinsuke Nakamura (NJPW)		Dolph Ziggler (WWE)
2015	Shinsuke Nakamura (NJPW) * h/m AJ Styles (ROH & NJPW)	Jay Lethal (ROH)	AJ Styles (ROH & NJPW)		
2016	Kenny Omega (NJPW)	AJ Styles (NJPW & ROH & WWE)	AJ Styles (NJPW & ROH & WWE)		AJ Styles (NJPW & ROH & WWE)

- Best Wrestler: Female

Year	Dan “The Mouth” Lovranski	Jason Agnew	John Pollock	Wai Ting	Braden Herrington
2008	Beth Phoenix (WWE) * h/m Trish Stratus (WWE)	Gail Kim (TNA)	Gail Kim (TNA)		
2009	Beth Phoenix (WWE)	Beth Phoenix (WWE)	Ayako Hamada (TNA & Shimmer)		
2010	Natalya (WWE)	LayCool (WWE)	Sara Del Rey (Shimmer, Chikara & ROH)		
2011	Sara Del Rey (Shimmer, Chikara & ROH)	Madison Rayne (TNA)	Sara Del Rey (Shimmer, Chikara & ROH)		
2012	Tara (TNA)	Tara (TNA) & Ronda Rousey (SF & UFC)	Tara (TNA)	Ronda Rousey (SF & UFC)	
2013	Mickie James (TNA)	AJ Lee (WWE)	AJ Lee (WWE)	AJ Lee (WWE)	
2014	Charlotte (WWE)	Charlotte (WWE)	Natalya (WWE)		Charlotte (WWE)
2015	Bayley (WWE)	Bayley (WWE)	Sasha Banks (WWE)		
2016	Charlotte (WWE)	Charlotte (WWE)	Charlotte (WWE) * h/m Auska (WWE)		Charlotte (WWE)

- Best Tag Team

Year	Dan “The Mouth” Lovranski	Jason Agnew	John Pollock	Wai Ting	Braden Herrington
2008	John Morrison and The Miz (WWE) * h/m Beer Money, Inc. (TNA)	John Morrison and The Miz (WWE) * h/m Beer Money, Inc. (TNA)	Beer Money, Inc. (TNA)		
2009	Jeri-Show (WWE)	Jeri-Show (WWE)	Beer Money, Inc. (TNA)		
2010	The Motor City Machine Guns (TNA & ROH) & Beer Money, Inc. (TNA)	The Motor City Machine Guns (TNA & ROH)	Kings of Wrestling (ROH & Noah)		
2011	The Briscoe Brothers (ROH)	Beer Money, Inc. (TNA)	Beer Money, Inc. (TNA)		
2012	Daniels and Kazarian (TNA)	Daniels and Kazarian (TNA)	Daniels and Kazarian (TNA)	Daniels and Kazarian (TNA)	
2013	Goldust and Cody Rhodes (WWE)	Goldust and Cody Rhodes (WWE)	The Shield (WWE)	Goldust and Cody Rhodes (WWE)	
2014	reDRagon (ROH & NJPW)	The Young Bucks (ROH, NJPW & PWG)	The Young Bucks (ROH, NJPW & PWG)		The Young Bucks (ROH, NJPW & PWG)
2015	The Young Bucks (ROH, NJPW & PWG)	Jason Jordan and Chad Gable (WWE)	reDRagon (ROH & NJPW)		
2016	The Young Bucks (ROH, NJPW & PWG)	The Young Bucks (ROH, NJPW & PWG)	The Young Bucks (ROH, NJPW & PWG)		The Revival (WWE)

- Best on the Mic

This award is given to the wrestler or mixed martial artist who is the most natural at cutting promos or otherwise conversing on the microphone.
From 2017 this award will be spit in two with "Best Wrestler on the Mic" & "Best Mixed Martial Artist on the Mic".

Year	Dan “The Mouth” Lovranski	Jason Agnew	John Pollock	Wai Ting	Braden Herrington
2008	Chris Jericho	Santino Marella	Santino Marella		
2009	CM Punk (h/m Chris Jericho)	CM Punk	Frank Mir		
2010	The Miz	The Miz	Chael Sonnen		
2011	CM Punk	CM Punk	CM Punk		
2012	Paul Heyman	CM Punk	CM Punk	CM Punk	
2013	Bully Ray	Paul Heyman	CM Punk	Bully Ray	
2014	Conor McGregor	Paul Heyman & Conor McGregor	Conor McGregor		Paul Heyman
2015	Conor McGregor	Conor McGregor	Conor McGregor		
2016	Conor McGregor (Kevin Owens)	Kevin Owens & Chis Jericho(h/m: Enzo)	(MMA) Conor McGregor (Wrestler) Kevin Owens		(MMA) Conor McGregor (Wrestler) Kevin Owens & Chris Jericho

- Best Announcer

This award is given to the wrestling or mixed martial arts announcer, whether play-by-play or colour commentary.

Year	Dan “The Mouth” Lovranski	Jason Agnew	John Pollock	Wai Ting	Braden Herrington
2008	Matt Striker	Matt Striker & Joe Rogan	Matt Striker		
2009	Frank Mir	Joe Rogan	Mauro Ranallo		
2010	Mauro Ranallo	Joe Rogan	Joe Rogan		
2011	Joe Rogan	Joe Rogan	Pat Miletich		
2012	Joe Rogan	Joe Rogan	Nigel McGuinness	Joe Rogan	
2013	William Regal	Joe Rogan	NJPW's Shinpei Nogami	Joe Rogan	
2014	Steve Corino & Brian Stann	Joe Rogan	Brian Stann		Steve Corino & John "Bradshaw" Layfield
2015	Mauro Ranallo (h/m Steve Corino)	Joe Rogan	Mauro Ranallo		
2016	Corey Graves	Corey Graves	Steve Corino		Corey Graves

- Best Non-Wrestling Performer

This award is given to the best performer in the world of wrestling that does not participate in matches, such as managers and valets.

Year	Dan “The Mouth” Lovranski	Jason Agnew	John Pollock	Wai Ting	Braden Herrington
2008	Vickie Guerrero	Vickie Guerrero	Vickie Guerrero		
2009	Jim Cornette	Don West	Don West		
2010	Vickie Guerrero	Eric Bischoff & Michael Cole	Vickie Guerrero		
2011	John Laurinaitis	Ricardo Rodriguez	Karen Jarrett		
2012	Paul Heyman	Paul Heyman	Joseph Park	Paul Heyman	
2013	Paul Heyman	Zeb Colter	Paul Heyman	Zeb Colter	
2014	Lana	Rockstar Spud (h/m WWE referee Darrick Moore)	Paul Heyman		Paul Heyman
2015	Dario Cueto	Paul Heyman	Paul Heyman (h/m Dario Cueto)		
2016	Vanguard 1 & Señor Benjamin & King Maxel	Allie	Tom Phillips (h/m: King Maxel) (h/m: Renee Young)		Paul Heyman

- Most Improved

This award is given to the wrestler or fighter who has improved the most in terms of their skills development.

Year	Dan “The Mouth” Lovranski	Jason Agnew	John Pollock	Wai Ting	Braden Herrington
2008	Brock Lesnar	Rashad Evans	Kenny Florian		
2009	The Miz	Eric Young (h/m Kofi Kingston) (h/m The Miz)	Brutus Magnus		
2010	The Miz	Alberto Del Rio (h/m John Morrison)	The Miz		
2011	Dolph Ziggler (h/m Brooke Tessmacher)	Dolph Ziggler	Mark Henry (h/m Devon)		
2012	Kazuchika Okada	Kazarian	Kazuchika Okada	Austin Aries	
2013	Magnus	Magnus	Adam Cole	Team Alpha Male	
2014	Bobby Lashley	Ethan Carter III	Ethan Carter III		Tyson Kidd
2015	Corey Graves	Corey Graves	Rafael dos Anjos & Jay Lethal		
2016	AJ Styles	Alexa Bliss	The Miz (h/m: Guerrillas of Destiny) (h/m: David Finlay)		Tye Dillinger

- Best Comeback

This award is given to the wrestler or fighter who has maintained their form after a long absence from wrestling or fighting.

Year	Dan “The Mouth” Lovranski	Jason Agnew	John Pollock	Wai Ting	Braden Herrington
2008	Frank Mir	Brock Lesnar	Frank Mir		
2009	Maryse as "The Gobbledy Gooker"	Ricky Steamboat	Ricky Steamboat		
2010	Bret Hart (h/m Jerry Lawler)	Chris Leben	Paul Bearer & Stephan Bonnar		
2011	Mark Henry (h/m Frankie Edgar)	Mark Henry (h/m Cheick Kongo)	The Rock		
2012	Brock Lesnar	Brock Lesnar	Antônio Rodrigo Nogueira	Ryback	
2013	Goldust	Goldust	Goldust & Robbie Lawler	Goldust	
2014	The Ultimate Warrior & Dominick Cruz	Bobby Lashley	Dominick Cruz		Sting (h/m The Ultimate Warrior)
2015	The Dudley Boyz (h/m Andrei Arlovski)	Samoa Joe	Tetsuya Naito		
2016	Goldberg	Goldberg	Goldberg		Goldberg

- Best Gimmick

This award is given to the best character or character trait in wrestling or mixed martial arts. First awarded in 2008 as a last-minute addition to the list of awards.

Year	Dan “The Mouth” Lovranski	Jason Agnew	John Pollock	Wai Ting	Braden Herrington
2008	Santino Marella	Santino Marella	Santino Marella		
2009	CM Punk as straight-edge character	CM Punk as straight-edge character	CM Punk as straight-edge character		
2010	Nexus	The Miz after winning Money in the Bank	Jay Lethal impersonating Ric Flair & Jeff Jarrett as a MMA fighter		
2011	Cody Rhodes as disfigured character	Ronda Rousey defeating opponents with the Armbar	Ronda Rousey defeating opponents with the Armbar		
2012	Damien Sandow	Daniel Bryan 'Yes!' Chant	Bully Ray	Joseph Park	
2013	The Wyatt Family	Aiden English	The Shield	Antonio Cesaro's Big Swing	
2014	Rusev	Damien Mizdow	Rusev and Lana		Tyler Breeze
2015	The New Day (h/m Beer City Brusier)	Bayley (h/m Dalton Castle)	Bayley		
2016	Broken Matt Hardy	Broken Matt Hardy &Brother Nero	Broken Matt Hardy		Broken Matt Hardy

- Match of the Year

This award is given to the best wrestling match of the year.

Year	Dan “The Mouth” Lovranski	Jason Agnew	John Pollock	Wai Ting	Braden Herrington
2008	Shawn Michaels vs. Ric Flair (WrestleMania XXIV)	Samoa Joe vs. Kurt Angle (TNA Lockdown) (h/m Shawn Michaels vs. Ric Flair (WrestleMania XXIV))	Samoa Joe vs. Kurt Angle (TNA Lockdown)		
2009	Edge vs. Jeff Hardy (WWE Extreme Rules)	Chris Jericho vs. Rey Mysterio (WWE The Bash) & Edge vs. Jeff Hardy (WWE Extreme Rules)	The Undertaker vs. Shawn Michaels (WrestleMania XXV)		
2010	The Undertaker vs. Shawn Michaels (WrestleMania XXVI)	Daniel Bryan vs. Dolph Ziggler (WWE Bragging Rights) (h/m The Undertaker vs. Shawn Michaels (WrestleMania XXVI))	Tyler Black vs. Davey Richards (ROH Death Before Dishonor VIII)		
2011	John Cena vs. CM Punk (WWE Money in the Bank) (h/m Davey Richards vs. Eddie Edwards (ROH Best in the World))	John Cena vs. CM Punk (WWE Money in the Bank) & Dolph Ziggler vs. Randy Orton (WWE Raw)	Davey Richards vs. Eddie Edwards (ROH Best in the World)		
2012	Davey Richards vs. Michael Elgin (Showdown in the Sun)	Brock Lesnar vs. John Cena (WWE Extreme Rules)	The Undertaker vs Triple H (WrestleMania 28)	The Undertaker vs Triple H (WrestleMania 28)	
2013	Katsuyori Shibata vs. Tomohiro Ishii (G-1 Climax, Day 4)	The Undertaker vs. CM Punk (WrestleMania 29)	Katsuyori Shibata vs. Tomohiro Ishii (G-1 Climax, Day 4)	Shinsuke Nakamura vs. Kazushi Sakuraba (Wrestle Kingdom VII)	
2014	Hiroshi Tanahashi vs. Katsuyori Shibata (NJPW Destruction in Kobe)	Charlotte vs. Natalya (NXT Takeover)	Atlantis vs. Último Guerrero (CMLL 81st Anniversary Show)		Charlotte vs. Natalya (NXT Takeover)
2015	Shinsuke Nakamura vs. Kota Ibushi (Wrestle Kingdom 9) (h/m Shinsuke Nakamura vs. Roderick Strong (Global Wars '15))	Bayley vs. Sasha Banks (NXT TakeOver: Brooklyn)	Shinsuke Nakamura vs. Kota Ibushi (Wrestle Kingdom 9)		
2016	Kenny Omega vs. Tetsuya Naito (G1 Climax)	The Miz vs. Cesaro vs. Kevin Owens vs. Sami Zayn (Extreme Rules)	Kazuchika Okada vs. Hiroshi Tanahashi (Wrestle Kingdom 10) (h/m) Kenny Omega vs. Tetsuya Naito (G1 Climax) (h/m) Will Ospreay, Ricochet, & Matt Sydal vs. Adam Cole & The Young Bucks (Battle Of Los Angeles - Stage 2)		Sami Zayn vs. Shinsuke Nakamura (Takeover: Dallas)

- Feud of the Year

This award is given to the best protracted storyline, typically between wrestlers, but the award is not strictly restricted to wrestling.

Year	Dan “The Mouth” Lovranski	Jason Agnew	John Pollock	Wai Ting	Braden Herrington
2008	Chris Jericho vs. Shawn Michaels (h/m Edge vs. The Undertaker)	Chris Jericho vs. Shawn Michaels	Chris Jericho vs. Shawn Michaels		
2009	CM Punk vs. Jeff Hardy (h/m Rashad Evans vs. Quinton Jackson)	CM Punk vs. Jeff Hardy	Brock Lesnar vs. Frank Mir (h/m Chris Jericho vs. Rey Mysterio)		
2010	Kevin Steen vs. El Generico	Anderson Silva vs. Chael Sonnen	Georges St-Pierre vs. Josh Koscheck		
2011	Kevin Steen vs. Ring of Honor	Ultimate Fighting Championship vs. Spike TV	Ultimate Fighting Championship vs. Spike TV		
2012	Jon Jones vs. Rashad Evans	Ronda Rousey vs Cris "Cyborg" Santos	Anderson Silva vs. Chael Sonnen	Anderson Silva vs. Chael Sonnen	
2013	CM Punk vs. Paul Heyman	Ronda Rousey vs. Miesha Tate	Hiroshi Tanahashi vs. Kazuchika Okada & Georges St-Pierre vs. Nick Diaz	Ronda Rousey vs. Miesha Tate	
2014	Jon Jones vs. Daniel Cormier	Jon Jones vs. Daniel Cormier	Jon Jones vs. Daniel Cormier		Daniel Bryan vs. Triple H
2015	José Aldo vs. Conor McGregor	José Aldo vs. Conor McGregor	José Aldo vs. Conor McGregor		
2016	Conor McGregor vs. Nate Diaz (UFC) & Brock Lesnar vs. Goldberg (WWE) (h/m) The Miz vs. Daniel Bryan (WWE)	Billy Corgan vs. Impact Ventures LLC (TNA)	Conor McGregor vs. Nate Diaz (UFC) & Ricochet vs. Will Ospreay (Evolve/NJPW/PWG/OTT)		Aj Styles vs. John Cena (WWE)

- Best Angle

This award is given to the best individual moment or plot device (typically in professional wrestling, though noteworthy mixed martial arts events may also be nominated) in the past year.

Year	Dan “The Mouth” Lovranski	Jason Agnew	John Pollock	Wai Ting	Braden Herrington
2008	Randy Orton creates The Legacy	Santino Marella and the Honk-a-Meter	CM Punk winning Money in the Bank and the fallout		
2009	Chris Jericho and The Big Show teaming together	Build to Chris Jericho vs. Rey Mysterio, WWE Intercontinental Championship vs. Mask match	Randy Orton punts Vince McMahon		
2010	Jerry Lawler vs. The Miz development	The debut of Nexus	The debut of Nexus		
2011	CM Punk leaves WWE with the WWE Championship	CM Punk leaves WWE with the WWE Championship	CM Punk leaves WWE with the WWE Championship		
2012	Ryback squash matches	CM Punk holding WWE Title all year	Austin Aries trades in X Title and wins TNA Title at Destination X	Bound for Glory Series	
2013	Mark Henry fake retirement	Rhodes Family Firing / Return to WWE	Mark Henry fake retirement	Rhodes Family Firing / Return to WWE	
2014	The Shield breakup	Sami Zayn’s rode to the NXT title	Jon Jones and Daniel Cormier hotel lobby brawl		The Shield breakup
2015	Brock Lesnar and The Undertaker’s brawl on Raw	John Cena U.S Title Open Challenge	Brock Lesnar and The Undertaker’s brawl on Raw		
2016	Goldberg beats Brock Lesnar in under 2 min's (Survivor Series)	Bullet Club shaves Jay Lethal head (ROH/NJPW)	Kenny Omega & Bullet Club kick out AJ Styles (NJPW) (h/m) Miz & Daniel Bryan (Talking Smack)		Goldberg beats Brock Lesnar in under 2 min's (Survivor Series)

- Best Pay-Per-View

Originally there was a single award covering both wrestling and mixed martial arts pay-per-view events. In 2010, this category was split to two separate awards for wrestling events and mixed martial arts events.

Year	Dan “The Mouth” Lovranski	Jason Agnew	John Pollock	Wai Ting	Braden Herrington
2008	WrestleMania XXIV	UFC 91	WWE No Mercy		
2009	UFC 100	UFC 100	UFC 100		

- Best Wrestling Pay-Per-View

In 2014 the wrestling event category expanded to include Network Events and was no longer restricted to just pay-per-view events.

Year	Dan “The Mouth” Lovranski	Jason Agnew	John Pollock	Wai Ting	Braden Herrington
2010	ROH Death Before Dishonor VIII	WWE Money in the Bank	ROH Death Before Dishonor VIII		
2011	WWE Money in the Bank	WWE Money in the Bank	WWE Money in the Bank		
2012	ROH Glory By Honor XI	WWE TLC	WWE Extreme Rules	WrestleMania 28	
2013	G-1 Climax Day 4 in Osaka	WWE Payback	G-1 Climax Day 4 in Osaka	WWE SummerSlam	
2014	ROH Global Wars	NXT TakeOver: R Evolution	G-1 Climax Day 7 in Tokyo		WrestleMania 30
2015	Wrestle Kingdom 9	NXT TakeOver: Brooklyn	Wrestle Kingdom 9		
2016	Final Battle (ROH)	Takeover: Toronto	King Of Pro Wrestling (NJPW)		Takeover: Toronto

- Best Mixed Martial Arts Fight Card

In 2011 the mixed martial arts event category expanded to include Fight Cards and was no longer restricted to just pay-per-view events.

Year	Dan “The Mouth” Lovranski	Jason Agnew	John Pollock	Wai Ting	Braden Herrington
2010	WEC 48	UFC 116	UFC 116		
2011	UFC 139	UFC 139	UFC 139		
2012	UFC 154	UFC 146	UFC 146	UFC 148	
2013	UFC 166	UFC Fight Night 26	UFC 166	UFC 166	
2014	UFC 178	UFC 178	UFC Fight Night 55		UFC 171
2015	UFC 189	UFC 194	UFC 189		
2016	UFC 206	UFC 205	UFC 196		UFC 205

- Best Promotion

This award is given to the best wrestling or mixed martial arts organization in the past year.

Year	Dan “The Mouth” Lovranski	Jason Agnew	John Pollock	Wai Ting	Braden Herrington
2008	Ultimate Fighting Championship	Ultimate Fighting Championship	Ultimate Fighting Championship		
2009	Ultimate Fighting Championship	Ultimate Fighting Championship	Ultimate Fighting Championship		
2010	World Extreme Cagefighting	Ultimate Fighting Championship	Ultimate Fighting Championship		
2011	Ultimate Fighting Championship	Ultimate Fighting Championship	Ultimate Fighting Championship		
2012	Ultimate Fighting Championship	Ultimate Fighting Championship	Ultimate Fighting Championship	Ultimate Fighting Championship	
2013	New Japan Pro-Wrestling	Ultimate Fighting Championship	Ultimate Fighting Championship	Ultimate Fighting Championship	
2014	New Japan Pro-Wrestling & NXT	NXT	New Japan Pro-Wrestling		NXT
2015	Ultimate Fighting Championship	Ultimate Fighting Championship	Ultimate Fighting Championship		
2016	Ultimate Fighting Championship (h/m) PWG	Ultimate Fighting Championship	Ultimate Fighting Championship (h/m) NJPW		WWE

- Best Television Show

Jason Agnew did not make a pick for 2011, as he did not watch The Ultimate Fighter: Team Bisping vs. Team Miller, which he otherwise felt as the best TV show.

Year	Dan “The Mouth” Lovranski	Jason Agnew	John Pollock	Wai Ting	Braden Herrington
2008	The Ultimate Fighter: Team Nogueira vs. Team Mir	The Ultimate Fighter: Team Nogueira vs. Team Mir	The Ultimate Fighter: Team Nogueira vs. Team Mir		
2009	The Ultimate Fighter: Heavyweights (h/m UFC Countdown)	WWE Vintage Collection	The Ultimate Fighter: Heavyweights		
2010	Ring of Honor Wrestling (h/m The Ultimate Fighter: Team GSP vs. Team Koscheck)	WWE Raw	The Ultimate Fighter: Team GSP vs. Team Koscheck		
2011	The Ultimate Fighter: Team Bisping vs. Team Miller	—N/a	The Ultimate Fighter: Team Bisping vs. Team Miller		
2012	UFC on FOX 5	UFC on FOX	Fight Factory	FOX's Road to the Octagon & UFC Primetime	
2013	NXT	NXT	Total Divas	Total Divas	
2014	NXT	Lucha Underground	NXT		NXT
2015	Ring of Honor Wrestling	Lucha Underground	Lucha Underground		
2016	Ring of Honor Wrestling	Talking Smack	WWE SmackDown		NXT (h/m) Cruiserweight Classic

- Best Book

This award is given to the best book relating to wrestling or mixed martial arts. Jason Agnew does not normally give an award due to his commitments for other shows precluding him from reading too many candidates. In 2016 no award was given for "Best Book".

Year	Dan “The Mouth” Lovranski	Jason Agnew	John Pollock	Wai Ting	Braden Herrington
2008	"Adventures in Larry Land" by Larry Zbyszko	—N/a	"Total MMA" by Jonathan Snowden		
2009	"Drawing Heat the Hard Way" by Larry Matysik (h/m "Queen of the Ring" by Jeff Leen) (h/m "The Midnight Express 25th Anniversary Scrapbook" by Jim Cornette)	—N/a	"The Midnight Express 25th Anniversary Scrapbook" by Jim Cornette		
2010	"Minnesota's Golden Age of Wrestling" by George Schire & "The MMA Encyclopedia" by Jonathan Snowden and Kendall Shields	—N/a	"Countdown to Lockdown" by Mick Foley		
2011	"The Last Outlaw" by Stan Hansen	—N/a	"Let's Get It On" by Big John McCarthy and Loretta Hunt		
2012	"Heroes & Icons" by Greg Oliver and Steven Johnson	—N/a	"Shooters" by Jonathan Snowden	—N/a	
2013	"The Hardcore Truth" by Hardcore Holly & "Mad Dogs, Midgets and Screw Jobs" by Pat Laprade and Bertrand Hebert	—N/a	"Mad Dogs, Midgets and Screw Jobs" by Pat Laprade & Bertrand Hébert	—N/a	
2014	"The Best in the World…At What I Have No Idea" by Chris Jericho	—N/a	"The Best in the World…At What I Have No Idea" by Chris Jericho		—N/a
2015	—N/a	—N/a	"Capitol Revolution: The Rise of the McMahon Wrestling Empire" by Tim Hornbaker (h/m "Lion's Pride: The Turbulent History of New Japan Pro Wrestling" by Chris Charlton)		
2016	—N/a	—N/a	—N/a		—N/a

- Best DVD / Original Programming

This award is given to the best compilation or documentary on wrestling or mixed martial arts in the past year which have been released on DVD. Originally "Best DVD" until 2015 when this category was expanded to include non in-ring programing.

Year	Dan “The Mouth” Lovranski	Jason Agnew	John Pollock	Wai Ting	Braden Herrington
2008	"Viva la Raza: The Life and Times of Eddie Guerrero" (h/m "The Life and Times of Mr. Perfect")	"The Life and Times of Mr. Perfect"	Ric Flair shoot interview on Highspots		
2009	"Jeff Hardy: My Life, My Rules"	"The Wrestler"	"Starrcade: The Essential Collection"		
2010	"Chris Jericho: Breaking the Code"	"Chris Jericho: Breaking the Code"	"Chris Jericho: Breaking the Code"		
2011	"WWE Greatest Rivalries: Bret Hart vs. Shawn Michaels" (h/m "Memphis Heat")	"Memphis Heat" & "WWE Greatest Rivalries: Bret Hart vs. Shawn Michaels" (h/m "Randy Orton: The Evolution of a Predator")	"Memphis Heat"		
2012	"CM Punk: Best in the World"	"CM Punk: Best in the World"	"CM Punk: Best in the World"	"CM Punk: Best in the World"	
2013	"The Legends of Mid-South Wrestling"	"WWE 50th Anniversary"	"Bret Hart: The Dungeon Collection" (h/m "Jim Crockett Promotions: The Good Old Days")	"Triple H: Thy Kingdom Come:	
2014	"Ladies and Gentlemen, My Name is Paul Heyman"	"Ladies and Gentlemen, My Name is Paul Heyman"	"Ladies and Gentlemen, My Name is Paul Heyman"		"Ladies and Gentlemen, My Name is Paul Heyman"
2015	"Table for 3"	"Table for 3"	"Table for 3"		
2016	Talking Smack	"The Edge and Christian Show That Totally Reeks of Awesomeness"	Talking Smack		Talking Smack "The Edge and Christian Show That Totally Reeks of Awesomeness"

- Best Fighter: Mixed Martial Artist

Year	Dan “The Mouth” Lovranski	Jason Agnew	John Pollock	Wai Ting	Braden Herrington
2008	Anderson Silva	Georges St-Pierre (h/m Kenny Florian)	Georges St-Pierre		
2009	Anderson Silva	Gegard Mousasi	Georges St-Pierre		
2010	Frankie Edgar	Cain Velasquez	Georges St-Pierre		
2011	Jon Jones	Jon Jones	Jon Jones		
2012	Benson Henderson	Anderson Silva	Ronda Rousey	Benson Henderson	
2013	Chris Weidman	Vitor Belfort	Chris Weidman (^ Cain Velasquez)	Demetrious Johnson	
2014	Robbie Lawler	Robbie Lawler	Rory MacDonald		Ronda Rousey
2015	Conor McGregor	Conor McGregor	Conor McGregor		
2016	Conor McGregor	Michael Bisping	Stipe Miočić		Conor McGregor

- MMA Fight of the Year

This award is given to the best single match on a mixed martial arts card in the past year.

Year	Dan “The Mouth” Lovranski	Jason Agnew	John Pollock	Wai Ting	Braden Herrington
2008	Forrest Griffin vs. Quinton Jackson (UFC 86) (h/m Urijah Faber vs. Jens Pulver (WEC 38))	Cung Le vs. Frank Shamrock (Strikeforce: Shamrock vs. Le)	Eddie Alvarez vs. Joachim Hansen (Dream 3)		
2009	Ben Henderson vs. Donald Cerrone (WEC 43) & Diego Sanchez vs. Clay Guida (The Ultimate Fighter: United States vs. United Kingdom Finale)	Scott Smith vs. Cung Le (Strikeforce: Evolution)	Diego Sanchez vs. Clay Guida (The Ultimate Fighter: United States vs. United Kingdom Finale)		
2010	Leonard Garcia vs. Chan Sung Jung (WEC 48) (h/m Ben Henderson vs. Anthony Pettis (WEC 53))	Anderson Silva vs. Chael Sonnen (UFC 117)	Ben Henderson vs. Anthony Pettis (WEC 53)		
2011	Dan Henderson vs. Maurício Rua (UFC 139)	Dan Henderson vs. Maurício Rua (UFC 139)	Diego Sanchez vs. Martin Kampmann (UFC Live: Sanchez vs. Kampmann)		
2012	Benson Henderson vs. Frankie Edgar (UFC 144)	Georges St-Pierre vs. Carlos Condit (UFC 154)	Joe Lauzon vs. Jamie Varner (UFC on FOX 4)	Benson Henderson vs. Frankie Edgar (UFC 144)	
2013	Mark Hunt vs. Antonio Silva (UFC Fight Night 33) (h/m Gilbert Melendez vs Diego Sanchez (UFC 166))	Johny Hendricks vs. Carlos Condit (UFC 158)	Gilbert Melendez vs. Diego Sanchez (UFC 166)	Mark Hunt vs. Antonio Silva (UFC Fight Night 33	
2014	Johny Hendricks vs. Robbie Lawler (UFC 171)	Matt Brown vs. Erick Silva (UFC Fight Night: Brown vs. Silva)	Johny Hendricks vs. Robbie Lawler (UFC 171)		—N/a
2015	Robbie Lawler vs. Rory MacDonald (UFC 189)	Robbie Lawler vs. Rory MacDonald (UFC 189)	Robbie Lawler vs. Rory MacDonald (UFC 189)		
2016	Cub Swanson vs. Doo Ho Choi (UFC 206) (h/m) Robbie Lawler vs. Carlos Condit (UFC 195)	Conor McGregor vs. Nate Diaz (UFC 202)	Cub Swanson vs. Doo Ho Choi (UFC 206) (h/m) Robbie Lawler vs. Carlos Condit (UFC 195)		Conor McGregor vs. Nate Diaz (UFC 196) & Conor McGregor vs. Nate Diaz (UFC 202)

- Moment of the Year

This award was only given in 2008 to the best individual wrestling or mixed martial arts moment in the past year.

Year	Dan “The Mouth” Lovranski	Jason Agnew	John Pollock	Wai Ting	Braden Herrington
2008	Retirement of Ric Flair (h/m Return of Randy Couture)	Brock Lesnar defeats Randy Couture (h/m Retirement of Ric Flair)	Brock Lesnar winning the UFC Heavyweight Championship & Floyd Mayweather Jr. appearing at WWE No Way Out		

- Best Raw Guest Host

This award was only given in 2009 due to the use of guest hosts for WWE Raw.

Year	Dan “The Mouth” Lovranski	Jason Agnew	John Pollock	Wai Ting	Braden Herrington
2009	Jesse Ventura	Jesse Ventura	Jesse Ventura		

- Best LAW Interview

This award is given to the best interview segment that aired on the LAW or an associated podcast in the past year. It was first awarded in 2010.

Year	Dan “The Mouth” Lovranski	Jason Agnew	John Pollock	Wai Ting	Braden Herrington
2010	Marty Jannetty	Jim Mitchell	Marty Jannetty (h/m Lex Luger) (h/m Paul Bearer)		
2011	Stan Hansen	Chris Jericho	Barry Blaustein (h/m Teddy Hart)		
2012	Vader	Chris Jericho and Dave Meltzer roundtable	Chris Jericho and Dave Meltzer roundtable	Chris Jericho and Dave Meltzer roundtable	
2013	Santino Marella (h/m Lance Russell) (h/m George "The Animal" Steel) (h/m Maria Kanellis)	Mickie James	Jim Ross	Teddy Hart and Spencer Tapley	
2014	The Killer Bees (h/m Stardust) (h/mPaul Heymen) (h/m Tugboat)	EC3 - Ethan Carter III (h/m Ric Flair)	Jeff Hardy (h/m EC3 - Ethan Carter III)		Jeff Hardy (h/m Barbie Blank)
2015	Steve Corino & Bob Backlund & Jason Hervey	Rockstar Spud	Mick Foley & Chris Jerricho (Show dedicated to Roddy Piper) (h/m Rockstar Spud) (h/m Len Denton) (h/m Bret Hart)		
2016	Stan Henson	Chris Jericho	Stan Henson & Jake "The Snake" Roberts & Chris Jericho & Goldberg		Chris Jericho

- Biggest Story of the Year

This award is given to the biggest news story in wrestling or mixed martial arts in the past year. It was first awarded in 2014.

Year	Dan “The Mouth” Lovranski	Jason Agnew	John Pollock	Wai Ting	Braden Herrington
2014	The launch of the WWE Network	The launch of the WWE Network & Scott Coker replaces Bjorn Rebney at Bellator	Scott Coker replaces Bjorn Rebney at Bellator		CM Punk signs with UFC
2015	The fall of Ronda Rousey & the rise of Conor McGregor	Ronda Rousey's shock loss to Holly Holm	UFC brings in UDADA		
2016	UFC selling for $4.2billion WWE expands to the United Kingdom	UFC selling for $4.2billion	UFC selling for $4.2billion		AJ Styles comes to WWE

Worst of Awards
Worst Male Wrestler

Year	Dan Lovranski	Jason Agnew	John Pollock	Wai Ting
2008	Vladimir Kozlov	Vladimir Kozlov	Braden Walker	
2009	The Great Khali	Hornswoggle	The Great Khali	
2010	David Otunga	Rhino	David Otunga	
2011	Crimson	Rob Van Dam	Crimson	
2012	Tensai	The Great Khali	The Miz	The Great Khali
2013	Erick Rowan	The Miz	Wes Brisco	The Miz
2014	Erick Rowan	Kane	Manabu Nakanishi	
2015	Braun Strowman	Mahabali Shera	Mojo Rawley	

Worst Female Wrestler

Year	Dan Lovranski	Jason Agnew	John Pollock	Wai Ting
2008	Rhaka Khan; Christy Hemme (honorable mention); Michelle McCool (honorable mention)	Christy Hemme; Michelle McCool	Rhaka Khan	
2009	Lacey Von Erich	Michelle McCool	Jenna Morasca	
2010	Kelly Kelly	Alicia Fox	Lacey Von Erich	
2011	Kelly Kelly	Alicia Fox	Kelly Kelly	
2012	Aksana	Velvet Sky	Taeler Hendrix	Aksana
2013	Eva Marie	Eva Marie	Eva Marie	Eva Marie
2014	Alicia Fox	-	Aksana	
2015	Eva Marie	Velvet Sky	Eva Marie	

Worst Tag Team

Year	Dan Lovranski	Jason Agnew	John Pollock	Wai Ting
2008	Curt Hawkins and Zack Ryder	Abyss and Matt Morgan	Curt Hawkins and Zack Ryder	
2009	Mark Henry and Montel Vontavious Porter	D-Generation X (Triple H and Shawn Michaels)	D-Generation X (Triple H and Shawn Michaels)	
2010	Eric Young and Orlando Jordan	Eric Young and Orlando Jordan	Gunner and Murphy	
2011	Matt Morgan and Crimson	David Otunga and Michael McGillicutty	Mexican America (Hernandez and Anarquia); Triple H and CM Punk (honorable mention)	
2012	Matt Morgan and Crimson	Eric Young and ODB	The Guardians of Truth	Matt Morgan and Crimson
2013	Ryback and Curtis Axel	The Ascension	Garett Bischoff and Wes Brisco	The Great Khali & Santino Marella
2014	The Ascension	The Ascension	Rolles Gracie Jr. and Daniel Gracie	
2015	The Ascension	The Meta Powers (Curtis Axel & Damien Sandow)	The Ascension	

Worst on the Mic

Year	Dan Lovranski	Jason Agnew	John Pollock	Wai Ting
2008	Vladimir Kozlov	Mike Adamle	Mike Adamle	
2009	Tiffany	Tiffany; Rhino (honorable mention)	Tiffany	
2010	Kane	Rhino	Dixie Carter	
2011	D'Angelo Dinero	John Laurinaitis	Mr. Anderson	
2012	Claire Lynch	Mr. Anderson	The Miz	The Miz
2013	John Cena	The Miz; Mr. Anderson (tie)	Curtis Axel	The Great Khali
2014	Roman Reigns	Roman Reigns	Brie Bella	
2015	The Ascension	Roman Reigns	Sheamus	

Worst Announcer

Year	Dan Lovranski	Jason Agnew	John Pollock	Wai Ting
2008	Mike Adamle	Mike Adamle; Scott Ferrall	Mike Adamle	
2009	Michael Cole	Michael Cole	Todd Grisham	
2010	Taz	Taz	Matt Striker	
2011	Taz	Michael Cole; Jerry Lawler; Booker T	Booker T	
2012	Taz	Taz	Taz	Taz
2013	Taz	Taz	Taz	Taz
2014	Mike Tenay; Taz	Michael Cole; Jerry Lawler; John Bradshaw Layfield	Michael Cole; Jerry Lawler; John Bradshaw Layfield	
2015	John Bradshaw Layfield	"The Pope" D'Angelo Dinero	"The Pope" D'Angelo Dinero	

Worst Non-Wrestling Performer

Year	Dan Lovranski	Jason Agnew	John Pollock	Wai Ting
2008	Mike Adamle	Mike Adamle	Mike Adamle	
2009	Tiffany	Tiffany	Tiffany	
2010	Dixie Carter	Hornswoggle	Bubba the Love Sponge	
2011	Dixie Carter	Aksana	Michael Cole	
2012	Claire Lynch	Claire Lynch	Claire Lynch	Claire Lynch
2013	Hulk Hogan	Booker T Teddy Long	Dixie Carter	Dixie Carter
2014	Dixie Carter	Truth Martini	Dixie Carter	
2015	Summer Rae	Dixie Carter	Lana	

Worst Raw Guest Host
This award was only awarded in 2009 due to the use of guest hosts on WWE Raw.

Year	Dan Lovranski	Jason Agnew	John Pollock
2009	ZZ Top; Dennis Miller(honorable mention); Verne Troyer (honorable mention); Ozzy Osbourne and Sharon Osbourne (honorable mention)	Ozzy Osbourne and Sharon Osbourne	Dennis Miller

Most Underutilized Performer
This award is given to the most underrated wrestler of the year, or the ones whose efforts largely went unrewarded. This award was not given in 2011 due to an omission in the list of awards for that year.

Year	Dan Lovranski	Jason Agnew	John Pollock
2008	Montel Vontavious Porter	Matt Morgan	Natalya
2009	Montel Vontavious Porter	Jack Swagger	The Motor City Machine Guns; Tyson Kidd (honorable mention)
2010	Montel Vontavious Porter; Jack Swagger (honorable mention)	Jay Lethal	Daniel Bryan

They Really Dropped the Ball On...
This award is given to the wrestling or mixed martial arts event that failed in its execution or led to missed opportunities.

Year	Dan Lovranski	Jason Agnew	John Pollock	Wai Ting
2008	CM Punk after losing the World Heavyweight Championship	Montel Vontavious Porter after losing the WWE United States Championship	CM Punk after losing the World Heavyweight Championship	
2009	Jack Swagger after being traded to Raw	Gail Kim's tenure in WWE; End of CM Punk's World Heavyweight Championship reign	Kofi Kingston's sustained push	
2010	Samoa Joe's overall character The Hart Dynasty following the return of Bret Hart	The return of the Monday Night War between WWE Raw and TNA Impact; The Hart Dynasty following the return of Bret Hart; Hulk Hogan and Eric Bischoff attempting to overhaul TNA	Bret Hart vs. Vince McMahon WrestleMania XXVII buildup and match Team WWE defeating Nexus at SummerSlam	
2011	Sin Cara's introduction	Return of CM Punk; Christian's reign as World Heavyweight Champion (honorable mention); Alberto Del Rio's overall character (honorable mention)	Return of Mick Foley	
2012	Brock Lesnar	Brock Lesnar	James Storm	Strikeforce
2013	Daniel Bryan	Chris Masters	Tyson Kidd	Daniel Bryan
2014	WWE Network	Cesaro	Dean Ambrose	
2015	Daniel Bryan at the Royal Rumble; Sting (honorable mention)	WWE Woman's Division	No Top Heel after Seth Rollins injury (#1 of Top Ten List)	

Worst Gimmick
First awarded in 2008, after the last minute inclusion of the Best Gimmick award the previous week.

Year	Dan Lovranski	Jason Agnew	John Pollock	Wai Ting
2008	Fish Market Street Fight (Team 3D vs. Curry Man and Shark Boy, Destination X)	Super Eric and the Prince Justice Brotherhood	Ricky Ortiz	
2009	Raw guest hosts	The Abraham Washington Show	The Governor; D-Generation X	
2010	Orlando Jordan as the bisexual character Anonymous General Manager of Raw	Orlando Jordan as the bisexual character	Anonymous General Manager of Raw	
2011	Eric Young challenging TV stars as TNA Television Champion	Michael Cole as heel lead announcer Sting's Joker-inspired character	Bound for Glory Series Tournament	
2012	Aces & Eights	Jeff Hardy internal monologues TNA Gut Check	3 Hour Raw	Natalya farting
2013	Bad News Barrett	Aces & Eights	"The Lone Wolf" AJ Styles	Antonio Cesaro yodeling
2014	Samuel Shaw	$9.99 marketing idea for WWE Network	$9.99 marketing idea for WWE Network	
2015	MexAmerica (Alberto Del Rio & Zeb Coulter); The Revolution(honorable mention)	The Revolution	The Revolution	

Worst Match of the Year
In 2009, this category was named in honour of the Jenna Morasca vs. Sharmell match that was unanimously named the worst that year.

Year	Dan Lovranski	Jason Agnew	John Pollock	Wai Ting
2008	Frank Trigg vs. A.J. Styles (TNA No Surrender (2008))	Michelle McCool vs. Maryse (WWE SmackDown); John Cena vs. John Bradshaw Layfield Parking Lot Brawl (The Great American Bash)	Frank Trigg vs. A.J. Styles (TNA No Surrender)	
2009	Jenna Morasca vs. Sharmell (TNA Victory Road)	Jenna Morasca vs. Sharmell (TNA Victory Road)	Jenna Morasca vs. Sharmell (TNA Victory Road)	
2010	Bret Hart vs. Vince McMahon (WrestleMania XXVII); Kaitlyn vs. Maxine (NXT) (honorable mention)	Bret Hart vs. Vince McMahon (WrestleMania XXVII)	Kaitlyn vs. Maxine (NXT)	
2011	John Cena vs. The Miz (WWE Over the Limit)	Matt Morgan vs. Crimson (TNA Turning Point)	Sting vs. Jeff Hardy (TNA Victory Road); Alicia Fox vs. Beth Phoenix (WWE SmackDown)	
2012	John Cena vs. John Laurinaitis (WWE Over the Limit)	John Cena vs. Michael Cole (Raw 6/4/12)	Kris Lewie vs. Gunner (TNA Impact 9/23/12)	Kris Lewie vs. Gunner (TNA Impact 9/23/12)
2013	Randy Orton vs. Daniel Bryan (WWE Battleground)	Ryan Howe vs. Adam Ohriner (TNA Gut Check)	Randy Orton vs. Big Show (WWE Survivor Series)	The Great Khali & Natalya vs. Big E. Langston & AJ Lee (Raw 9/12/13)
2014	Big Show vs. Erick Rowan Stairs Match (WWE TLC)	Layla vs. Summer Rae (WWE Money in the Bank)	Kazushi Sakuraba & Yuji Nagata vs. Rolles Gracie Jr. & Daniel Gracie (Wrestle Kingdom 8)	
2015	Los Villanos vs. Los Psycho Circus (Triplemanía XXIII)	Los Villanos vs. Los Psycho Circus (Triplemanía XXIII)	Los Villanos vs. Los Psycho Circus (Triplemanía XXIII)	

Worst Feud of the Year

Year	Dan Lovranski	Jason Agnew	John Pollock	Wai Ting
2008	Eric Young vs. Robert Roode (TNA Beer Drinking Championship)	Black Machismo vs. Sonjay Dutt	Black Machismo vs. Sonjay Dutt	
2009	D-Generation X vs. Hornswoggle	Chavo Guerrero Jr. vs. Hornswoggle	Randy Orton vs. Shane McMahon; Chavo Guerrero Jr. vs. Hornswoggle (honorable mention)	
2010	Edge vs. Kane	Edge vs. Kane	Edge vs. Kane	
2011	Michael Cole vs. Jerry Lawler	Michael Cole vs. Jerry Lawler	Michael Cole vs. Jim Ross; Samoa Joe vs. D'Angelo Dinero (honorable mention); Angelina Love vs. Winter (honorable mention)	
2012	John Cena vs. John Laurinaitis	Aces & Eights vs. TNA	Aces & Eights vs. TNA	Aces & Eights vs. TNA
2013	TNA vs. Aces & Eights	Quinton Jackson vs. Tito Ortiz	Big Show vs. Triple H	The Miz vs. Kofi Kingston
2014	Samuel Shaw vs. Mr. Anderson	Nikki Bella vs. Brie Bella	Nikki Bella vs. Brie Bella	
2015	Mickie James vs. James Storm; Team PCB vs. Team B.A.D. vs. Team Bella (honorable mention); Dolph Ziggler & Lana vs.Rusev & Summer Rae (honorable mention)	Dolph Ziggler vs. Rusev	Dolph Ziggler vs. Rusev	

Worst Angle

Year	Dan Lovranski	Jason Agnew	John Pollock	Wai Ting
2008	Team 3D forced to make weight against X-Division opponents	Conclusion of Vince McMahon million-dollar giveaway contest	Exploitation of Jill Jarrett (Jeff Jarrett's deceased wife) to get heat on Kurt Angle	
2009	Hornswoggle's antics in general	Hornswoggle joining D-Generation X	Shawn Michaels resurfaces as a fast-order cook	
2010	Formation of EV 2.0	Formation of EV 2.0	Formation of Immortal	
2011	Jersey Shore cast making cameo appearances on Impact Wrestling	Sin Cara vs. Sin Cara	Triple H as the COO	
2012	Fake Heart Attack with CM Punk & Paul Heyman on Raw	Claire Lynch	Claire Lynch	Claire Lynch
2013	Big Show losing all his money	AJ Styles leaving TNA	Big Show & Triple H lawsuit settlement	Xavier Woods stealing the music of Brodus Clay
2014	James Storm as The Revolution leader	Samuel Shaw stalking Christy Hemme	Samuel Shaw stalking Christy Hemme	
2015	Stephanie McMahon introduces the "Woman's Revolution"	James Storm pushes Mickie James on train tracks	Paige's Reid Flair promo James Storm pushes Mickie James on train tracks (honorable mention)	

Worst Pay-Per-View
Up until 2009, there was a single award covering both wrestling and mixed martial arts pay-per-view events. In 2009, this category was split to two separate awards for wrestling events and mixed martial arts events, and in 2011 the mixed martial arts event category was no longer restricted to pay-per-view events, instead focusing on supercards in general.

Worst Wrestling Pay-Per-View

Year	Dan Lovranski	Jason Agnew	John Pollock	Wai Ting
2008	Final Resolution (both January and December)	Final Resolution (December)	—N/a	
2009	Destination X	WWE Breaking Point	TNA Victory Road	
2010	TNA Hardcore Justice	TNA Hardcore Justice	TNA Hardcore Justice	
2011	TNA Victory Road	TNA Victory Road	TNA Victory Road	
2012	TNA Lockdown	TNA Lockdown	TNA Lockdown	—N/a
2013	WWE Battleground	WWE Battleground	WWE Battleground	—N/a
2014	WWE TLC	-	TNA Bound for Glory	
2015	Triplemanía XXIII	Triplemanía XXIII	Triplemanía XXIII	

Worst Mixed Martial Arts Supercard
Dan Lovranski's pick for 2010 was not revealed on the Worst of 2010; it was claimed as the 2010 pick on the Worst of 2011 show.

Year	Dan Lovranski	Jason Agnew	John Pollock	Wai Ting
2008	—N/a	—N/a	YAMMA Pit Fighting	
2009	—N/a	—N/a	—N/a	
2010	UFC 112	Impact FC 2	UFC 112	
2011	UFC 130	UFC 130; UFC 119	Strikeforce: Melendez vs. Masvidal	
2012	UFC 149	UFC 149	UFC 149	UFC 149
2013	UFC 161	UFC 161	UFC 161	UFC 161
2014	UFC 177	UFC 177	UFC 174	
2015	—N/a	UFC 186	UFC 186	

Worst Promotion

Year	Dan Lovranski	Jason Agnew	John Pollock	Wai Ting
2008	Total Nonstop Action Wrestling	Total Nonstop Action Wrestling	Total Nonstop Action Wrestling	
2009	Total Nonstop Action Wrestling	Total Nonstop Action Wrestling	Total Nonstop Action Wrestling	
2010	Total Nonstop Action Wrestling	Total Nonstop Action Wrestling	Total Nonstop Action Wrestling	
2011	Total Nonstop Action Wrestling	Strikeforce	Total Nonstop Action Wrestling	
2012	Total Nonstop Action Wrestling	Strikeforce	Strikeforce	Strikeforce
2013	Total Nonstop Action Wrestling	Bellator	Total Nonstop Action Wrestling	Total Nonstop Action Wrestling
2014	UFC	Total Nonstop Action Wrestling	Total Nonstop Action Wrestling	
2015	Total Nonstop Action Wrestling	Total Nonstop Action Wrestling	Total Nonstop Action Wrestling	

Worst TV Show

Year	Dan Lovranski	Jason Agnew	John Pollock	Wai Ting
2008	Asistencia Asesoría y Administración	TNA Impact	TNA Impact	
2009	TNA Impact	WWE Superstars	TNA Impact	
2010	NXT (all seasons)	NXT season 3	TNA Impact	
2011	Impact Wrestling	NXT Redemption	Impact Wrestling	
2012	WWE Raw	WWE Smackdown	The Ultimate Fighter Live	WWE Raw
2013	WWE Smackdown	Ring of Honor	WWE Raw	WWE Raw
2014	TNA Top 20 Moments on Spike TV	WWE Smackdown	WWE Raw	
2015	Impact Wrestling	Impact Wrestling	Impact Wrestling	

Worst Book
Like its Best of counterpart, Jason Agnew does not usually give a pick due to his commitments with other shows precluding him from reading too many wrestling or mixed martial arts books; though he formally did not have a pick for 2010, he did make a joke pick for 2010, however.

Year	Dan Lovranski	Jason Agnew	John Pollock	Wai Ting
2008	Ring of Hell by Matthew Randozzo V	—N/a	Made in America by Matt Hughes	
2009	My Life Outside the Ring by Hulk Hogan	—N/a	My Life Outside the Ring by Hulk Hogan	
2010	Cross Rhodes by Dustin Rhodes	"The book that Dixie Carter gave to Eric Bischoff and Hulk Hogan"	How WCW Killed Vince Russo by Vince Russo	
2011	Death Clutch by Brock Lesnar and Paul Heyman	—N/a	Wrestling the Hulk: My Life on the Ropes by Linda Hogan	
2012	"The King of New Orleans' by Greg Klein	—N/a	"Physical Chess" by Billy Robinson	—N/a
2013	"50 Greatest Professional Wrestlers" by Larry Matysik	—N/a	"Hart Strings" by Julie Hart	—N/a
2014	—N/a	—N/a	—N/a	
2015	—N/a	—N/a	—N/a	

Worst DVD/Original Programming

Year	Dan Lovranski	Jason Agnew	John Pollock	Wai Ting
2008	The Definitive Ric Flair Collection	The Twisted, Disturbed Life of Kane	Kurt Angle Champion	
2009	Randy Savage Macho Madness	The Best of Smackdown	Batista I Walk Alone	
2010	Bobby Heenan	The Top 50 WWE Superstars of All Time	Knucklehead	
2011	WWE Greatest Superstars of the 21st Century	WWE Greatest Superstars of the 21st Century	The Big Show A Giant's World	
2012	"WWE One in a Lifetime: The Rock vs. John Cena	Brock Lesnar: Here Comes The Pain (re-issue)	Vince Russo YouShoot Live	Queen of the Ring starring Chyna
2013	Triple H: Thy Kingdom Come	Goldberg: The Ultimate Collection	Triple H: Thy Kingdom Come	—N/a
2014	—N/a	—N/a	—N/a	
2015	WWE Swerved	Total Divas	WWE Monday Night War	

Worst Fighter

Year	Dan Lovranski	Jason Agnew	John Pollock	Wai Ting
2008	Kimbo Slice	Kimbo Slice	Ken Shamrock	
2009	Kimbo Slice	Kimbo Slice	Houston Alexander	
2010	Kimbo Slice	Gilbert Yvel	James Toney	
2011	Mirko Filipović	Jake Shields	Valentijn Overeem	
2012	Quinton Jackson	Jason "Mayhem" Miller	Bob Sapp	Jason "Mayhem" Miller
2013	Chris Leben	Uriah Hall	Alistair Overeem	Uriah Hall
2014	Nate Diaz	Chael Sonnen	Cris "Cyborg" Santos	
2015	José Aldo	José Aldo	Anderson Silva	

Worst Fight of the Year

Year	Dan Lovranski	Jason Agnew	John Pollock	Wai Ting
2008	Kimbo Slice vs. James Thompson (EliteXC: Primetime)	Nate Quarry vs. Kalib Starnes (UFC 83)	Kimbo Slice vs. Seth Petruzelli (EliteXC: Heat); Nate Quarry vs. Kalib Starnes (UFC 83) (honorable mention)	
2009	Kimbo Slice vs. Houston Alexander (The Ultimate Fighter: Heavyweights Finale)	Anderson Silva vs. Thales Leites (UFC 97)	Anderson Silva vs. Thales Leites (UFC 97)	
2010	Anderson Silva vs. Demian Maia (UFC 112)	Frank Mir vs. Mirko Filipović (UFC 119)	Randy Couture vs. James Toney (UFC 118)	
2011	Frank Mir vs. Roy Nelson (UFC 130)	Alistair Overeem vs. Fabrício Werdum (Strikeforce: Overeem vs. Werdum)	Bobby Lashley vs. John Ott (Titan Fighting Championships 17)	
2012	Gray Maynard vs. Clay Guida (UFC on FX 4)	Gray Maynard vs. Clay Guida (UFC on FX 4)	Cheick Kongo vs. Shawn Jordan (UFC 149)	Cheick Kongo vs. Shawn Jordan (UFC 149)
2013	Uriah Hall vs. Chris Leben (UFC 168)	Rory MacDonald vs. Jake Ellenberger (UFC on FOX 8)	Soa Palelei vs. Nikita Krylov (UFC 164)	Antônio Rogério Nogueira vs. Rashad Evans (UFC 156)
2014	Andrei Arlovski vs. Brendan Schaub (UFC 174)	-	Tito Ortiz vs. Stephan Bonnar (Bellator 131)	
2015	Gabriel Gonzaga vs. Konstanin Erokhin (The Ultimate Fighter 22)	—N/a	Patrick Walsh vs. Dan Kelly (UFC Fight Night 60)	

WTF Moment of the Year
This award is given to the moment in the past year that makes a viewer ashamed of being a wrestling or mixed martial arts fan, or the moment that evoked the strongest namesake reaction.

Year	Dan Lovranski	Jason Agnew	John Pollock	Wai Ting
2008	General booking of Total Nonstop Action Wrestling; Ken Shamrock, Kimbo Slice, and Seth Petruzelli debacle leading to collapse of EliteXC (honourable mention)	Ken Shamrock, Kimbo Slice, and Seth Petruzelli debacle leading to collapse of EliteXC	Ken Shamrock, Kimbo Slice, and Seth Petruzelli debacle leading to collapse of EliteXC	
2009	Total Nonstop Action Wrestling allying with Hulk Hogan and Eric Bischoff; Shane McMahon's departure from World Wrestling Entertainment (honourable mention); Anticipation of Bret Hart's return (honourable mention)	Fallout of Donald Trump "buying" WWE Raw	Cute Kip being a replacement for Kevin Nash at TNA Genesis	
2010	The Big Show removing CM Punk's mask	Judging inconsistencies in UFC; Hulk Hogan posting a video of himself defecating on Twitter	Homicide's unprotected chairshot to Rob Terry	
2011	Robert Roode loses at TNA Bound for Glory	Crowd reaction to Hulk Hogan vs. Sting at TNA Bound for Glory	CM Punk teams up with Triple H	
2012	John Cena beats Brock Lesnar at Extreme Rules	Hulk Hogan Sex Tape	John Cena beats Brock Lesnar at Extreme Rules	UFC injuries and cancellations
2013	Seattle crowd chanting Daniel Bryan during unification ceremony on Raw	Dixie Carter grabs Hulk Hogan's leg and begs him to stay	All iPPV screw ups	Anderson Silva breaks leg
2014	Dean Ambrose hologram/exploding TV finishes	TNA relationship with Vince Russo all year long	TNA relationship with Vince Russo all year long	
2015	Daniel Bryan losing the Royal Rumble; Conor McGregor beating José Aldo in 13 seconds	Hulk Hogan racist rant & handling of it Anderson Silva's mysterious blue sexual enhancement liquid (honorable mention)	Hulk Hogan racist rant & handling of it The entire booking of the 2015 Royal Rumble Match (honorable mention)	

=== Spinoff Series Awards ===
Additional Best & Worst of picks may also be given by other members of the LAW's associated podcasts, picks from these restricted in scope to the wrestling, but are otherwise identical in scope. As of January 2017 other LAW associated hosts include; Wai Ting; Braden Herrington; Brain Mann; Nate Milton; Chris Charlton; WH Park; "Bartender" Dave; Martin Bushby; & Oli Court.

whtsNXT: Best & Worst of Awards
- Best Wrestler: Male

Year	Jason Agnew	Braden Herrington	"Bartender" Dave
2015	Kevin Owens	Finn Bálor	
2016	Samoa Joe	Shinsuke Nakamura	Samoa Joe

- Best Wrestler: Female

Year	Jason Agnew	Braden Herrington	"Bartender" Dave
2015	Bayley	Sasha Banks	
2016	Auska	Auska	Auska

- Best Tag Team

Year	Jason Agnew	Braden Herrington	"Bartender" Dave
2015	Enzo & Cass	Jason Jordan & Chad Gable	
2016	The Revival	The Revival	The Revival

- Best Match of the Year

Year	Jason Agnew	Braden Herrington	"Bartender" Dave
2015	Sasha Banks vs. Bayley (Takeover: Brooklyn)	Sasha Banks vs. Bayley (Takeover: Brooklyn)	
2016	DIY vs. The Revival (Takeover: Toronto)	Shinsuke Nakamura vs. Sami Zayn (Takeover: Dallas)	DIY vs. The Revival (Takeover: Toronto)

- Best on the Mic

Year	Jason Agnew	Braden Herrington	"Bartender" Dave
2015	Enzo	Corey Graves	
2016	The Revival	The Revival	The Revival

- Best Takeover Event

Year	Jason Agnew	Braden Herrington	"Bartender" Dave
2015	Takeover: Brooklyn	Takeover: Brooklyn	
2016	Takeover: Toronto	Takeover: Toronto	Takeover: Dallas

- Should debut on the Raw-After-Mania

This award was only awarded in 2015.

Year	Jason Agnew	Braden Herrington	"Bartender" Dave
2015	Finn Bálor	Finn Bálor	

- Best Transition to Main Roster

This award is given to the call-up from NXT who transitions Best to the Main Roster (Raw/SmackDown). It was first awarded in 2016.

Year	Jason Agnew	Braden Herrington	"Bartender" Dave
2016	Alexa Bliss	Alexa Bliss	Corey Graves

- Worst Wrestler: Male

Year	Jason Agnew	Braden Herrington	"Bartender" Dave
2015	Mojo Rawley	Baron Corbin	
2016	Andrade "Cien" Almas	"The Drifter" Elias Samson (h/m Patrick Clark)	Angelo Dawkins

- Worst Wrestler: Female

Year	Jason Agnew	Braden Herrington	"Bartender" Dave
2015	Nia Jax	Carmella	
2016	Liv Morgan	Liv Morgan	Nia Jax

- Worst Tag Team

Year	Jason Agnew	Braden Herrington	"Bartender" Dave
2015	Hype Bros	The Vaudevillains	
2016	The Authors of Pain	The Authors of Pain	Blake & Murphy

- Worst Match of the Year

'In 2015 Braden awarded every match involving Baron Corbon "Worst Match of the Year", felling every match was equally terrible.

Year	Jason Agnew	Braden Herrington	"Bartender" Dave
2015	Baron Corbin vs. Bull Dempsey (Takeover: Rival)	Baron Corbon vs. "Anyone" (NXT)	
2016	Aliyah vs. Liv Morgan (NXT)	Aliyah vs. Liv Morgan (NXT)	Buddy Murphy vs. Wesley Blake (NXT)

- Worst on the Mic

Year	Jason Agnew	Braden Herrington	"Bartender" Dave
2015	Mojo Rawley (h/m Apollo Crews)	Baron Corbin	
2016	Nia Jax (h/m Carmella)	Paul Ellering	Nia Jax

- Worst Takeover Event

In 2015 both Jason & Braden felt there was no "Worst Takeover Event" of 2015.

Year	Jason Agnew	Braden Herrington	"Bartender" Dave
2015	—N/a	—N/a	
2016	Takeover: The End	Takeover: The End	Takeover: Brooklyn

- Should be released

This award was only awarded in 2015.

Year	Jason Agnew	Braden Herrington	"Bartender" Dave
2015	Mojo Rawley	Baron Corbin & Bull Dempsey	

- Worst Transition to Main Roster

This award is given to the call-up from NXT who transitions Worst to the Main Roster (Raw/SmackDown). It was first awarded in 2016.

Year	Jason Agnew	Braden Herrington	"Bartender" Dave
2016	Apollo Crews	The Vaudevillains	The Vaudevillains
