= CounterSpin (TV program) =

Canadian TV series

- Created by: Paul Jay; Ron Haggart
- Presented by: Avi Lewis; Sharon Lewis; Carol Off
- Country of origin: Canada

Production
- Executive producer: Paul Jay

Original release
- Network: CBC Newsworld
- Release: 1998 – 2004

CounterSpin (counterspin.tv) is a Canadian television program which was broadcast on CBC Newsworld from 1998 to 2004.

A daily panel debate show, CounterSpin guests would debate issues in front of a studio audience. The show also included news reports which tried to examine the day's issue in more depth than a typical newscast.

The show was an independent production created by executive producer Paul Jay also a documentary filmmaker (Wrestling with Shadows, Return to Kandahar). Jay went on to become the founding chair of The Real News Network. Co-creator was veteran CBC producer Ron Haggart.

The show's host for the first three seasons was Avi Lewis. He then left the show to concentrate on other projects, and was replaced by Sharon Lewis (no relation) for one season. Sharon Lewis then went to the CBC's main network to host ZeD, and was replaced by Carol Off.

In 2004 the CBC announced that the series would not be renewed for the fall television season, and instead a new program would be developed for its time slot. The new program, CBC News: The Hour, began on January 17, 2005, with George Stroumboulopoulos as its anchor.
