= CounterSpin =

CounterSpin may refer to:

- CounterSpin (TV series), a Canadian TV program 1998–2004
- CounterSpin, an American weekly radio program produced by Fairness & Accuracy in Reporting
- Counterspin Media, a far-right, anti-vaccine, and conspiracy theorist New Zealand online media platform
