= Mad Dogs, Midgets and Screw Jobs =

2013 book about professional wrestling in Montreal

- First edition
- Author: Pat Laprade, Bertrand Hébert
- Language: English
- Subject: Wrestling
- Genre: History
- Publisher: ECW Press
- Publication date: 2013
- Publication place: Canada
- Media type: Print
- Pages: 460
- Awards: The Wrestling Observer Newsletter awards: Best Pro Wrestling Book, 2013
- ISBN: 9781770410947

Mad Dogs, Midgets and Screw Jobs: The Untold Story of How Montreal Shaped the World of Wrestling is a 2013 book about professional wrestling in Montreal, it was written by Pat Laprade and Bertrand Hébert. It won the Wrestling Observer Newsletter award for Best Pro Wrestling Book and was named the best wrestling book of the year by The Law.
