= Paul Jay =

Canadian journalist and filmmaker

- Born: 7 August 1951 (age 75); Toronto, Ontario, Canada
- Citizenship: Canada; United States
- Occupations: Journalist; Filmmaker
- Years active: 1997–present
- Known for: Co-founder of The Real News Network; Co-founder of theAnalysis.news
- Relatives: Ted Allan (uncle)
- Awards: Gemini Award
- Website: theanalysis.news

Paul Jay (born 1951) is a Canadian journalist and documentary filmmaker. He is the founder, editor-in-chief, and host of theAnalysis.news, a video and audio current affairs interview and commentary website. His films have won numerous awards at major international festivals.

He was the founder, CEO and senior editor of The Real News Network (TRNN). A past chair of the Canadian Independent Film Caucus (now called DOC), the main organization of documentary filmmakers in Canada, Jay is the founding chair of the Hot Docs Canadian International Documentary Festival. He chaired the Hot Docs! board for its first five years.

== Early life ==
Jay was born and raised in Toronto, Ontario and holds dual-citizenship with the United States. Jay is the nephew of screenwriter Ted Allan.

Jay dropped out of high school at sixteen years of age and never received any formal training in filmmaking. He became interested in the subject after attending an experimental free school, where he had the opportunity to create a short film. He gained experience by directing sports documentaries for CBC and TSN..

== Film and television work ==
Jay’s early documentary work includes The Birth of Language (TVOntario, Discovery US, 1986), a film exploring human evolution and the origins of language, featuring anthropologists Jane Goodall and Sherwood Washburn, which received wide critical acclaim including a review in the Globe and Mail.

Never-Endum Referendum (CTV, SRC, Arte, 1997), is a feature-length documentary, on the 1995 Quebec referendum over the question of seceding from Canada. It was called "a moving, masterful piece of film-making about a tough subject" by Tony Atherton of the Ottawa Citizen.

Jay's Hitman Hart: Wrestling with Shadows (1998), a feature-length documentary about pro wrestler Bret Hart, was screened in 25 major festivals and won more than a dozen awards. It has been called "one of the most acclaimed Canadian films in years" by eye magazine, "A tale as bizarre as Kafka and as tragic as Shakespeare" (Ottawa Citizen) and "one of the best films of 1998" (Peter Plagens, art critic for Newsweek). Hitman was produced in cooperation with the National Film Board of Canada, TVOntario, The 'A' Channel, CTV, A&E, BBC's Storyville series, and La Sept/Arte. Jay also appeared in interview segments in another Bret Hart documentary which came out in 2010, Bret Hart: Survival of the Hitman.

Lost in Las Vegas (2001) is a feature-length documentary for A&E. "Equal parts hilarious, heroic and heartfelt... often surprising, occasionally inspiring, frequently hilarious... You've got to see this thing to believe it. It's so good", wrote Rob Salem of The Toronto Star.

Return to Kandahar (2003), a feature-length documentary, was co-directed with Nelofer Pazira, star of the movie Kandahar (2001). Although Kandahar was fictional, Return to Kandahar follows Pazira's return to Afghanistan in search of her childhood friend; her first attempt inspired the fictional movie. RTK won the Donald Brittain Gemini award for best social political documentary.

Jay was the creator and executive producer of CBC Newsworld's flagship debate program counterSpin (broadcast from 1998 to 2004) for six seasons. CounterSpin was a prime time debate show about the news of the day.

Other work includes Justice Denied (Turner), The Life and Death of Owen Hart (TVO, A&E), Albanian Journey: End of an Era (TVOntario, CBC Witness), Here's to the Cowboy (CBC, Disney, London Weekend, Central TV). Jay exec-produced Through Thick and Thin (CBCNewsworld), Machine Gun (3x1 Discovery Canada&US), and The Famine Within (TVO). Jay was the co-creator and co-executive producer of Face Off, a nightly prime time debate program that ran four years on CBC Newsworld.

He worked with Gore Vidal, among others, for the launch of TRNN, which included the documentary: History of the National Security State. In this, Jay interviewed Vidal, as well as Lawrence Wilkerson, Ray McGovern, and Antonia Juhasz. The Real News went on to launch several internet video/television news magazines, including The Empire Files, created in 2015 with teleSUR and for which Jay was an executive producer. Jay was the executive producer of the 2017 Donald Trump, The Koch Brothers and Their War on Climate Science documentary.

Jay parted ways with TRNN in 2019 and founded of theAnalysis.news, a video and audio current affairs interview and commentary show and website.

Jay is currently in post-production on How to Stop a Nuclear War, a feature documentary examining the structural roots of nuclear risk in American militarism. The film draws on 45 hours of exclusive interviews with Pentagon Papers whistleblower Daniel Ellsberg, conducted before Ellsberg’s death in 2023, as well as interviews with more than 100 experts including historians, former military and intelligence officials, and scientists. The film is narrated by Emma Thompson with an original score by Mychael Danna. Canadian distribution is through Mongrel Media, with theatrical release targeted for fall 2027.
