= Sisterhood of the Squared Circle =

2017 professional wrestling book

Sisterhood of the Squared Circle: The History and Rise of Women's Wrestling
- First edition
- Author: Pat Laprade and Dan Murphy
- Language: English
- Subject: Wrestling
- Genre: History
- Publisher: ECW Press
- Publication place: Canada

Sisterhood of the Squared Circle: The History and Rise of Women's Wrestling is a 2017 book about the history of women's professional wrestling. The book was written by wrestling historians Pat Laprade and Dan Murphy.
