= John Pollock (journalist) =

Canadian journalist

John Pollock is a Canadian sports reporter best known for his work on Fight Network Radio, Live Audio Wrestling and founding the website POST Wrestling. He has also produced the acclaimed documentary Bret Hart: Survival of the Hitman about professional wrestler Bret Hart.

== Early life ==
Pollock was born in Toronto.

== Career ==
Pollock began his career as a professional wrestling and combat sports reporter with the Fight Network for their radio show The LAW with co-host Wai-Ting. After the show was cancelled in 2017, due to financial issues from the parent company Anthem, the two of them created their own website POSTWrestling where they report on news and feature podcasts.

Pollock also produced the 2010 documentary film Bret Hart: Survival of the Hitman which is about Canadian professional wrestler Bret Hart who is Pollock's favorite wrestler, the film is about Hart's return to the wrestling industry after 10 years of isolation. In 2019 he also produced and starred in the audio documentary Owen Hart's Final Day.

== Personal life ==
Pollock is friendly with former wrestling referee Jimmy Korderas and helped him get work on The Fight Network.
