= Bret "Hit Man" Hart: The Best There Is, the Best There Was, the Best There Ever Will Be =

- Cover of the DVD
- Directed by: Kevin Dunn
- Starring: Bret Hart; Roddy Piper; Chris Benoit; Mick Foley
- Production company: WWE
- Distributed by: WWE Home Video
- Release date: November 15, 2005
- Running time: 549 minutes
- Language: English

Bret "Hit Man" Hart: The Best There Is, The Best There Was, The Best There Ever Will Be also known as The Bret Hart Story: The Best There Is, The Best There Was, The Best There Ever Will Be is a 2005 documentary film released by WWE Home Video as part of a three-DVD set on November 15, 2005, by World Wrestling Entertainment (WWE). The documentary chronicles the career of popular WWE wrestler Bret Hart. Hart collaborated with WWE to make the documentary, contributing hours of interview content to the film. This collaboration marked the first time Hart had worked in an on camera capacity with WWE since the Montreal Screwjob, which was Hart's last in-ring appearance with the company until his return on January 4, 2010. The documentary chronicles Bret Hart's wrestling career, from how he broke into the business as a member of the Hart family to his run in World Championship Wrestling (WCW).

This is the second documentary about Bret Hart, the first being Hitman Hart: Wrestling with Shadows (which was produced with cooperation by the WWF, but not released by WWF/E Home Video) which chronicles Hart's last days wrestling in the WWF and talks about his relationship with his brother Owen.

== History ==
Hart has stated that the video was a project that he had wanted to do for a long time and that he originally pitched the idea of a compilation set to Vince McMahon before DVDs were commonplace.

=== Initial idea ===
Originally, the DVD was to be named Screwed: The Bret Hart Story, and would be a film focusing on the negative aspects of Hart's career, much like WWE's The Ultimate Warrior DVD, The Self-Destruction of the Ultimate Warrior. It originally featured derisive interview comments from former opponents like Hulk Hogan, Shawn Michaels and Jerry Lawler, with whom Hart had real-life personal issues (Hart has since made amends with Michaels and Lawler). Hart said of the project: "It was kind of a smear. It was basically a platform for guys to express their dislike for me and their jealousy." Hart was not slated to contribute to the documentary, but later agreed to participate, claiming that WWE essentially told him: "Get on board or we'll run you over."

=== Hart's involvement ===
Negative interviews were thereafter deleted when Hart got involved, and replaced with positive appraisals from alternate former opponents like Stone Cold Steve Austin, Roddy Piper and Chris Benoit, who held Hart in high regard. Hart has said that a major factor in his agreeing to participate in the project was an encounter with a small child in a dentist's office. The child had a Bret Hart action figure, but he had no knowledge of Hart's actual work and was only familiar with WWE video games in which Hart was featured as a "WWE Legend." Hart expressed that he wanted the DVD to be a way for younger people who had no experience watching him while he was estranged from WWE to see him in a more positive light, as opposed to the negative way he felt the company had portrayed him previously. After a promotional photo with WWE chairman Vince McMahon, Hart contributed over seven hours of new interview footage and was allowed full creative input in the project. McMahon noted Bret's participation with a message before the main program in which he thanked Bret for putting aside the various personal and professional differences the two men had in order to produce the DVD for the fans. It has been suggested that the Screwed DVD was conceived by McMahon as a ploy to persuade Hart to the project.

After the DVD's release, Hart was interviewed for WWE.com's show Byte This! and promoted the DVD with a series of appearances to meet, and greet fans. He also appeared at the next year's WWE Hall of Fame to be inducted by Steve Austin.

== Overview ==
Disc 1

The first disc is separated into several smaller segments focusing on different parts of Hart's life.

- Early Years - Hart's beginnings and discussing his father, Stu Hart.
- Stampede Wrestling - Once he starts wrestling for his father, the DVD shows his progression as a technical wrestler in the early matches.
- Coming To WWE - Overview of Hart's early days in the WWF, including a look at one of Hart's abandoned gimmicks, "Cowboy" Bret Hart.
- Hart Foundation - Hart's tag team days with brother-in-law Jim Neidhart and manager "the Mouth Of the South" Jimmy Hart.
- Intercontinental Champion - The beginning of Hart's singles career, starting with his defeat of Mr. Perfect and Roddy Piper to become the Intercontinental Champion.
- WWE Champion - Hart defeated Ric Flair to become the WWF Champion, also includes talks of WrestleMania IX about Yokozuna and Hulk Hogan.
- International Star - A segment discussing Hart's popularity overseas.
- Hart Family Feud - Hart discusses his feud with his brother Owen.
- Iron Man Match - Hart prefaces his comments about his Iron Man Match at WrestleMania XII.
- U.S.A. vs. Canada - The Re-formation of the Hart Foundation and playing the villain in the US during an "anti-American" angle.
- Survivor Series 1997 - The Montreal Screwjob.
- WCW - Hart's departure from WWF and his tenure in World Championship Wrestling.
- The Death Of Owen Hart - On the 1999 pay-per-view, Over the Edge, Owen Hart fell 75 feet into the ring and died.
- Problems In WCW - During a Starrcade PPV, fellow wrestler Bill Goldberg accidentally inflicted Hart with a career ending concussion.
- Living It Up - Hart recalls his recovery from a stroke in 2002.

Bret Hart partakes in several interviews where he discusses specific events, such as the origin of the name "the Dungeon" for his father's training hall, being away from family on Halloween, his friendship with the other Hart Foundation members, learning his signature move: the sharpshooter, his brother's pranks and about his trademark sunglasses. There are also two tribute videos included, one for his older brother Dean who died in 1990 from kidney failure and another for dead wrestlers Hart knew.

Disc 2 and 3

The second and third discs contains a selections of matches from Hart's career. Hart himself chose all the matches presented on the DVD.

== Reception ==
The DVD has received positive reviews. It won the 2006 Wrestling Observer Newsletter award in the category "Best Pro Wrestling Documentary".

=== From Hart ===
Hart has said that he is very happy with how the DVD ended up. Hart has also said that he is very glad that the documentary did not end up like the "Screwed DVD" which it was originally intended. Despite this, Hart has stated that he feels that it is not comprehensive enough and says that he felt that the DVD could have been one or two discs longer and wishes that his match with "Macho Man" Randy Savage from Saturday Night's Main Event XIII could have been included. Said matches could not be included due to legal issues involving Jesse Ventura. Because of this Hart expressed that he wished to do another collection of matches at some time.

== Match content ==
- The Hart Foundation vs. The British Bulldogs (Madison Square Garden, July 13, 1985)
  - Hart tags with his brother-in-law Jim Neidhart against his other brothers-in-law Davey Boy Smith and frequent rival in Stampede Wrestling Dynamite Kid.
- Hart Foundation vs. The Killer Bees (Madison Square Garden, February 17, 1986)
  - Another match from the Hart Foundation's heel run, this time against the tag team The Killer Bees.
  - Jimmy Hart briefly joined the commentary team at ringside.
- Bret Hart vs. Ricky Steamboat (Boston Garden, March 8, 1986)
  - A rare match featuring Hart representing the Hart Foundation against Steamboat.
- Bret Hart vs. Ted DiBiase (Odessa, TX, March 8, 1989)
  - The original commentary was edited out of the match.
- Hart Foundation vs. The Rockers (Saturday Night's Main Event XXVI, April 28, 1990)
  - A tag team match in which Hart faces real-life rival Shawn Michaels, then a part of the tag team The Rockers.
  - This match is missing the original commentary by Jesse "The Body" Ventura, due to an early 1990s lawsuit involving videotape royalties filed by Ventura against the WWF.
- WWF Tag Team Championship Match
  - Hart Foundation vs. The Nasty Boys (WrestleMania VII, March 24, 1991)
  - The face Hart Foundation are tag team champions going against former manager Jimmy Hart and his Nasty Boys. The Hart Foundation's loss in this match set up Hart's successful singles career.
- WWF Intercontinental Match
  - Bret Hart vs. Mr. Perfect (SummerSlam, August 26, 1991)
  - Hart credits Hennig with helping put him over the top in this, his first Intercontinental title win.
- WWF Intercontinental Match
  - Bret Hart vs. British Bulldog (SummerSlam, August 29, 1992)
  - At his 2006 WWE Hall of Fame induction, Hart mentioned this match as his favorite of all time.
- Bret Hart vs. Bam Bam Bigelow (Barcelona, Spain, April 24, 1993)
  - A rare match from Spain, featuring Spanish commentary.
- King of the Ring Semi-Final Match
  - Bret Hart vs. Mr. Perfect (King of the Ring, June 13, 1993)
- Bret Hart vs. Owen Hart (Opening match, WrestleMania X, March 20, 1994)
  - Bret faces his brother Owen in a match with a surprise ending.
- WWF Championship Match
  - Bret Hart vs. Owen Hart (White Plains, New York, September 29, 1994)
  - Hart's favourite match with his brother.
- Bret Hart vs Hakushi (In Your House 1, May 14, 1995)
  - Hart has credited two Japanese wrestlers, Mr. Hito and Mr. Sakurada, with training and teaching him during his early wrestling career. Here he faces off against WWF newcomer Japanese Hakushi.
- WWF Championship Match
  - Bret Hart vs. Diesel (Survivor Series, November 19, 1995)
  - Hart ends the 358-day WWF title reign of Diesel, the longest of the 1990s.
- Bret Hart vs. British Bulldog (In Your House, December 17, 1995)
  - Hart faces a heel Bulldog, who is accompanied by Hart's sister Diana and new manager Jim Cornette.
- Bret Hart vs. Stone Cold Steve Austin (WrestleMania 13, March 23, 1997)
  - A match known from its double turn by both wrestlers, credited with helping launch the career of Austin as a face. The special referee for the match is Ken Shamrock, who would later wrestle for the WWF.
- WWF Championship Match
  - Bret Hart vs. The Undertaker (One Night Only, September 20, 1997)
  - Hart's favourite match with the Undertaker.
- Owen Hart Tribute Match
  - Bret Hart vs. Chris Benoit (WCW Monday Nitro, October 4, 1999)
  - Hart's tribute to his late brother Owen in the same arena Owen fell to his death. He faces one of his and Owen's friends, Chris Benoit.

== See also ==
- Hitman Hart: Wrestling with Shadows
- Bret Hart: Survival of the Hitman
- Hart wrestling family
