= Fight Network =

Canadian television channel dedicated to combat sports

- Country: Canada
- Broadcast area: Canada (National); United States (Optimum USA); Portugal (NOS/Vodafone Portugal); Belgium (Telenet); Angola (ZAP); Mozambique (ZAP); Turkey (Tivibu); Bosnia/Serbia/Montenegro (RTV Pink); Italy; Africa
- Headquarters: Toronto, Ontario

Programming
- Language: English
- Picture format: 480i (SDTV); 1080i (HDTV)

Ownership
- Owner: Anthem Sports & Entertainment
- Sister channels: GameTV; Game+ Pursuit Channel; AXS TV; HDNet Movies

History
- Launched: September 22, 2005; 20 years ago

Links
- Website: Fight Network

Fight Network is a Canadian discretionary specialty channel owned by Anthem Sports & Entertainment. The network broadcasts programming related to combat sports, including mixed martial arts, boxing, kickboxing, and professional wrestling.

== History ==
=== Initial launch and investment ===
Original logo as "The Fight Network", used in various forms until 2011.

The channel was originally conceived in Canada, when it was granted approval from the Canadian Radio-television and Telecommunications Commission (CRTC) on January 30, 2004. The channel, tentatively known as "TFN – The Fight Network", was described as "a national, English-language Category 2 specialty television service devoted to programming related to the arts, skills and science of combatants."

Created and founded by Mike R. Garrow, The Fight Network launched on September 22, 2005. It was initially available on Rogers Cable in Ontario and New Brunswick. Prior to The Fight Network's launch, it acquired professional wrestling radio show Live Audio Wrestling, syndicating it under the Fight Network Radio banner.

BlackOut Communications originally owned The Fight Network, but after several organizational restructurings, Fight Media Inc. assumed ownership. In December 2010, former Canwest CEO Leonard Asper made a "significant investment" in Fight Network, marking his return to the media industry after the bankruptcy and wind-down of Canwest. Asper stated that it was "an exciting opportunity — not without its challenges, but also of course one with significant potential."

In April 2011, to coincide with UFC 129 in Toronto, the network re-branded as simply Fight Network, with a new logo and an associated marketing campaign to promote the network's expanded lineup. A high-definition feed launched in March 2013 initially on Rogers Cable.

On December 22, 2014, Fight Network announced that it had sub-licensed portions of the UFC's new Canadian rights agreement with Bell Media and TSN, including coverage of non-PPV preliminaries, international UFC Fight Night events, as well as other UFC archive programming, and the possibility of collaborating on other ancillary programs with TSN.

In June 2015, Fight Network announced a broadcasting agreement with the World Series of Fighting, covering Canada and other EMEA markets.

=== Acquisition of TNA and subsequent cuts ===
In March 2015, Fight Network acquired Canadian rights to TNA Wrestling programming, including Impact!, Xplosion, and TNA's Wrestling Greatest Matches. In March 2016, TNA expanded its relationship with Fight Network to offer its programming internationally through Fight Network's streaming platforms.

In January 2017, Fight Network's parent company (now known as Anthem Sports & Entertainment) acquired a majority stake in TNA. Under Anthem, the promotion was renamed "Impact Wrestling" after its flagship program. Following the acquisition, Fight Network began cutting its studio programming; in March 2017, long-time Fight Network personalities Robin Black and John Ramdeen were laid off by Anthem. Further layoffs occurred in October 2017, including the entire staff of Live Audio Wrestling (which the network claimed was on a "hiatus"). Wrestling journalist Dave Meltzer reported that these cutbacks stemmed from the TNA buyout, citing that Anthem intended to use the promotion to bolster its programming, especially in international markets, but that the promotion's financial troubles had required Anthem to make cuts to Fight Network.

In December 2018, Bell Media renewed its rights to the UFC, but ended the sublicensing deal with Fight Network.

In 2024, Fight Network acquired Canadian rights to the Professional Fighters League (PFL), including rights to its Champions Series cards, and library content from both PFL and Bellator MMA.

== Programming ==
=== News and original ===
Fight Network produces several weekly news shows, including:

- Fight News Now – Daily news show discussing current events, newsmakers and previewing fights.
- 5 Rounds – Weekly 30-minute talk show featuring mixed martial arts analysis and breakdowns with special guests.
- Toe 2 Toe – Weekly 30-minute interview program featuring sitdowns with combat sports stars and personalities.
- MMA Meltdown with Morency – Weekly mixed martial arts news show, hosted by Gabriel Morency.
- Review-A-Raw – John Pollock and Wai Ting review episodes of WWE Raw.
- Bookie Beatdown – Preview of the odds and fantasy picks ahead of all UFC events.

=== Mixed Martial Arts ===
- World Series of Fighting – a Las Vegas-based organization founded by Ray Sefo.
- ONE Fighting Championship – a Singapore-based promotion.
- Resurrection Fighting Alliance – a U.S.-based MMA organization owned and operated by Ed Soares.
- KSW – Poland-based MMA entity.
- RXF – Romania-based MMA promotion.
- Cage Warriors Fighting Championship – a London-based organization founded in 2001.
- BAMMA – a U.K.-based promotion founded in 2009.
- M-1 Global – a promotion based in Russia partially owned by Fedor Emelianenko. FN aired Emelianenko's last professional bout on June 21, 2012.
- Dream – a now-defunct Japanese promotion promoted by FEG which also owned K-1.
- Final Fight Championship – European-based hybrid MMA and kickboxing events.

Other international MMA promotions aired on FN include M-1 Challenge from Russia and the Netherlands, Ultimate Challenge MMA from the U.K. Extreme Fighting Championship Africa, Super Fight League from India,

Other North American MMA promotions aired on FN include the Canadian MMA promotion SLAMM: Tristar Fights, Battlefield Fight League, Hard Knocks Fighting Championship, Aggression Fighting Championship and Rumble in the Cage.

=== Boxing ===
Fight Network's live boxing programming includes:

- Golden Boy Promotions – Live events presented by Oscar De La Hoya's promotional firm.
- Most Valuable Promotions monthly MVPW women's boxing events
- Hennessy Boxing – a U.K.-based promotional entity.
- Frank Maloney Promotions – a U.K.-based promotional company.
- Eye of the Tiger Boxing – Montreal-based promotional entity.
- Agency Wars – Fight Network original charity amateur boxing production.

Other boxing programming broadcast on FN:

- Golden Boy Classics – Archived Fights from the Golden Boy library.
- Ultimate Classic Boxing – Library of fights from the 50s, 60s and 70s.
- Knockout Files – Compilation of knockouts from international boxing fights.
- InterBox Classics – Bouts presented by the Quebec-based promotional entity.
- Best of G.Y.M. Boxing – Bouts promoted by the Quebec-based organization.
- Banner: Best of the Decade – Classic bouts promoted by Artie Pellulo.
- Best of Hennessy Boxing – Bouts from the U.K.-based Hennessy archive.
- CES Boxing – Cards promoted by Jimmy Burchfield.
- DEKADA BOXING – Professional boxing from Canada.
- Valor Bare Knuckle – Professional bare knuckle boxing. Promoted by Ken Shamrock.

FN's "From The Vault" archive includes fights from Showtime Championship Boxing, ShoBox: The New Generation, Solo Boxeo Tecate, Warriors Boxing, United Promotions, KZ Event Productions, Ballroom Boxing, 12 Round Promotions and Legends of the Ring.

=== Kickboxing ===
- GLORY – international promotion.

=== Grappling ===
- ADCC, Best Of – Compilations of matches from the Abu Dhabi Combat Club Submission Wrestling World Championship.
- Professional Submission League – L.A. Sub X and X-Mission events.
- World Pro Jiu-Jitsu Cup – International grappling tournaments.
- Budo Challenge – Grappling event produced by Rickson Gracie.

=== Other traditional ===
- World Combat Games – The SportAccord World Combat Games, featuring 15 Olympic and non-Olympic sports, including akido, boxing, fencing, judo, BJJ, karate, kendo, kickboxing, Muay Thai, sambo, savate, sumo, taekwondo, wrestling and wushu.
- International Judo Federation – International sanctioning body for judo. Tournaments include Grand Prix, Grand Slam and Olympic qualification.
- World Karate Federation – Largest governing body for sport karate recognized by International Olympic Committee. FN broadcasts Junior and Senior Karate World Championships.
- World Taekwondo Federation – A member of the International Olympic Committee, events feature the traditional martial art of taekwondo.

=== Professional wrestling ===
- TNA Impact
- Destiny Wrestling Haywire – Destiny's weekly show, taped in Mississauga at the Don Kolov Arena.
- TNA Xplosion
- Impact Wrestling's Greatest Matches
- Ring of Honor Wrestling
- Consejo Mundial de Lucha Libre – Weekly show based in Mexico City showcasing Lucha libre professional wrestling.
- House of Hardcore – US-based promotion founded by Tommy Dreamer.
- Insane Championship Wrestling Friday Night Fight Club – ICW's weekly show, filmed in Glasgow, Scotland.
- International Pro Wrestling UK – Episodic weekly show from IPW:UK
- Review-A-Raw – John Pollock and Wai Ting review weekly editions of WWE Raw.
- Review-A-SmackDown – John Pollock and Wai Ting review weekly editions of WWE SmackDown.
- Fighting Spirit Wrestling – Compilation matches from Japan (New Japan Pro Wrestling) and Mexico (CMLL).
- Ultimate Classic Wrestling – Early careers of notable wrestling stars from the USWA and other promotions.
- CMLL Wrestling – World's oldest pro wrestling promotion based in Mexico.
- CMLL Minis – Features the Mini-Estrella division with lucha libre-style wrestling from Mexico.
- New Frontier Pro – TV-14 Canadian Pro Wrestling featuring "Redefined Rules of Engagement", and some of Canada's best independent talent.
- New Japan Pro-Wrestling – Japan-based promotion founded by Antonio Inoki.
- Ring of Honor, Best of – Wrestling promotion from the U.S. featuring early matches.
- WrestleCentre – Canadian promotion from Nova Scotia.
- Smash Wrestling – Canadian promotion from Toronto.
- Catalyst Wrestling- Independent wrestling promotion from the U.S.
- International Wrestling Syndicate – Canadian promotion from Montreal.

FN's "From The Vault" archive includes matches from Impact Wrestling, Dragon Gate USA, Pro Wrestling Noah and Best of Memphis and St. Louis Wrestling.

=== Reality ===
- Master Toddy's Tuff Girls – 14 women live together and train under Master Toddy as they compete in an elimination-style contest for a chance to win a Muay Thai championship in Thailand.
- Fight Girls – 10 female fighters live together and train with Master Toddy in Las Vegas before they vie for a world championship in Thailand. Features Gina Carano.
- Gotta Grudge? – Real people settle their real life grudges in amateur boxing fights.
- Ninja Warrior – Olympic athletes, fighters and professional wrestlers try to conquer a difficult obstacle course.
- Kill Arman – Unfit and with no previous experience, Arman has six months to learn to fight 10 different warriors with 10 martial arts in 10 countries.
- Amir Khan's Angry Young Men – Series documenting former WBA champion Amir Khan and how he mentored troubled angry men, helping them focus on family values and faith.
- T.O.P. Army Boxer & T.O.P. Army Fighter – Series profiles members of the American military competing in boxing and MMA bouts before they are deployed for duty overseas.
- Ross Kemp – Kemp interviewed gang members around the world. First broadcast in 2006. The first series featured gangs and police corruption in Brazil, Maori gangs in New Zealand, neo-Nazi skinheads in California, and gangsters in London. The second series featured "MS13" from El Salvador, neo-Nazis in Russia, skinheads in Poland, American "Bloods" and "Crips" gangs in St. Louis, and the Numbers gang in South Africa. In addition, Ross Kemp in Afghanistan documents Kemp as he followed the 1st Battalion of the British Army's Royal Anglian Regiment during their deployment to Afghanistan's Helmand Province from March to August 2007.
- Danny Dyer's Deadliest Men – Documentary series profiling Danny Dyer venturing into the dark depths of the British underworld and hunting down some of the most notorious and feared criminals in the U.K.
- Chris Ryan's Elite Police – Best-selling author Chris Ryan travels the world's crime and terror hotspots to train and operate alongside a new breed of law enforcer – the Elite Police. Series shows high-tech weaponry taking on the terrorist threat in Kazakhstan, close combat shootouts in the slums of Brazil, violent clashes with Mexican drug cartels and airborne Colombian hit squads taking out the cocaine labs.
- Truth Duty Valour – Each episode profiles the intense training and competition the Canadian military undergoes to maintain operational readiness for deployments overseas.
- Road Wars – Follows the 14 members of the Thames Valley Police's roads policing proactive unit while they carried out their duties. The program has documented the changing tactics of criminals, perhaps most importantly their increasing violence and recklessness, and the response of the U.K. police forces.
- WWE Tough Enough – Participants undergo professional wrestling training and compete for a contract with WWE. Hosted by Steve Austin.

=== Documentaries ===
- Bret Hart: Survival of the Hitman – Fight Network original documentary chronicling Bret Hart's life as he prepared for his in-ring return at WrestleMania XXVI. First aired March 22, 2010.
- La Fosse aux Tigres - Fight Network and Canal D original documentary about professional fighter Dave Leduc and his journey into Lethwei. First aired November 9, 2017.

=== On radio ===
- Live Audio Wrestling (The LAW) – Wrestling and MMA talk show that airs online, on SiriusXM's Canada Talks and on TSN Radio 1050.

On May 23, 2013, Fight Network launched three weekly talk shows on SiriusXM's Canada Talks.

== International ==
Fight Network's first international agreement was with American IPTV provider Backspace. Fight Network launched on their system in the United States in 2007; however, after several months, Backspace removed the channel from its systems.

Fight Network opened an office in Ecuador as part of unrealized plans for an expansion in that region. In 2008, Anthem purchased UK-based TWC Fight! and subsequently rebranded the network as a domestic version of The Fight Network. The network was shut down on December 1, 2008.

In November 2012, Fight Network expanded into the U.S. market with the launch of a subscription service on NeuLion.

In July 2015, Fight Network launched on Suddenlink Communications now (Optimum USA) across the United States

From July 2018 until 2020, Fight Network returned to the UK as a program block on Showcase TV.
