= Bertrand Hébert =

Bertrand Hébert is a Québécois professional wrestling historian and writer. He is the author of several books on the discipline, some of which are in Quebec French.

== Works ==
- Mad Dog: The Maurice Vachon Story - with Pat Laprade
- Mad Dogs, Midgets and Screw Jobs: The Untold Story of How Montreal Shaped the World of Wrestling - with Pat Laprade
- À la semaine prochaine, si Dieu le veut: L'histoire inédite de la lutte professionnelle au Québec (2013) - with Pat Laprade
- Accepted: How the First Gay Superstar Changed WWE - with Pat Patterson
- The Eighth Wonder of the World: The True Story of André the Giant (2020) - with Pat Laprade and Tony Stabile

== Awards and accomplishments ==
- Wrestling Observer Newsletter
  - Best Pro Wrestling Book (2013) for Mad Dogs, Midgets and Screw Jobs
- Cauliflower Alley Club
  - James C. Melby Historian Award (2025) shared with Pat Laprade

== See also ==
- James C. Melby
