= Carl De Marco =

Canadian sports agent

Carl De Marco is a Canadian sports agent best known for being the President of World Wrestling Federation Canada (now WWE Canada) from 1995 to 2009. He is also the business manager of professional wrestler Bret Hart.

== Awards and recognitions ==
- Canadian Wrestling Hall of Fame
  - Class of 1998

== See also ==
- List of WWE personnel
