= Hitman Hart: Wrestling with Shadows =

1998 film by Paul Jay

- 10th anniversary edition cover.
- Directed by: Paul Jay
- Written by: Paul Jay
- Produced by: Paul Jay; Sally Blake; David M. Ostriker; Silva Basmajian (NFB)
- Starring: Bret Hart; Vince McMahon; Shawn Michaels; Stu Hart; Owen Hart; Davey Boy Smith; Jim Neidhart; Stone Cold Steve Austin; The Undertaker; Triple H
- Cinematography: Joan Hutton
- Edited by: Manfred Becker
- Distributed by: Vidmark/Trimark
- Release date: December 20, 1998
- Running time: 93 minutes
- Country: Canada
- Language: English

Hitman Hart: Wrestling with Shadows is a 1998 Canadian documentary film directed, produced and written by Paul Jay. It follows Bret "The Hitman" Hart during his last year in the WWF, from his WWF Championship victory at SummerSlam to his final match with the company and the infamous Montreal Screwjob at the pay-per-view Survivor Series on November 9, 1997.

Hitman Hart: Wrestling with Shadows was released by Vidmark/Trimark on December 20, 1998.

== Synopsis ==
In 1997, Vince McMahon's World Wrestling Federation (WWF) is embroiled in a fierce corporate rivalry with Ted Turner's World Championship Wrestling (WCW), which will come to be known as "The Monday Night War" among wrestling fans. Amid this rivalry, star WWF performer Bret "The Hitman" Hart finds his loyalties to his employers unexpectedly tested when he is offered a highly lucrative contract with WCW, their chief competitor. Although he is tempted by the prospect of a large salary with another company, he views Vince McMahon as a mentor and father figure, and he feels conflicted about leaving his longtime employer while they're struggling to overcome WCW in the ratings.

In the interim, Hart struggles with developing a marketable public image. While he takes great pride in playing the role of a beloved hero ("face", in wrestling parlance), his superiors at the WWF fear that his heroic persona is seen as outdated and old-fashioned by the current generation of wrestling fans, who are increasingly showing a predilection for morally ambiguous antiheroes—a trend exemplified by the ascendance of Hart's rival "Stone Cold" Steve Austin. At the urging of WWF management, Hart reluctantly agrees to adopt the role of an arrogant bully who antagonizes fans and spouts anti-American rhetoric, which greatly conflicts with his desire to act as a positive role model for young fans. He is allowed to continue playing the role of a hero while performing for audiences in his native Canada, where he is widely viewed as a cultural icon.

Despite his initial misgivings about leaving the WWF, Hart is ultimately left with no choice after McMahon chooses to rescind an earlier offer of a 20-year contract to stay with the company. But since Hart is the reigning WWF Champion at the time, his looming departure forces the company to choose a new champion to succeed him. As Hart prepares for his final match with the WWF in November 1997, it is determined that his last match will pit him against his longtime rival Shawn Michaels in a televised bout at the Molson Centre in Montreal, Quebec. In a recorded conversation discussing the predetermined outcome of the match, McMahon agrees that the match will end in Hart's disqualification (making it a draw), and that Hart won't be forced to lose to Michaels, whom he is widely known to personally dislike.

When the night of the match arrives, it takes an unexpected turn when referee Earl Hebner prematurely rings the bell while Michaels has Hart in a "Sharpshooter" submission hold (Hart's signature move), resulting in Michaels being declared the winner—even though Hart never submitted. Immediately realizing that McMahon broke his word, Hart angrily spits in the WWF chairman's face in full view of the audience before storming off-camera. Later, backstage footage shows Hart's wife Julie confronting Michaels and his tag-team partner Hunter Hearst Helmsley, accusing them of knowing in advance about McMahon's plan to change the outcome of the match, which both men deny. Furious at McMahon for betraying him, Hart eventually confronts his former mentor in the dressing room, leading to a physical altercation that ends with Hart punching him.

In the final scenes, Hart spends time at home with his family some time after starting work as a WCW entertainer, while his former rivals Michaels and Helmsley ridicule him in a televised comedic sketch on the WWF's Monday Night Raw. While still noticeably bitter about his mentor's betrayal, Hart claims that he is at peace, and ready to begin the next phase of his career. In a voiceover, he expresses pride in staying true to his ideals and refusing to compromise his integrity, but he opines that his in-ring alter ego "The Hitman" was murdered in Montreal, bringing his story to an end.

== Production ==
Wrestling with Shadows is co-produced by High Road Productions Inc. and the National Film Board of Canada (NFB). It was released on VHS format to both the United States and United Kingdom in 1999. It has been available on DVD in the United Kingdom since 2004. On February 3, 2009, Wrestling with Shadows: The 10th Anniversary Collectors Edition was released on DVD for the first time in the United States. This two-disc edition includes the movie, interviews with Bret Hart and director Paul Jay ten years later and "The Life and Death of Owen Hart" documentary.

In an interview featured on the two-disc special edition, Jay states that the filmmakers had a contract with McMahon to provide not only stock footage, but the waivers for the use of the names and likeness of the other wrestlers featured in the film. After the fallout from Montreal, McMahon feared how he would be portrayed in the film and refused both. The director goes on to state that WCW contacted the filmmakers and not only offered to pay for the lawsuit at an estimated cost of $750,000, but also offered a pay-per-view deal for the film and long-term distribution on the Turner network. Once McMahon became aware of this, the producers received a fax from Titan Sports Inc. saying that they would honor their original contract on the condition that the lawsuit be dropped and they could never sell the film to Turner. Jay said they were told they had a "slam-dunk" case but when asked about the film, they were told they would most likely be in court three to four years and "there would be no film" even if they won. Jay decided to make the film and drop the lawsuit. The director goes on to state that McMahon also used his reputation to kill some of the distribution deals in the U.S. and overseas.

During Wrestling Observer Live on October 26, 2022, Dave Meltzer announced he took part in the recording on a commentary track with Bret Hart for a 25th Anniversary release.

== Reception ==
The film was well received at the time and is today considered to be critically acclaimed. It won numerous film festival awards and has aired several times on both A&E and the Documentary Channel as well as on BBC Two in the United Kingdom; after a 1999 airing on BBC Two, journalist Greg Wood of The Independent described it "a story beautifully told".

Wrestling historian Dave Meltzer has stated that Wrestling with Shadows, together with Beyond the Mat, are the two most critically acclaimed wrestling documentaries. The Canadian film study book North of Everything: English-Canadian Cinema Since 1980 declared the film to be one of the best National Film Board documentaries of the period and worthy of John Grierson's mission for the NFB.

The film won the Best Canadian Feature Documentary award at the 1999 Hot Docs Canadian International Documentary Festival.

== Soundtrack ==
A soundtrack album inspired by Bret Hart's music choices was released on Nettwerk Records under the Unforscene Music imprint on October 19, 1999.

1. Keith Scott – Hitman Theme Intro
2. Rascalz – Sharpshooter (Best of da Best)
3. DDT – Lie Detector
4. Rob Zombie – Superbeast
5. Gob – Self-Appointed Leader
6. Gloritone – Halfway
7. Bryan Adams – Only the Strong Survive
8. Sebadoh – Flame
9. BTK – Peppyrock
10. Days of the New – Touch, Peel and Stand
11. Keith Scott – Original score
12. Moist – Resurrection
13. Econoline Crush – Sparkle & Shine
14. S.O.F.T. – Second Coming
15. Keith Scott – Original score

== See also ==
- Bret "Hit Man" Hart: The Best There Is, the Best There Was, the Best There Ever Will Be
- Bret Hart: Survival of the Hitman
