= The Real News Network =

North America-based news organization

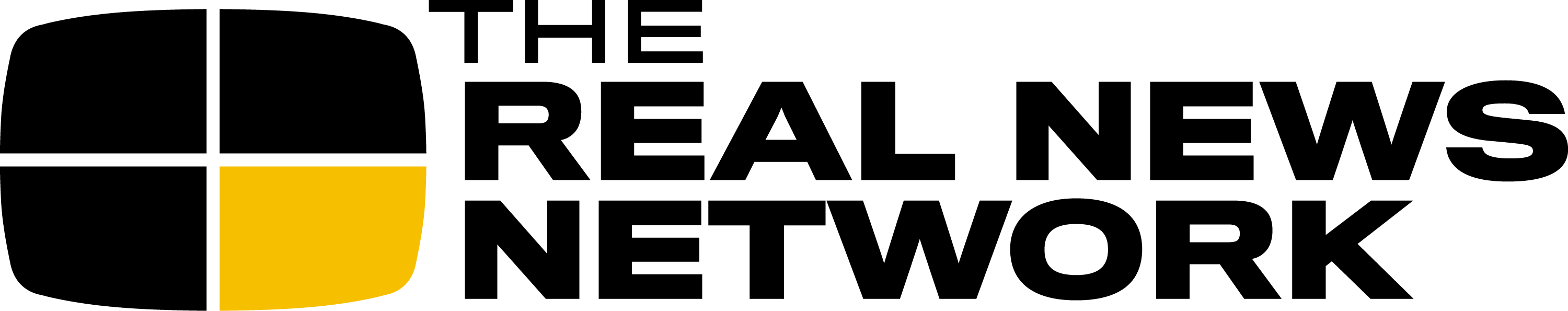
- Website type: Daily news
- Editor: Maximillian Alvarez
- Website: www.therealnews.com
- Launched: 2007

The Real News Network (TRNN) is a news organization based in Baltimore, Maryland, that covers both national and international news with a left leaning point of view. It includes both for-profit arm and non-profit organizations.

== History ==
TRNN was founded by documentary producer Paul Jay and Mishuk Munier in September 2003 in Toronto, with the goal of creating a news network that made complicated concepts accessible to the average person.

TRNN moved to Baltimore in June 2014, with the focus of telling stories about urban America, specifically focusing on the city's issues, including crime, education, and housing that are found throughout the United States. Founder Paul Jay was ousted from the Real News Network in June, 2019. Communications executive John Duda became the organization's executive director in June 2020.

In 2022, Dharna Noor used to lead the climate team at TRNN.

Maximillian Alvarez became Editor-in-Chief. He was formerly a temporary warehouse worker, an experience which he says impacts whose stories he covers and how.

== Funding ==
In January 2007, Paul Jay told the Daily Kos that TRNN did not accept funding from advertising, governments, or corporations. In December 2018, Baltimore Magazine quoted Jay as saying the budget was $3.3 million which accrued from large and small donations from viewers and foundations, as well as a for-profit segment.

== Content ==
As of 2019, TRNN produced five-to-seven minute news reports available online or video on demand.

In 2016, former Black Panther Marshall "Eddie" Conway became the host and producer of "Rattling the Bars," a weekly investigative program about prison systems in the US and abroad.

TRNN's Police Accountability Report was led by investigative reporters Taya Graham and Stephen Janis. They were some of the first journalists to cover the story of Anton Black, a 19 year old who died after being pinned to the ground by police in rural Maryland.

Independent journalist Michael Fox's podcast "Brazil on Fire" is a joint project of The Real News Network and NACLA.

== See also ==
- Alternative media
- Independent media
