= Pat Laprade =

Canadian professional wrestling historian

Patric Laprade is a Canadian professional wrestling historian and French-speaking Quebecer best known for his several award winning books on Canadian and women's wrestling. and working for TVA Sports as an interviewer and was a French language broadcaster of Monday Night RAW. He is also the founder and caretaker of the Quebec Wrestling Hall of Fame and has been part of organizing women's wrestling events.

== Works ==
- Mad Dog: The Maurice Vachon Story - with Bertrand Hébert
- Mad Dogs, Midgets and Screw Jobs: The Untold Story of How Montreal Shaped the World of Wrestling - with Bertrand Hébert
- Sisterhood of the Squared Circle: The History and Rise of Women's Wrestling

== Awards and accomplishments ==
- Wrestling Observer Newsletter
  - Best Pro Wrestling Book (2013) for Mad Dogs, Midgets and Screw Jobs
- Cauliflower Alley Club
  - James C. Melby Historian Award (2025) shared with Bertrand Hébert

== See also ==
- James C. Melby
- List of Wrestling Observer Newsletter award winners for Best Pro Wrestling Book
