= Cheerleader Melissa =

American professional wrestler (born 1982)

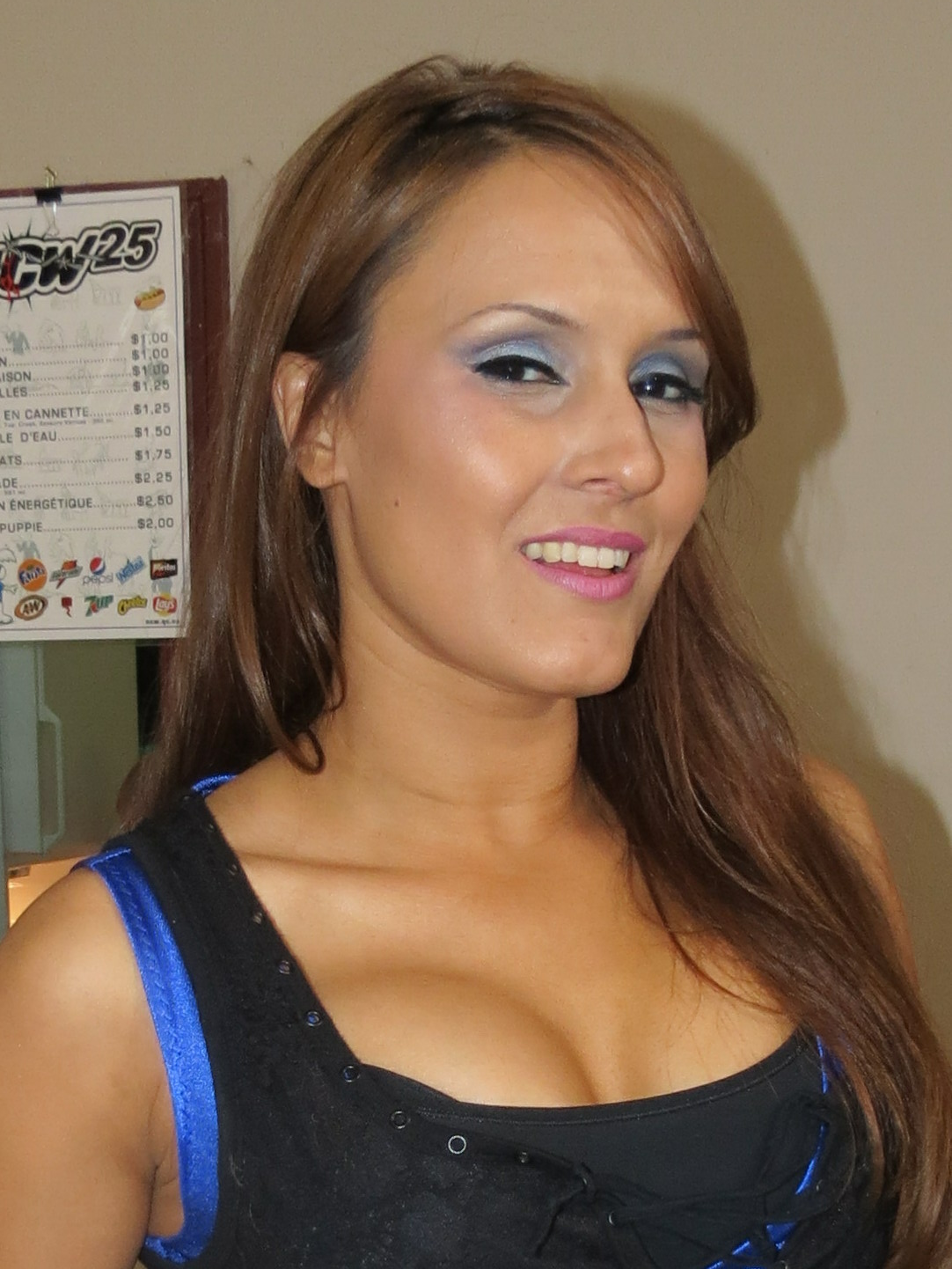
- Melissa in 2012

Personal information
- Born: Melissa Anderson; August 17, 1982 (age 44) Los Angeles, California, U.S.

Professional wrestling career
- Ring names: Alissa Flash; Cheerleader Melissa; Malicia; Mariposa; Melissa; Melissa Anderson; Raisha Saeed; Sheila Cardinal; Wildfire; Candi
- Billed height: 5 ft 8 in (1.73 m)
- Billed weight: 142 lb (64 kg; 10.1 st)
- Billed from: Damascus, Syria; Los Angeles, California; San Francisco, California
- Trained by: Christopher Daniels; Billy Anderson; Robert Thompson; Bryan Danielson; Mariko Yoshida
- Debut: August 17, 1999

Melissa Anderson (born August 17, 1982) is an American professional wrestler, better known by her ring name Cheerleader Melissa. She is best known for her work in Total Nonstop Action Wrestling, where she worked as Alissa Flash and Raisha Saeed. She is currently performing on the independent circuit for promotions such as Shimmer Women Athletes, where she is a former two-time Shimmer Champion. In 2013, Anderson was ranked number 1 in Pro Wrestling Illustrated's annual Top 50 Females list; the first Independent women's wrestler to top the list.

== Early life ==
Anderson's father wrestled professionally in the early 1980s. Growing up she became a fan of her father's work and began showing an aptitude for sports, particularly soccer, as well as joining Palmdale High School's athletics and amateur wrestling team as one of only four girls. When only 15, she had already become involved in the wrestling business, traveling to San Bernardino frequently to train in and work for the wrestling school of Billy Anderson, her father's former tag team partner, as well as involving herself in the running of things and before long she made her debut front of stage. Despite touring so young, Anderson still studied and gained her high school diploma largely through the help of e-mailing teachers; she also credits the Internet for helping her become famous while only wrestling in front of small crowds.

== Professional wrestling career ==
=== Training ===
While training at Billy Anderson's school, she met the Ballard Brothers (Shannon and Shane) who were using the gimmick of hockey players, similar to the Hanson Brothers from the film Slap Shot. They were looking for a valet and due to their sporting gimmick, Anderson took on the role of a heel and the gimmick of a cheerleader. They toured the West Coast, mostly appearing with All Pro Wrestling (APW) where she would interfere in matches, often using high-flying moves. As Cheerleader Melissa she also received training from Christopher Daniels for a short period of time before moving on to APW where she trained under the tutelage of Robert Thompson and "American Dragon" Bryan Danielson.

After gaining experience from ring side, Cheerleader Melissa eventually had her first proper match on her 17th birthday against Lexie Fyfe in a losing effort at an outdoor carnival event. In 2001, she entered into Ultimate Pro Wrestling and lost a tag team match alongside Looney Lane which led to a feud between the two. The first loss in the tag team match would be her only one with the company as she went on to win a grudge match between the two followed by a succession of mixed tag matches, first with Shannon Ballard and then alongside both Ballard Brothers, beating Lane and Frankie Kazarian in the mixed tag team match as well as Nova in the final six-person intergender tag match. The following year, in the summer of 2002, Anderson was personally invited to wrestle and train for three months in Japan for the promotion Arsion. She was selected alongside Taylor Matheny who had recently received exposure in World Wrestling Entertainment's Tough Enough program, and thus Anderson received much internet attention by association. Among the rigorous training schedule she wrestled what she claims to be some of her favorite matches, particularly a 15-minute draw against Rie Tamada and her loss to Mariko Yoshida. Also as a present for her 20th birthday, she was allowed to tag team with veteran female wrestler Lioness Asuka.

=== ChickFight ===
==== Tournaments (2004–2007) ====
After Anderson returned from Japan, she became a full-time wrestler. Moving on from her pre-Japan feud with Nikki, she continued to wrestle for APW winning its Above The Law Championship from Robert Thompson in July 2004. Under her reign it was renamed the Future Legends Championship, the title under which she lost it to Daizee Haze the following year before winning it back and retiring the belt. In October, APW associated itself with the newly formed, all-female tournament-cum-promotion ChickFight (CF). In the first event, staged under the APW banner for their Halloween Hell weekend, Anderson made it through two rounds only to be defeated in a steel cage match for the final round by luchadora Princess Sugey.

She would become a staple of ChickFight, appearing at the first ten of their major events, missing the eleventh event due to injury sustained less than a week before the show. She made the final in the first two tournaments but exited the third in the first round after a double disqualification during a match with former rival Nikki, now under her better known name Sara Del Rey. Melissa won ChickFight V tournament, beating Jazz in the final, and she also went on to win ChickFight VII: The UK vs The USA tournament when it moved from the United States over to the United Kingdom pinning "The Jezebel" Eden Black in the last match. However, the focus of ChickFight VII was on the controversial ending to her first match that saw Sweet Saraya's head hung in the ropes, Anderson continued to assault her despite being trapped until the referee ended the match and Saraya was stretchered from ringside. As Anderson celebrated her tournament victory Saraya reappeared and threatened her. The feud was cut short during a pre-match brawl for Real Quality Wrestling (RQW) in June that saw the two brawl both in and outside of the building and ended with Anderson winning shortly after Saraya was thrown on an already utilized aluminum can, tearing through her ligament and leaving her hospitalized. She was forced to forfeit her ChickFight IX: Our Final Chance match the following day and would not wrestle again for six months.

==== Feud with Wesna (2007–2009) ====
Melissa using the Kudo Driver on Wesna during their 45-minute draw

Meanwhile, Anderson had begun a new feud. She did not participate in the tournament at ChickFight VIII but instead had a rematch against Eden Black for the newly created Transatlantic Women's Championship, which she won. Later in the show she successfully defended the title against Croatian wrestler Wesna Busic. The two had met years previously when her internet celebrity saw her invited to German Stampede Wrestling to face Wesna in a losing effort at International Impact I. After defending her Transatlantic Championship at ChickFight VII, their next CF meeting saw Wesna defend her RQW Women's Championship fought under ChickFight Rules (no disqualification and falls count anywhere) which saw the two go to a forty-five-minute time limit draw. This left the two at 1–1 and so a decisive match was to be held at ChickFight X but this ended in controversy when Wesna claimed that her tap out was merely an attempt to grab the rope for a rope break; their rematch later that night saw Wesna pick up the victory leaving them drawn again at 2–2. CF XI was originally slated to be a two out of three falls match to find a decisive victory until Anderson pulled out due to injury.

Their feud was picked up the following year for Shimmer Women Athletes at Volume 23 in May 2009. The company preluded the match with a video package showing their matches in Europe and announced that the winner would go on to face the Shimmer Champion at a later event. Towards the end of the bout, Annie Social came to the ring to distract Anderson allowing Wesna to use her CB4 Driver to pick up the victory. Wesna lost her championship match at Volume 25 and, owing to the controversy of their previous match, Anderson wrestled Wesna again in Volume 26 in a Knockout/Submission match where Anderson picked up the victory, making them level once more.

==== Pro Wrestling Revolution (2008–2014) ====
Back in her home state of California, Anderson competed for the National Wrestling Alliance's Pro Wrestling Revolution (PWR) promotion in a series of matches fought under the ChickFight banner. After her first loss in an NWA World Women's Championship match against MsChif, (see below) she went on a winning streak under the gimmicks of both Cheerleader Melissa and Raisha Saeed. This streak included a victory against Lacey Von Erich in one of her first matches, as well as double victories over Christie Ricci, Christina Von Eerie and Rain, the latter two under both characters. This long series of wins led to her, under the Alissa Flash name, competing against the luchadora Lady Apache to crown the inaugural PWR Women's Champion on January 30, 2010. In losing her first match in 20 months, she lost out on the championship. A year later, on February 5 she wrestled in Shantelle Malawski's retirement match, picking up the victory. On February 23, 2013, Melissa defeated Dark Angel to win the vacant PWR Women's Championship for the first time. She lost the title to Ivelisse Vélez on April 21 at a pay-per-view held by the Puerto Rican World Wrestling League (WWL) promotion. She regained the championship three weeks later at a PWR event on May 11. On February 22, 2014, Melissa lost the PWR Women's Championship to Christina Von Eerie in a three-way match, which also included Savanah Riley.

=== Shimmer Women Athletes ===
==== Storyline with MsChif (2005–2010) ====
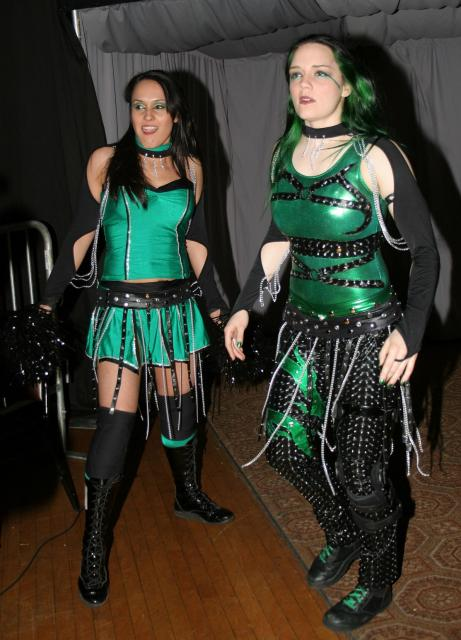
Melissa and MsChif had a lengthy rivalry and then formed a tag team

After the success of ChickFight, Dave Prazak and Allison Danger set up Shimmer Women Athletes, a promotion with ties to Prazak's Ring of Honor intending to raise the credibility of women's wrestling on an international scale. Her first match with the promotion was on November 6, 2005, for Volume 1 in a losing effort to MsChif, starting a wild feud between the two. The loss saw Anderson demand a special attraction rematch—the match would be Shimmer's first hardcore match, fought under Falls Count Anywhere rules and helped Anderson gain the victory after nearly thirty minutes of wrestling on February 12, 2006, at Volume 4. MsChif took her revenge at Volume 5 by distracting Anderson during a match with Allison Danger, causing her to lose the match. Naturally the rivalry was not abated and their next match, main eventing Volume 6 on May 21, was declared a Last Woman Standing match with MsChif eventually coming out on top. Further interferences took an interesting turn at Volume 7 when Anderson came out during MsChif's match against Rain. However, before she could interfere, Rain's partner Lacey pushed her to the ground while trying to distract the referee in order to allow Rain to use an illegal weapon; an incensed Anderson fought back against Lacey in time for the referee to see the foreign object in the ring and declare MsChif the winner via disqualification. After Anderson had won her main event match, Lacey and Rain (The Minnesota Home Wrecking Crew), ambushed her with a beat down until MsChif ran out, saving her nemesis before leaving her to celebrate the victory. The Minnesota Home Wrecking Crew had threatened Anderson for involving herself in their plans against MsChif and similarly threatened MsChif for being in the way of ambushing Melissa and, after declaring themselves the best tag team in the world, demanded a match with the two for Volume 8 which became the penultimate bout of the evening. The Home Wrecking Crew's experience won out over MsChif and Anderson when a double team maneuver led to MsChif being pinned; after the match Anderson and MsChif shook hands as a sign of respect. The two soon showed they could work as a team though when they beat veterans The Experience (Lexie Fyfe and Malia Hosaka), with MsChif pinning Hosaka.

The two would meet again three months later in England for RQW's 2007 No Pain, No Gain event challenging Eden Black for the RQW Women's Championship but both came up short. The match served to build up interest for the aforementioned ChickFight VII: The UK vs The USA where Melissa would secure a victory against Black. She also beat MsChif in the semi-final. At RQW's Taking On The World the three met again with MsChif and Black teaming up in a losing effort against Anderson and Black's nemesis Jetta. In May 2008 MsChif put her NWA World Women's Championship on the line during Pro Wrestling Revolution's debut show but Anderson did not win the belt.

These series of bouts against each other did not stop them teaming together when they main evented Volume 17 on April 26, 2008, taking on an erstwhile enemy of Anderson again in the form of Sara Del Rey, alongside her Dangerous Angels partner Allison Danger. This time it was Melissa making the pinfall after an Air Raid Crash. Despite these string of successes, the tag team did not compete during the Volume 21 tag team gauntlet for the Shimmer Tag Team Championship, but they reunited when MsChif was threatened by both Kong and Del Rey for her Shimmer Championship. With both Kong and Del Rey wanting title shots, the two tag teams were actually booked for a contendership match for the Tag Team Championship during Volume 24 on May 2, 2009, which Anderson and MsChif lost. After this loss, Anderson went on a four match winning streak, including avenging a loss to Wesna Busic (see above). On April 10, 2010, at the tapings of Volume 29, Anderson and MsChif received a shot at the Shimmer Tag Team Championship, but were defeated by the defending champions Nicole Matthews and Portia Perez. The team's two back-to-back tag team losses led to Melissa dissolving her team with MsChif in order for her to focus on her singles career.

==== Shimmer Champion (2010–2014) ====
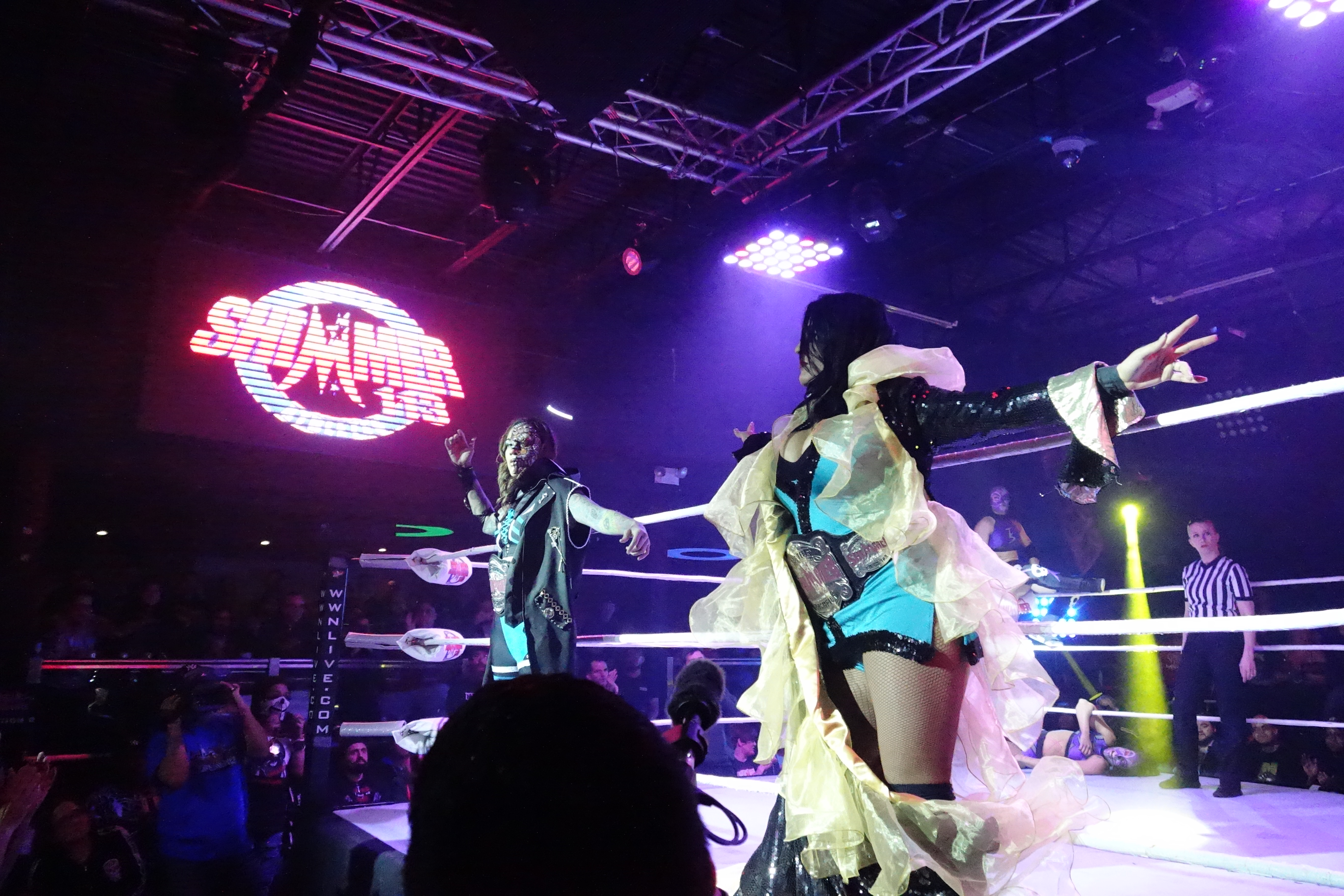
Martinez and Cheerleader Melissa as Shimmer Tag Champions

On Volume 30, Anderson was defeated by Madison Eagles in a match, where the winner would receive a shot at MsChif's Shimmer Championship. The following day Anderson defeated Misaki Ohata on Volume 31 and Ayako Hamada in the main event of Volume 32, before demanding a title match from the new Shimmer Champion Eagles. She received her title match on September 11, 2010, on Volume 33, but was defeated by Eagles. The following day on Volume 36 Melissa pinned Eagles to win an eight-woman elimination tag team match, where she, Ayako Hamada, Ayumi Kurihara and Serena Deeb defeated Eagles, Daizee Haze, Sara Del Rey and Tomoka Nakagawa. On October 2, 2011, at Volume 43, Melissa defeated Kana to become the number one contender to the Shimmer Championship. Later that same day on Volume 44, Melissa defeated Madison Eagles to become the fourth Shimmer Champion. During her title celebration, she was attacked from behind by Nicole Matthews. Melissa made her first two title defenses on March 17, 2012, defeating Nicole Matthews on Volume 45 and Portia Perez on Volume 46. The following day, after successfully defending the Shimmer Championship against Jessie McKay on Volume 47, Melissa lost the title to Saraya Knight on Volume 48. After pinning Knight to win a ten-woman elimination tag team match on October 28 at the tapings of Volume 50, Melissa was granted a rematch for the Shimmer Championship the following day on Volume 52, but was defeated after being hit with the title belt. On April 6, 2013, at the Volume 53 internet pay-per-view (iPPV) in Secaucus, New Jersey, Melissa defeated Knight in a steel cage match to win the Shimmer Championship for the second time. Melissa made her first successful title defense a week later on April 13 at Volume 54, where she defeated Mercedes Martinez. Later that same day on Volume 55, Melissa made another successful title defense against Courtney Rush. The following day on Volume 56, Melissa made her third and final title defense of the weekend by defeating Kalamity. Later that same day on Volume 57, Melissa took part in Allison Danger's retirement match, where she and Ayako Hamada faced Danger and Leva Bates. Melissa initially submitted Danger for the win, but the decision was reversed when Melissa turned heel and refused to let go of the hold after the match. Post-match, the evil Melissa completed her heel turn by attacking Hamada. On October 19 at Volume 58, Melissa made her fourth successful title defense against Leva Bates. Post-match Melissa attacked both Bates and the retired Allison Danger, before being chased away by LuFisto. Later that same day, after another successful defense against Hiroyo Matsumoto on Volume 59, Melissa was again run off by LuFisto, who was, as a result, named the next challenger for her Shimmer Championship. The title match between Melissa and LuFisto took place on the following day's Volume 60 and saw Melissa retain the title. Following the match, Melissa was taken to a local hospital, where she received ten stitches above her left eye. As a result, Volume 61 became the first Volume in Shimmer history, which did not feature a Cheerleader Melissa match. On April 5 at the Volume 62 iPPV in New Orleans, Louisiana, Melissa successfully defended the Shimmer Championship against LuFisto in a two out of three falls match, following outside interference from Mercedes Martinez. A week later on Volume 64, Melissa made another successful title defense against Japanese wrestler Yumi Ohka. On April 13, Melissa first successfully defended the Shimmer Championship against Mia Yim on Volume 65, before teaming with Mercedes Martinez to unsuccessfully challenge the Global Green Gangsters (Kellie Skater and Tomoka Nakagawa) for the Shimmer Tag Team Championship on Volume 66. On October 18, Melissa first made another successful defense of the Shimmer Championship against Kana on Volume 67, before losing the title to Nicole Matthews in a four-way elimination match, also involving Athena and Madison Eagles, on Volume 68.

=== Total Nonstop Action Wrestling ===
==== Raisha Saeed (2008–2009, 2023) ====
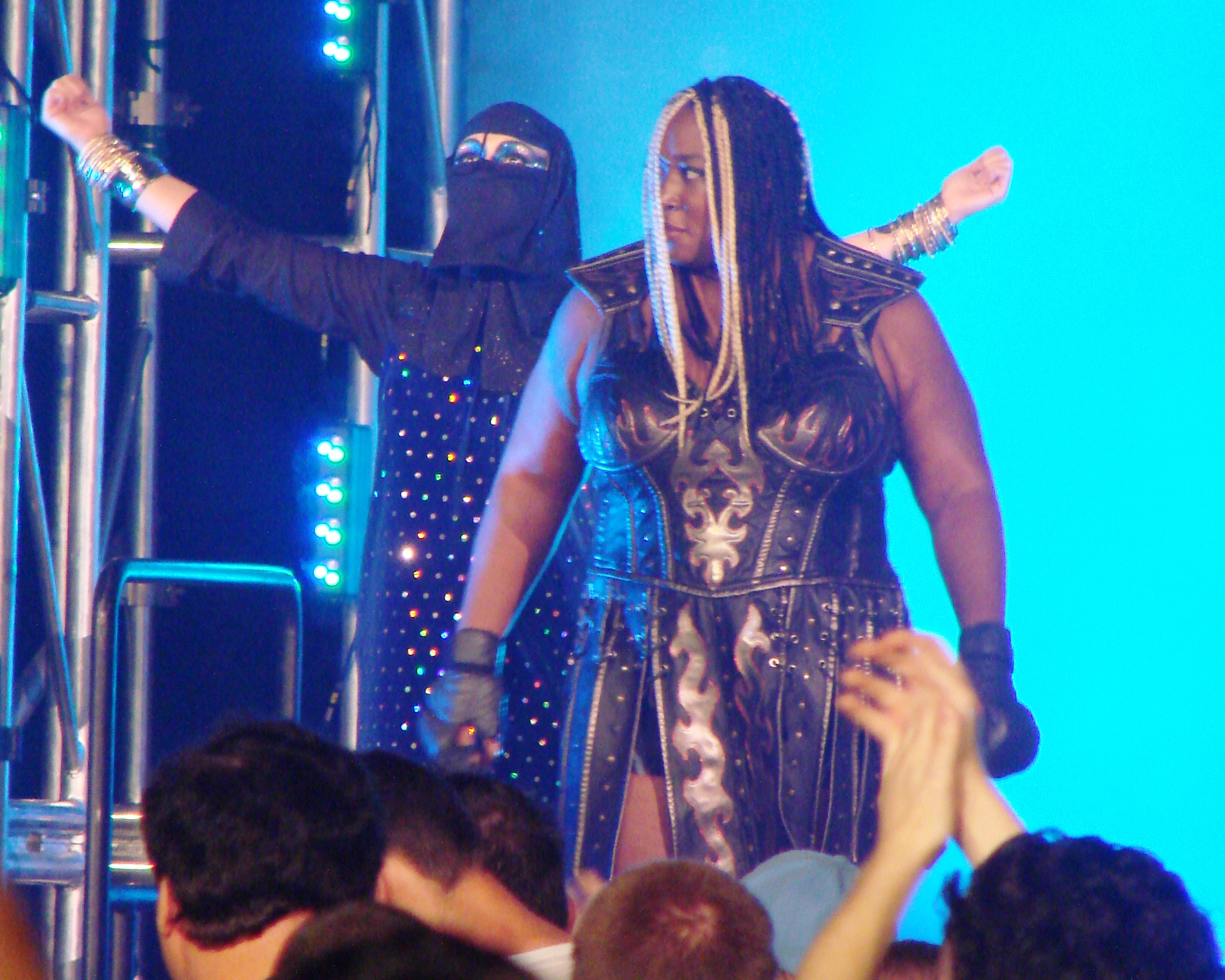
Anderson as Raisha Saeed (left), Awesome Kong's (right) manager

On the edition of January 10 of TNA Impact! Anderson made her Total Nonstop Action Wrestling (TNA) debut as an unknown woman wearing a niqāb, later named Raisha Saeed and billed from Syria. She was in Awesome Kong's corner when Kong defeated Gail Kim to win the TNA Women's Knockout Championship. Her first pay-per-view appearance with the company was again in Kong's corner at Against All Odds, distracting Kong's opponent ODB to help her retain the Knockout Championship. The situation with Kim and ODB intensified, leading to Anderson's first match as a competitor with the promotion. At TNA's all-steel cage event Lockdown, she and Kong took on Kim and ODB in a tag team match, where Saeed was pinned by ODB. On the edition of July 3, 2008 of Impact!, Saeed lost a match against newcomer Taylor Wilde which saw Wilde become number one contender for the Knockout Championship despite outside interference from Kong.

In September her costume became a focal point for angles as Saeed became a more regular in-ring performer. On September 4's Impact! ODB pinned her and then chased her backstage, coming out later with the burqa. Kong hit ODB in the back of the head while Saeed ran to reclaim her attire, her face masked by her hair at the time. Later that month Roxxi used a burqa to disguise herself as Saeed while Kong was facing newcomer Mercedes Steele. After the match Roxxi removed her disguise and attacked Kong with a steel chair, while Saeed appeared at the top of the entrance ramp bound in ropes (implying that she had been abducted by Roxxi prior to the match). Kong took revenge, pinning Roxxi in a tag effort also involving Saeed and Wilde, respectively, but Roxxi would make a return pin on Saeed in a singles match weeks later.

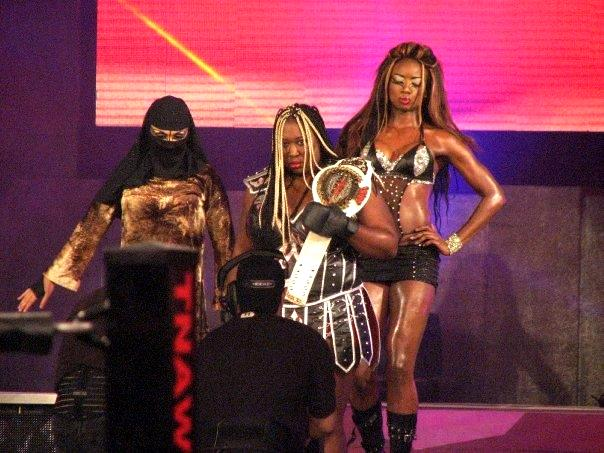
The Kongtourage

Kong and Saeed soon aligned themselves with Knockout Rhaka Khan. On the November 6 edition of Impact! Khan substituted for Roxxi as Wilde's tag team partner against Kong and Saeed in a match. In the event, the evil Khan turned against Wilde during the match to help Kong make the pinfall, but her good luck was short lived as Kong and Saeed, with Khan in their corner, lost to Wilde and Roxxi in a tag team match at Turning Point. Saeed lost to Christy Hemme on the November 27 edition of Impact!, allowing her to challenge for Kong's belt at Final Resolution but Saeed caused a disqualification, giving Hemme the win but retaining the belt for Kong. Through December Khan and Saeed were joined in their support for Kong by newcomer Sojourner Bolt; the group dubbed themselves the Kongtourage and took on ODB, Roxxi and Hemme in a losing effort during a Street Fight on January 15. Hemme was scheduled for a rematch at Genesis, however, she suffered a legitimate injury prior to the match and the Kongtourage impromptu number one contender match was made at the pay-per-view with ODB picking up the victory, teaming to gain a future title shot. The Kongtourage finally picked up a victory over ODB in a four-on-one handicap match on January 29's Impact!. The Kongtourage rapidly fell into disarray, though, when Bolt won a number one contender battle royal in early February, and a fortnight later Khan expressed her dissatisfaction with the group leading to a tag match that Khan and Bolt, who were being portrayed as fan favorites now, won. Saeed's attempts to interfere in the Knockouts Championship match at Destination X were unsuccessful but Kong still managed to retain her title.

Kong eventually dropped the title to Angelina Love at Lockdown 2009. After this loss, and with Kong unable to regain the championship, the team of Saeed and Kong were entered into the tournament to decide the inaugural Knockouts Tag Team Champions. In the first round, the team beat The Main Event Mafia's team of Sharmell and Traci Brooks. Saeed scored the pin over Brooks, tagging herself in after Kong had done much of the work causing Kong to stare angrily at Saeed. They were less successful in the following round, losing to the eventual tournament winning team of Taylor Wilde and Sarita. After inadvertently costing Kong the Knockout title at Bound for Glory, the two of them faced off on the edition of October 22 of Impact! with Saeed now being referred to as a former manager. Kong won the match and then Awesome Bombed her through the entrance stage. On September 9, 2023, Saeed made a one-night return at Impact 1000. She accompanied Awesome Kong on a 10-Knockout tag team match.

==== Alissa Flash (2009, 2011, 2013) ====
On the edition of May 1, 2008 of Impact!, Anderson appeared as her signature Cheerleader Melissa gimmick and defeated Daizee Haze in a singles match that was billed as a "try-out" for both women. However, she reappeared as Saeed later that night. At May 26, 2009 Impact! taping, Anderson wrestled as "Future Legend" Melissa Anderson in a dark match where she was defeated by Awesome Kong. Her television return occurred on the edition of July 16, 2009 of Impact! as she wrestled under the revised name of "Future Legend" Alissa Flash, losing to the debuting Sarita and attacking her afterward. Flash's losing streak continued in the first round of the Knockouts Tag Team Championship tournament where she and Daffney lost to Sarita and Taylor Wilde. As Flash, Anderson had a new outfit which included a streaks of make up around her eyes in tribute to Sherri Martel.

She picked up her first victory on the edition of September 17 of Impact! by defeating Cody Deaner in an intergender Lumberjack match. The win, though, was largely due to interference from all the other Knockouts who were lumberjacks. Frustrated at her lack of meaningful victories, Flash interrupted an interview with newcomer Hamada by voicing her frustration at the lack of fanfare her arrival in the company received in comparison to foreign Knockouts Sarita and Hamada. Flash then began to brawl with Hamada, throwing her down the bleachers of the empty arena. The two met weeks later on October 8 Impact! in an eight-woman elimination tag team match; when both were legal members in the ring they brawled out onto the floor until they were counted out and eliminated. The following week on Super Impact! the two met in a Falls Count Anywhere match which Flash lost after taking a moonsault from Hamada through a table. She finally scored an unassisted singles win on November 12 against Traci Brooks. After not being used by the company thereafter, Anderson requested her release which was granted on January 21, 2010. On March 14, 2011, at the tapings of the edition of March 17 of Impact!, Anderson, as Alissa Flash, made a one night return to TNA, unsuccessfully challenging Madison Rayne for the TNA Women's Knockout Championship as part of her open challenge series. On March 17, 2013, Anderson made another one night return to TNA to take part in the taping of the Knockout Knockdown pay-per-view, where she, as Alissa Flash, was defeated by Gail Kim.

=== Other promotions (2005–present) ===
As well as being a regular for APW, ChickFight, Shimmer and TNA, Melissa continues to tour the independent circuit working for a number of different promotions. She has had two stints in the National Wrestling Alliance affiliate Extreme Canadian Championship Wrestling. In her second run, during September 2005, she had a short feud with Nattie Neidhart, taking her on in a singles match where Neidhart won using her Sharpshooter after some interference from Belle Lovitz. Enraged by interference, Anderson formed an impromptu tag team with Tiffany called Girls Gone Wrestling (GGW) and pinned Nattie after an Air Raid Crash. The following day she lost a SuperGirls Championship match against the reigning Rebecca Knox due to some interference, this time from Scotty Mac. GGW teamed up again to take Mac and his partner Ladies Choice in a Men vs Women tag match that Anderson won with a pin.

Also in 2005 she wrestled at Givin Em The Bizness for Independent Wrestling Association Mid-South (IWA: Mid-South) in a six-way elimination match for the NWA Midwest Women's Championship against champion Ariel as well as MsChif, Mickie Knuckles, Sara Del Rey and eventual winner Daizee Haze. In March 2006 she wrestled a string of matches for Pure Wrestling Association winning their Elite Women's Championship in a match against 21st Century Fox and defending it successfully against her but losing it back to her in a three-way match, also including Misty Haven.

Anderson has participated in World Wrestling Entertainment (WWE) workouts with Ivory, Molly Holly and Jazz. She also had a tryout match on the edition of May 26, 2006 of WWE Heat. Wrestling under her birth name, Anderson fell to a Widow's Peak by Victoria in Las Vegas, Nevada.

On January 7, 2007, Anderson won Pro Wrestling World-1's inaugural Queen's Cup tournament. After beating Melissa Strips in the first round, she received a bye through to the final to face Allison Danger. During an autograph session, she attacked Danger to the point where she was said not to be able to compete, though Danger fought through her injury. By winning, Anderson earned herself a number one contendership for the AWA World Women's Championship.

In an attempt to build a strong women's division, Jersey All Pro Wrestling (JAPW) opened 2009 with January's Female Revolution. Under her Cheerleader gimmick, she beat Nikki Roxx and later appeared as Raisha Saeed also winning against Ariel. She appeared again in May losing a return match to Roxx but staying undefeated as Saeed against Daizee Haze. She was scheduled for a rematch with Roxx on November 16 but after Roxx pulled out she defeated Hailey Hatred to earn a match against Sara Del Rey for the JAPW Women's Championship. Anderson won the match by disqualification after Hatred interfered, leading to a no-disqualification Three Way match in January 2010 at Back Where It All Began for the title in which Anderson was pinned by Del Rey. Anderson met Del Rey later in 2010, on July 25, under the guise of her Raisha Saeed gimmick. It was during her Chikara debut in a tag team match, where she and Amazing Kong were defeated by Bruderschaft des Kreuzes (Haze and Del Rey).

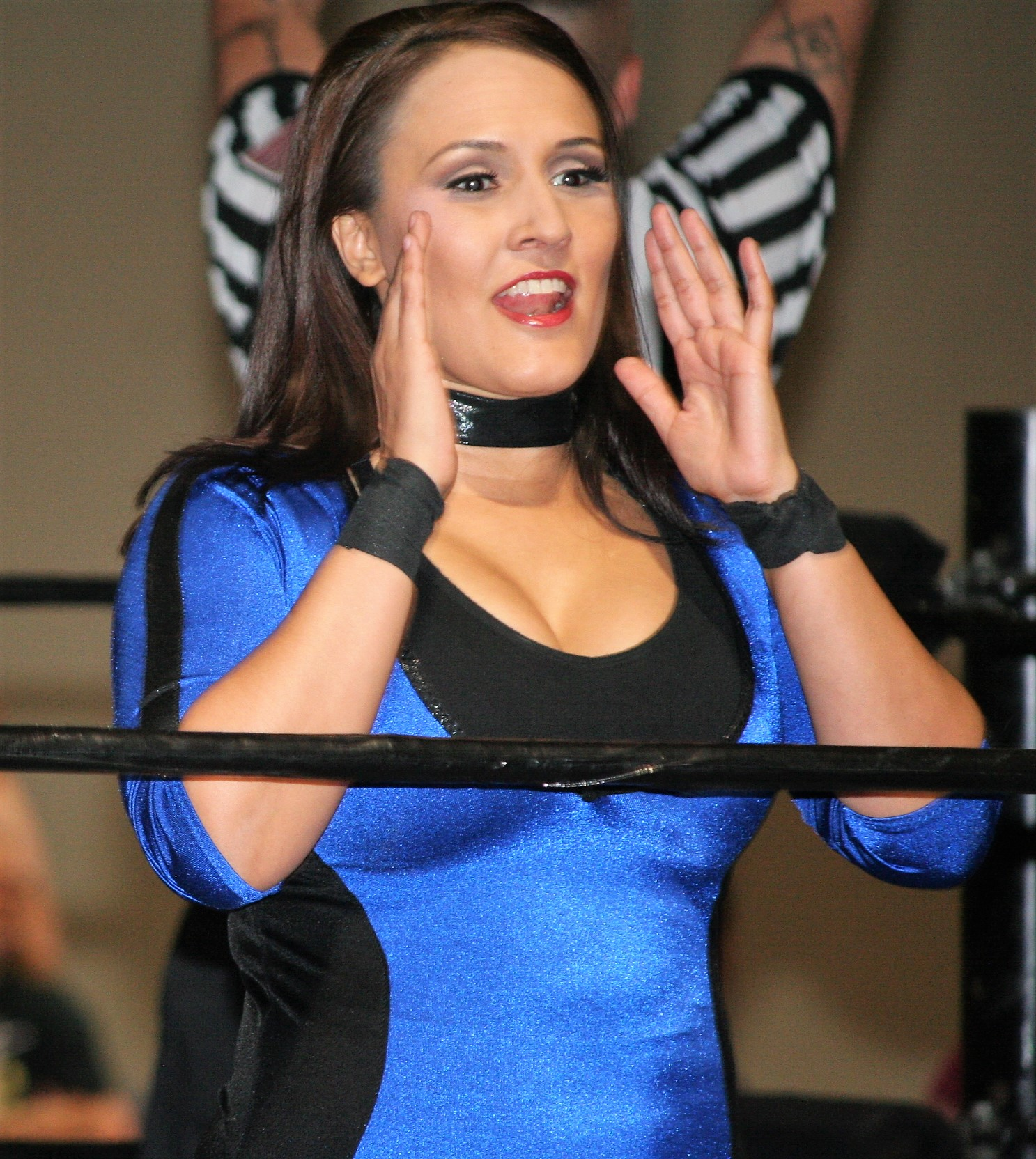
Anderson at an NCW Femmes Fatales show in October 2013

On July 3, Anderson appeared as Alissa Flash for the Texas-based promotion River City Wrestling (RCW). At Declaration of Champions, she wrestled RCW Champion Joey Spector in the main event to become the first female champion of the company. The result was however nullified on July 12, after RCW Commissioner Jeromy Sage announced that the contract for the title match stipulated that the length was supposed to be 15 minutes, but the match was 15 1/2 minutes long. A rematch was scheduled on August 7 with no time limits or disqualifications, Flash won the match and the championship. On May 5, Flash teamed with Darci Drake to defeat San Antonio's Most Wanted in a lumberjack match to win the RCW Tag Team Championship. They would hold the title for four months, before being defeated by Gulf Coast Connection (AJ Summers and Rudy Russo) on September 3. As a result of being pinned in the title match, Flash had to leave RCW for 90 days. On February 4, 2012, Flash became River City Wrestling's first female Triple Crown Champion, when she defeated Rick David for the RCW International Championship. She was stripped of the title on March 5, 2013. On August 10, Flash defeated Angelina Love to become the inaugural RCW Angels Division Champion.

In October 2010, Anderson began extending her profile internationally by making two appearances for Mexican promotion AAA, under her Alissa Flash ring name, picking up tag team victories over the Moreno sisters (Cynthia and Esther) and the Apache sisters (Faby and Mari). On November 5, 2011, she made her debut for All Japan Pro Wrestling in Taiwan, teaming with Black Bushi and Dark Dragon in a six-person tag team match, where they were defeated by Bushi, Makoto and Último Dragón. The following day, Melissa defeated Makoto in what was billed as the first ever women's wrestling match in Taiwan. In December 2011, Anderson took part in TNA's Indian promotion Ring Ka King, performing as both Alissa Flash and Raisha Saeed.

On March 16, 2014, Anderson, working under the ring name Melissa, returned to Japan to work for World Wonder Ring Stardom, unsuccessfully challenging Io Shirai for the World of Stardom Championship. From August 24 to September 23, Melissa took part in Stardom's 2014 5★Star GP. After two wins, one draw and two losses, she failed to advance to the finals of the tournament. During the stay, Melissa was also appointed the president of Stardom's newly established American branch. She would mainly be involved in booking foreigners for the promotion. She returned to the promotion on June 14, 2015. On July 11, Melissa teamed with Chelsea under the team name California Dolls to unsuccessfully challenge Thunder Rock (Io Shirai and Mayu Iwatani) for the Goddesses of Stardom Championship.

=== Lucha Underground (2015–2018) ===
On October 29, 2015, it was announced that Melissa will star in the El Rey program Lucha Underground and would be making her debut in the upcoming tapings for the promotion's second season. She made her debut on March 9, 2016, episode, under a mask and the ring name Mariposa, portraying Marty Martinez's sister.

== Personal life ==
Anderson's favorite opponents include Mariko Yoshida (who innovated the Air Raid Crash finishing move that Melissa herself also uses), Wesna and Tiffany. She won Attack of the Show!'s contest, "MySpace Girl of the Week", on September 6, 2006. She appeared on the show in person rather than the usual webcam format and went on to participate in later segments of the show.

== Championships and accomplishments ==
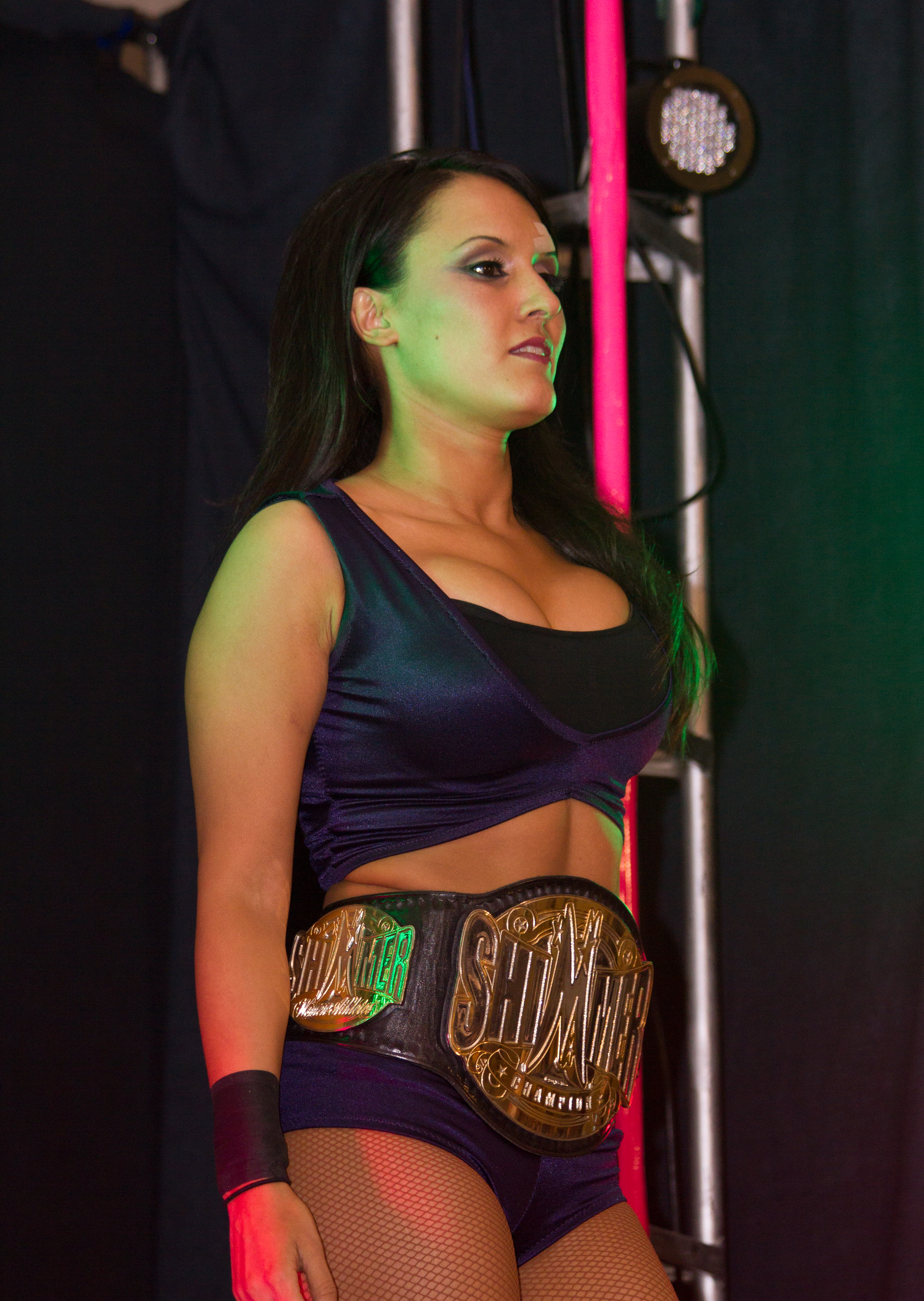
Melissa with the Shimmer Championship belt in April 2014

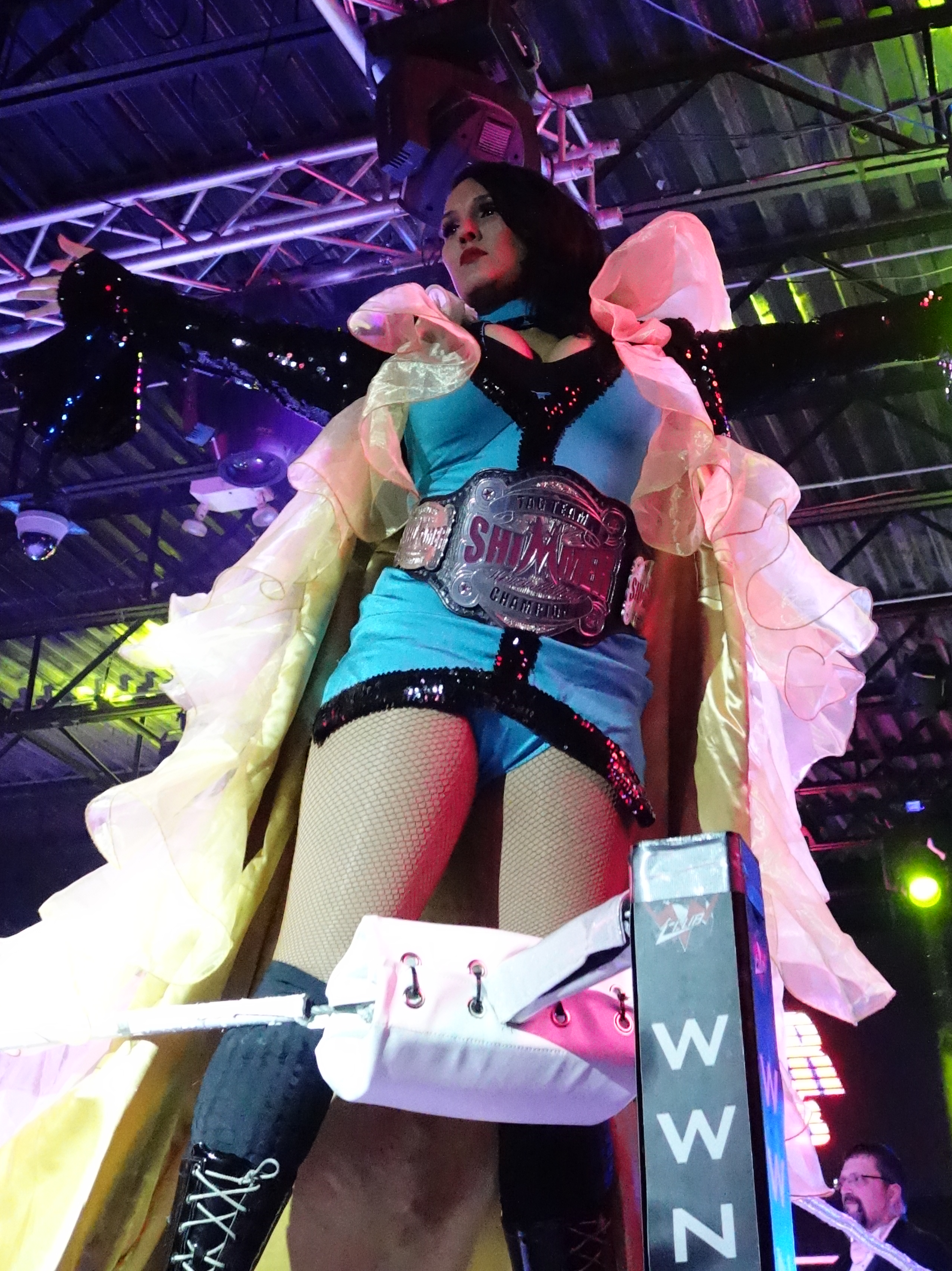
Melissa with the Shimmer Tag Team Championship belt in 2019

- All Pro Wrestling
  - APW Future Legend Championship (2 times, final)
- Alternative Wrestling Show
  - AWS Women's Championship (1 time)
- Cauliflower Alley Club
  - Future Legend Award (2004)
  - Women's (Active) Wrestling Award (2014)
- ChickFight
  - Transatlantic Women's Championship (1 time)
  - ChickFight V
  - ChickFight VII
- DDT Pro-Wrestling
  - Ironman Heavymetalweight Championship (1 time)
- Gold Rush Pro Wrestling
  - GRPW Lady Luck Championship (1 time)
  - Lady Luck Title Tournament (2015)
- Indie Wrestling Hall of Fame
  - Class of 2023
- Northern Championship Wrestling
  - Amazones and Titans (2011) – with Jay Phenomenon
- Pure Wrestling Association
  - PWA Elite Women's Championship (1 time)
- Pro Wrestling Illustrated
  - Ranked No. 1 of the top 50 female wrestlers in the PWI Female Top 50 in 2013
- Pro Wrestling Revolution
  - PWR Women's Championship (2 times)
- Pro Wrestling World-1
  - Queen's Cup (2007)
- River City Wrestling
  - RCW Angels Division Championship (1 time)
  - RCW Championship (1 time)
  - RCW International Championship (1 time)
  - RCW Phoenix Champion (1 Time)
  - RCW Tag Team Championship (1 time) – with Darci Drake
- Shimmer Women Athletes
  - Shimmer Championship (2 times)
  - Shimmer Tag Team Championship (1 time) – with Mercedes Martinez
- SoCal Uncensored
  - Southern California Match of the Year (2015) vs. Hudson Envy on May 30
- World Wonder Ring Stardom
  - 5★Star GP Award (1 time)
    - 5★Star GP Technique Award (2014)
