= Sara Del Rey =

American professional wrestler

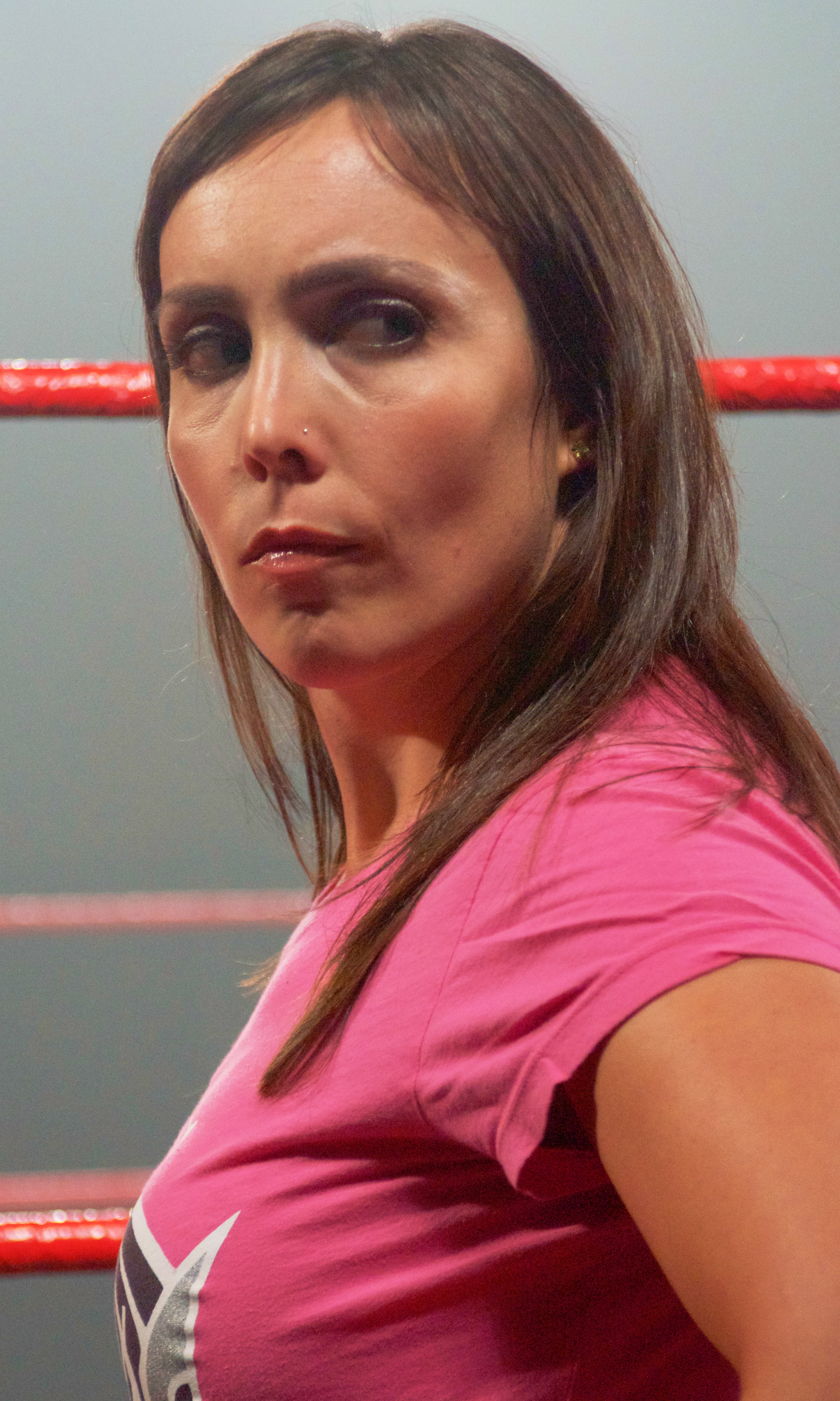
- Del Rey in 2011

Personal information
- Born: Sara Ann Amato; November 13, 1980 (age 45) Martinez, California, U.S.
- Life partner: Claudio Castagnoli (2011–present)

Professional wrestling career
- Ring name(s): The American Angel; Nic Grimes; Nikki; Sara Amato; Sara Del Rey
- Billed height: 5 ft 9 in (1.75 m)
- Billed weight: 160 lb (73 kg)
- Trained by: Donovan Morgan; Robert Thompson; Bryan Danielson; All Pro Wrestling; Inoki Dojo
- Debut: 2001
- Retired: September 2012

Sara Ann Amato (born November 13, 1980), better known by her ring name Sara Del Rey, is an American professional wrestling trainer and retired professional wrestler. She is signed to WWE as the assistant head coach of the WWE Performance Center and a producer for their developmental territory at NXT. She was a mainstay for Chikara, Ring of Honor (ROH) and Shimmer, but also appeared for many other independent promotions in the US, including IWA Mid-South and All Pro Wrestling, as well as Mexico's Lucha Libre Femenil. Del Rey also taped several matches, competing under a mask and using the name Nic Grimes, for the MTV promotion Wrestling Society X.

Del Rey was the inaugural Shimmer Champion and co-holder of the Shimmer Tag Team Championship with Courtney Rush, making her the promotion's first double champion. In 2012, she became the fourth woman to make it to Pro Wrestling Illustrated's list of top 500 wrestlers in the world.

== Early life ==
As a child, Amato considered herself a fan of professional wrestling, citing Hulk Hogan and The Ultimate Warrior as two of her favorites due to their high energy characters and matches. She did not watch it for several years, but became interested again during high school. Amato admits that in high school, she was "really shy and kind of awkward and scared of social situations", which made her doubt whether she would actually make it as a professional wrestler. She briefly attended college following her graduation from high school, but disliked it and decided to become a professional wrestler instead. She initially trained with All Pro Wrestling's boot camp, and was trained by Tommy Drake, Donovan Morgan, and Micheal Modest. In the beginning, Amato had to spend hours training, as wrestling did not come naturally to her. Tommy Drake was later interviewed, admitting Sara was not naturally talented and he didn't think she would make it, but he later said "I was so happy I was wrong, as she was a genuine person and the definition of a book that you don't judge the cover of. She worked her butt off to prove me and everyone else wrong, and that's why she deserves to be where she is". She later went on to train in Japan.

== Professional wrestling career ==
=== Japanese and Mexican promotions (2002–2007) ===
In 2002, Amato tried out for the Japanese promotion Arsion founded by Aja Kong, and she considers it a highlight of her career.

On February 15, 2005, she won Impact Zone Wrestling's Women's Championship by defeating Adrenelyn on an event in Japan. Later in 2005, she toured Japan again, and released a video that depicts six of her matches entitled "Sara Del Rey Japan Tour 2005". She also wrestled in Mexico, using the gimmick "The American Angel", in which she wore a wrestling mask. She was unmasked in a match in the Lucha Libre Femenil promotion on December 16, 2005. She later donned a mask once again as Nic Grimes, the storyline sister of Vic Grimes for Wrestling Society X.

=== Shimmer Women Athletes (2005–2012) ===
Del Rey debuted for Berwyn, Illinois–based Shimmer Women Athletes at their inaugural show in 2005, where she wrestled Mercedes Martinez to a twenty-minute time limit draw. At Volume 2, she won a four-way elimination match against Daizee Haze, Lacey and Martinez, by lastly eliminating Haze. On February 12, 2006, she was able to defeat Haze in the main event of Volume 3, and then Rain at Volume 4. In the main event of Volume 5, Del Rey pinned Mercedes Martinez in a singles match. Later in the night, The Minnesota Home Wrecking Crew challenged Martinez to a tag team match, and Del Rey agreed to be Martinez's partner. At Volume 6, Del Rey and Martinez were defeated by Rain and Lacey. On October 22, Del Rey defeated the debuting Nattie Neidhart. After the match, she was challenged by Martinez to a rematch at Volume 8, which Sara agreed to. In the main event of Volume 8, Del Rey lost to Martinez, and suffered her first singles loss in Shimmer.

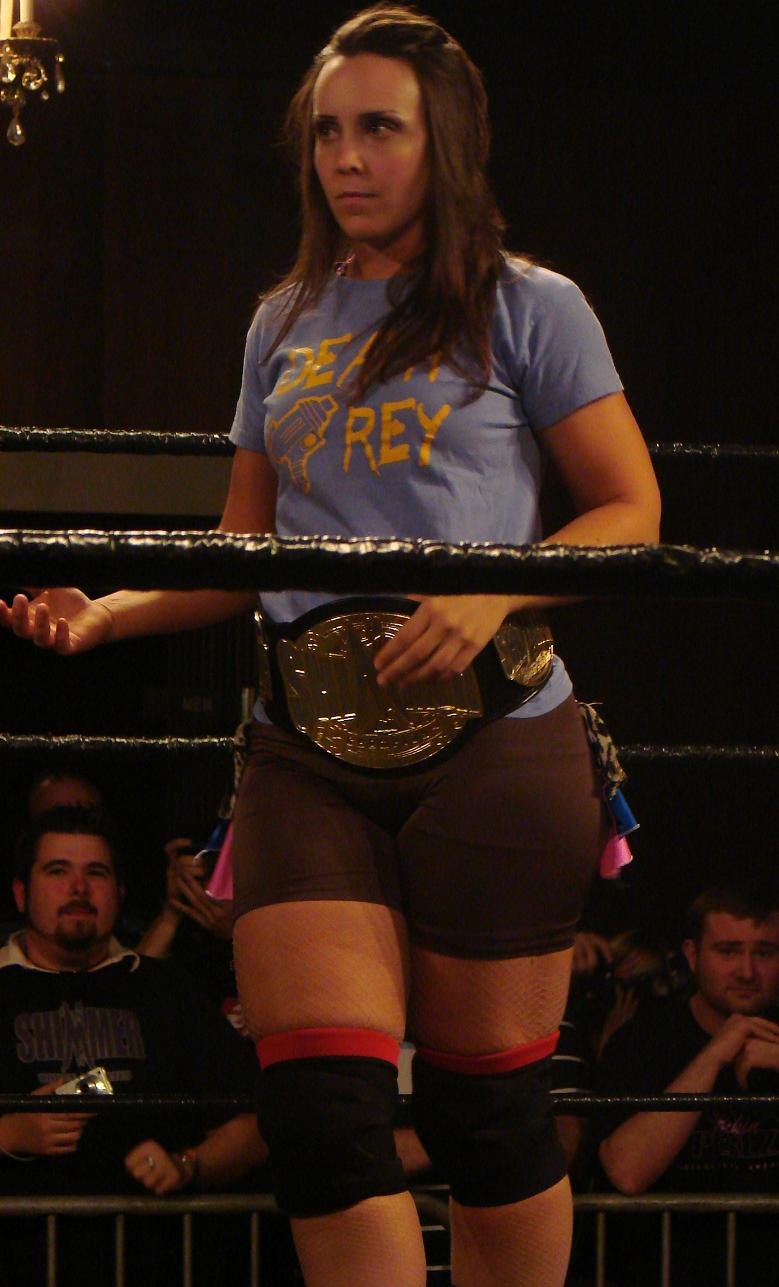
Sara Del Rey as the Shimmer Champion in October 2007

On April 7, 2007, Del Rey defeated both Cheerleader Melissa and Nikki Roxx in the main events of Volume 9 and Volume 10, leading her to the Shimmer Championship tournament. On June 1, Del Rey advanced to the semi-finals of the tournament by first eliminating Cindy Rogers, and then Alicia. At Volume 12, she defeated Sarah Stock, and went on to defeat Lacey in the finals to become the first ever Shimmer Champion. Later in the night, she teamed with Nikki Roxx to defeat the Minnesota Home Wrecking Crew. Del Rey made her first successful title defense against Lacey in a rematch at Volume 14. Del Rey defeated Amazing Kong at Volume 15, and Sarah Stock in a two out of three falls match at Volume 16. At Volume 17, Del Rey teamed up with Allison Danger in a losing effort to the team of MsChif and Cheerleader Melissa. At Volume 18, MsChif challenged Del Rey to a championship match, which Del Rey accepted. Later in the night, Del Rey lost the Shimmer Championship to MsChif, ending her reign at 329 days.

On July 5, 2008, Del Rey took part in a 21-woman number one contender's battle royal, but she was eliminated by Portuguese Princess Ariel. Del Rey then attacked Ariel, leading to a match between the two at Volume 19, which Del Rey won. At Volume 20, Del Rey defeated Serena Deeb. On October 19, Del Rey was challenged by Deeb to a rematch, which once again was won by Del Rey. At Volume 22, Del Rey was challenged once again by Deeb, but this time she did not accept. On May 2, 2009, Del Rey defeated Madison Eagles of the Pink Ladies. Later in the night, she and Amazing Kong attacked Shimmer Champion MsChif, only to be scared off by Cheerleader Melissa. At Volume 24, Del Rey teamed up with Amazing Kong to defeat MsChif and Melissa, becoming the number one contenders to the Shimmer Tag Team Championship. However, at Volume 26, Del Rey and Kong failed to capture the titles from defending champions Nevaeh and Ashley Lane after being disqualified. The duo proceeded to attack the champions after the match, but they were forced to leave the ring by Serena Deeb and Mercedes Martinez. Later that night, Del Rey and Kong defeated Deeb and Martinez.

On November 8, Del Rey defeated Jessie McKay. Later that night, she was disqualified in a match against Ayako Hamada, but Hamada ordered that the match be restarted, which Del Rey won. At Volume 33, Del Rey defeated Nevaeh. At Volume 34, she was defeated by Jessie McKay in a three-way match that also included Hamada. At Volume 35, Del Rey defeated Rachel Summerlyn, with help from Daffney. At Volume 36, Del Rey competed in an 8-woman tag team elimination match, but was eliminated by Hamada. On March 18, 2012, Del Rey and Courtney Rush defeated Hamada and Ayumi Kurihara, the Canadian NINJAs (Nicole Matthews and Portia Perez) and Regeneration X (Allison Danger and Leva Bates) to win the Shimmer Tag Team Championship, making Del Rey the first woman to have held both of Shimmer's championships. On July 7, Del Rey and Rush lost the titles to the Canadian NINJAs.

=== Chikara (2006–2012) ===
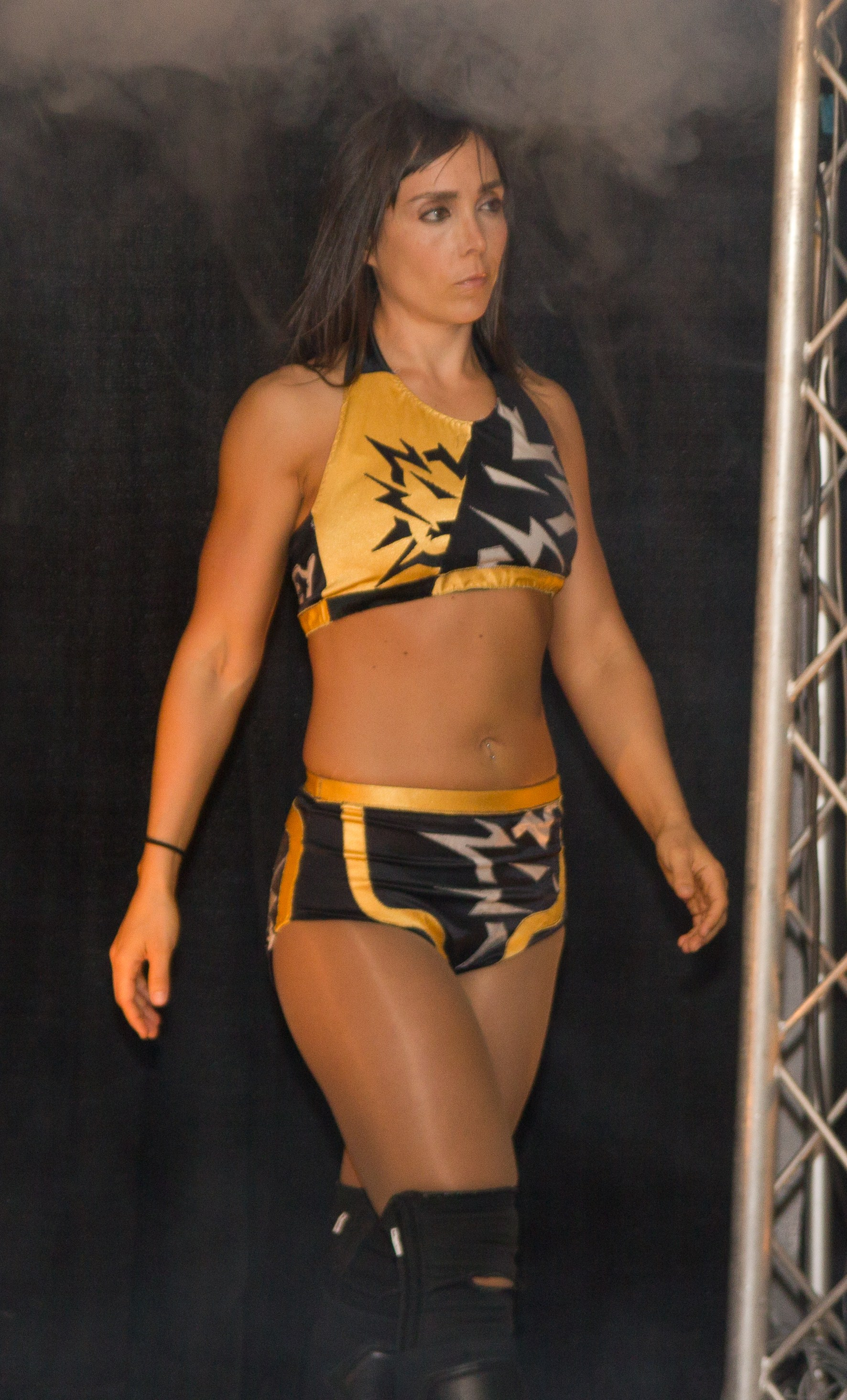
Sara Del Rey appearing for Chikara in 2012

Del Rey had been wrestling for Philadelphia, Pennsylvania–based Chikara since May 2006, mainly as a fan favorite. In November 2009, she was placed in her first major storyline in the company, when she turned into a villain and aligned herself with Claudio Castagnoli, Ares, Daizee Haze, Pinkie Sanchez, Tim Donst and Tursas to form the stable Bruderschaft des Kreuzes (BDK). While in BDK, Del Rey began regularly teaming with Haze, and together the two of them picked up victories over tag teams such as The Osirian Portal (Amasis and Ophidian), Los Ice Creams (El Hijo del Ice Cream and Ice Cream, Jr.), The Throwbacks (Dasher Hatfield and Sugar Dunkerton), Amazing Kong and Raisha Saeed, and Mike Quackenbush and Jigsaw. On September 19, 2010, Del Rey wrestled Japanese joshi legend Manami Toyota in only her second match in the United States, when she and Claudio Castagnoli were defeated in a tag team match by Toyota and Mike Quackenbush. On October 23, Del Rey represented BDK in the torneo cibernetico match, where they faced a team of Chikara originals, and was eliminated from the match by Eddie Kingston. The following day, Del Rey and Haze defeated the Super Smash Bros. (Player Uno and Player Dos) in a tag team match to pick up their third straight victory and, as the first all–female tag team, earn the right to challenge for the Chikara Campeonatos de Parejas (tag team championship), at the time held by their stablemates Ares and Claudio Castagnoli. However, Del Rey and Haze never got to cash in their points, as Ares and Castagnoli ordered them to defend them in a four-way elimination match on November 21, where they ended up being eliminated by Mike Quackenbush and Jigsaw and losing all of their points. In May 2011, Del Rey entered the 12 Large: Summit to determine the first ever Chikara Grand Champion. On July 31, Del Rey scored an upset win over BDK leader Claudio Castagnoli in a tournament match, after which both she and Haze were attacked by Castagnoli. On August 3, Del Rey announced her resignation from BDK. On October 7, Del Rey was eliminated from the 12 Large: Summit, when she was defeated by Mike Quackenbush. On November 12, Del Rey was part of Team Hallowicked in the eighth annual torneo cibernetico, facing a team of members of BDK and The Batiri. Del Rey eventually won the match by pinning her former stablemate Tim Donst. During December's JoshiMania weekend, Del Rey picked up wins over Japanese wrestlers Aja Kong, Tsubasa Kuragaki and Ayako Hamada. In early 2012, Del Rey began feuding with the Batiri stable, which culminated on June 2 at the Chikarasaurus Rex: How to Hatch a Dinosaur pay-per-view, where Del Rey and Saturyne defeated the Batiri by disqualification in a two-on-three handicap match. On July 28, Del Rey received her first shot at the Chikara Grand Championship, but was unable to dethrone the defending champion, Eddie Kingston. The following day, Del Rey was defeated by Icarus in her Chikara farewell match.

=== Ring of Honor (2006–2012) ===
In 2006, Del Rey feuded with Daizee Haze, whom she defeated on June 3, 2006 at a Ring of Honor (ROH) show. She was part of the team the Dangerous Angels, with Allison Danger, and the two competed as a team in ROH. One of the few female mainstays of ROH, Del Rey was a member of Sweet & Sour Inc., a faction of wrestlers managed by Larry Sweeney. During her time in the faction, she was paired with Chris Hero by Sweeney and dubbed the "Intergender Heavyweight Tag Team Champions", though in reality, the "titles" were never recognized by ROH. She walked out of the faction after Sweeney interrupted a match between her and Daizee Haze on the April 11 ROH show and berated her. On the next ROH show which took place the next day, Sweeney claimed, in storyline, that he was "grooming" Del Rey for World Wrestling Entertainment (WWE), and she responded by saying she was a wrestler and not a Diva. She returned as a "proud member" of Sweet & Sour Inc. at the May 9 ROH show. After Sweeney's departure from ROH, Del Rey followed Chris Hero and became a member of The Kings of Wrestling.

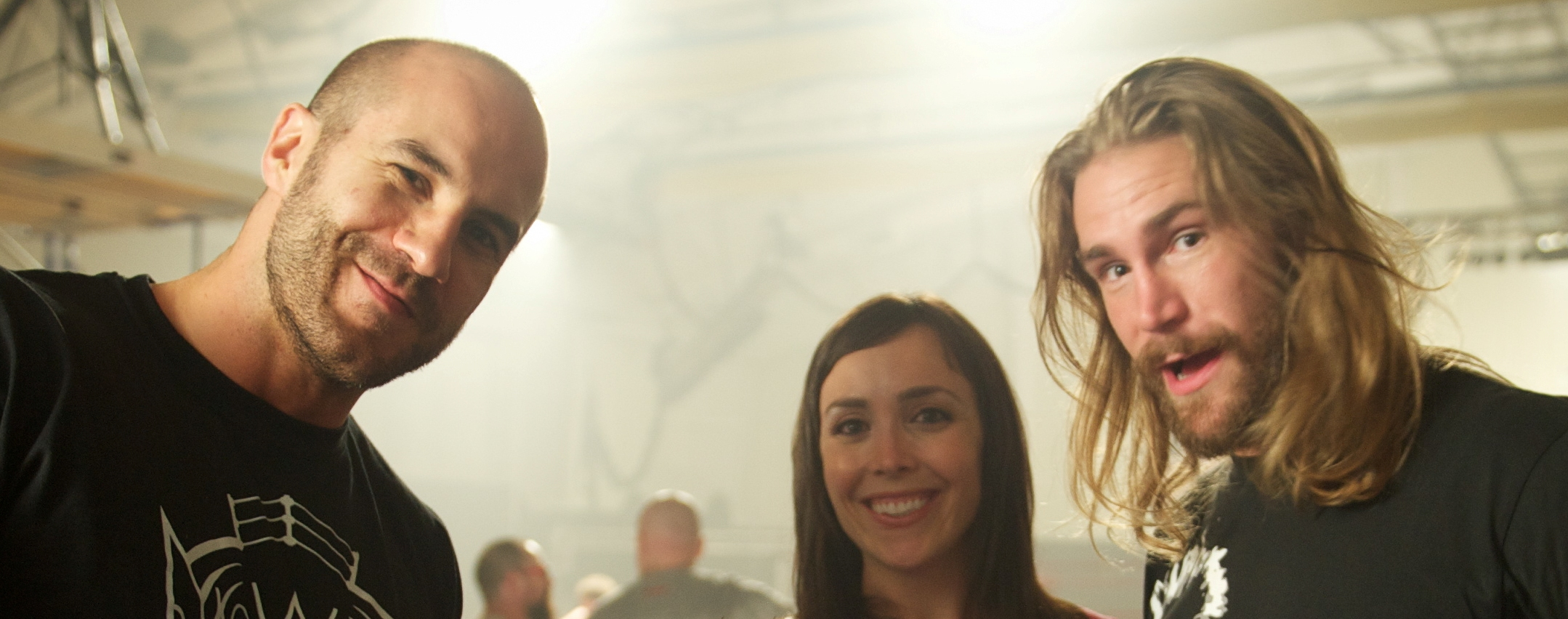
Left to right: Claudio Castagnoli, Sara Del Rey and Chris Hero as The Kings of Wrestling in 2011

In the second episode of Ring of Honor Wrestling on HDNet, Del Rey defeated Daizee Haze. As part of the fourth episode, she lost in a tag team match, along with Sassy Stephie, against Haze and Nevaeh. She also took part in a three-way non-title match against Haze and Shimmer Champion MsChif, which Mschif won. She also appeared in a match on the 17th episode, when she and MsChif defeated the team of Haze and Nevaeh. On September 28, 2009, Del Rey won a match against Nikki Roxx.

Del Rey returned at the June 29 tapings of Ring of Honor Wrestling, saving Adam Cole and Eddie Edwards from a beat down from Mike Bennett, Brutal Bob and Maria Kanellis. On August 11 at Boiling Point, Del Rey and Edwards defeated Bennett and Kanellis in a tag team match.

In 2020, Del Rey won an online tournament between several female wrestlers of ROH.

=== Jersey All Pro Wrestling (2009–2010) ===
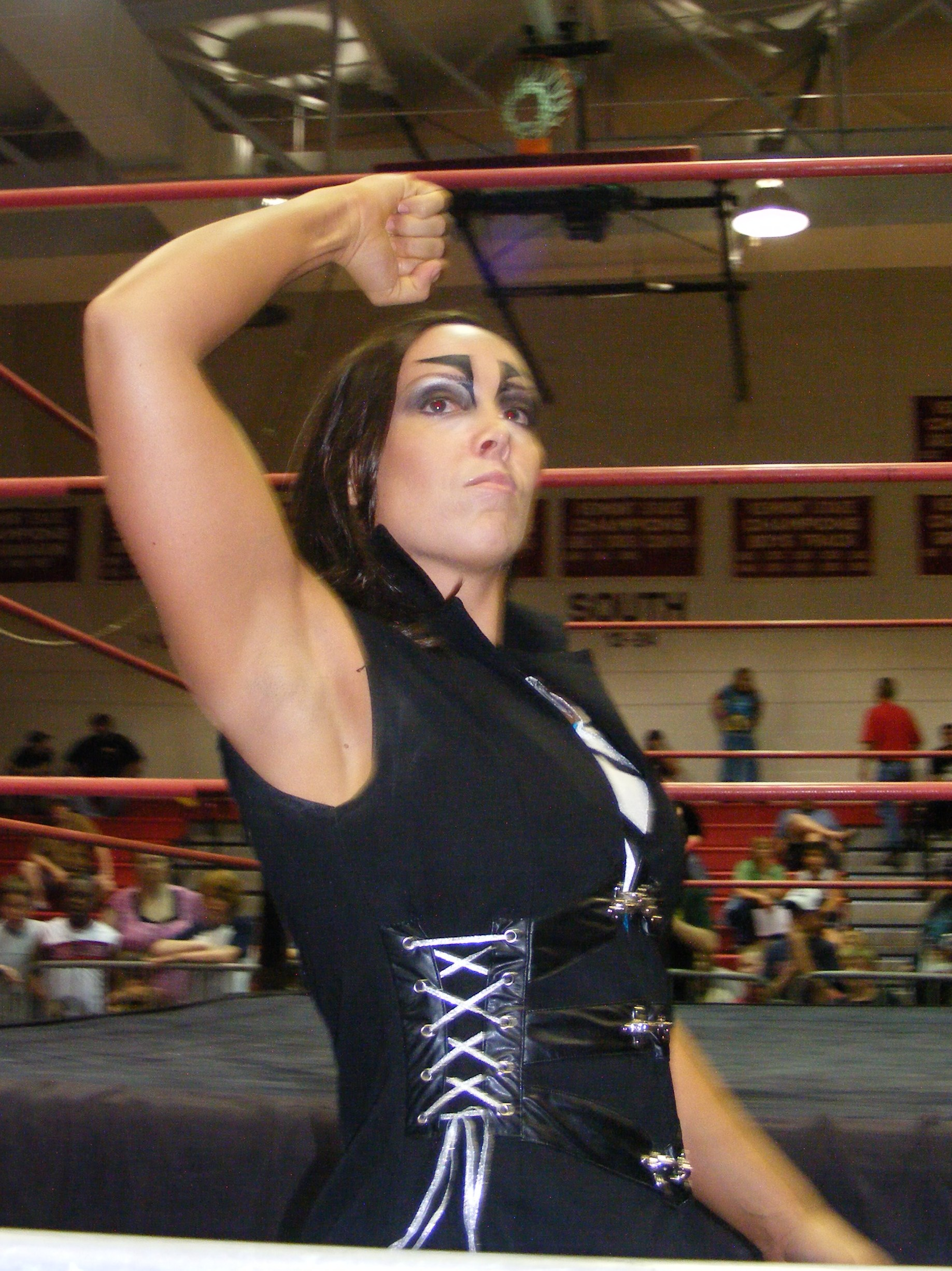
Del Rey in May 2009

Del Rey debuted for Jersey All Pro Wrestling (JAPW) at their very first show on January 10, 2009, where she defeated Daizee Haze. On the second show on May 9, she defeated Amazing Kong, and later in the night won a battle royal, becoming the number one contender to the inaugural JAPW Women's Championship. On June 27, she was able to defeat ODB in Jersey City, New Jersey to become the inaugural JAPW Women's Champion. She was also able to retain the title against Portia Perez at European Homicide on August 1. She made her second title defense against Hailey Hatred in Beachwood, New Jersey on September 12. At Halloween Hell, she squashed Roxie Cotton to make her third title defense. On November 13, Del Rey successfully defended the championship against Alissa Flash at a Total Nonstop Action Wrestling (TNA) house show in Wayne, New Jersey. The following day at JAPW Girl Power, Del Rey fought Cheerleader Melissa to a double disqualification, after Hailey Hatred attacked both Del Rey and Melissa. Later that night. it was announced that at the next JAPW show, the three women would face off in a three-way no disqualification match, with Del Rey's championship on the line. Del Rey made a successful title defense against Sumie Sakai at Season's Beatings. On January 9, 2010, Del Rey won the three-way no disqualification match, thus retaining the championship. On January 23, she defeated Madison Rayne at JAPW's 12th Anniversary Show to retain the championship. Del Rey continued to defend her title, and was able to defeat Hailey Hatred in a Falls Count Anywhere match at Wild Card, a JAPW show where the champions had to defend their titles against mystery opponents. She defended the title against Ayumi Kurihara at Old School on April 17, and against Annie Social at Notorious Thunder on May 22. On July 3, Del Rey wrestled at another TNA house show, losing to Angelina Love in a match for the number one contender-ship to the TNA Knockouts Championship. On November 20, she retained the championship against Mia Yim, and against LuFisto at the 13th Anniversary Show on December 11. After Del Rey signed with WWE in July 2012, the JAPW Women's Championship was declared vacant, ending her reign at 1,108 days.

=== NCW Femmes Fatales (2009–2010) ===
On September 5, 2009, Del Rey took part at the debut show of NCW Femmes Fatales, where she defeated Cherry Bomb. Later in the night, after LuFisto's match, she attacked the owner of the promotion and challenged her to a match at the next show. Del Rey took part in the tournament to determine the inaugural NCW FF Champion, but lost to LuFisto in the first round on June 5, 2010.

=== WWE (2012–present) ===
On July 9, 2012, it was reported that Del Rey had signed a contract with WWE. In September 2012, Del Rey became the first ever female trainer in WWE's developmental territory NXT, based at the WWE Performance Center in Orlando, Florida. She is currently being referred to by her real name.

On May 19, 2015, Amato was promoted to NXT assistant head coach by WWE, following the resignation of Bill DeMott. She is currently working side by side with the current NXT head coach, Matt Bloom.

== Personal life ==
Amato has cited Aja Kong as her inspiration.

Amato is in a long-term relationship with wrestler Claudio Castagnoli.

== Championships and accomplishments ==
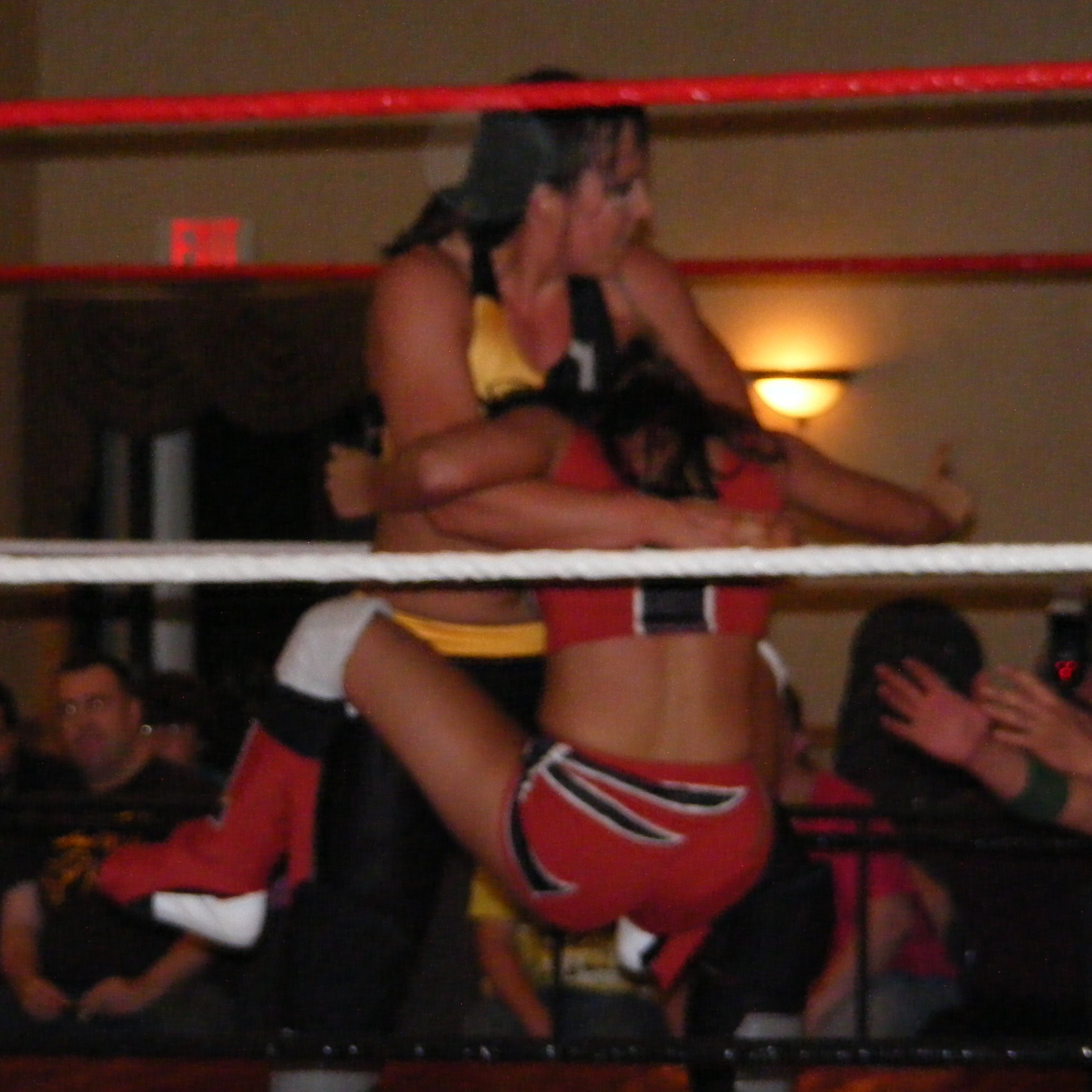
Sara Del Rey preparing to perform the Royal Butterfly on Alexxus in 2010.

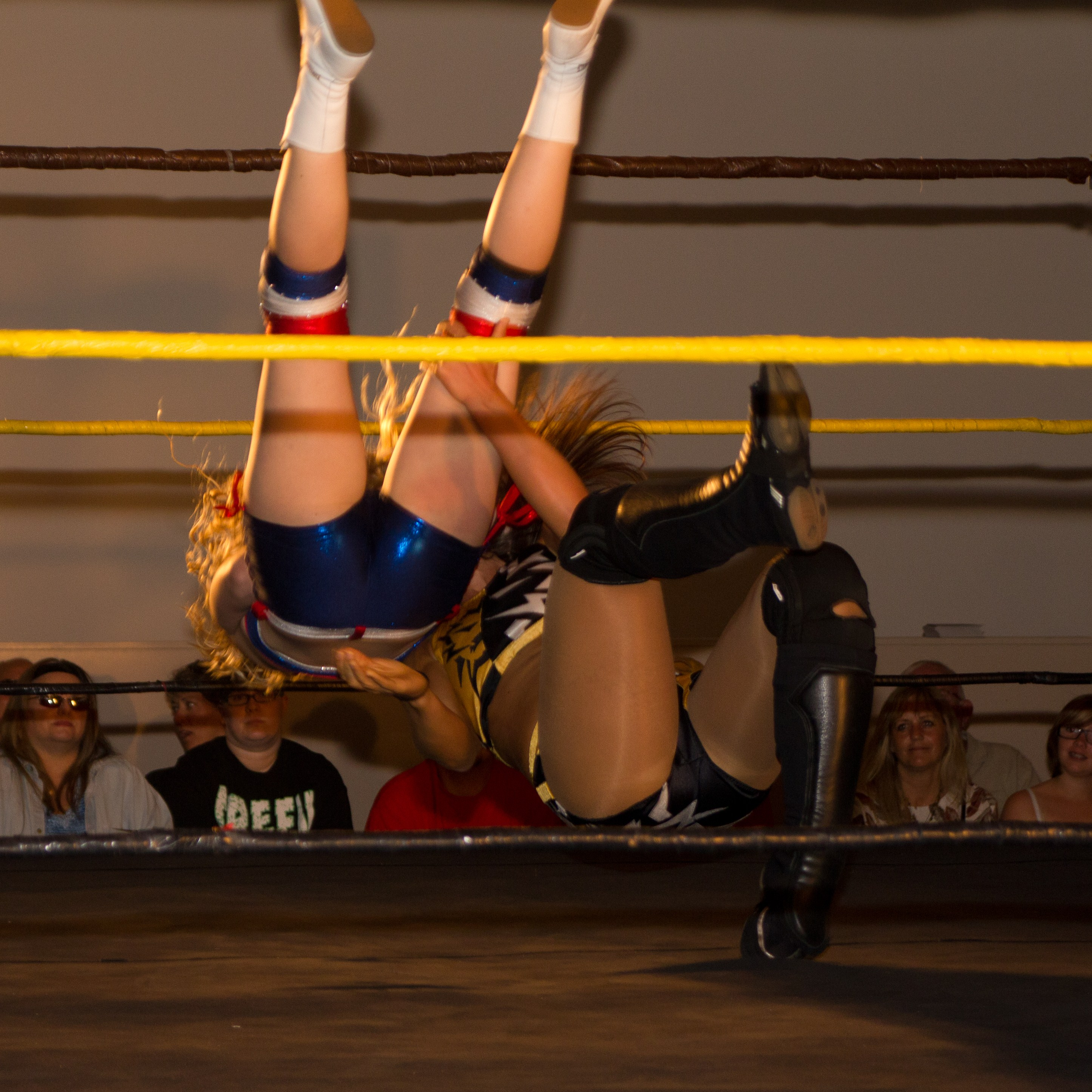
Sara Del Rey executing a belly-to-back suplex against Leah Von Dutch in 2011.

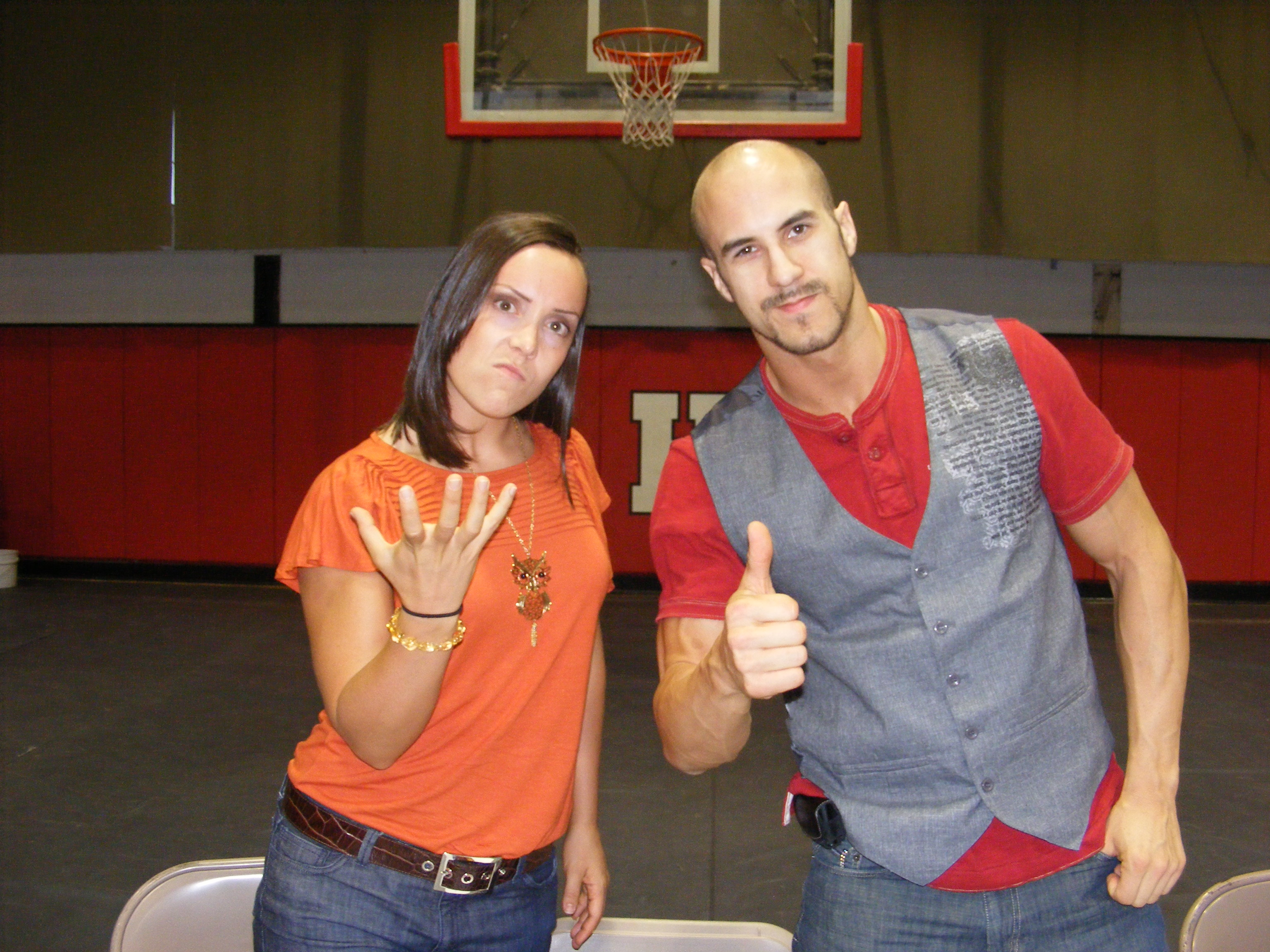
Sara Del Rey with Claudio Castagnoli in 2009.

- Canadian Wrestling Revolution
  - CWR Women's Championship (1 time)
- Chikara
  - Torneo Cibernetico (2011)
- Impact Zone Wrestling
  - IZW Women's Championship (1 time)
- Jersey All Pro Wrestling
  - JAPW Women's Championship (1 time)
- Ohio Championship Wrestling
  - OCW Women's Championship (1 time)
- Pro Wrestling Illustrated
  - Ranked No. 4 of the top 50 female wrestlers in the PWI Female 50 in 2012
  - Ranked No. 430 of the top 500 wrestlers in the PWI 500 in 2012
- Pro Wrestling WORLD-1
  - SUN Championship (1 time)
- Ring of Honor
  - Undisputed World Intergender Heavyweight Tag Team Championship (1 time) – with Chris Hero^{[a]}
  - ROH Year-End Award (1 time)
    - Shimmer Wrestler of the Year (2007)
- Remix Pro Wrestling
  - RPW Women's Championship (1 time)
- Shimmer Women Athletes
  - Shimmer Championship (1 time, inaugural)
  - Shimmer Tag Team Championship (1 time) – with Courtney Rush

== Notes ==
^{a} Championship not officially recognized by Ring of Honor.
