= Indie Wrestling Hall of Fame =

Professional wrestling hall of fame

- Formation: November 19, 2021 (4 years ago)
- Members: 20 total inductees

The Indie Wrestling Hall of Fame is a hall of fame that honors professional wrestlers and wrestling personalities who contributed to the independent circuit, founded by Game Changer Wrestling (GCW) and the Orange Crush magazine.

== History ==
On November 19, 2021, GCW announced the establishment of the Indie Wrestling Hall of Fame. The inaugural ceremony took place on January 22, 2022, at The Cutting Room in New York City.

In 2024, Sabu didn't attend the ceremony; Sabu later accepted his Hall of Fame plaque in 2025.

== Inductees ==
=== Class of 2022 ===
Image	Ring name (Birth name)	Inducted by
	Dave Prazak	CM Punk
	Jerry Lynn (Jeremy Lynn)	Sean Waltman
	Homicide (Nelson Erazo)	Chris Dickinson
	LuFisto (Genevieve Goulet)	Lenny Leonard
—N/a	Ruckus (Claude Marrow Jr.)	Sonjay Dutt
	Tracy Smothers	Spyder Nate Webb

=== Class of 2023 ===
Image	Ring name (Birth name)	Inducted by
	Cheerleader Melissa (Melissa Anderson)	Dave Prazak
	Christopher Daniels (Christopher Covell)	Frankie Kazarian
	Excalibur (Marc Letzmann)	Orange Cassidy
	Jimmy Jacobs (Christopher Scoville)	Alex Shelley
—N/a	Michael Modest (Michael Cariglio)	Barry W. Blaustein
	Paul London	Rick Bassman

=== Class of 2024 ===
Image	Ring name (Birth name)	Inducted by
	Trent Acid (Michael Verdi)	Johnny Kashmere
—N/a	Kevin "Whack Packer" Hogan	Emil Jay
	Steve Corino	Colby Corino
	Sabu (Terrance Brunk)	N/A (Note: Sabu did not appear at the induction ceremony.)
	Mercedes Martinez (Jazmin Benitez)	Lexie Fyfe
	Eddie Gilbert (Thomas Gilbert Jr.)	Missy Hyatt
	The Briscoes (Mark Briscoe and Jay Briscoe) (Mark Pugh and Jamin Pugh)	Emil Jay

=== Class of 2025 ===
Image	Ring name (Birth name)	Inducted by
	Amazing Red (Jonathan Figueroa)	N/A (Note: No induction ceremony was held in 2025, but Red was presented his plaque by Homicide on January 19, 2025 at GCW's The People vs. GCW event.)

=== Class of 2026 ===
Image	Ring name (Birth name)	Inducted by
	Crowbar (Christopher Ford)	
