= LuFisto =

Canadian professional wrestler

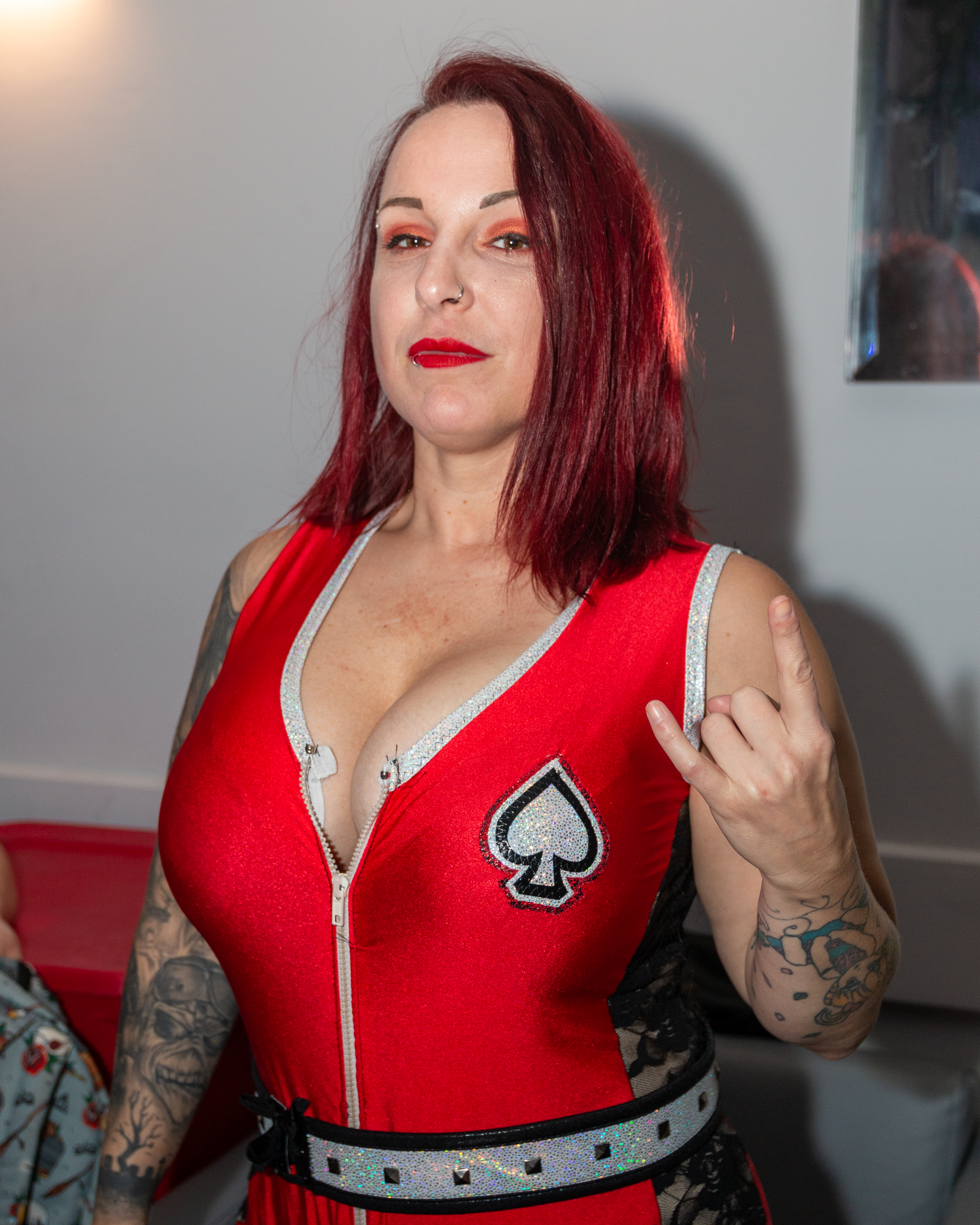
- LuFisto in 2019

Personal information
- Born: Genevieve Goulet; February 15, 1980 (age 46) Sorel-Tracy, Quebec, Canada

Professional wrestling career
- Ring name(s): Lucifer; Lucy Fer; LuFisto; Luscious Lucy; Precious Lucie; Precious Lucy; Super Hardcore Anime
- Billed height: 5 ft 2 in (1.57 m)
- Billed weight: 170 lb (77 kg)
- Billed from: Montreal, Japan; Tokyo, Japan
- Trained by: Eric Laroche; Patrick Lewis; Yves Millette
- Debut: 1997

Genevieve Goulet (born February 15, 1980), better known by the ring name LuFisto, is a Canadian professional wrestler from Quebec. She made her debut in 1997 and has competed on the independent circuit, as well as for promotions including Shimmer Women Athletes.

== Professional wrestling career ==
=== Independent circuit (1997–present) ===
LuFisto began training when she was 17 years old in her hometown of Sorel-Tracy, Quebec. On June 23, 1997, she made her debut in St-Leonard-d'Aston, Quebec, under the ring nameLucifer. She then moved to Montreal where she joined RWR and Northern Championship Wrestling (NCW). Her first trip to the States was in 1998, wrestling for Eastern Township Wrestling Association, where she modified her name to Lucy Fer.

In late 1998, she joined the Eastern Wrestling Alliance under the name Luscious Lucy as "Centerfold" Steve Ramsey's valet. She also began appearing at Green Mountain Wrestling shows in Vermont at this point. By mid-1999, working for International Wrestling 2000 in Quebec, The Mountie Jacques Rougeau changed her name to Precious Lucy. At EWA, she was teaming with Mark "Jaguar" Nugera and manager Joshua Shea to form Partners in Crime in many mixed gender tag-team and singles bouts. Precious Lucy also became the first female in Quebec to win a male championship at ICW, defeating Serge Proulx for the ICW Provincial Championship. This is also where she developed her hardcore style.

In 2002, under the ring name LuFisto, she was booked to appear in the main event of Blood, Sweat N' Ears in a match featuring hardcore wrestler Bloody Bill Skullion. The Ontario Athletics Commission, citing a regulation that prevented women and men from wrestling each other, threatened to withdraw the license for the show. This essentially banned LuFisto from wrestling in Ontario. She lodged a complaint with the Ontario Human Rights Commission. On February 26, 2006, the OHRC informed LuFisto that they had convinced the OAC to drop the regulation. The OAC subsequently dropped the vast majority of the regulations affecting professional wrestling in Ontario, a move which removed a great deal of the bureaucracy stifling independent wrestling in the province. LuFisto then worked primarily for National Wrestling Alliance's NWA Quebec Pro Wrestling promotion, where she is head trainer (along with Dru Onyx) of their wrestling school, Onyx and LuFisto's Torture Chamber.

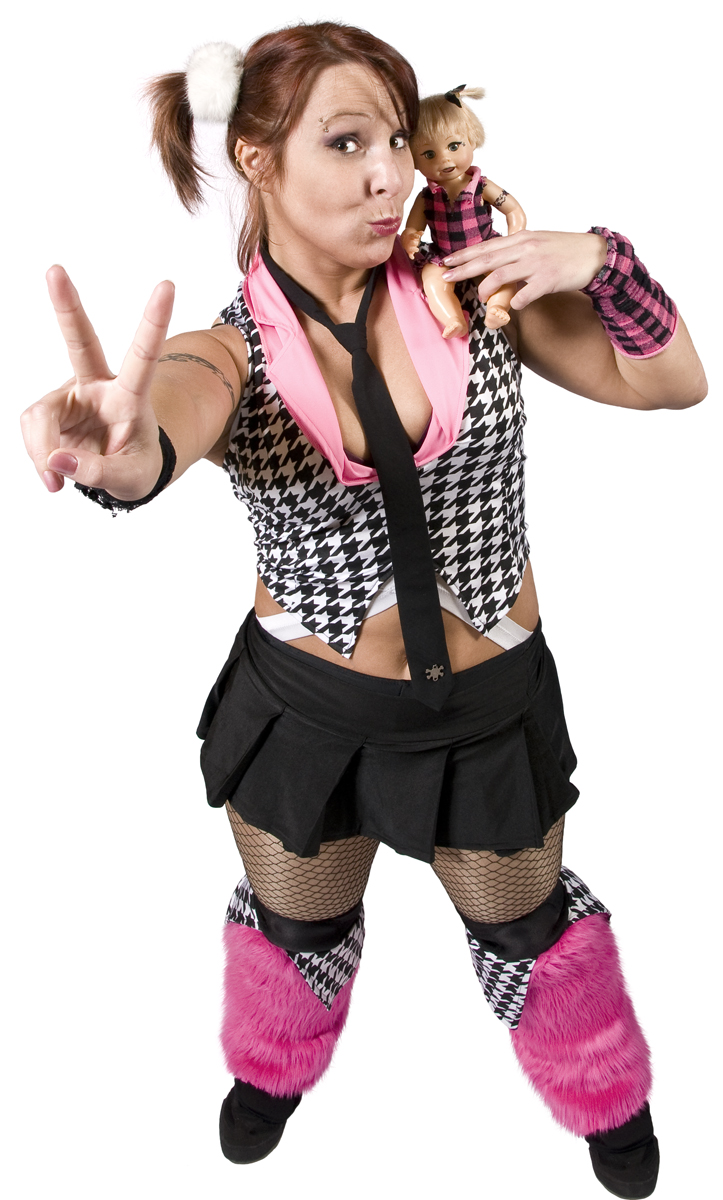
LuFisto in 2009

LuFisto also worked for Combat Zone Wrestling, where, on August 12, 2006, in Philadelphia, she became the first ever female CZW Iron Man Champion, pinning Kevin Steen to win the title. On October 29, 2006, she won the Stranglehold Wrestling Death Match Tournament, the first deathmatch tournament in Canada. In the first round, she defeated the Juggulator; in the second round, she defeated Skullion in a lighttube match, and she defeated Necro Butcher in the finals to win the tournament. On December 9, after a tag match at the CZW Cage of Death event, she became the first female ever to wrestle inside of the Cage of Death match when she added herself in the last minute in a match that also involved Zandig, Nick Gage, and Lobo. Gage would go on to win the match by pinning Zandig.

On January 8, 2007, however, she announced on her web site a possible retirement due to a back problem and that she would be forfeiting the CZW Iron Man Championship. She made her first appearance in a wrestling ring since her injury on April 13, 2007, for Association de Lutte Féminine (ALF) in Montreal, as the special referee in a match for the ALF Championship between champion Stefany Sinclair and Kacey Diamond. On September 22, 2007, LuFisto made her return to IWS at Blood, Sweat and Beers in which she lost a match to Damian.

On October 27, 2007, LuFisto entered IWA Mid-South's 2007 Queen of the Deathmatch Tournament, where she defeated Mickie Knuckles to win the title of Queen of the Deathmatch. She has since returned to Combat Zone Wrestling. On September 12, 2008, she won the vacant ALF Championship by defeating Kacey Diamond.

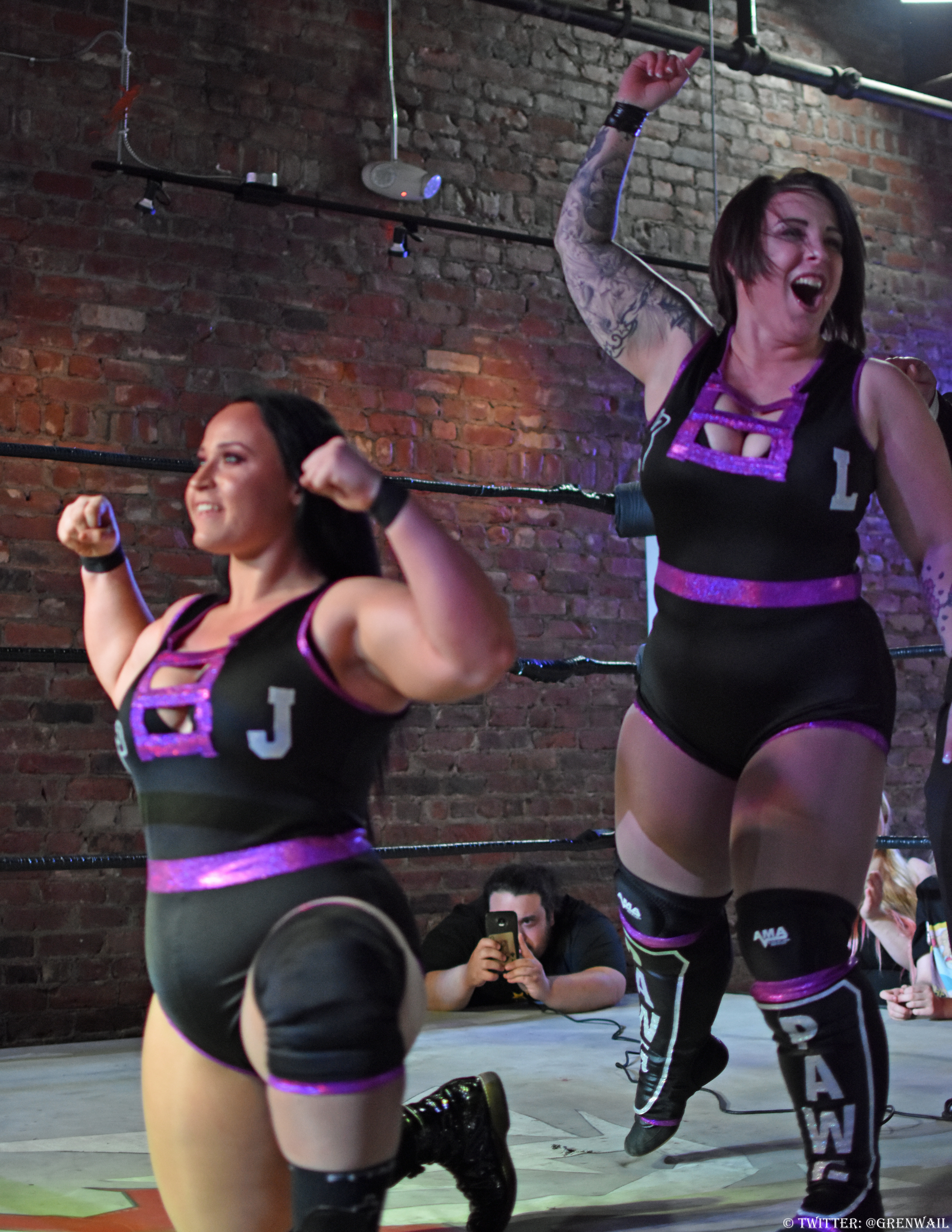
LuFisto and Jordynne Grace formed a duo known as "Team PAWG" in 2017

Throughout 2017 and 2018, LuFisto began tag teaming alongside Jordynne Grace as "Team PAWG" in a number of Independent promotions, primarily Beyond Wrestling.

=== Shimmer Women Athletes (2006–2021) ===
LuFisto debuted in Shimmer Women Athletes on October 24, 2006, in Berwyn, Illinois. She lost her first match to Mercedes Martinez, but came back and won her second match against Allison Danger. On July 5, 2008, she returned to Shimmer at the tapings of Volumes 19 and 20, defeating Rain on Volume 19 and losing to Cheerleader Melissa in a match that earned a standing ovation from the audience on Volume 20. On October 19, 2008, she teamed with Jennifer Blake as the Suicide Blondes to take part in the Shimmer Tag Team Championship Gauntlet Match. They were able to eliminate the Canadian NINJAs of Portia Perez and Nicole Matthews but came up short against The International Home Wrecking Crew of Rain and Jetta. As part of Volume 22, LuFisto was able to defeat Wesna Busic in an International Wildcard Dream Match.

She returned to Shimmer at the tapings of Volume 23, where she defeated the debuting Kellie Skater. Later in the night, she lost a rematch to Wesna after interference from her manager Annie Social. She came back victorious over Amber O'Neal, but she lost the chance to become Shimmer Champion against MsChif as part of Volume 26. On Volume 27, she had a number one contender's match with Amazing Kong, but both of them were counted out so they were both declared #1 contenders. As part of the main event of Volume 28, LuFisto lost a three-way elimination match with Amazing Kong and the eventual winner MsChif.

=== nCw Femmes Fatales (2009–present) ===
In early June 2009, the birth of a new all-female Canadian promotion, nCw Femmes Fatales, administered by LuFisto and Stephane Bruyere (the former booker of ALF) was announced. On September 5, LuFisto defeated Cheerleader Melissa in the main event of the inaugural show, making their record in singles competition 1–1. After the match, Sara Del Rey brutally attacked LuFisto. The two of them were scheduled to face each other at the second show on February 6, 2010. However, Del Rey was booked for a Ring of Honor Wrestling taping that same day, and when her replacement Ayako Hamada no-showed the event, LuFisto took on Cat Power instead. Power defeated LuFisto via disqualification after the referee caught LuFisto holding a steel chair, thrown to her by Power behind the referee's back. Later in the evening, the team of LuFisto and Cheerleader Melissa defeated Cat Power and Kalamity in a tag team match.

On April 17, 2010, LuFisto suffered a stroke after a match for NCW. LuFisto, who has a family history of heart problems, decided to continue her career, after going through some tests. LuFisto made her return to the ring on June 5, defeating Sara Del Rey in the first round of a tournament to determine the first ever nCw Femmes Fatales Champion. On October 23, 2010, LuFisto first defeated Kalamity in the semifinals and then Portia Perez in the finals of the tournament to become the first nCw Femmes Fatales Champion. She would go on to lose the title to Kalamity on October 8, 2011. On April 4, 2015, LuFisto defeated nCw Femme Fatales Champion Courtney Rush and Saraya Knight to win the title for second time. On August 1, 2015, LuFisto lost the title to Jessika Black in a 3-Way match also involving Stacy Thibault.

=== Mexico (2012–2013) ===
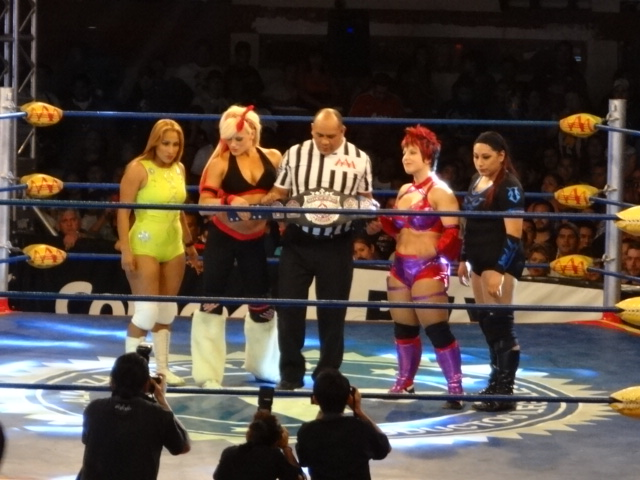
LuFisto (second from right) posing with the other competitors before the tournament final at Rey de Reyes

On February 19, 2012, LuFisto made her debut for the Mexican promotion Original Pro-Lucha, defeating La Vaquerita to win the Lucha POP Women's Championship. On February 21, 2013, Lucha Libre AAA World Wide (AAA) announced that LuFisto had signed with the promotion. She made her debut on March 1, defeating Cynthia Moreno to advance to the finals of a tournament for the AAA Reina de Reinas Championship. On March 17 at Rey de Reyes, LuFisto was defeated by Faby Apache in a four-way elimination tournament final, which also included Mari Apache and Taya.

=== Women Superstars Uncensored (2012–present) ===
LuFisto made her debut in Women Superstars Uncensored after the announcement of a working relationship between WSU and NCW Femmes Fatales. This saw LuFisto and NCW Femmes Fatales Champion Kalamity debut with WSU in June. LuFisto's first match in WSU was a win at the fifth annual Uncensored Rumble on June 16, 2012, against Leva Bates. At Full Steam Ahead in October of that year, LuFisto faced off against one of her greatest rivals in Mercedes Martinez. The two wrestled to a thirty-minute time limit draw. After the match, it was announced the two would renew their rivalry up in Canada in November, this time in a Cage, at NCW Femmes Fatales X. In February at WSU An Ultraviolent Affair, LuFisto and Martinez squared off once more in a Falls Count Anywhere match to determine the number one contender for the WSU Championship. LuFisto defeated Martinez and was deemed the new number one contender to Jessicka Havok's WSU Championship. Due to Havok being stripped of the title, she defeated Athena at the WSU Queen and King of the Ring event on May 10 to become the champion. She lost the title in May 2015 to Cherry Bomb.

=== Shine Wrestling (2013–present) ===
LuFisto made her debut in Shine Wrestling at Shine 7 on February 22, 2013, in a losing effort to Ivelisse Vélez after an outside distraction by Made in Sin (Allysin Kay and Taylor Made). On July 12, at Shine 11, LuFisto participated in a tournament to crown the inaugural Shine Champion, however, was eliminated after losing to Rain.

LuFisto made her return to Shine after two years on September 4, 2015, at Shine 29, where she lost to Jessicka Havok.

On January 13, 2017, at Shine 40, Lufisto won the Shine Championship in a triple threat match against Allysin Kay and Mercedes Martinez.

LuFisto vacated the Shine Championship on June 26, 2018, for health reasons.

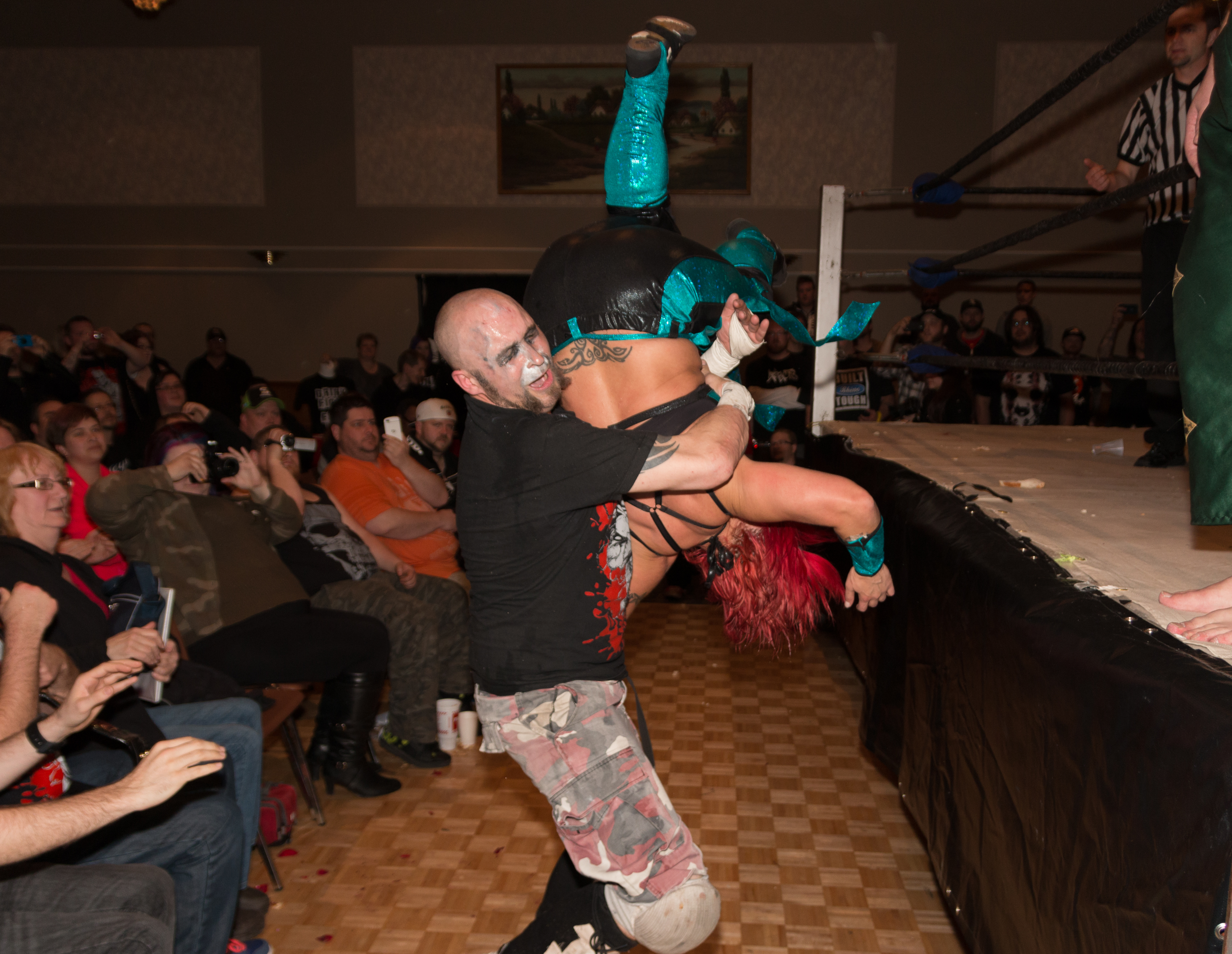
LuFisto performing a somersault senton onto Warhed

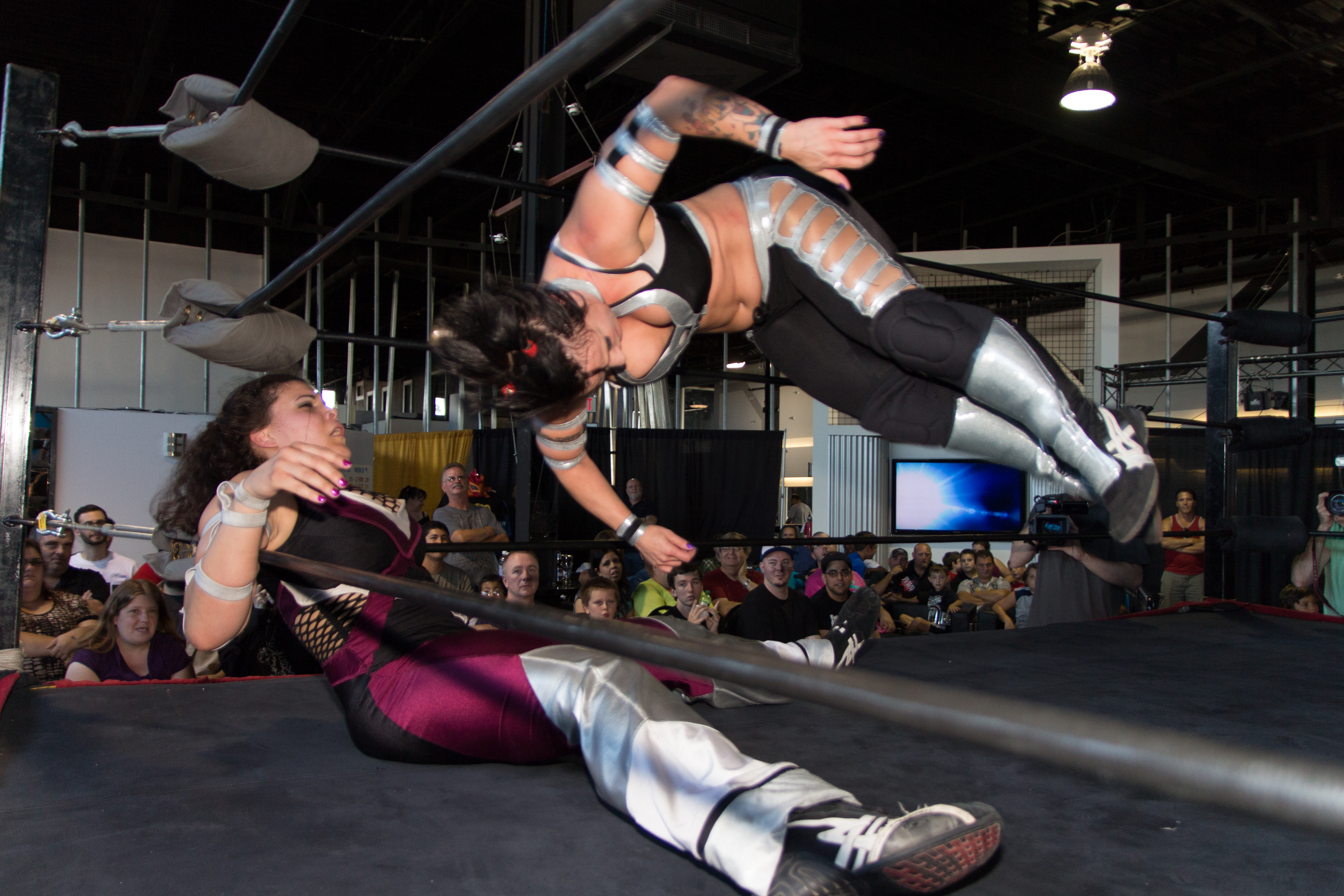
LuFisto performing a cannonball on Vanessa Kraven

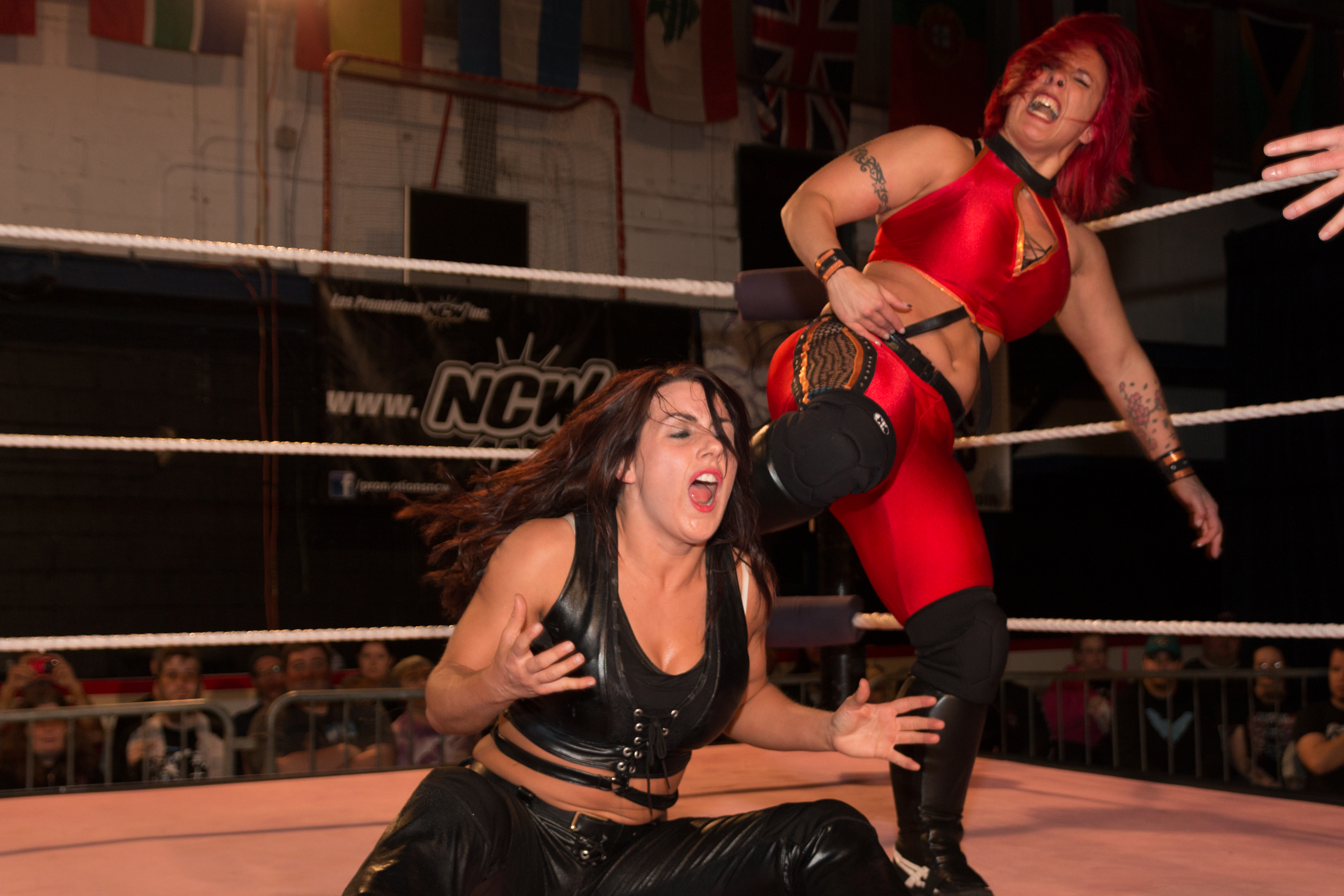
LuFisto striking Nikki Storm with a shoot kick

== Championships and accomplishments ==
- All-Star Wrestling
  - ASW Canadian Championship (1 time)
- Alpha Omega Wrestling
  - AOW Women's Championship (1 time)
- Association de Lutte Féminine
  - ALF Championship (1 time)
  - Sherri Memorial Cup Tournament (2007) – with El Generico
  - ALF Quebec Female Wrestling Hall of Fame
- Atomic Championship Wrestling
  - ACW Heavyweight Championship (1 time)
- Combat Zone Wrestling
  - CZW Best of the Best People's Choice (2008)
  - CZW Iron Man Championship (1 time)
  - CZW Hall of Fame (class of 2019)
- Evolution of Wrestling
  - Super 8 Women Tournament Championship (2005)
- Independent Wrestling Association Mid-South
  - IWA Mid-South Queen of the Deathmatch tournament (2007)
- Indie Wrestling Hall of Fame
  - Class of 2022
- Inter-Championship Wrestling
  - ICW Olympic Championship (1 time, current)
  - ICW Provincial Championship (2 times)
  - ICW Tag Team Championship (2 times) – with Sexy Julie and Mr. Saturday Night
  - Queen Of The Deathmatches Tournament (2007)
- International Wrestling Cartel
  - IWC Women's Championship (1 time)
- Jersey All Pro Wrestling
  - JAPW Women's Championship (1 time, final)
- Jonquière Championship Wrestling
  - JCW Tag Team Championship (1 time) – with Kathryn Von Goth
- La Lutte C Vrai
  - La Lutte C Vrai Championship (1 time)
- Lucha Libre Feminil
  - LLF Extreme Championship (1 time)
- Lucha Promotion Original Pro-Lucha
  - POP Women's Championship (1 time)
- Mission Pro Wrestling
  - MPW Year-End Award (1 time)
    - Match of the Year Award (2022) vs. Holidead in a No disqualification match on April 2
- Northern Championship Wrestling
  - NCW Femmes Fatales Championship Tournament (2010)
  - NCW International Femmes Fatales Championship (2 times)
- North Shore Pro Wrestling
  - NSPW Championship (1 time)
  - Hall of Fame (2019)
- Pro Wrestling Illustrated
  - Ranked No. 5 of the top 50 female wrestlers in the PWI Female 50 in 2014
- Slam Angels Wrestling
  - SAW World Championship (1 time)
- Stranglehold Wrestling
  - King of the Deathmatches (2006)
- Shine Wrestling
  - Shine Championship (1 time)
- Ultimate Wrestling Alliance
  - UWA Cruiserweight Championship (1 time)
- Women Superstars Uncensored
  - WSU World Championship (1 time)
- Westside Xtreme Wrestling
  - Femmes Fatales Tournament (2019)
