= JAPW Women's Championship =

Professional wrestling women's championship

Details
- Promotion: Jersey All Pro Wrestling
- Date established: June 27, 2009
- Date retired: February 25, 2018
Statistics
- First champion: Sara Del Rey
- Final champion: LuFisto
- Most reigns: All champions (1 time)
- Longest reign: Sara Del Rey; 1,157 days)
- Shortest reign: LuFisto; 127 days)
- Oldest champion: LuFisto (37 years, 248 days)
- Youngest champion: Kimber Lee (25 years, 329 days)
- Heaviest champion: Sara Del Ray (150 lb (68 kg))
- Lightest champion: Kimber Lee (119 lb (54 kg))

The JAPW Women's Championship was a women's professional wrestling championship in Jersey All Pro Wrestling. The title is also recognized by other promotions on the independent scene. Sara Del Rey was the inaugural champion. She defeated ODB on June 27, 2009, in Jersey City, New Jersey at Caged Destiny.

== History ==
On June 27, 2009, at Caged Destiny, ODB, who had defeated LuFisto in the main event of JAPW's first ever all-women's show, faced the undefeated Sara Del Rey, who had won a #1 Contender's Battle Royal at the second women's division show, to determine the first ever JAPW Women's Champion. In the end Del Rey won the match to become the inaugural champion. She has also been successful in her first title defense by defeating Portia Perez on August 1, 2009, at European Homicide. On September 12, Del Rey defeated Hailey Hatred to make the second title defense and a month later, at Halloween Hell, she was able to score another pinfall over Roxie Cotton. She made her fourth title defense against Alissa Flash on November 13, 2009, at a TNA house show in Wayne, New Jersey. Her fifth title defense went to a double disqualification against Cheerleader Melissa, after Hailey Hatred attacked both the Women's Champion and her challenger. Later in that night it was announced that at the next JAPW WD show the three of them would face each other in a three-way no disqualification match. One week later Del Rey was able to defeat Sumie Sakai to make her sixth title defense. On January 9, 2010, Sara Del Rey defeated Cheerleader Melissa and Hailey Hatred in a No DQ three-way match to make her seventh title defense. On January 16 Sara Del Rey retained once again her title against Sumie Sakai at the show January Infiltration from RCW. At JAPW's 12th Anniversary Show she defeated Madison Rayne in her ninth title defense and she has also accepted a challenge by Ayako Hamada for a future title shot. She defeated Jessica James at an ACW Show to make her tenth defense. Sara Del Rey continued to defend her title and she was also able to defeat Hailey Hatred in a Falls Count Anywhere Match at WildCard, a JAPW Show where the champions have to defend their titles against mystery opponents making her 11th defense. She made her 12th title defense against Ayumi Kurihara at the JAPW Show Old School on April 17, 2010. She made her 13th title defense against Annie Social at Notorious Thunder on May 22, 2010. On November 20, 2010, at November to Remember Sara Del Rey defended her title for the 14th time defeating Mia Yim. She kept her title defense going when she defeated LuFisto on 11 December, making her 15th title defense at the 13th Anniversary Show: Night Two.

== Title History ==
=== Names ===
Name	Time of use
JAPW Heavyweight Championship	June 27, 2009 – February 25, 2018

== Reigns ==
Key
No.	Overall reign number
Reign	Reign number for the specific champion
Days	Number of days held

No.	Champion	Championship change			Reign statistics		Notes	Ref.
No.	Champion	Date	Event	Location	Reign	Days	Notes	Ref.
1	Sara Del Rey	June 27, 2009	Caged Destiny	Jersey City, New Jersey	1	1,108	Defeated ODB to become the inaugural champion.	
—	Vacated	July 9, 2012	—	Jersey City, New Jersey	—	—	Vacated when Del Rey signed with WWE.	
2	Kimber Lee	April 30, 2016	—	Bayonne, New Jersey	1	249	Defeated Annie Social to win the vacant championship.	
—	Vacated	January 4, 2017	—	Jersey City, New Jersey	—	—	Vacated when Lee signed with WWE.	
3	LuFisto	October 21, 2017	Uprising	Rahway, New Jersey	1	127	Defeated Katred, Penelope Ford, and Gabby Ortiz in a Four-way match to win the vacant title.	
—	—	February 25, 2018	—	—	—	—	Titled retired when promotion closes.	

== See also ==
- Jersey All Pro Wrestling
