= Dave Prazak =

American professional wrestling promoter

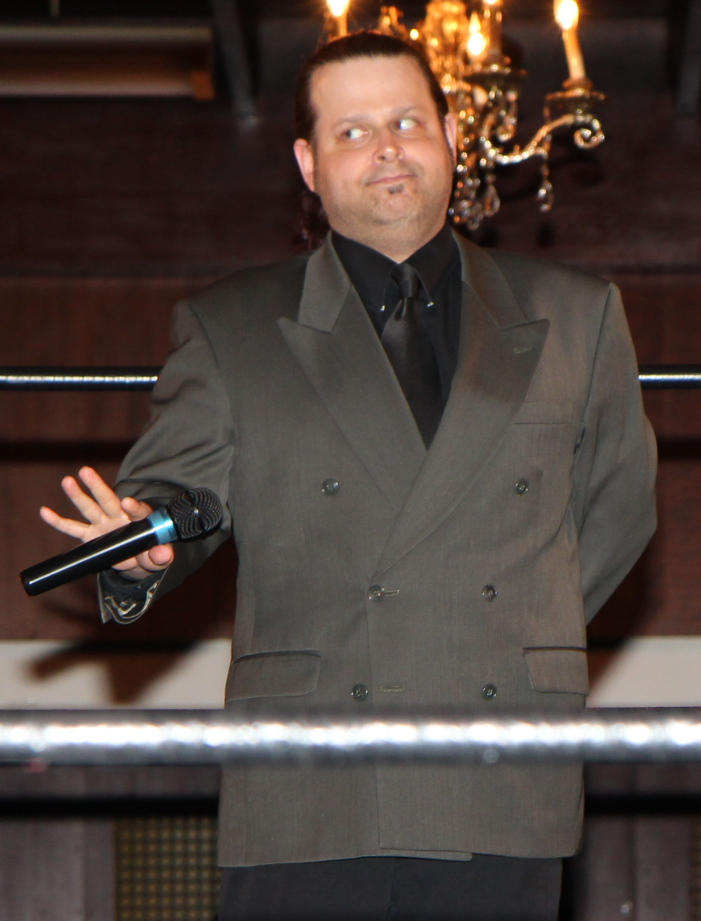
- Prazak in 2015
- Occupations: Professional wrestling promoter; Professional wrestling commentator
- Known for: Co-promoting of Shimmer Women Athletes from 2005 to 2021 and providing commentary for top level independent promotions.

Dave Prazak is an American professional wrestling promoter and commentator. He was the co-founder of Shimmer Women Athletes, one of the few women-only wrestling promotions in the United States in the 2000s and 2010s.

== Career ==
Prazak entered the professional wrestling industry in the mid-1990s as a professional wrestler himself, performing for promotions such as IWA Mid-South. By 2001, Prazak began to shift his focus on being a wrestling commentator, first with IWA-MS but by 2005 he had begun providing commentary for both Ring of Honor and its sister promotion Full Impact Pro. It was also in 2005 that Prazak, alongside Allison Danger, created Shimmer Women Athletes, which would remain in operation until 2021.

In 2020, Prazak became the primary commentator for Game Changer Wrestling events.

In 2021, Prazak was signed to Major League Wrestling to run and organise their women's division.

== Championships and accomplishments ==
- Indie Wrestling Hall of Fame
  - Class of 2022
