= Franky The Mobster =

Canadian professional wrestler

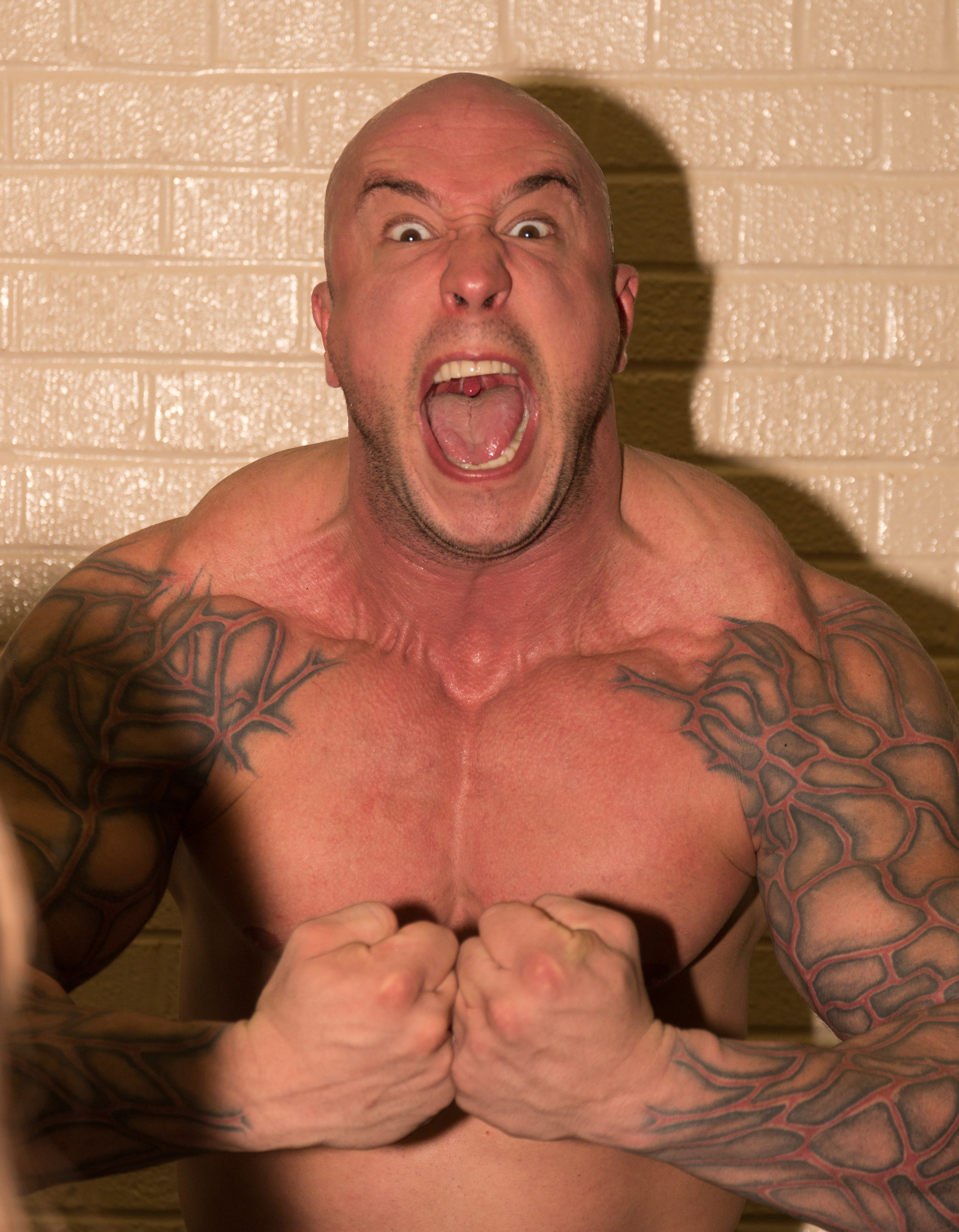
- Franky The Mobster, c. 2015

Personal information
- Born: Marc-André Boulanger Montreal, Quebec, Canada

Professional wrestling career
- Ring name(s): Franky The Mobster; Braun Mulligan; Beast King FTM
- Billed height: 6 ft 2 in (1.88 m)
- Billed weight: 225 lb (102 kg)
- Billed from: Milan, Italy; Minneapolis, Minnesota
- Debut: 1997

Marc-André Boulanger, better known by his ring name Franky The Mobster (or F.T.M. for short), is a Canadian professional wrestler and actor.

He currently wrestles for Montreal's International Wrestling Syndicate (IWS) and Northern Championship Wrestling (NCW), the Ontario-based Blood Sweat and Ears (BSE) promotion, as well as other independent promotion. He also has made occasional appearances for Ring of Honor. In NCW, he has held the NCW Inter-Cities Heavyweight Championship three times, the NCW Quebec Heavyweight Championship on four occasions, the NCW Tag Team Championship five times, and the NCW Television Championship once. While competing for IWS, he won the IWS Heavyweight Championship and the IWS Tag Team Championship on one occasion each. He held the BSE Suicide Six-Pack Championship on one occasion in 2007.

He has previously worked for Combat Zone Wrestling, where he is a former CZW Iron Man Champion. He also made appearances for Pro Wrestling Guerrilla, Canadian Championship Wrestling, Pro Wrestling Xtreme, and Elite Wrestling Revolution.

== Professional wrestling career ==
=== Northern Championship Wrestling ===
On October 11, 1997, Franky won the NCW Television Championship by defeating Daniel Léon, but only held it for a week, before dropping it to Black Eagle on October 18.

On December 18, 1999, Franky won the NCW Carlos Cup Championship by defeating Chakal, and held the championship until February 12, 2000, when he was defeated by Eric Shelley. Franky defeated Shelley the following month to regain the championship, but lost it to Steven the Sweet Boy less than a month later on April 1. In May, Franky won the championship for the third time, by defeating both Steven and Shelley in a three-way match. The championship was later vacated on September 9, due to Franky not defending it.

On January 13, 2001, Franky won his first NCW Quebec Championship by defeating Piranah. He held the championship for almost two months, before losing it to Guy Williams. He won the Quebec Championship for a second time a year later, by defeating Chakal on March 10, 2002. He lost it to Chakal two months later in May 2002. He won the championship for the third time on February 21, 2004, by defeating Manuel Vegas, but lost it to Chakal on April 3.

On October 29, 2021, Franky returned to NCW, defeating Jesse Champagne for his fourth NCW Quebec Heavyweight Championship.

=== International Wrestling Syndicate ===
Franky began competing regularly for the International Wrestling Syndicate (IWS) in 2004. He made his first IWS appearance on July 2 at Mid Summer Madness, by defeating Excess69. He continued competing for them over the next few months, both in singles and tag team competition. In August, he teamed with Kevin Steen to defeat Green Phantom and El Generico, and he went on to defeat Beef Wellington in October. On November 24, at Born to Bleed, he defeated Steen, Generico, Excess, Kurt Lauderdale and Pierre Carl Ouellet to win the IWS Heavyweight Championship. He had successful defenses against Ouellet, Steen and SeXXXy Eddy, before losing the championship to SeXXXy Eddy in a cage match also involving The Arsenal and Evil Ninja on July 9, 2005. He attempted to regain the championship on several occasions, but was unsuccessful.

He continued competing sporadically for the IWS for the next several years, facing wrestlers including Beef Wellington, Excess, Sofirios, Jake Matthews, Shane Matthews, Jagged, Brick Crawford, Pierre Carl Ouellet, and Eddie Kingston. At Know Your Enemies on March 28, 2008, Franky teamed up with Twiggy to defeat 2.0 (Jagged and Shane Matthews), The Super Smash Brothers (Player Uno and Stupefied) and The Untouchables (Dan Paysan and Jimmy Stone) in a four-way tag team match to win the IWS Tag Team Championship. Franky and Twiggy dubbed themselves "The Rock 'n Roid Express" and went on to successfully defend the championship against 2.0. At Hardcore Heat in August 2008, Up in Smoke (Cheech and Cloudy) won the Tag Team Championship by defeating Twiggy and El Generico, who was a replacement for Franky.

=== American independent promotions ===
Franky began competing for the Philadelphia-based promotion Combat Zone Wrestling (CZW) in 2005. On February 2, 2005, Franky won the CZW Iron Man Championship by defeating B-Boy at Only The Strong. He held the championship for over six months, having successful championship defenses against Adam Flash at Liberated and Coming Full Circle in March, Beef Wellington in April at Trifecta 3, and Chris Hero in July at High Stakes 3. He eventually lost the championship to Kevin Steen at Deja Vu 3 on August 13. Following the loss of his championship, he did not appear in CZW again until December 2005, when he teamed up with Larry Sweeney to defeat Team Masturbation (Excalibur and Beef Wellington) at Cage of Death 7. His next and final appearance in CZW was in August 2006 at Trapped, when he competed in a three-team All Out War match as a member of The Canadian Team, alongside Kevin Steen, LuFisto, and El Generico against The Forefathers of CZW (Nick Gage, Justice Pain, and Eddie Kingston) and The Blackout (Ruckus, Sabian, Joker, and Robby Mireno), which The Forefathers of CZW won.

On March 10, 2007, Franky appeared at Pro Wrestling Guerrilla's Album of the Year show, where he teamed up with Kevin Steen as "Frank N' Steen" to lose to the team of Chris Bosh and Scott Lost.

In 2009, Franky began competing for Ring of Honor (ROH). He made his ROH debut at The Hunt Begins in Montreal on April 17, when he lost to Chris Hero. At Death Before Dishonor VII Night 1 in Toronto on July 24, Franky lost to D'Lo Brown. He won his first match in ROH at Death Before Dishonor VII Night 2 on July 24, when he defeated Bison Smith by disqualification.

=== Other promotions ===
Franky has made various appearances for Canadian independent promotions. He wrestled for the Apocalypse Wrestling Federation in 2002, and has appeared for the Quebec-based promotion Elite Wrestling Revolution on several occasions. One of his most notable matches for EWR occurred on April 5, 2005, when he defeated Homicide in a singles match.

On August 23, 2007, Franky made an appearance for Pro Wrestling Xtreme, when he unsuccessfully challenged Derek Wylde for the PWX X Championship.

On August 26, 2007, Franky won the Suicide Six-Pack Championship, by defeating the defending champion Ash, as well as Cody 45, Pierre Shadows, Vane, and Xtremo at Scorched Earth. He held the championship until May 10, 2008, when he lost it to Xtremo in a match also involving Bang Bang Pete, Johnny Devine, Kaz, and Akira Raijin.

On December 20, 2008, NCW announced that Franky The Mobster was in Toronto, Ontario trying out for World Wrestling Entertainment.

In 2012, Franky won the TOW Championship, after defeating Sylvain Grenier and Darkko in a triple-threat match.

In 2017, at WCPW Pro Wrestling World Cup Canadian qualifying round, Franky was defeated by Davey Boy Smith Jr. in the first round of the first round of the Canada Leg.

== Championships and accomplishments ==
- Blood Sweat and Ears
  - BSE Suicide Six-Pack Championship (1 time)
- Canadian Championship Wrestling
  - CCW Heavyweight Championship (2 times)
- Combat Zone Wrestling
  - CZW Iron Man Championship (1 time)
- International Wrestling Syndicate
  - IWS World Heavyweight Championship (1 time)
  - IWS World Tag Team Championship (2 times)
- Northern Championship Wrestling
  - NCW Inter-Cities Heavyweight Championship (3 times)
  - NCW Quebec Heavyweight Championship (4 times, current)
  - NCW Tag Team Championship (5 times) - with Raiden (4) and Nightmare (1)
  - NCW Television Championship (1 time)
- Northern Shore Pro Wrestling
  - Standing 8 Tournament (2015)
- Top of the World Wrestling
  - ToW Heavyweight Champion (1 time)
- Pro Wrestling Illustrated
  - PWI ranked him #356 of the top 500 singles wrestlers in the PWI 500 in 2010
