= The Green Phantom =

Canadian professional wrestler

Personal information
- Born: Joseph Fitzmorris; July 30, 1976 (age 49) Deux-Montagnes, Quebec, Canada

Professional wrestling career
- Ring names: The Green Phantom; The Purple Phantom
- Billed height: 6 ft 5 in (198 cm)
- Billed weight: 245 lb (111 kg)
- Billed from: Ancient green hills of Two Mountains
- Trained by: TNT
- Debut: 1999

Joseph Fitzmorris (born July 30, 1976), is a Canadian professional wrestler better known by his ring name The Green Phantom.

He is best known for his contributions to the North American independent and hardcore wrestling scene, appearing in several independent promotions including International Wrestling Syndicate (IWS), Game Changer Wrestling (GCW), Combat Zone Wrestling (CZW), IWA Mid-South, Northern Championship Wrestling (NCW), Insane Championship Wrestling, Ring of Honor, Juggalo Championship Wrestling (JCW), and Xtreme Pro Wrestling (XPW).

Fitzmorris is recognized for his hardcore powerhouse brawling style, having faced notable opponents including Necro Butcher, Kevin Steen, El Generico, Sabu, PCP Crazy F’n Manny, PCO, Sheamus, Brodie Lee, SeXXXy Eddy, Nick Gage, Matt Tremont and Mike Bailey.

He has competed in notable hardcore tournaments in the early to mid 2010s, such as Tournament of Death, King of the Deathmatch and Tournament of Survival. He participated in the first Exploding Ring and Fans Bring The Weapons matches in Canada. He is the longest-reigning IWS World Heavyweight Champion.

== Early life ==
Fitzmorris grew up in the Montreal suburb of Deux-Montagnes, Quebec. Fitzmorris grew up playing sports, excelling at hockey, football, Irish football and rugby, which he is still active in being a proud member of the Montreal Irish Rugby Football Club.

His father is of Irish descent, citing his Irish ancestry as part of what makes the Green Phantom "green".

== Professional wrestling career ==
=== Early career (1999-2002) ===
Fitzmorris’ wrestling career began in Fall of 1999 for the International Wrestling Syndicate, and was trained by Montreal-based wrestler TNT.

Fitzmorris describes his character as being influenced by Hulk Hogan, Mike Awesome, and Sabu. Fitzmorris claims that the name and character Green Phantom chose him, he didn't choose it. Fitzmorris incorporated a green luchador mask he was gifted as a teenager in his first wrestling gear, and has been donning green masks since. "Get with the Green" is the Green Phantom's catchphrase, stating "Green is the colour of growth, green is the colour of the future and when you come to a stop-light what colour do you want to see? You want to see green, baby!"

Other nicknames include The Hardcore Hero, The Canadian Table Breaker, and The Hardcore Luchador.

=== International Wrestling Syndicate (1999–present) ===
On October 30, 1999, Green Phantom made his IWS debut at WWS Payback's A Bitch, at Wally's Pub in Montreal. In July 2001 at Un F'N Sanctioned, Hardcore Ninjaz faced PCP Crazy F'N Manny and Green Phantom in the first IWS Fans Bring The Weapons Match, at Le Skratch in Laval. On May 18, 2002 at Freedom To Fight, Green Phantom won his first IWS World Heavyweight Championship in a 4-Way Elimination Match defeating PCP Crazy F'N Manny, The Arsenal and SeXXXy Eddy.

On March 26, 2005 at Un F'N Sanctioned, Green Phantom defeated Chris Hero at the Medley. On June 3, 2006 at Un F’N Sanctioned, Sabu worked his (then) last independent match teaming with PCO defeating Green Phantom and Dru Onyx, 48 hours prior to debuting on WWE Raw. On January 10, 2009 at Season's Beatings, Green Phantom defeated "Big Rig" Brodie Lee in his annual IWS Christmas Tree Deathmatch. On March 6, 2010 at Praise The Violence, Green Phantom defeated Beef Wellington, winning his second IWS World Heavyweight Championship. IWS held its (then) final show on October 9, 2010 at Club Soda, featuring IWS originals SeXXXy Eddy, PCP Crazy F'N Manny, The Arsenal and IWS World Heavyweight Champion Green Phantom in a Fans Bring The Weapons Match.

On September 20, 2014 at Scarred For Life, Green Phantom lost the IWS World Heavyweight Championship to Mike Bailey, making him the current longest-reigning title holder in IWS history at 1960 days. On April 6, 2019 at Unstoppable, Green Phantom defeated Nick Gage and Matt Tremont in a Hardcore Match at White Eagle Hall in Jersey City. On November 13, 2021 at IWS Un F'N Sanctioned 2021 Part 1 at MTELUS, he finally gets his shot at the title in a three-way match against reigning champion Kevin Blanchard and Matt Falco.

=== Game Changer Wrestling (2023–2024) ===
On March 11, 2023 The Green Phantom would get his first taste of Game Changer Wrestling (GCW) in a co-promoted IWS and GCW event called IWS vs. GCW: Un F'N Sanctioned at the L'Olympia, Montreal, Quebec. There, he teamed with PCP Crazy F'N Manny & SeXXXy Eddy against Nick Gage, Rina Yamashita & Mance Warner in the infamous Fans Bring the Weapons Deathmatch in the main event of the show. This was the first time he ever wrestled under the GCW banner and the first time GCW fans outside Quebec saw him in a GCW ring.

The Green Phantom would make his official Game Changer Wrestling (GCW) debut on March 19, 2023, at GCW worst Behavior, GCW's inaugural Toronto event held at The Opera House. Phantom teamed with Le Tabarnak de Team (TBT) — the powerhouse Quebec duo of Mathieu St-Jacques and Thomas Dubois (dressed like lumberjacks with a French-Canadian swagger) — against two stacked GCW squads: BUSSY (Allie Katch & Effy) alongside the monstrous Sawyer Wreck, and Los Macizos (Ciclope & Miedo Extremo) paired with Jimmy Lloyd.

The Green Phantom would return to Game Changer Wrestling (GCW) on June 3, 2023 at GCW Tournament of Survival 8 Pay-Per-View held at the Showboat Hotel in Atlantic City, New Jersey as a part of their annual deathmatch tournament. The tournament featured him in a brutal first-round triple threat match against Ciclope and Miedo Extremo, where Ciclope emerged victorious after a frog splash through a pane of glass on The Green Phantom.

In 2023, Green Phantom made his debut at Korakuen Hall in Tokyo, widely regarded as one of the most prestigious and historically significant venues in professional wrestling. He appeared alongside fellow deathmatch wrestling legend Necro Butcher, marking a notable international appearance for both performers. The event represented a major milestone in Green Phantom's career, making him one of the relatively few Canadian independent wrestlers to compete at the iconic venue, which has hosted generations of Japan's top wrestling promotions and international talent. His Korakuen Hall debut further expanded his wrestling career into the Japanese market.

He would continue to make appearances on GCW shows noticeably teaming with his IWS allies in the ongoing IWS vs GCW war. Some of his memorable appearances happened on the second co-promoted IWS and GCW event on March 2, 2024 for IWS's 25th anniversary. At IWS/GCW: UnFnSanctioned 25th Anniversary he would team with his fellow IWS brothers, which included Mathieu St-Jacques, PCP Crazy F'N Manny & Sexxxy Eddy and would face GCW's team of BUSSY (Allie Katch & Effy), Jimmy Lloyd & Joey Janela. Chaos reigned—tacks everywhere, fire flickering. Phantom hulked up after a Janela elbow, superplexing him through stacked tables. In the end, Manny isolated Lloyd for a Mandy Flyer onto tubes; Phantom sealed it with the Phantom Menaceon Effy amid thumbtacks and pins him for the win.

== Personal life ==
Fitzmorris is a science and physical education teacher, as well as a football coach at the high-school level. Outside of professional wrestling, Fitzmorris (as Green Phantom) makes appearances in the Montreal comedy scene doing stand up comedy, including a series of shows at the Just for Laughs Festival. He has opened up speaking shows for the likes of Jake “the Snake” Roberts, Ken Shamrock, and Mick Foley.

He performed in and produced his current entrance music, entitled Get with the Green, featuring Slik Jack and Wes Nile, including video directed by the Sanchez Brothers.

On March 4, 2022, IWS and Brutopia launched Green Phantom's Get with the Green citrus ale beer.

== Championships and accomplishments ==
- CRW Wrestling
  - CRW Hardcore Championship (2 times)
- Fédération de Lutte Québécoise
  - FLQ Heavyweight Championship
- International Wrestling Syndicate
  - IWS World Heavyweight Championship (2 times)
  - IWS World Tag Team Championship (2 times) - with Dru Onyx, eXceSs
  - IWS Canadian Championship
- Monteregie Wrestling Federation
  - MWF Tag Team Championship (2 times) - with Johnny North
- Pro Wrestling Eclipse
  - PWE Mask Championship
