= SeXXXy Eddy =

Canadian professional wrestler

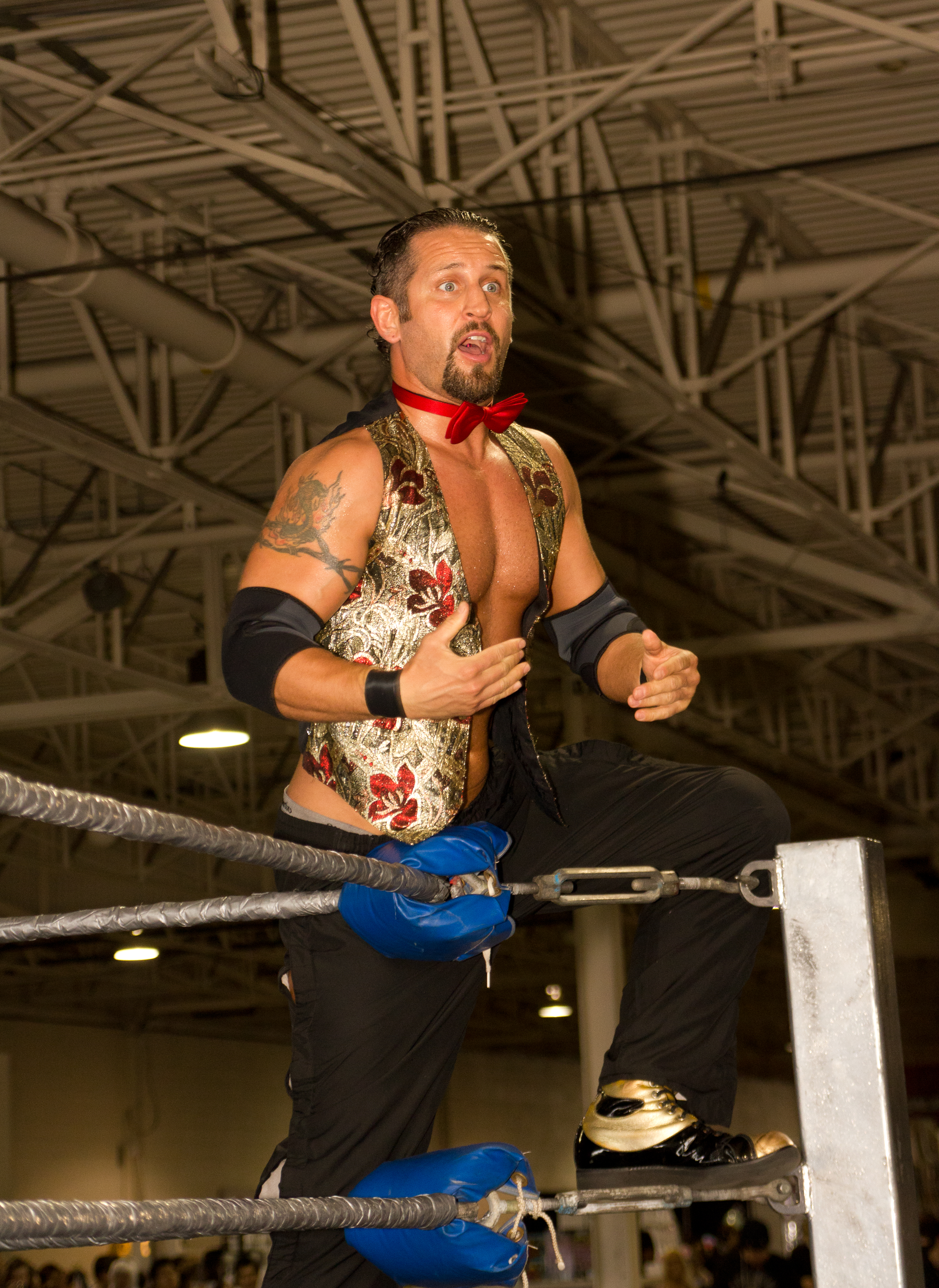
- SeXXXy Eddy in May 2012

Personal information
- Born: Edward Dorozowsky; April 13, 1978 (age 48) Montreal, Quebec, Canada
- Website: SeXXXy Eddy on Myspace

Professional wrestling career
- Ring name: SeXXXy Eddy
- Billed height: 6 ft 1 in (1.85 m)
- Billed weight: 202 lb (92 kg)
- Billed from: Very Long Beach, California
- Trained by: Marc the Grizzly; Heavy Maxx Fury
- Debut: April 23, 1999

Edward Dorozowsky (born April 13, 1978) is a Canadian professional wrestler and former promoter, best known by his ring name SeXXXy Eddy. He has competed in several North American independent promotions including Chikara, Combat Zone Wrestling, IWA Mid-South, Jersey All Pro Wrestling, Northern Championship Wrestling, Pro Wrestling Guerrilla, and has toured Europe with International Pro Wrestling: United Kingdom and Westside Xtreme Wrestling.

Eddy is also the co-founder of the International Wrestling Syndicate along with PCP Crazy F’N Manny and Nixon Stratus. As part of his controversial in-ring persona, heavily influenced by "Ravishing" Rick Rude and Shawn Michaels, he has wrestled in a considerable number of mixed and intergender matches with numerous female wrestlers.

== Early life ==
Born in Montreal, Quebec, Dorozowsky was a wrestling fan growing up and, during interviews, recalls watching his first wrestling match with his father, a steel cage match between the Big Boss Man and then WWF World Heavyweight Champion Hulk Hogan on the May 27, 1989 Saturday Night's Main Event XXI. He also attended an independent wrestling event several years later which was raising money for the "Telethon Of Stars" charity. His older sister Alexandra, who was in a wheelchair due to spina bifida, was the guest of honor.

Dorozowsky was involved in sports during high school, including rugby, football and three years of amateur wrestling.

== Professional wrestling career ==
=== Dawson Wrestling Federation ===
Dorozowsky then attended Dawson College, where he and his friend Deniz Celik became radio DJs and, during the spring of 1998, they began a faux "on-air war" between each other which had started from private joking and eventually escalated to their agreeing to meet in a fight at the college's annual campus barbecue. The violent "backyard wrestling" match Clash of the Titans between Dorozowsky versus S.O.B. D.O.C. took place on several gym mats taped together. The brawl included a filing cabinet, an ironing board, a ladder, and smashing beer bottles on their heads, was taped on video and widely distributed in the local Montreal-area. One year later, Dorozowsky formed the Dawson Wrestling Federation and held the first indoor wrestling event at the campus. He held the championship belt for one year without a title defense. Working with the college newspaper "The Plant", stories were written months before leading to and hyping the upcoming show. Local wrestler Rendinella "Heavy Maxx Fury" Rendinella had seen the tape of the first show and offered to train Dorozowsky for their bout. SeXXXy Eddy made his in-ring debut at Rumble in the PARC against his trainer in the gymnasium at Dawson College on April 23, 1999. His father Ed Sr. accompanied him as his manager, while his brother Jonathan was the cameraman during the show. The match, much like his previous one, was a hardcore-style match which involved thumbtacks. One of his key hardcore finishing moves, the Garbage sault, was also demonstrated for the first time ever during the match when he performed a moonsault while holding a garbage can over his head. Following this event, due to the excessive blood loss from Eddy, the college prohibited live wrestling events on college property.

=== World Wrestling Syndicate ===
After the match, Rendinella suggested looking into working for the Montreal-based Northern Championship Wrestling (NCW). Eddy accepted his offer and began training with NCW's head instructor Marc the Grizzly. In early 1999, Eddy joined with PCP Crazy F’N Manny and Nixon Stratus to form the World Wrestling Syndicate (WWS) and held their first show, Blood, Sweat & Beers '99 at "Wally's Pub" on June 17, 1999. Due to the ceiling being so low, this space could easily be converted into a makeshift wrestling ring by attaching ropes to the pillars and laying down mats taped together. On October 30, after winning a match for a title shot against WWS Heavyweight Champion TNT, SeXXXy Eddy defeated him for the title in the main event later that night for his first official WWS title reign.

The WWS very quickly gained a reputation as one of Quebec's fastest growing independent promotions comparable to Extreme Championship Wrestling and Japanese "garbage wrestling" promotions such as Big Japan Pro Wrestling and Frontier Martial-Arts Wrestling. The promotion became known among some Quebec wrestling fans as "La fed Canadian Tire" for the foreign objects used in matches. Even with its cult following, the promotion was forced to move when Wally's closed and the last WWS show Praise the Violence was held there in April 2000. Finding new venues with higher ceilings gave the WWS the chance to rent out and perform in a professional wrestling ring, giving the company more credibility among wrestling fans and Quebec wrestlers as well. To reflect the evolution from mats to a ring, WWS became the International Wrestling Syndicate (IWS).

During much of his early career, Eddy wrestled in the Montreal-area for Northern Championship Wrestling, being voted NCW's "Rookie of the Year" in 2000, as well as the IWS becoming a mainstay in both promotions. He also spent time in independent promotions in Ontario and Newfoundland.

=== Internet Wrestling Syndicate ===
Soon after leaving "Wally's Pub", the promotion was renamed the "Internet Wrestling Syndicate" (and later the "International Wrestling Syndicate" after Eddy traveled to wrestle in Europe). The name change of "Internet" was more representative of the way the IWS was promoting itself, through several online promos and matches made available to the fans to advance the storylines. Both Eddy and Nic allowed Manny to take over the day-to-day running of the promotion so as to concentrate on their own wrestling careers. After Eleftheriou formed a partnership with Carol Cox's Wild Rose Productions, a Montreal-based adult entertainment internet company, the promotion began holding events at the Club Le Medley.

On October 6, 2001, SeXXXy Eddy won the IWS Heavyweight Championship for a second time and held the title for over half a year. On November 21, Eddy appeared at the IWS's second Medley show, Born to Bleed '01, pinning PCP Crazy F’N Manny in the main event after a leaping frog splash off the balcony. On November 24, at the supercard Payback's a Bitch '01, Eddy was scheduled to defend his title against Carl Leduc. Shortly before the match however, Leduc entered the ring and refused to face Eddy criticizing him and the promotion. When he became involved in an altercation with several fans at ringside, Manny came out to give Leduc money for his appearance and had security escort him from the building. As a result of this incident, Leduc's father, Paul Leduc ended his company's relationship with IWS which included renting out their wrestling ring to the IWS.

In June 2002, Eddy faced former World Wrestling Federation star Brutus "The Barber" Beefcake in the 2nd round of the tournament and suffered a concussion during the match. Although he does not recall the final round, he won the Tournament of the Icons III in Deux-Montagnes. Suffering the serious shoulder injury, in which nearly all the ligaments in his right shoulder were torn, he was out of action for nearly a year. In one of his earliest matches back, he lost to Fred la Merveille at "Bar Unison" in Montreal on January 18, 2004.

=== Combat Zone Wrestling ===
In May 2003, still nursing his shoulder injury, Eddy was called by Combat Zone Wrestling (CZW) promoter John Zandig and offered him a spot at CZW Tournament of Death II, however he declined Zandig's offer so he could take another year off to train and allow more time to heal his injury. He did, however, accept Zandig's offer to enter the CZW Tournament of Death III in Smyrna, Delaware on July 24, 2004. Initially introduced performing a lap dance on Zandig's wife, he later went on to defeat Ian Knoxx in a "Thumbtack & Carpet Strip" match in the opening rounds. In the semi-finals against Arsenal, Eddy defeated him in a Light Tubes match as well. He cut an artery in his left forearm during the match, however, and it was announced that he would have to forfeit the Final 3-way with Necro Butcher & Wifebeater, and go to the local hospital for stitches. Eddy had nineteen stitches all over his body, and his arm had to be sutured and burnt shut to stop the bleeding.

Inviting him back for CZW's High Stakes on September 11, SeXXXy Eddy defeated Kevin Steen, El Generico and eXeSs in a four-way match. Afterwards, he was given a standing ovation by the crowd chanting "please come back". Making appearances at CZW supercards High Stakes 2, Cage of Death VI and Gen Z, he also made an appearance for Jersey All Pro Wrestling, losing to Kevin Steen on December 10. The following night, Eddy joined Team Ca$h (Chri$ Ca$h, JC Bailey and Nate Webb) defeating Team Blackout (Ruckus, Sabian, Eddie Kingston and Jack Evans) to win the CZW World Tag Team Championship in a War Games-style Cage of Death match on December 11. During the match, Eddy performed his signature "Garbage sault" off the top of the steel cage.

=== International Wrestling Syndicate ===
Returning to Montreal at the end of that week, he defeated Damian on December 18, 2004. On June 12, Eddy appeared in the main event of the IWS 5th anniversary show V teaming with the Green Phantom in a death match against Arsenal and Evil Ninja. PCP Crazy F'N Manny was the special guest referee. The match saw the use of light tubes, glass and fire before the Green Phantom put Evil Ninja through a burning pane of glass. The event also featured Pierre Ouellet and Sid Vicious, returning from a near three-year absence from wrestling, who together won the 10-team tag rumble. Appearing as Touché, the official mascot for the Montreal Alouettes, Eddy pinned Eric Mastrocola, the "handler" of Kamala, during the half-time show at an Alouettes football game attended by over 20,200 fans on July 15. The match-up saw Kamala being pinned by Jacques Rougeau.

On September 25, Eddy appeared in the co-main event at Freedom to Fight against eXeSs and IWS Heavyweight Champion "Mr.Wrestling" Kevin Steen in a triple threat match. Earlier, he had been slapped by Steen in a pre-match interview. The show opened with the video of his CZW match against El Generico, Kevin Steen and eXeSs in the 4-way match, which he had won. On October 30, Eddy made his first appearance for Jersey All Pro Wrestling losing to El Generico in a four-way match with eXeSs and Beef Wellington.

The following month, Eddy went on a 3-day tour of Europe appearing with Westside Xtreme Wrestling in Essen, Germany facing Steve Douglas at Fan Appreciation Night on November 19 and, the next night at Fight Club '04, Thumbtack Jack in a TLC match. On November 21, SeXXXy Eddy was a last minute replacement for Nick Mondo when he participated in an event for International Pro Wrestling: United Kingdom losing to Paul Travell in a three-way match with Flaming Red in Kent, England on November 21.

=== IWS, CZW and the independent circuit ===
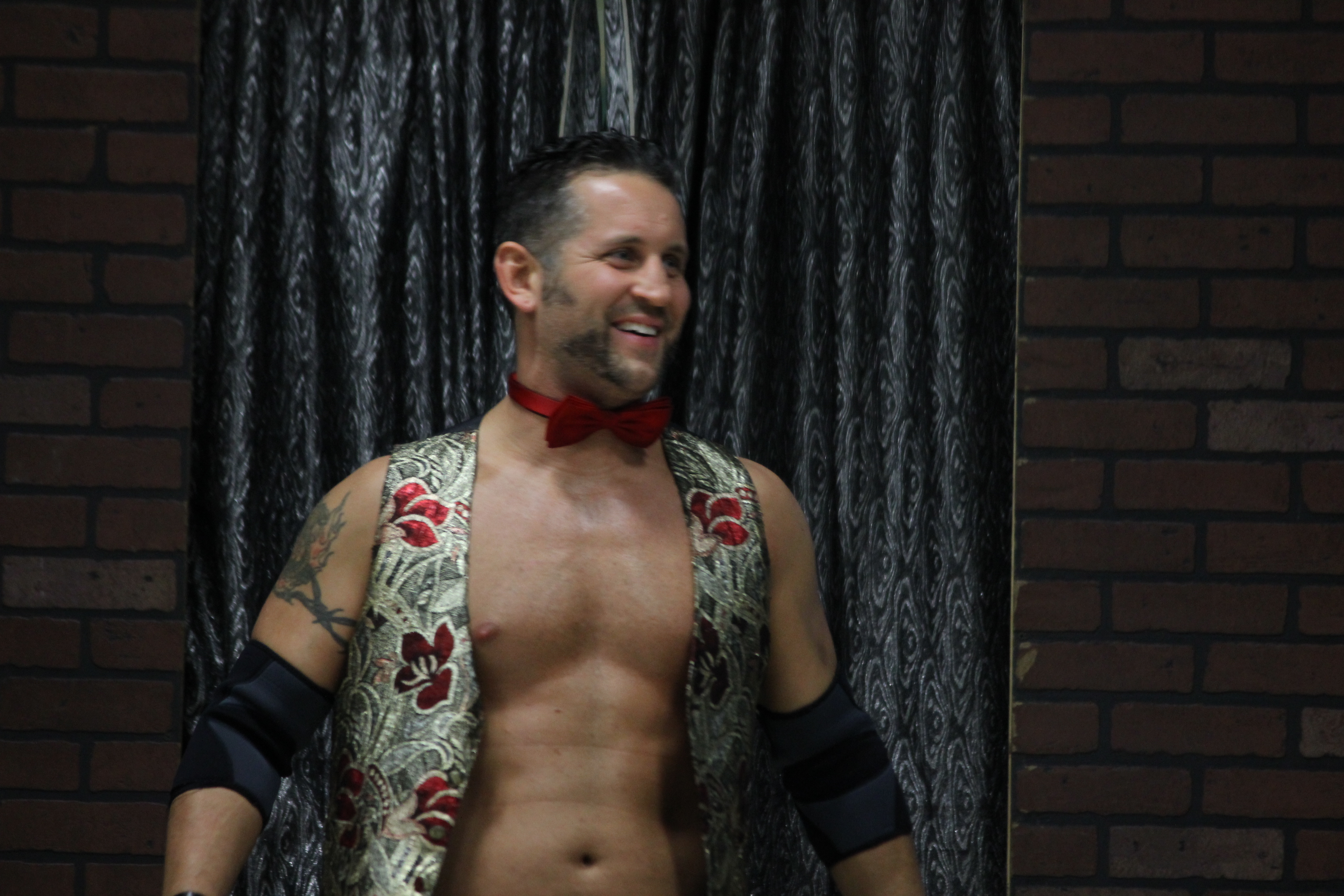
Eddy in 2013

On January 8, 2005, SeXXXy Eddy and Chris Ca$h successfully defended their CZW tag titles against Super Dragon and Excalibur. At the New Year's Madness supercard on January 22, he defeated Beef Wellington, Damian, Kid Kamikaze, Mr. X-TreeM and Hell Storm in a six-way match. In another 4-way match, he lost to Mike Quackenbush in a match for the CZW World Junior Heavyweight Championship with Arsenal and Alex Shelley on February 5. He managed to return to IWS for the supercard Un F'N Sanctioned losing to eXeSs on March 26, considered one of his best matches in his career; and IWS World Heavyweight Champion Franky the Mobster on April 23. Losing to Kevin Steen at a show for Pro Wrestling Guerrilla on May 13, the following night in CZW he and "Spyder" Nate Webb defeated Blackout (Ruckus and Eddie Kingston). He also lost to B-Boy at a JAPW show in Braintree, Massachusetts on May 21.

On May 28, Eddy defeated Don Paysan (with valet D-Vyn) at an IWS event. Paysan had previously interfered in his earlier match with Franky the Mobster costing him the match against the IWS World Heavyweight Champion. On June 4, he lost to EWR Heavyweight Champion eXeSs in a three-way match with Eric Cooper at a Rahway, New Jersey show for JAPW. Due to outside interference from Eddie Kingston, he also lost to CZW World Heavyweight Champion Ruckus in a cage match on June 11.

On July 2, Eddy won a 4-way over B-Boy, Alex Price and Cody 45 at the Mid-Summer Madness supercard. A week later in Philadelphia for the IWS debut in the United States, he defeated Franky the Mobster, Arsenal and Evil Ninja in a steel cage main-event match to capture the IWS World Heavyweight title for the unprecedented 3rd time! That same day for CZW's night show in the same arena, Eddy lost to Blackout (Ruckus, Sabian and Eddie Kingston) in a 6-man tag team match with "Spyder" Nate Webb and B-Boy. Defending the IWS World Heavyweight Championship at a UWA Hardcore Wrestling show, he defeated Chris Bishop on July 22. He also beat Franky the Mobster, the Green Phantom and Kurt Lauderdale in a 4-way hardcore match the next night.

Eddy once again entered the 2005 CZW Tournament of Death IV and lost to JC Bailey in the opening round. In one of the more infamous moments of the tournament, Bailey poured thumbtacks down Eddy's trunks and then kicked him in the crotch during their match. In an interpromotional show between CZW and the Maven Bentley Association, Eddy defending his IWS title against Sabian defeating him on August 6. He would lose the title to eXeSs at an IWS show in a ladder match almost two weeks later.

On August 26, Eddy lost to Beef Wellington in a four-way match with El Generico and Kevin Steen at another show for UWA Hardcore Wrestling. Eddy also lost his 2 front teeth, smashing his face against the ring post that night. Two months later, he lost to eXeSs in a First Blood match on October 29. He also lost to CZW World Junior Heavyweight Champion Derek Frazier in a 3-way match with JC Bailey on November 12. However, he defeated Beef Wellington at a UWA Hardcore Wrestling show on November 25. At an IWS show on December 3, Eddy lost to the Green Phantom in a 3-way Christmas Tree Death match with Tomassino and, on December 10 at CZW's annual Cage of Death show, he and "Spyder" Nate Webb lost to Adam Flash and TNA's Sonjay Dutt.

Losing to Asylum at a UWA Hardcore Wrestling show on January 13, 2006; and then to "Sweet & Sour" Larry Sweeney and the H8 Club on February 11. Entering the Chikara 2006 World Grand Prix Tag Tournament, SeXXXy Eddy and "Mr.Wrestling" Kevin Steen lost to Arik Cannon and Jigsaw in the opening rounds on February 26. On March 11, Eddy teamed with XPW's Messiah & "Spyder" Nate Webb in a 6-man tag team match. Due to miscommunication, lost to Sonjay Dutt, B-Boy and Adam Flash. He also lost to Asylum in a Falls Count Anywhere Street Fight for UWA Hardcore Wrestling later that month. At an event for CWA Montreal, he and Necro Butcher lost to The Alliance of Violence ("Strongman" Gino Martino and Pierre "The Beast" Vachon) in an American Hardcore Frenzy match on April 8.

In early 2006, SeXXXy Eddy and LuFisto formed a regular tag team, the "Missionaries of Violence", and partnered with each other throughout the year in mixed tag team matches. On April 22, Eddy and LuFisto defeated Jagger W. Bush and Shayne Hawke; and on June 3, they defeated "SLI-USA" (Jagger W. Bush, Shayne Hawke and Fred la Merveille), The Rock and Cock Express (Twiggy and Pornstar Juan) and The Soprano Family (Tomassino and "Paranoid" Jake Matthews) in a 4-way tag team match. On June 10, "MOV" made their debut in CZW losing to Adam Flash and Pandora. On July 8, Eddy defeated Niles Young at A Prelude to Violence to win the CZW Junior Heavyweight title and defended it against Jeremy Prophet on a CWA Montreal card on July 22. On August 13 at the Montreal Vans Warped Tour, Eddy defeated Beef Wellington and Kid Kamikaze in a 3-way Hardcore match for Inter Species Wrestling; and on that same card, lost to IWS Canadian Champion Player Uno in a five-way match with Jagged, Jimmy Stone and Don Paysan. Losing to Kevin Steen and Jeremy Prophet in a tag team match with Stevie McFly on August 19, he and LuFisto also lost to IWS Tag Team Champions The Hardcore Ninjaz on August 26.

At the CZW's Chris Ca$h Memorial on September 9, Eddy lost the CZW World Junior Heavyweight title to Sonjay Dutt. On September 30, Eddy and LuFisto lost to Lionel Knight and Christopher Bishop at an IWS show. On October 14, Eddy lost to CZW World Junior Heavyweight Champion Jigsaw in a 3-way match with Luke. On October 28, he and Beef Wellington lost to the Christopher Street Connection for JAPW's 10 Year Anniversary show and; the next night, lost to Mad Man Pondo in Stranglehold Wrestling's King of the Death Match Tournament. SeXXXy Eddy also made a 2-day appearance for IWA Mid-South entering as the only male wrestler in the first annual Queen of the Death Match Tournament on November 3. Brought in as a last minute replacement, he defeated "Pryme Tyme" Amy Lee in a Four Corners of Pain Death match in the opening rounds before being eliminated by Mayumi Ozaki in a 2-out-of-3 Log Cabins of Glass Death match in the semi-finals. He and Jagged beat out Chuck Taylor and Mitch Ryder in a tag team match the next night.

On November 10, SeXXXy Eddy and Beef Wellington lost to "Up in Smoke" (Cheech and Cloudy) at an MXW show in Albany, New York for promoter and former ECW announcer Joel Gertner. The following night in CZW, Eddy defeated Gran Akuma, Niles Young and "Canadian Dynamite" Max Boyer in a 4-way match. Later that month, he lost to Larry Sweeney at a November 23 UWA Hardcore Wrestling show in Mississauga and, two days later, wrestled two matches in one night losing to "Canadian Crazyhorse" Michael Elgin and Jay Fenix in a tag team match with Bruno Davis at a Rough Wrestling International show; and defeating Timothy Dalton for New School Wrestling in Hamilton, Ontario. On December 2, Eddy lost to "Paranoid" Jake Matthews at an IWS show and, on December 9, lost to Hallowicked in a match to determine the number one contender to the CZW World Junior Heavyweight title.

=== Return to Montreal ===
On January 20, 2007, SeXXXy Eddy lost a match against IWS Canadian Champion Don Paysan. The following month, he lost to Pierre Carl Ouellet. In March, he made appearances for Inter Species Wrestling defeating Kenny the Bastard and King Sphinx in a three-way match on March 3; a week later, defeated Jake O'Reilly for Canadian Wrestling Revolution in Maple, Ontario.

That same month, Eddy and the Green Phantom formed "Scarred and SeXXXy" later winning the IWS Tag Team titles from The Hardcore Ninjaz in a Montreal Death match on March 24. During the next month, he appeared in New York's NWA Upstate and Oshawa, Ontario's Motor City Wrestling before losing the titles back to The Hardcore Ninjaz in a 3-way match with "The Super Smash Brothers" (Player Uno and Stupefied) on April 28. They failed to regain the titles in a rematch which included "Hi-5" (Beef Wellington and Kid Kamikaze) on May 26 and again in a No Ropes Barbed Wire match on June 16 and broke up shortly after.

SeXXXy Eddy also made appearances in IWA Texas/Anarchy Championship Wrestling working "One Man" Mike Dell; and in New School Wrestling lost to NSW Brass Knuckles Champion Timothy Dalton on June 30. In early-July, he defeated Jeremy Prophet and Green Phantom in separate matches for Motor City Wrestling. He also fought to a no-contest against "Go Time" Chris Laplante at an NWF show in Sunridge, Ontario. Later that night, he lost a 6-man tag team match with Jeremy Prophet and Inferno to Laplante, Hickster and Kryss Thorn.

Back in the IWS, Eddy lost to Kid Kamikaze on August 18 after being distracted by his former tag team partner The Green Phantom. He met the Green Phantom in a match the following month, however outside interference by local sports radio hosts cost him the match. On October 12, he entered the ALF's Amazones et Titans mixed tag team tournament with Vanessa Kraven, however they fought to a time limit draw with eXeSs and Kacey Diamond in the opening rounds.

On October 27, SeXXXy Eddy faced Kwan Chang in the main event of CGPW's Halloween Horror and lost to him after Chang used his kendo stick as a foreign object to make the pin. At RWI's "Wrestleroast" the next night, Eddy defeated Jeremy Prophet in Welland, Ontario. He later teamed with Quinson Valentino to defeat Jeremy Prophet and Kryss Thorn later on that night. On November 2, Eddy defeated "The Prince of Persia" Rahim Ali in Cornwall; and later that night, lost to Jeremy Prophet in a match for the CWA Internet-TV Championship. After the match, Eddy kissed Prophet's valet Persephony. At a show for the IWS the next night, Eddy reunited with his tag team partner LuFisto but lost to Shayne Hawke and eXeSs. Several days later at an event for Capital City Championship Combat, Eddy challenged eXeSs to a special "SeXXXy Eddy Challenge" match and lost to his rival. On November 16, Eddy defeated Brick Crawford in a match for the SWR International Championship at an SWR/NGE show in Châteauguay, Quebec. After winning the title, Eddy was attacked from behind by Jeremy Prophet who beat him for the title that night. On November 24, Eddy defeated Matt Bash at MWF's En Route Vers Extreme Hatred in Valleyfield, Quebec.

On December 1, SeXXXy Eddy and Scotty Vortekz defeated UltraMantis Black in a triple threat match to advance to the finals of the Deathmatch Tournament at 2007 IWA Deep South Carnage Cup in Pulaski, Tennessee. He lost to Freakshow in the 4-way elimination match with Scotty Vortekz and Danny Havoc. That same night, although Eddy was absent from the IWS, his valet Hottie Holly distracted LuFisto in a death match against PCP Crazy F'N Manny in order for 2.0 (Jagged and Shane Matthews) to attack her from behind. On December 5, Eddy lost to NWF Heavyweight Champion Kryss Thorn; and the following night, he defeated Razz Mansour in a match for Great Canadian Wrestling in Oshawa, Ontario. Two days later at CZW's "Cage Of Death IX", he interfered in LuFisto's match against CZW World Junior Heavyweight Champion Sabian after hitting her with a steel chair. After the match however, Sabian attacked Eddy and hugged LuFisto out of a sign of respect. Later on, Eddy lost to Whacks and Viking in a three-way Barbed Wire Tables match, after the favor was returned by an irate LuFisto. At MWF's "Extreme Hatred", Eddy lost to Alex Price (with Rickster Oz McGoth) in Valleyfield, Quebec on December 15, 2007.

=== Recent years ===
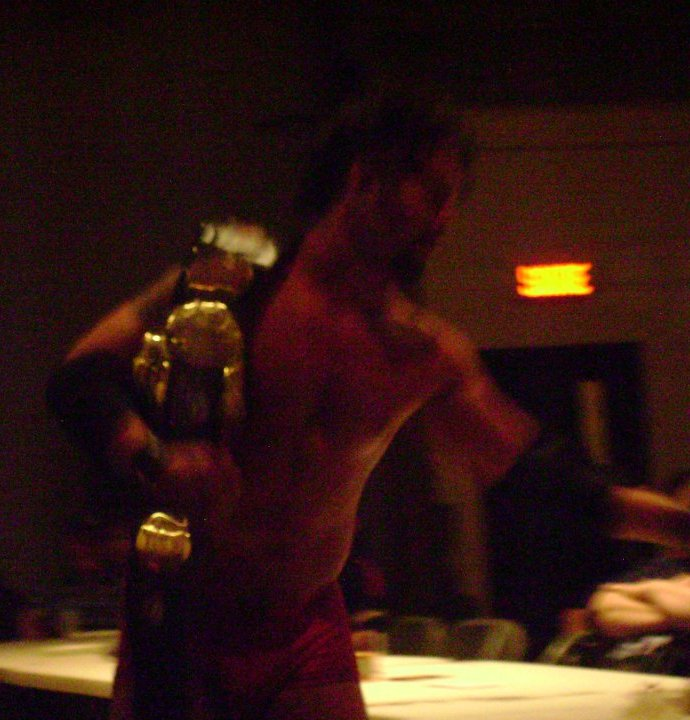
Eddy Winning the NEXT LEVEL Championship in 2012

At the CWA's New Years Bashing, SeXXXy Eddy defeated eXeSs and Kwan Chang in a three-way match in Cornwall, Ontario on January 5, 2008. On January 11, Eddy was the special guest referee at ALF's Sang Restriction in Montreal. Officiating the main event between Parfaite Caroline and Nikky Perrier, Caroline was counted out. The next night, he lost to "The Wanted Man" Ryan Dennim at an RWI show in Welland, Ontario. Eddy also appeared at C*4's Fallout on January 19 teaming with Twiggy to defeat eXeSs and Shayne Hawke in Ottawa and NWF's Experience The Revolution on January 24 defeating TNA star Cody Deaner in Barrie, Ontario. Eddy later appeared in the main event with Jeremy Prophet losing to Kryss Thorn and C.K. Sexx with the help of Ultimate Fighting Championship fighter Dave Beneteau.

Two days later at IWS Praise The Violence, SeXXXy Eddy faced his former tag team partner LuFisto in Montreal. He was accompanied by valet Hottie Hollie. He faced LuFisto again at CZW's 9 F'N Years! supercard losing to her in an Ultraviolent Domestic Dispute match in Philadelphia, Pennsylvania. A week later at IWS Violent Valentine, he and "Paranoid" Jake Matthews (with valet Lollipop) defeated Green Phantom and Kid Kamikaze. On February 23, he and Karnage (with Andy Rossetti) lost to "Aftershock" (Damian and Drake Styles) in a match for the NWA Canadian Tag Team Championship at CWA: The Return.

On March 1, Eddy appeared at IWA-Mid South's 500th Anniversary Show in Joliet, Illinois and participated in an 8-man TLC Open Contract match which involved: Ash, Ruckus, Mickie Knuckles, Devon Moore, Brandon Thomaselli, Jaysin Strife and "Diehard" Dustin Lee. Despite losing the match, Eddy won a moral victory when he kissed Mickie Knuckles. On March 14, Eddy and Anna Minoushka lost to Nikky Perrier and Mary Lee Rose at ALF's Force Excessive.

On March 22, Eddy lost to RCW's Heavyweight Champion Kaimana (with Ativalu) in the main event at RCW Night Of Glory in Saint-Sulpice, Quebec. On April 4, Eddy appeared in Paul Leduc's promotion and, in the main-event, lost to FLQ's Heavyweight Champion Spike in a four-way match with Tank and Carl Leduc in Montreal, Quebec. His valet for the night, Rachelle, was in his corner during the match. Later that week at IWA-Mid South's A Bloody Road Ahead, Eddy defeated Hydra in Indianapolis, Indiana. The next night at IWA-Mid South's April Bloodshowers, Eddy lost to Ash in a four-way match with Brian Skyline and Christin Able. On April 27, Eddy beat Jagged at C*4's Domination in Ottawa, Ontario.

On May 9, SeXXXy Eddy and Anna Minoushka lost to Beef Wellington and Charlotte Lamothe at an ALF show in Montreal. On May 24, Eddy lost to eXeSs at Freedom To Fight. He also made two more appearances in FLQ teaming with Velvet Jones to defeat Surfer and Moonlight on June 7; and with Sweet Cherry to defeat X-Ode and Josianne the Pussycat on June 13. The next night at C*4's Crossing The Line, Eddy and Xtremo defeated The Flatliners (Asylum and Matt Burns) in Ottawa. On July 19, he lost to Kevin Steen and 2.0 (Jagged and Shane Matthews) in a 6-man tag team match with Beef Wellington and Evil Ninja in the main event at IWS Summer Slaughter. The following night, he appeared at the FCL's Festi-Beach spot show to defeat Aaron Von Shwartz in Lac-à-la-Tortue, Quebec. In early 2008, Eddy appeared on the YTV series Prank Patrol, a children's series similar to MTV's Punk'd, in which he helped train an 11-year-old boy for a 2-minute wrestling match against him as a practical joke on his older cousin.

At IWS Freedom to Fight, Eddy submitted to eXeSs after being put in a side triangle choke. During the match, eXeSs forearmed Eddy so hard in the face, causing him to bleed profusely and be sent to the emergency room of a local hospital. Although the crowd had begun cheering for him during the last moments of the match, Eddy yelled at the fans for "only getting excited at the sight of his blood". On July 19, he and Beef Wellington faced 2.0 (Jagged and Shane Matthews) at IWS Summer Slaughter.

On June 6, 2010, Eddy defeated Val Venis in a match for CRW Wrestling. On November 6, 2010, SeXXXy Eddy won the CWA King of the Ring 2010 tournament, last eliminating "The Rage" Randy Berry. On December 19, 2010, Eddy defeated Thomas "The Pipes" Dubois to become the CRW Quebec Champion after winning the Talisman Championship Contract by defeating Dru Onyx. Eddy lost the CRW Quebec Championship to Mathieu St-Jacques on March 19, 2010.

In May 2011, Eddy and Jeremy Prophet lost the TOW Tag Team Championships to Dru Onyx and Carl Leduc. On May 19, 2012, SeXXXy Eddy won the NEXT LEVEL PRO WRESTLING tournament to be crowned the first NEXT LEVEL Heavyweight Champion.

At XZW 3, on October 21, 2017, in Sorel-Tracy, SeXXXy Eddy defeats Robbie E to celebrate his victory he issued an Open Challenge for XZW Big Show Champions Of Steel featuring ECW Legend Raven. The Challenge got accepted by The Wicked West of Montreal-East Kathryn Von Goth

At XZW Champions of Steel, on October 21, 2017, in Sorel-Tracy, SeXXXy Eddy defeats Kathryn Von Goth (acc. by Rickter Oz McGoth) but after the match both sides shook hands, later that night XZW Tag Team Champions Rock N' Road (Madmax & Prince Stevenson) are doing an open challenge for next event XZW 5. Which got answered by Kathryn Von Goth and SeXXXy Eddy.

At XZW 5, on November 11, 2017, in Sorel-Tracy, SeXXXy Eddy and his new partner Kathryn Von Goth (acc. by Rickter Oz McGoth) defeats XZW Tag Team Champions Rock N' Road (Madmax & Prince Stevenson) to become the new XZW Tag Team Champions

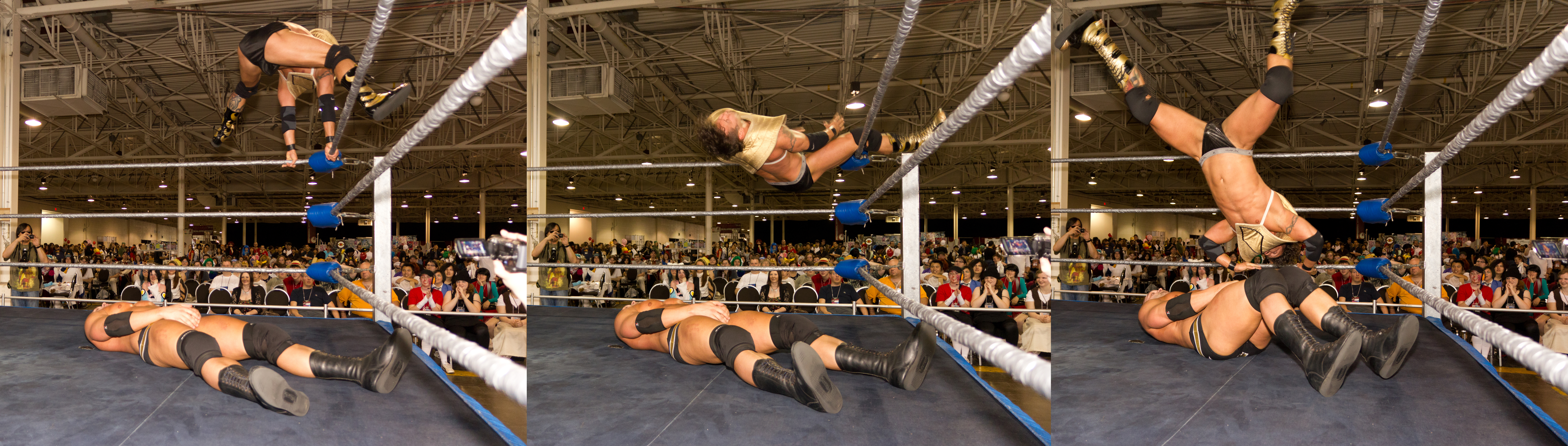
SeXXXy Eddy performing a split-legged moonsault

== Championships and accomplishments ==
- Acclaim Pro Wrestling
  - APW Tag Team Championship (1 time) - with Chaz Lovely
- Canadian Wrestling Action
  - CWA I-TV Championship (1 time)
  - CWA King of the Ring (2011)
- Combat Revolution Wrestling
  - CRW Quebec Championship (1 time)
  - CRW Talisman Championship Contract (1 time)
- Combat Zone Wrestling
  - CZW World Junior Heavyweight Championship (1 time)
  - CZW World Tag Team Championship (1 time)^{1} - with Chri$ Ca$h, Nate Webb and J.C. Bailey
- Dramatic Dream Team
  - Ironman Heavymetalweight Championship (1 time)
- Elite Wrestling Action
  - EWA Heavyweight Championship (1 time)
- Independent Wrestling Alliance - Deep South
  - IWA-DS Carnage Cup (2009)
- International Wrestling Syndicate
  - IWS World Heavyweight Championship (3 times)
  - IWS World Tag Team Championship (2 time, current) - (1 time) with The Green Phantom and (1 time) with Bob Anger
  - Tournament of the Icons (2002)
- NEXT LEVEL PRO WRESTLING
  - NEXT LEVEL Heavyweight Championship (1 time)
- Northern Championship Wrestling
  - Rookie of the Year (2000)
- Showcase Wrestling Revolution
  - SWR International Championship (1 time)
- New Wrestling Championship
  - NWC Tag Team Championship (1 time) - with "L'Exquis" FranCk Cotelli
- Pro Wrestling Illustrated
  - PWI ranked Eddy # 365 of the 500 best singles wrestlers of the PWI 500 in 2007.
- Top Of The World Wrestling
  - TOW Tag Team Championship (1 time) - with Jeremy Prophet
- Interspecies Wrestling
  - ISDUB Ultimate Tag Team Championship (1 time, current)– with Giant Tiger
  - ISW Falls Count Anywhere Championship (2 time)
- Xtreme Zone Wrestling
  - XZW Tag Team Championship (1 time) - with Kathryn Von Goth

^{1} Eddy defended the title with either Webb, Ca$h or Bailey under the Freebird Rule.
