= International Wrestling Syndicate =

Canadian professional wrestling promotion

- Acronym: IWS
- Founded: 1998
- Style: Pro Wrestling; Hardcore wrestling Lucha libre
- Headquarters: Montreal, Quebec, Canada
- Founder(s): SeXXXy Eddy; Manny Eleftheriou; Nic Paterson
- Owner: Manny Eleftheriou
- Formerly: Dawson Wrestling Federation; World Wrestling Syndicate; Internet Wrestling Syndicate

International Wrestling Syndicate (IWS) is a professional wrestling promotion based out of Montreal, Quebec, Canada. Originating from the Dawson Wrestling Federation, it was formerly known as the Internet Wrestling Syndicate and World Wrestling Syndicate.

IWS is one of the continent's longest-running promotions, while evolving into a proving ground for young talent from Quebec, Ontario and Atlantic Canada.

== History ==
=== Formation and Early years ===
In April 1998, SeXXXy Eddy organized the Dawson Wrestling Federation to perform on the grounds of Dawson College in Montreal. He became the promotion's first champion. Professional wrestling was banned from being performed on Dawson College property following the events of April 23, 1999, when SeXXXy Eddy and PCP Crazy F'N Manny introduced foreign objects in a multi-competitor match.

Eddy joined with Manny Elefthriou and Nic Paterson to form the World Wrestling Syndicate. WWS had their first show Blood, Sweat & Beers at Wally's on June 17, 1999. The last WWS show was Praise the Violence on April 8, 2000.

=== As the Internet Wrestling Syndicate ===
In 2000, the promotion was renamed Internet Wrestling Syndicate, as Manny partnered with Wild Rose Productions, a Montreal-based Internet adult entertainment company owned by Carol Cox. The first IWS show Change, was held at Just For Laughs Cabaret on November 10, featuring PCP Crazy F'N Manny versus Danny Dallas, in the first of only three No-Rope Barbed Wire matches in IWS history.

IWS held its first seasonal Medley show at Praise the Violence on March 31, 2001. On May 25, IWS began promoting shows at Le Skratch in Laval, becoming its primary venue for the next two years. Two months later, at Un F'N Sanctioned, Hardcore Ninjaz faced PCP Crazy F'N Manny and The Green Phantom in the first IWS Fans Bring The Weapons Match. On November 10 at Born to Bleed, Justice Pain defeated Hardcore Ninja #1 and Hardcore Ninja #2 in a Triple Threat Match, retaining his CZW World Heavyweight Championship.

In Spring 2002, IWS inaugurated the IWS Tag Team Championship with the Extreme Dream Tag Team Tournament. The tournament was won by Maxx Fury & Hardcore Ninja #1, on March 16 at Extreme Dream Part 2. On May 18, at Freedom To Fight, The Green Phantom won his first IWS Heavyweight Championship in a 4-Way Elimination Match; defeating PCP Crazy F'N Manny, The Arsenal and SeXXXy Eddy. On July 14 at Scarred For Life, "The Generic Luchador" El Generico made his wrestling debut in a count out victory.

On August 16, 2003, Pierre Carl Ouellet (PCO) and Kevin Steen made their IWS debuts at Born to Bleed. On October 18, at Blood, Sweat and Beers, PCO defeated El Generico and Kevin Steen in a Triple Threat Match. On November 15 at Payback's A Bitch, El Generico defeated Kevin Steen in their first-ever singles match against each other. On December 13 at Season's Beatings, IWS held the last show of its first-run at Le Skratch.

On June 15, 2004 at Le SPAG, IWS held its 5th anniversary show "V", where Sid Vicious made his in-ring return from having suffered his near career-ending injury in WCW. During the event, El Generico defeated PCO in an IWS Title Match for his first IWS Heavyweight Championship, only to have Kevin Steen claim his #1 contendership won earlier that night against Excess 69. Kevin Steen defeated El Generico, also winning his first IWS Heavyweight Championship.

Kevin Steen's first title reign in 2004, marked a pivotal milestone in the history of the promotion when he became the first IWS Heavyweight Champion to internationally defend the title, defeating Roderick Strong on October 30 in New Jersey at JAPW. These events and various upcoming plans of expansion led the promotion to be renamed the International Wrestling Syndicate, coincidentally acknowledging Montreal's professional wrestling territorial era via Lutte Internationale.

=== As the International Wrestling Syndicate ===
==== 2005 to 2010 ====
At Un F'N Sanctioned on March 26, 2005, The Green Phantom defeated Chris Hero, Beef Wellington beat Super Dragon, and Franky The Mobster defeated Kevin Steen for both the CZW Iron Man and IWS World Heavyweight Championships at the Medley. At Freedom to Fight on July 9, IWS held its first international event and only cage match, when SeXXXy Eddy won the IWS World Heavyweight Championship in a 4-Way Elimination Cage Match at Viking Hall in Philadelphia. On July 23, IWS inaugurated the IWS Canadian Championship with preliminary matches for Extreme Dream Tournament II. On August 20, Chris Bishop defeated El Generico in the Extreme Dream Tournament Final Match for the IWS Canadian Championship.

On June 3, 2006 at Un F'N Sanctioned, Sabu worked his (then) last independent match teaming with PCO defeating The Green Phantom and Dru Onyx, 48 hours prior to debuting on WWE Raw. On July 29 at Summer Slaughter, Max Boyer won the Extreme Dream Tournament Final in a 6-Way Elimination Match. On August 8 at Breakout, Viking defeated Excess in an IWS World Heavyweight Title vs. Career Match.

On March 24, 2007 at Un F'N Sanctioned, Christian Cage & Max Boyer defeated PCO & Jake Matthews. On September 22 at Blood, Sweat & Beers, Kevin Steen defeated Jay Briscoe, while The Dudley Boyz (renouncing to being billed as Team 3D during the event) and Franky The Mobster beat PCO, Paranoid Jake Matthews and Brick Crawford. On November 3 at Freedom to Fight, Christopher Daniels defeated IWS Canadian Champion Max Boyer in a Non-Title Match.

On February 16, 2008 at Violent Valentine, El Generico defeated Kevin Steen for the IWS World Heavyweight Championship. On March 22 at Know Your Enemies, Kevin Steen regained the IWS World Heavyweight Championship, defeating Max Boyer and El Generico in a 3-Way Match. On May 24 at Freedom to Fight, Kevin Steen became the first to hold two IWS titles simultaneously, when he defeated Max Boyer in an IWS Championship Unification Match. On September 27 at Un F'N Sanctioned, Excess beat Shayne Hawke for the vacant IWS Canadian Championship in the Extreme Dream Tournament Final Match, while Kevin Steen retained the IWS World Heavyweight Championship against Joey Mercury.

On January 10, 2009 at Season's Beatings, The Green Phantom defeated "Big Rig" Brodie Lee in a Christmas Tree Deathmatch. On May 30, IWS celebrated its 10th anniversary "X" at the Medley, where Kevin Nash made his return to Montreal in a losing effort against PCO in a Grudge Match, concluding a genuine rivalry originating from subsequent WWE matches in Montreal & Quebec City in 1995.

IWS held its (then) final show on October 9, 2010 at Club Soda, featuring IWS originals SeXXXy Eddy, PCP Crazy F'N Manny, The Arsenal and IWS World Heavyweight Champion The Green Phantom in a Fans Bring The Weapons Match.

==== Revival ====
In early 2014, IWS announced its return in May at the Plaza Theatre. At Praise the Violence, on May 10, Shayne Hawke won the vacant IWS Canadian Championship in a 4-Way Match. At XV:15 FKN Years on August 23, IWS celebrated its 15th anniversary, featuring Tommy Dreamer. On September 20 at Scarred 4 Life, "Speedball" Mike Bailey won the IWS World Heavyweight Championship against The Green Phantom.

At Un F'N Sanctioned on March 28, 2015 at Corona Theatre, Mike Bailey defeated Hallowicked and Jesse Neal in a Triple Threat Match. On September 5 at Scarred 4 Life, Vampiro returned to Montreal after 30 years since making his pro wrestling debut in Quebec, and Mike Bailey retained the IWS World Heavyweight Championship against Jack Evans.

On March 5, 2016 at Un F'N Sanctioned held at Métropolis, Black Dynomite won the IWS World Heavyweight Championship in a 4-Way Match versus Rey Mysterio, Jack Evans and Mike Bailey. On May 28 at Bloodstream: Vol. 2, Hardcore Ninjaz won the Tag Team Invitational Gauntlet Match for the IWS World Tag Team Championship.

On February 4, 2017 at Freedom To Fight, Scott Parker defeated Black Dynomite in an IWS Championship Unification Match. On August 5 at Scarred 4 Life, Stefany Sinclair became the first-ever IWS Women's Champion and TDT (Tabarnak De Team) successfully defended the IWS World Tag Team Championship against The Young Bucks. At First Blood on November 4, Franky TM faced Johnny Mundo to a no-contest. At Season's Beatings on December 2, Big Magic won the IWS World Heavyweight Championship in a 4-Way Elimination Match.

On January 20, 2018 at Freedom To Fight, WWE United Kingdom Champion Pete Dunne fought IWS Canadian Champion Matt Angel to a no-contest. On March 3 at Un F'N Sanctioned, Matt Angel successfully defended the IWS Canadian Championship versus "Flying" Frank Milano and Rob Van Dam. On April 28 at Unstoppable, TDT and Buxx Belmar defeated Les Brasseurs with Scott Parker and British Strong Style. On July 14 at Hardcore Heat, PCO defeated WALTER in a rematch to their critically acclaimed confrontation at Joey Janela's Spring Break 2. On October 6 at British Strong Style, Moustache Mountain defeated TDT for the IWS World Tag Team Championship.

On March 23, 2019, IWS celebrated its 20th anniversary with Un F'N Sanctioned at MTelus, where Tajiri with Mikey Whipwreck defeated Mike Bailey, while also featuring Little Guido, Wolfgang, Darby Allin and DJZ. On April 6, IWS presented Unstoppable at White Eagle Hall in Jersey City, as Addy Starr defeated Solo Darling and Veda Scott in the first IWS Women's Championship international contest, and The Green Phantom defeated Nick Gage and Matt Tremont in a Hardcore Match. On April 27 at Freedom To Fight, Sheldon Jean defeated Ethan Page, and TDT defeated Santana and Ortiz. On November 8 at One Night Only, TDT defeated Private Party in an IWS World Tag Team Championship Match.

On February 8, 2020 at Praise the Violence, Matt Angel defeated Mike Bailey in an IWS World Heavyweight Championship Ladder Match. Un F'N Sanctioned was scheduled to be presented on March 21 at Club Soda, featuring the return of former IWS World Tag Team Champions Moustache Mountain, Rey Horus, and NXT Cruiserweight Champion Jordan Devlin, until being indefinitely postponed due to the COVID-19 pandemic.

On September 4, 2021 at Blood, Sweat & Beers held at MTelus, generational phenom Zak Patterson made his IWS debut in an IWS Canadian Title Match, while Mike Bailey defeated Matt Angel in an IWS World Heavyweight Title Match winning his second IWS World Heavyweight Championship. On October 16 at Scarred 4 Life, Veda Scott defeated Addy Starr for the IWS World Women's Championship.

On March 12, 2022, Un F'N Sanctioned Part 2.0 at MTelus, featured the return of 2.0 (representing the Jericho Appreciation Society). IWS held its Biggest Show Ever at Scarred 4 Life, on August 6 at L'Olympia, where Mike Bailey defeated Joey Janela, Mel Havok became IWS World Women's Champion against Ruby Soho, Kristara and Veda Scott. On October 15 at Freedom To Fight, Minoru Suzuki defeated Kevin Blanchard in his first Canadian appearance. On December 3 at Season's Beatings, IWGP World Heavyweight Champion Jay White defeated Zak Patterson.

On January 21, 2023 at Praise the Violence, Casanova Productions (Shayne Hawke and JT Producer, with Matt Viviani) defeated Black Quebecois for the IWS World Tag Team Championship, Benjamin Tull retained the IWS World Heavyweight Championship against Effy, while post-match Mance Warner attacked PCP Crazy F'N Manny in the name of GCW. On March 11, at IWS vs GCW: Un F'N Sanctioned, Mike Bailey defeated Gringo Loco, Tull successfully defended the IWS World Heavyweight Championship against Tony Deppen, while Nick Gage, Rina Yamashita, and Mance Warner defeated SeXXXy Eddy, Green Phantom, and PCP Crazy F'N Manny in a Fans Bring The Weapons Match. On May 27 at First Blood, Amazingly Sweet (Kristara and Alex Maze) defeated Casanova Productions for IWS World Tag Team Championship, while TDT beat Wasted Youth (Marcus Mathers and Dyln McKay). On July 15 at Scarred 4 Life, Jordan Oliver successfully defended his JCW World Championship against Karl Jepson, Maki Itoh beat Vanessa Kraven, while LuFisto and PCP Crazy F'N Manny defeated BUSSY (Allie Katch and Effy) at L'Olympia. On August 5 at Hardcore Heat, Matt Viviani defeated Green Phantom for the IWS Canadian Championship, Fresh Air (Macrae Martin and Junior Benito) beat Amazingly Sweet for the IWS World Tag Team Championship, Katrina Creed won the IWS World Women's Championship against Mel Havok, while Tull defeated Ben Ortmanns in an IWS World Heavyweight Championship Match. On October 28 at Freedom To Fight, Benjamin Tull defeated Aiden Prince at Studio TD.

On January 20, 2024 at Praise the Violence, Tull defeated James Stone, Karl Jepson and Rina Yamashita in an IWS World Heavyweight Championship Four Way Match. On March 2, IWS celebrated its 25th anniversary with Un F'N Sanctioned at L'Olympia, where the Bay City Choir Boys (Judas & Seth Cassidy) defeated Amazingly Sweet and Dynasty (Jaxon Roy & Mikey Truth) in a Three Way Match for the vacant IWS World Tag Team Championship, Karl Jepson beat Tull for the IWS World Heavyweight Championship, while Green Phantom, Mathieu St-Jacques, PCP Crazy F'N Manny & SeXXXy Eddy defeated BUSSY (Allie Katch & Effy), Jimmy Lloyd & Joey Janela in Ultimate Death. On May 4 at Freedom To Fight, Karl Jepson successfully defended the IWS World Heavyweight Championship against Ben Ortmanns. On July 7, IWS and GCW presents IWS vs GCW: Scarred 4 Life at L'Olympia, featuring PCP Crazy F'N Manny vs Nick Gage.

== Shows and TV tapings ==
The promotion gained global exposure during the late 1990s and early 2000s wrestling boom, by streaming video on demand on a monthly show entitled Bloodstream; it has also been featured on Playboy TV, Fight Network and Viewer's Choice Canada on pay-per-view.

IWS has run spot shows for outdoor events such as the Montreal Fringe Festival, Warped Tour, '77 Montreal and Heavy MONTRÉAL.

Their shows are currently jointly promoted with entertainment event promoter Evenko, distributed on DVD through Smart Mark Video & RF Video, merchandising with Pro Wrestling Tees, and available on video on demand with Triller TV.

=== La Lutte à RDS on RDS ===
On September 2, 2017, IWS announced production of a pre-recorded television program for RDS. The first TV tapings of the four episode experimental deal, was held at Blood, Sweat & Beers at Club Unity on October 7, 2017. The first RDS2 broadcast of the monthly program La Lutte à RDS, aired on October 22, 2017. On February 22, 2018, IWS announced a year-long extension with RDS. In early 2019, RDS indefinitely renewed its programming of La Lutte à RDS on RDS2. On October 22, 2020, IWS debuted on the television network's primary feed. RDS aired the final episode of La Lutte à RDS on March 28, 2021.

=== Bloodstream on Fight Network ===
IWS announced on April 12, 2019, production of a pre-recorded television program for Fight Network. The first tapings were held at Freedom To Fight at Club Unity on April 27, 2019. The first broadcast of the bimonthly program Bloodstream, aired on September 13, 2019. On October 4, 2019, Bloodstream premiered on Fight Network UK. On January 6, 2020, IWS announced a broadcast deal with Fight Network USA.

=== Hardcore History on Fight Network ===
On January 10, 2022, IWS announced production of a second pre-recorded television program for Fight Network entitled IWS Hardcore History, a watch-along series featuring the greatest matches and moments in the promotion's storied history.

=== IWS on FITE+ ===
On June 8, 2023, FITE announced that IWS joined the FITE+ SVOD subscription platform. This included both live and archived events, including its weekly show Bloodstream. IWS aired its first live event Scarred 4 Life on July 15, 2023.

== Women's Wrestling Syndicate ==
Women's Wrestling Syndicate (WWS) is an all-women's professional wrestling promotion based out of Montreal, Quebec, Canada. WWS was founded by the IWS and LuFisto on November 30, 2023. The promotion is promoted and executive produced by Hall of Famer LuFisto.

In August 2022, IWS was featured for spotlighting its Women's division, providing a platform for multicultural and 2SLGBTQ+ athletes, and promoting a zero-tolerance policy toward discrimination and harassment at its events and IWS Training Centre.

On November 17, 2023, LuFisto with IWS and SPIRA, produced an all-women's spot show for the world premiere of Celles qui luttent, directed by Sarah Baril Gaudet, for the Montreal International Documentary Festival, held at the Cinémathèque québécoise.

On February 4, 2024, WWS held its inaugural event Caught in a Mosh at the IWS Training Centre, where Katrina Creed defeated Mya Malek in an IWS Women's Championship Match. On March 24, WWS presents Fight for your Life, Fight for your Money at the IWS Training Centre, featuring Vanessa Kraven.

== Training Centre and Dojo ==
IWS runs a professional wrestling school in Montréal, Québec. In late 2014, the promotion inaugurated the IWS Dojo in a MMA training facility in LaSalle. The schools are currently located at the IWS Training Centre in Montréal-Nord and IWS South Shore in Saint-Jean-sur-Richelieu. Shayne Hawke operates as head trainer of the school.

The school has presented seminars by wrestlers such as WWE Hall of Famer Jake "The Snake" Roberts, "Speedball" Mike Bailey, Bob Evans, Pete Dunne, Trent Seven, Tyler Bate, Mike Quackenbush, Tessa Blanchard, Gabe Sapolsky, and UFC Hall of Famer Stephan Bonnar.

Former Canadian strongman, Maxim Lemire credited the IWS Training Centre in preparation to his WWE tryout, held during SummerSlam weekend in Toronto.

On August 24–25, 2019, IWS hosted Mike Quackenbush's Master Class Weekend.

== International partnerships ==
IWS has collaborated with various international wrestling promotions including Combat Zone Wrestling, Jersey All Pro Wrestling, Chikara, Westside Xtreme Wrestling, Game Changer Wrestling, Pro Wrestling Guerrilla, DDT Pro-Wrestling, Ring of Honor, AAA, New Japan Pro-Wrestling, AEW and WWE. In the past, IWS shows have had international championships defended on them and on some occasions, wrestlers have held both IWS and international championships simultaneously.

On July 24, 2004, SeXXXy Eddy, The Green Phantom, Evil Ninja & The Arsenal entered the CZW Tournament of Death III. In the semi-finals, Eddy defeated The Arsenal in a Light Tube Ropes & Corners Match, where he cut an artery in his left forearm, thereby forfeiting the final 3-Way with Necro Butcher & Wifebeater. On September 11 at High Stakes II, SeXXXy Eddy defeated Kevin Steen, El Generico & Excess 69 in an IWS 4-Way Match, which was unofficially chosen as "CZW Match of the Year". At Season's Beatings on December 18, Gran Akuma, Mike Quackenbush and Shane Storm defeated Jack Marciano and The Dark Breed (Hallowicked, UltraMantis Black).

On February 5, 2005 the IWS Tag Team Championship was first contested internationally in a 4-Way Elimination Match, when The Flying Hurricanes successfully defended their title at CZW Only The Strong: Scarred 4 Life held in Pennsylvania. On February 19, 2005, El Generico took part in the Tag World Grand Prix, where he teamed with Kevin Steen as Team IWS.

On February 26, 2006, SeXXXy Eddy teamed with Kevin Steen as Team IWS in the Tag World Grand Prix. On June 23, Max Boyer entered the Young Lions Cup IV tournament, defeating Brandon Thomaselli in his first round match. On October 28, Boyer defeated Arik Cannon in a return singles match to win the Young Lions Cup. Boyer was forced to vacate the title in time for the fifth annual Young Lions Cup tournament.

On January 20, 2007, El Generico was named at Praise the Violence the IWS representative for both the King of Europe Cup and wXw 16 Carat Gold Tournament. On February 17, Max Boyer teamed with fellow IWS performers Scott Parker and Shane Matthews in the first ever King of Trios tournament.

On February and March 2008, El Generico took part in the King of Trios, where he teamed with Player Uno and Stupefied as Team IWS. On November 7 at ROH The French Connection, Stupefied defeated The Green Phantom, Excess & Dan Paysan in an IWS 4-Way Dark Match.

On July 4, 2015, IWS announced a talent partnership with AAA and Lucha Underground. IWS clashed with CZW at Freedom to Fight on October 17 at Le Skratch in Laval, where the IWS Canadian Championship, CZW World Tag Team Championship and CZW World Heavyweight Championship titles were successfully defended.

On September 9, 2018, Mike Bailey defeated Psicosis and Argenis in a 3-Way Dance, at an IWS vs AAA spot show for the Montreal Mercado del Taco.

On April 6, 2019, IWS presented Unstoppable, as part of GCW's The Collective. On October 12, in response to WWE pulling Moustache Mountain from their scheduled appearance, IWS announced TDT vs a surprise tag team from AEW at One Night Only, on November 8 at Club Unity. On October 24, IWS announced Private Party vs TDT in an IWS World Tag Team Championship Match at One Night Only.

In 2022, many IWS wrestlers were featured as extras for both AEW and WWE. Zak Patterson and Ben Ortmanns appeared in segments featuring Ronda Rousey on WWE SmackDown, while JT Producer was in a 2-on-1 Handicap Match vs Omos on WWE Raw in Edmonton. Zak Patterson, Shayne Hawke and JT Producer faced The Dark Order (Evil Uno, Alex Reynolds, 10, John Silver) on AEW Dark in Toronto. On December 3 at Season's Beatings, PCP Crazy F'N Manny was reminiscing about IWS' various accomplishments, when Nick Gage appeared on-screen to declare a GCW invasion versus IWS, with two Canadian events later confirmed to be held in Montreal and Toronto in March 2023.

On March 5, 2023 at GCW: Ransom in Atlantic City, TDT, SeXXXy Eddy and Green Phantom interfered and attacked Second Gear Crew (Mance Warner, 1 Called Manders), when Mike Bailey sided with IWS, Nick Gage brought out the locker room chasing off the IWS. On March 19, IWS co-produced GCW: Worst Behavior at The Opera House in Toronto, where Matt Cardona beat SeXXXy Eddy, Rina Yamashita defeated LuFisto, and Masha Slamovich retained the GCW World Championship against Mike Bailey.

On July 5, 2024, IWS & GCW presents GCW: Worst Behavior at The Opera House in Toronto, featuring Nick Gage & Bussy vs SeXXXy Eddy, Green Phantom & PCP Crazy F'N Manny.

== Championships ==
=== Current champions ===
| Championship: | Champion(s): | Previous: | Date won: | Days: | Location: |
|---|---|---|---|---|---|
| IWS World Heavyweight Championship | Kristara | Karl Jepson | October 12, 2024 | 757+ | Montreal, Quebec, Canada |
| IWS World Tag Team Championship | Bay City Choir Boys (Judas and Seth Cassidy) | (vacant) | March 2, 2024 | 981+ | Montréal, Québec, Canada |
| IWS Canadian Championship | Matt Viviani | The Green Phantom | August 5, 2023 | 1,191+ | Montréal, Québec, Canada |
| IWS World Women's Championship | Kristara | Masha Slamovich | December 21, 2024 | 687+ | Montréal, Québec, Canada |

== IWS World Heavyweight Championship ==
=== Reigns ===
As of November 8, 2026

Key
| No. | Overall reign number |
| Reign | Reign number for the specific champion |
| Days | Number of days held |
| Defenses | Number of successful defenses |
| + | Current reign is changing daily |

| No. | Champion | Championship change | | | Reign statistics | | | Notes | Ref. |
| No. | Champion | Date | Event | Location | Reign | Days | Defenses | Notes | Ref. |
|---|---|---|---|---|---|---|---|---|---|
| 1 | SeXXXy Eddy | April 1, 1998 | N/A | N/A | 1 | 387 | N/A | SeXXXy Eddy is recognized as the first ever IWS World Heavyweight Champion, but the exact length of the reign in uncertain | |
| 2 | Maxx Fury | April 23, 1999 | N/A | Montreal, Quebec | 1 | 55 | 0 | | |
| 3 | TNT | June 17, 1999 | WWS Blood, Sweat & Beers 1999 | Montreal, Quebec | 1 | 135 | 0 | This was a triple threat match also involving Franky The Mobster | |
| 4 | SeXXXy Eddy | October 30, 1999 | WWS Payback's a B*tch | Montreal, Quebec | 2 | 161 | 0 | | |
| 5 | Ravage | April 8, 2000 | WWS Praise The Violence | Montreal, Quebec | 1 | <1 | 0 | | |
| 6 | Nixon Stratus | April 8, 2000 | IWS Change | Montreal, Quebec | 1 | 357 | 1 | | |
| 7 | PCP Crazy F'N Manny | March 31, 2001 | IWS Praise The Violence 2001 | Montreal, Quebec | 1 | 189 | 0 | | |
| 8 | SeXXXy Eddy | October 6, 2001 | IWS Yesterday Don't Mean Sh*t | Montreal, Quebec | 3 | 224 | 2 | Crazy F'N Manny defended the title in a tag team match while teaming up with The Green Phantom. SeXXXy Eddy teamed up with The Arsenal but pinned Manny to win the match and the title as well. | |
| 9 | The Green Phantom | May 18, 2002 | IWS Freedom To Fight | Laval, Quebec | 1 | 301 | 3 | This was a four-way elimination match also involving PCP Crazy F'N Manny and The Arsenal | |
| 10 | Dru Onyx | March 15, 2003 | IWS Know Your Wnemies | Laval, Quebec | 1 | 154 | 4 | This was a Two-out-of-three falls match in which Onyx defeated Phantom score 2-1 | |
| 11 | The Arsenal | August 16, 2003 | IWS Born To Bleed 2003 | Laval, Quebec | 1 | 154 | 3 | | |
| 12 | Pierre Carl Ouellet | January 17, 2004 | IWS Praise The Violence 2004 | Montreal, Quebec | 1 | 150 | 2 | | |
| 13 | El Generico | June 15, 2004 | IWS V | Montreal, Quebec | 1 | <1 | 0 | | |
| 14 | Kevin Steen | June 15, 2004 | IWS V | Montreal, Quebec | 1 | 158 | 6 | | |
| 15 | Franky The Mobster | November 20, 2004 | IWS Born To Bleed | Montreal, Quebec | 1 | 231 | 7 | This was a six pack challenge elimination match also involving El Generico, Pierre Carl Ouellet, Kurt Lauderdale and eXceSs | |
| 16 | SeXXXy Eddy | July 9, 2005 | IWS Freedom To Fight | Philadelphia, Pennsylvania | 4 | 42 | 3 | This was a four-way match also involving Evil Ninja and The Arsenal | |
| 17 | eXceSs | August 20, 2005 | IWS Extreme Dream II | Montreal, Quebec | 1 | 322 | 7 | | |
| 18 | Viking | July 8, 2006 | IWS Breakout 2006 | Montreal, Quebec | 1 | 441 | 9 | | |
| 19 | PCP Crazy F'N Manny | September 22, 2007 | IWS Blood, Sweat & Beers 2007 | Montreal, Quebec | 2 | 126 | 2 | | |
| 20 | Kevin Steen | January 26, 2008 | IWS Praise The Violence 2008 | Montreal, Quebec | 2 | 21 | 0 | | |
| 21 | El Generico | February 16, 2008 | IWS Violent Valentine 2008 | Montreal, Quebec | 2 | 35 | 0 | | |
| 22 | Kevin Steen | March 22, 2008 | IWS Know Your Enemies 2008 | Montreal, Quebec | 3 | 294 | 5 | This was a triple threat match also involving Max Boyer | |
| 23 | Beef Wellington | January 10, 2009 | IWS Seasons Beatings 2009 | Montreal, Quebec | 1 | 420 | 3 | | |
| 24 | The Green Phantom | March 6, 2010 | IWS Praise The Violence 2010 | Laval, Quebec | 2 | 1,659 | 6 | | |
| 25 | Mike Bailey | September 20, 2014 | IWS Scarred For Life 2014 | Montreal, Quebec | 1 | 532 | 5 | | |
| 26 | Black Dynomite | March 5, 2016 | IWS Un F'n Sanctioned 2016 | Montreal, Quebec | 1 | 336 | 3 | This was a four-way match also involving Rey Mysterio and Jack Evans | |
| 27 | Scott Parker | February 4, 2017 | IWS Freedom To Fight 2017 | Montreal, Quebec | 1 | 301 | 2 | Parker's IWS Canadian title was also on the line | |
| 28 | Big Magic | December 2, 2017 | IWS Seasons Beatings 2017 | Montreal, Quebec | 1 | 91 | 0 | | |
| 29 | Buxx Belmar | March 3, 2018 | IWS Un F'n Sanctioned 2018 | Montreal, Quebec | 1 | 385 | 7 | | |
| 30 | Benjamin Tull | March 23, 2019 | IWS Un F'n Sanctioned 2019 | Montreal, Quebec | 1 | 182 | 2 | | |
| 31 | Matt Angel | September 21, 2019 | IWS Blood, Sweat & Beers 2019 | Montreal, Quebec | 1 | 714 | 2 | Angel defeated Tull, Eddy and Excess in a 4-Way Match | |
| 32 | Mike Bailey | September 4, 2021 | IWS Blood, Sweat & Beers 2021 | Montreal, Quebec | 2 | 294 | 3 | | |
| 33 | Matt Falco | June 25, 2022 | IWS Hardcore Heat 2022 | Montreal, Quebec | 1 | 112 | 1 | | |
| 34 | Benjamin Tull | October 15, 2022 | IWS Freedom To Fight 2022 | Montreal, Quebec | 2 | 504 | 8 | | |
| 35 | Karl Jepson | March 2, 2024 | IWS vs GCW: Un F'n Sanctioned 25th Anniversary Show | Montreal, Quebec | 1 | 224 | 2 | | |
| 36 | Kristara | October 12, 2024 | IWS Know Your Enemies 2024 | Montreal, Quebec | 1 | 757+ | 4 | | |

=== Combined reigns ===
As of November 8, 2026

| † | Indicates the current champion |

| Rank | Wrestler | No. of reigns | Combined defenses | Combined days |
|---|---|---|---|---|
| 1 | The Green Phantom | 2 | 9 | 1960 |
| 2 | Mike Bailey | 2 | 8 | 826 |
| 3 | SeXXXy Eddy | 4 | 5 | 814 |
| 4 | Matt Angel | 1 | 2 | 714 |
| 5 | Benjamin Tull | 2 | 10 | 686 |
| 6 | Kevin Steen | 3 | 11 | 473 |
| 7 | Viking | 1 | 9 | 441 |
| 8 | Beef Wellington | 1 | 3 | 420 |
| 9 | Buxx Belmar | 1 | 7 | 385 |
| 10 | Nixon Stratus | 1 | 1 | 357 |
| 11 | Black Dynomite | 1 | 3 | 336 |
| 12 | eXceSs | 1 | 7 | 322 |
| 13 | PCP Crazy F'N Manny | 2 | 2 | 315 |
| 14 | Scott Parker | 1 | 2 | 301 |
| 15 | Franky The Mobster | 1 | 7 | 231 |
| 16 | Karl Jepson | 1 | 2 | 224 |
| 17 | Dru Onyx | 1 | 4 | 154 |
| 18 | The Arsenal | 1 | 3 | 154 |
| 19 | Pierre Carl Ouellet | 1 | 2 | 150 |
| 20 | TNT | 1 | 0 | 135 |
| 21 | Kristara † | 1 | 2 | 757+ |
| 22 | Matt Falco | 1 | 1 | 112 |
| 23 | Big Magic | 1 | 0 | 91 |
| 24 | Maxx Fury | 1 | 0 | 55 |
| 25 | El Generico | 2 | 0 | 35 |
| 26 | Ravage | 1 | 0 | <1 |

== Alumni ==
IWS has been home to many notable independent wrestlers, such as Kevin Steen, El Generico, Pierre Carl Ouellet, 2.0 (Scott Parker & Shane Matthews), Vanessa Kraven, Super Smash Brothers (Player Uno & Stupefied), "Speedball" Mike Bailey, LuFisto, Franky The Mobster, Tabarnak De Team (Mathieu St-Jacques & Thomas Dubois), "Dirty" Buxx Belmar, Matt Angel, Shayne Hawke, Beef Wellington, The Green Phantom, Max Boyer & SeXXXy Eddy.

== Awards ==
- Quebec Wrestling Awards
  - Promotion of the Year (2002, 2003, 2006, 2007, 2008, 2021)
- Cult MTL Best of MTL readers poll
  - Best Wrestling Federation or Event (2018)

== Other media ==
IWS has been featured on newscasts for CTV News and Global News; newspapers such as Montreal Gazette, Journal de Montréal, La Presse, Cult MTL and Ottawa Sun; national Canadian magazines such as Maclean's and Maisonneuve; on TSN 690, CKAC, CHOM-FM and CJAD radio; and at Montreal Comiccon. According to VICE, "No one comes close to the sheer insanity of the International Wrestling Syndicate."

On March 29, 2017, BOOM! Studios released WrestleMania 2017 Special, featuring the origins of Kevin Owens and Sami Zayn in IWS, as written by Andy Belanger & Andrew Stott, with art by Andy Belanger.

On July 4, 2017, WWE released Fight Owens Fight – The Kevin Owens Story on DVD and Blu-ray, featuring Kevin Owens' career in IWS.

On August 6, 2017, IWS was featured in Missed Connections, episode 65 of Being The Elite, with cameos by Kevin Owens and Sami Zayn.

From August to mid-October 2020, IWS was featured in the Plateau-Mont-Royal borough, in a series of professional wrestling photography on municipal displays entitled À-bras-le-corps, by storyteller and photographer André Lemelin, in collaboration with Odace Événements, Société de développement de l'Avenue du Mont-Royal and the Government of Canada.

On September 12, 2020, IWS was included in the tap based mobile game Indie Wrestler, produced by Arren Marketing Ltd., available on both Google Play and iOS Stores.

An IWS and Production Triskel co-production entitled Eating A Beating (Manger une volée), starring Benjamin Tull, Mathieu Laframboise, Brad Alekxis and directed by Dany Foster, was scheduled for film festival circuit release throughout 2021.

On March 4, 2022, IWS and Brutopia launched Green Phantom's Get with the Green citrus ale beer. On April 23, IWS and Lagabière released Lagablonde IWS blonde ale beer, featuring artwork by comic book artist Andy Belanger, with proceeds going to Tree Canada.

On February 21, 2024, Generation Iron Network announced production of a documentary providing an unprecedented behind-the-scenes look into IWS and chronicling its 25 year history. Distributed by The Vladar Company, executive produced by Manny Eleftheriou and Andrew Stott, directed by Vlad Yudin, production began on March 2, 2024, at the IWS 25th anniversary event Un F'N Sanctioned.

Mad Dogs, Midgets and Screw Jobs: The Untold Story of How Montreal Shaped the World of Wrestling; Bertrand Hébert, Pat Laprade.

Too Sweet: Inside the Indie Wrestling Revolution; Keith Elliot Greenberg.
