= NCW Triple Crown Championship =

Professional wrestling championship

Details
- Promotion: Northern Championship Wrestling
- Date established: December 15, 2007
- Date retired: October 15, 2016
Statistics
- First champion(s): Chakal
- Final champion(s): James Stone
- Most reigns: Mark Andrews and Leon Saver (3 times)
- Longest reign: Leon Saver (224 days)
- Shortest reign: Brad Alekxis and James Stone (<1 day)

The NCW Triple Crown Championship was a title contested in the Canadian wrestling promotion Northern Championship. It was created on December 15, 2007 when the NCW X-Treme Championship and NCW Cruiserweight Championship were unified in a 6-way ladder match. It was retired on October 15, 2016 upon James Stone winning the title.

== Title history ==
#	Order in reign history
Reign	The reign number for the specific set of wrestlers listed
Event	The event promoted by the respective promotion in which the titles were won
—	Used for vacated reigns so as not to count it as an official reign
<1	Indicates reign is less than one day
+	Indicates the current reign is changing daily

No.	Champion	Reign	Date	Days held	Location	Notes	Ref
1	Chakal	1	December 15, 2007	85	Montreal, Quebec	Defeated NCW X-Treme Champion Black Eagle, NCW Cruiserweight Champion Binovich Fouranov, Anna Minoushka, Busty Love, and Mark Andrews in 6-way ladder match to unify both titles.	
2	Busty Love	1	March 9, 2008	69	Montreal, Quebec		
3	Jake Matthews	1	May 17, 2008	105	Montreal, Quebec	Defeated Busty Love and Bam Bam Blues in 3-way match.	
4	Mark Andrews	1	August 30, 2008	161	Montreal, Quebec	Defeated Matthews, Haiduk, and Busty Love in a 4-way match.	
5	Busty Love	2	February 7, 2009	49	Montreal, Quebec	Teams with James Stone to defeat Andrews & Jay Phenomenon.	
6	Mark Andrews	2	March 28, 2009	49	Montreal, Quebec		
7	Urban Miles	1	May 16, 2009	119	Montreal, Quebec	Defeats Andrews, Busty Love, and Cobra in a 4-way match.	
8	Mr. Cobra	1	September 12, 2009	119	Montreal, Quebec	Defeats Urban Miles, Busty Love, and LuFisto in a 4-way match.	
9	King TNT	1	January 23, 2010	112	Montreal, Quebec	Defeated Mr. Cobra, Electrico, and Seth Seifer in a 4-way match.	
10	Electrico	1	May 15, 2010	133	Montreal, Quebec	Defeated King TNT & Maxx Fury in a handicap match.	
11	Karl Briscoe	1	September 25, 2010	119	Montreal, Quebec		
12	Pat Guénette	1	January 22, 2011	112	Montreal, Quebec		
13	Leon Saver	1	May 14, 2011	133	Montreal, Quebec		
14	Surfer Mitch	1	September 24, 2011	70	Montreal, Quebec		
15	Jagger Miles	1	December 3, 2011	84	Montreal, Quebec	Defeated Mitch, Alextreme, Bruiser Blackwell, Pitbull Brando, and Toxic in a 6-way match.	
16	Alextreme	1	February 25, 2012	98	Montreal, Quebec		
17	Prince Kiol	1	June 2, 2012	196	Montreal, Quebec	Defeats Alextreme, Surfer Mitch, Toxic, Electrico, and David Knox in a 6-way match.	
18	Mark Andrews	3	December 15, 2012	154	Montreal, Quebec	Defeated Kiol and Pat Skills in a 3-way match.	
19	Jack Frost	1	May 18, 2013	14	Montreal, Quebec	Defeated Mark Andrews, Booglie, Karl Briscoe, and Volkano in a 5-way match.	
20	Apocalypse	1	June 1, 2013	105	Montreal, Quebec		
21	Booglie	1	September 14, 2013	182	Montreal, Quebec	Defeats Apocalypse, Jack Fost, and Max Muerte in a 4-way match.	
22	Jesse Champagne	1	March 15, 2014	175	Montreal, Quebec		
23	Eddy ErDogan	1	September 6, 2014	98	Montreal, Quebec		
—	Vacated	—	December 13, 2014	—	Montreal, Quebec	Title is vacant due to ErDogan leaving the promotion.	
24	Fury	1	December 13, 2014	84	Montreal, Quebec	Defeated Fuego Rudo, Volkano, and Leon Saver in 4-way match.	
25	Leon Saver	2	March 7, 2015	42	Montreal, Quebec		
26	Fury	2	April 18, 2015	14	Montreal, Quebec		
27	Leon Saver	3	May 2, 2015	224	Montreal, Quebec		
28	Brad Alekxis	1	December 12, 2015	70	Montreal, Quebec	Wins the first fall of a 3-way match against Saver and Electrico with a stipulation that the Triple Crown Championship is at stake in the first fall and the NCW Inter-Cities Heavyweight Championship for the second fall.	
29	Bonesetter	1	February 20, 2016	120	Sainte-Thérèse, Quebec		
30	Brad Alekxis	2	June 19, 2016	<1	Sainte-Thérèse, Quebec		
—	Vacated	—	June 19, 2016	—	Sainte-Thérèse, Quebec	Declared vacant due to Alekxis spitting on and throwing the belt right after winning it.	
31	James Stone	1	October 15, 2016	<1	Vercheres, Quebec	Defeated Jesse Champagne to win the vacant title.	
—	Retired	—	October 15, 2016	—	Sainte-Thérèse, Quebec	Title retired upon Stone winning the title.	

== Combined reigns ==
Symbol	Meaning
<1	The reign is less than one day.

Rank	Champion	No. of reigns	Combined days
1	Leon Saver	3	399
2	Mark Andrews	3	364
3	Prince Kiol	1	196
4	Booglie	1	182
5	Jesse Champagne	1	175
6	Electrico	1	133
7	Bonesetter	1	120
8	Urban Miles	1	119
8	Mr. Cobra	1	119
8	Karl Briscoe	1	119
11	Busty Love	2	118
12	King TNT	1	112
12	Pat Guénette	1	112
14	Jake Matthews	1	105
14	Apocalypse	1	105
16	Alextreme	1	98
16	Eddy ErDogan	1	98
16	Fury	2	98
19	Chakal	1	85
20	Jagger Miles	1	84
21	Surfer Mitch	1	70
21	Brad Alekxis	2	70
23	Jack Frost	1	14
24	James Stone	1	<1

== See also ==
- NCW Inter-Cities Heavyweight Championship
