= NCW Inter-Cities Heavyweight Championship =

Professional wrestling championship

Details
- Promotion: Northern Championship Wrestling
- Date established: December 18, 1986
- Current champion: Jesse Champagne
- Date won: May 6, 2017

Other names
- AWA Heavyweight Championship (1986-1992); NCW Inter-City Championship (1992-present)
Statistics
- First champion: Rick Lawrence
- Most reigns: Eric Shelley and Nightmare (4 times)
- Longest reign: Boris Kruschevv (718 days)
- Shortest reign: Dream Kill and Deniss Sensation (<1 day)

The NCW Inter-Cities Heavyweight Championship a title contested in the Canadian wrestling promotion Northern Championship Wrestling. It was first established in 1986 as the AWA (Amateur Wrestling Association) Heavyweight Championship when Rick Lawrence became the first champion. It 1992 it became the NCW Inter-Cities Championship.

== Title history ==
As of November 29, 2025.

| # | Order in reign history |
| Reign | The reign number for the specific set of wrestlers listed |
| Event | The event promoted by the respective promotion in which the titles were won |
| — | Used for vacated reigns so as not to count it as an official reign |
| <1 | Indicates that the reign was less than one day |
| + | Indicates the current reign is changing daily |

| No. | Champion | Reign | Date | Days held | Location | Notes | Ref |
|---|---|---|---|---|---|---|---|
| 1 | Rick Lawrence | 1 | December 18, 1986 | 119 | Joliette, Quebec | First Amateur Wrestling Association Heavyweight Champion. | |
| 2 | Mart Garvin | 1 | April 14, 1987 | 248 | Joliette, Quebec | | |
| 3 | Rick Lawrence | 2 | December 18, 1987 | 81 | Joliette, Quebec | Wins by default when Garvin leaves the promotion | |
| 4 | Phil Bélanger | 1 | March 8, 1988 | 52 | Joliette, Quebec | Awarded when Lawrence retires | |
| 5 | Lost Boy | 1 | April 29, 1988 | 35 | Joliette, Quebec | | |
| 6 | Boris Kruschevv | 1 | June 3, 1988 | 718 | Crabtree, Quebec | | |
| 7 | Frank Blues | 1 | May 22, 1990 | 342 | Joliette, Quebec | | |
| — | Vacated | — | April 29, 1991 | — | — | Title is vacant after match between Blues and Kruschevv. | |
| 8 | Fred Della Serra | 1 | May 27, 1991 | 293 | Joliette, Quebec | Defeated Black Bear in the finals of an 8-man tournament. | |
| 9 | Black Bear | 1 | March 15, 1992 | 202 | Joliette, Quebec | | |
| 10 | Frank Blues | 2 | October 3, 1992 | 35 | Joliette, Quebec | Blues was the reigning NCW Quebec Heavyweight Champion. Defeated Black Bear in the champion vs. champion match. | |
| — | Vacated | — | November 7, 1992 | — | — | Blues vacates the title to continue focusing on the NCW Quebec Heavyweight Championship | |
| 11 | Jack le Bûcheron | 1 | December 5, 1992 | 91 | Joliette, Quebec | Defeated Phil Bélanger to win the vacant championship. | |
| 12 | El Diablero Sr. | 1 | March 6, 1993 | 28 | Joliette, Quebec | | |
| 13 | Boris Kruschevv | 2 | April 3, 1993 | 224 | Joliette, Quebec | | |
| 14 | El Diablero Sr. | 2 | November 13, 1993 | 119 | Joliette, Quebec | | |
| 15 | Syl Dancer | 1 | March 12, 1994 | 259 | Joliette, Quebec | | |
| 16 | Phil Bélanger | 2 | November 26, 1994 | 49 | Joliette, Quebec | | |
| 17 | Black Bear | 2 | January 14, 1995 | 56 | Joliette, Quebec | | |
| 18 | Crazzy Eddy | 1 | March 11, 1995 | 14 | Joliette, Quebec | | |
| 19 | Boris Kruschevv | 3 | March 25, 1995 | 14 | Joliette, Quebec | | |
| 20 | Phil Bélanger | 3 | April 8, 1995 | 56 | Joliette, Quebec | | |
| 21 | Iceman | 1 | June 3, 1995 | 218 | Joliette, Quebec | | |
| 22 | Le Rebel | 1 | January 7, 1996 | 62 | Épiphanie, Quebec | | |
| 23 | Le Cameleon | 1 | March 9, 1996 | 56 | Épiphanie, Quebec | | |
| 24 | Syl Dancer | 2 | May 4, 1996 | 14 | Montreal, Quebec | Defeated Le Caméléon and Le Rebel in 3-way match. | |
| 25 | Le Cameleon | 2 | May 18, 1996 | 8 | Beauharnois, Quebec | Defeated Syl Dancer and Le Rebel in 3-way match. | |
| 26 | Le Rebel | 2 | May 26, 1996 | 6 | Montreal, Quebec | | |
| 27 | Le Cameleon | 3 | June 1, 1996 | 104 | Joliette, Quebec | Defeated Le Rebel and Syl Dancer in 3-way match. | |
| 28 | Alexandre le Magnifique | 1 | September 13, 1996 | 127 | Lavaltrie, Quebec | | |
| 29 | Marc le Grizzly | 1 | January 18, 1997 | 56 | Montreal, Quebec | | |
| 30 | Mike Lyons | 1 | March 15, 1997 | 84 | Montreal, Quebec | | |
| 31 | Marc le Grizzly | 2 | June 7, 1997 | 126 | Joliette, Quebec | | |
| 32 | Marz | 1 | October 11, 1997 | 43 | Montreal, Quebec | | |
| 33 | Alexandre le Magnifique | 2 | November 23, 1997 | 7 | Montreal, Quebec | | |
| 34 | Dream Killer | 1 | November 30, 1997 | 56 | Montreal, Quebec | | |
| 35 | Syl le Sadique | 3 | January 25, 1998 | 6 | Montreal, Quebec | | |
| — | Vacated | — | January 31, 1998 | — | — | Syl le Sadique vacated the title upon winning the NCW Quebec Heavyweight Championship | |
| 36 | Daniel Léon | 1 | March 21, 1998 | 56 | Montreal, Quebec | Defeats Golem the Giant in the finals of an 8-man tournament. | |
| 37 | Alexandre le Magnifique | 3 | June 13, 1998 | 28 | Montreal, Quebec | Defeated Léon and Dream Killer in 3-way match. | |
| — | Vacated | — | July 11, 1998 | — | Joliette, Quebec | Title is declared vacant when Alexandre le Magnifique is suspended. | |
| 38 | Dream Killer | 2 | July 11, 1998 | 43 | Joliette, Quebec | Defeated Chakal to win the vacant title. | |
| 39 | Golem the Giant | 1 | August 23, 1998 | 20 | Joliette, Quebec | | |
| 40 | Marc le Grizzly | 3 | September 12, 1998 | 14 | Mont-Laurier, Quebec | | |
| 41 | Golem the Giant | 2 | September 26, 1998 | 196 | Montreal, Quebec | Teams with Guy Williams and Cobra to defeat Marc le Grizzly, Iceman, and Black Eagle in a 6-man tag team match. | |
| 42 | Yvan L'Imitateur | 1 | April 10, 1999 | 14 | Montreal, Quebec | | |
| 43 | Golem the Giant | 3 | April 24, 1999 | 105 | Montreal, Quebec | | |
| 44 | Steven the Sweet Boy | 1 | August 7, 1999 | 70 | Montreal, Quebec | | |
| 45 | Eric Shelley | 1 | October 16, 1999 | 28 | Montreal, Quebec | | |
| 46 | Chakal | 1 | November 13, 1999 | 35 | Beauharnois, Quebec | | |
| 47 | Franky the Mobster | 1 | December 18, 1999 | 56 | Montreal, Quebec | | |
| 48 | Eric Shelley | 1 | February 12, 2000 | 28 | Montreal, Quebec | | |
| 49 | Franky the Mobster | 2 | March 11, 2000 | 21 | Montreal, Quebec | | |
| 50 | Steven the Sweet Boy | 2 | April 1, 2000 | 14 | Montreal, Quebec | | |
| 51 | Eric Shelley | 3 | April 15, 2000 | 35 | Montreal, Quebec | | |
| 52 | Franky the Mobster | 3 | May 20, 2000 | 112 | Montreal, Quebec | Defeated Shelley and Steven the Sweet Boy in 3-way match. | |
| 53 | Dream Killer | 3 | September 9, 2000 | <1 | Montreal, Quebec | Awarded the title when Franky the Mobster is unable to defend the title. | |
| 54 | Nightmare | 1 | September 9, 2000 | 28 | Quebec City, Quebec | Wins the Dream Killer Invitational War Match against Nova Cain, Bishop, Nighstalker, and J.F. McAllister. | |
| 55 | Deniss Sensation | 1 | October 7, 2000 | <1 | Montreal, Quebec | | |
| 56 | Nightmare | 2 | October 7, 2000 | 7 | Montreal, Quebec | | |
| 57 | Jayzon Reaper | 1 | October 14, 2000 | 28 | Quebec City, Quebec | | |
| 58 | Nightmare | 3 | November 11, 2000 | 64 | Quebec City, Quebec | | |
| 59 | Eric Shelley | 4 | January 14, 2001 | 54 | Laval, Quebec | | |
| 60 | Cobra | 1 | March 9, 2001 | 43 | Montreal, Quebec | Award when Eric Shelley leaves the promotion. | |
| 61 | Nightmare | 4 | April 21, 2001 | 42 | Montreal, Quebec | | |
| 62 | Chakal | 2 | June 2, 2001 | 119 | Montreal, Quebec | | |
| 63 | Steven the Sweet Boy | 3 | September 29, 2001 | 42 | Quebec City, Quebec | | |
| 64 | Blaze | 1 | November 10, 2001 | 133 | Montreal, Quebec | Defeats Big Guns Guido who was subbing for Steven the Sweet Boy. | |
| — | Vacated | — | March 23, 2002 | — | Montreal, Quebec | Blaze vacates the title when he is ordered by a doctor to stop wrestling for a year. | |
| 65 | Black Eagle | 1 | March 23, 2002 | 147 | Montreal, Quebec | Defeats Steven the Sweet Boy in the finals of a 4-man tournament. | |
| 66 | Nightstalker | 1 | August 17, 2002 | 56 | Montreal, Quebec | | |
| 67 | Black Eagle | 2 | October 12, 2002 | 42 | Montreal, Quebec | | |
| 68 | Diablero | 1 | November 23, 2002 | 77 | Montreal, Quebec | | |
| 69 | TNT | 1 | February 8, 2003 | 189 | Montreal, Quebec | | |
| 70 | Deniss Sensation | 1 | August 16, 2003 | 56 | Montreal, Quebec | Defeated TNT and Steven the Sweet Boy in 3-way match. | |
| 71 | Diablero | 2 | October 11, 2003 | 70 | Montreal, Quebec | | |
| 72 | Deniss Sensation | 3 | December 20, 2003 | <1 | Montreal, Quebec | Defeats TNT, Diablero, and Kazuko Yeroshima in 4-way match. | |
| — | Vacated | — | December 20, 2003 | — | Montreal, Quebec | Deniss Sensation vacates the title after the match upon announcing his retirement. | |
| 73 | Bishop | 1 | February 7, 2004 | 28 | Montreal, Quebec | Defeated Chakal in the finals of 8-man tournament. | |
| 74 | Blaze | 2 | March 6, 2004 | 56 | Montreal, Quebec | | |
| 75 | Binovich Fouranov | 1 | May 1, 2004 | 158 | Montreal, Quebec | | |
| — | Vacated | — | October 6, 2004 | — | — | Title is vacated when Fournov undergoes shoulder surgery. | |
| 76 | Gorgeous Mike | 1 | October 30, 2004 | 49 | Montreal, Quebec | Defeated Nova Cain, Bishop, and Sunny War Cloud in 4-way match. | |
| 77 | Binovich Fouranov | 2 | December 18, 2004 | 28 | Montreal, Quebec | | |
| 78 | Nova Cain | 1 | January 15, 2005 | 63 | Montreal, Quebec | | |
| 79 | Binovich Fouranov | 3 | March 19, 2005 | 56 | Montreal, Quebec | | |
| 80 | Gorgeous Mike | 2 | May 14, 2005 | 175 | Montreal, Quebec | Defeated Fouranov and Nova Cain in 3-way match. | |
| 81 | Raid | 1 | November 5, 2005 | 196 | Montreal, Quebec | | |
| 82 | Diablero | 3 | May 20, 2006 | 28 | Beauceville, Quebec | | |
| 83 | Raid | 2 | June 17, 2006 | 133 | Montreal, Quebec | | |
| 84 | James Kraven | 1 | October 28, 2006 | 49 | Montreal, Quebec | | |
| 85 | Don Paysan | 1 | December 16, 2006 | 91 | Montreal, Quebec | Defeated Kraven, TNT, Diablero, and Deniss Sensation in 5-way ladder match. | |
| 86 | Samson | 1 | March 17, 2006 | 182 | Montreal, Quebec | | |
| 87 | Jimmy Stone | 1 | September 15, 2006 | 42 | Montreal, Quebec | | |
| 88 | Samson | 2 | October 27, 2006 | 49 | Montreal, Quebec | Defeated Stone, Gorgeous Mike, and Jake Matthews in 4-way match. | |
| 89 | Jimmy Stone | 2 | December 15, 2006 | 91 | Montreal, Quebec | | |
| 90 | Nova Cain | 2 | March 15, 2008 | 182 | Montreal, Quebec | Jay Phenomenon subs for the injured Carin and defends the title against James Stone on August 16. | |
| 91 | Tank | 1 | September 13, 2008 | 133 | Montreal, Quebec | | |
| 92 | Jay Phenomenon | 1 | January 24, 2009 | 98 | Montreal, Quebec | | |
| 93 | James Stone | 3 | May 2, 2009 | 14 | Montreal, Quebec | | |
| 92 | Jay Phenomenon | 2 | May 16, 2009 | 364 | Montreal, Quebec | | |
| 93 | Urban Miles | 1 | May 15, 2010 | 175 | Montreal, Quebec | Defeated Phenomenon, Sidi Mansour, Mark Andrews, Karl Briscoe, and Pee Wee in a 6-way match. | |
| 94 | Handsome J.F. | 1 | November 6, 2010 | 18 | Montreal, Quebec | Defeated Urban Miles and Marvelous Jeff in 3-way match. | |
| 95 | Marvelous Jeff | 1 | December 18, 2010 | 77 | Montreal, Quebec | | |
| 96 | Handsome J.F. | 2 | March 5, 2011 | 70 | Montreal, Quebec | | |
| 97 | Mark Andrews | 1 | May 14, 2011 | 161 | Montreal, Quebec | Defeats Handsome J.F., Urban Miles, Gorgeous Mike, and Marvelous Jeff in 5-way ladder match. | |
| 98 | Buxx Belmar | 1 | October 22, 2011 | 42 | Montreal, Quebec | | |
| 99 | Mobster 357 | 1 | December 3, 2011 | 126 | Montreal, Quebec | | |
| 100 | Gorgeous Mike | 3 | April 7, 2012 | 56 | Montreal, Quebec | | |
| 101 | Pat Guénette | 1 | June 2, 2012 | 133 | Montreal, Quebec | | |
| 102 | Urban Miles | 2 | October 13, 2012 | 119 | Montreal, Quebec | | |
| 103 | Leon Saver | 1 | February 9, 2013 | 217 | Montreal, Quebec | | |
| 104 | William Brady | 1 | September 14, 2013 | 91 | Montreal, Quebec | | |
| 105 | Handsome J.F. | 3 | December 14, 2013 | 63 | Montreal, Quebec | | |
| 106 | William Brady | 1 | February 15, 2014 | 203 | Montreal, Quebec | Defeated Handsome J.F. and Apocalypse in a handicap match. | |
| 107 | Dru Onyx | 1 | September 6, 2014 | 14 | Montreal, Quebec | | |
| 108 | Electrico | 1 | September 20, 2014 | 182 | Montreal, Quebec | | |
| 109 | Cyrus Payne | 1 | March 21, 2015 | 56 | Montreal, Quebec | | |
| 110 | Electrico | 2 | May 16, 2015 | 77 | Montreal, Quebec | | |
| 111 | Leon Saver | 2 | August 1, 2015 | 133 | Montreal, Quebec | Defeated Electrico, Brad Alekxis, Buxx Belmar, H.C. Ryder, and Oliver Strange in 6-way match. | |
| 112 | Electrico | 3 | December 12, 2015 | 56 | Montreal, Quebec | Electrico wins the second fall of a 3-way match against Saver and Brad Alekxis with a stipulation that the NCW Triple Crown Championship is at stake in the first fall and the Inter-Cities Championship for the second fall. | |
| 113 | Urban Miles | 3 | February 6, 2016 | 315 | Sainte-Thérèse, Quebec | | |
| 114 | Antonio Corsi | 1 | December 17, 2016 | 140 | Sainte-Thérèse, Quebec | | |
| 115 | Jesse Champagne | 1 | May 6, 2017 | 3129+ | Sainte-Thérèse, Quebec | | |

== Combined reigns ==
As of November 29, 2025.

| † | Indicates the current champion |

| Rank | Champion | No. of reigns | Combined days |
|---|---|---|---|
| 1 | Boris Kruschevv | 3 | 956 |
| 2 | Urban Miles | 3 | 609 |
| 3 | Jay Phenomenon | 2 | 462 |
| 4 | Frank Blues | 2 | 377 |
| 5 | Leon Saver | 2 | 350 |
| 6 | Raid | 2 | 329 |
| 7 | William Brady | 2 | 294 |
| 8 | Fred Della Serra | 1 | 293 |
| 9 | Gorgeous Mike | 3 | 280 |
| 10 | Syl Dancer/Syl le Sadique | 3 | 279 |
| 11 | Black Bear | 2 | 258 |
| 12 | Mart Garvin | 1 | 248 |
| 13 | Nova Cain | 2 | 245 |
| 14 | Binovich Fouranov | 3 | 242 |
| 15 | Electrico | 2 | 238 |
| 16 | Samson | 2 | 231 |
| 17 | Iceman | 1 | 218 |
| 18 | Rick Lawrence | 2 | 201 |
| 19 | Marc le Grizzly | 3 | 196 |
| 20 | Franky the Mobster | 3 | 189 |
| 20 | Blaze | 2 | 189 |
| 20 | Black Eagle | 2 | 189 |
| 20 | TNT | 1 | 189 |
| 24 | Le Cameleon | 3 | 168 |
| 25 | Mark Andrews | 1 | 161 |
| 26 | Alexandre le Magnifique | 3 | 162 |
| 27 | Phil Bélanger | 3 | 157 |
| 28 | Chakal | 2 | 154 |
| 29 | Handsome J.F. | 3 | 151 |
| 30 | El Diablero Sr. | 2 | 147 |
| 30 | Diablero | 2 | 147 |
| 30 | Jimmy Stone/James Stone | 3 | 147 |
| 33 | Eric Shelley | 4 | 145 |
| 34 | Jesse Champagne† | 1 | 3129+ |
| 35 | Nightmare | 4 | 141 |
| 36 | Antonio Corsi | 1 | 140 |
| 37 | Tank | 1 | 133 |
| 37 | Pat Guénette | 1 | 133 |
| 39 | Steven the Sweet Boy | 3 | 126 |
| 39 | Mobster 357 | 1 | 126 |
| 41 | Golem the Giant | 3 | 105 |
| 42 | Dream Killer | 3 | 99 |
| 43 | Jack le Bûcheron | 1 | 91 |
| 43 | Don Paysan | 1 | 91 |
| 45 | Mike Lyons | 1 | 84 |
| 46 | Marvelous Jeff | 1 | 70 |
| 47 | Le Rebel | 2 | 68 |
| 48 | Nightstalker | 1 | 56 |
| 48 | Deniss Sensation | 2 | 56 |
| 48 | Cyrus Payne | 1 | 56 |
| 51 | James Kraven | 1 | 49 |
| 52 | Marz | 1 | 43 |
| 52 | Cobra | 1 | 43 |
| 54 | Buxx Belmar | 1 | 42 |
| 55 | Lost Boy | 1 | 35 |
| 56 | Jayzon Reaper | 1 | 28 |
| 56 | Bishop | 1 | 28 |
| 58 | Crazzy Eddy | 1 | 14 |
| 58 | Yvan L'Imitateur | 1 | 14 |
| 58 | Dru Onyx | 1 | 14 |

== See also ==
- NCW Quebec Heavyweight Championship
- NCW Triple Crown Championship
