= NCW Quebec Heavyweight Championship =

Professional wrestling championship

Details
- Promotion: Northern Championship Wrestling
- Date established: May 5, 1992
- Current champion(s): Alextreme
- Date won: May 6, 2017

Other name(s)
- Lutte Lanaudière Québéc Championship (1992-1995); NCW Québéc Championship (1995-present)
Statistics
- First champion(s): Frank Blues
- Most reigns: Piranah/Chase Ironside (6 times)
- Longest reign: Frank Blues (578 days)
- Shortest reign: Frank Blues (7 days)

The NCW Quebec Heavyweight Championship is a title contested in the Canadian wrestling promotion Northern Championship Wrestling. It was originally established in 1992 as the Lutte Lanaudière Québéc Championship. Frank Blues defeated Phil Bélanger on May 5, 1992 to become the first Lutte Lanaudière Québéc Champion.

== Title history ==
As of March 27, 2025.

#	Order in reign history
Reign	The reign number for the specific set of wrestlers listed
Event	The event promoted by the respective promotion in which the titles were won
—	Used for vacated reigns so as not to count it as an official reign
+	Indicates the current reign is changing daily

No.	Champion	Reign	Date	Days held	Location	Notes	Ref
1	Frank Blues	1	May 5, 1992	578	Joliette, Quebec	Blues defeated Phil Bélanger to become the first Lutte Lanaudière Québéc Champion.	
2	Dream Killer	1	December 4, 1993	546	Joliette, Quebec		
2	Frank Blues	2	June 3, 1995	168	Joliette, Quebec	Title is renamed NCW Québéc Championship.	
3	Phil Bélanger	1	November 18, 1995	92	Épiphanie, Quebec		
4	Black Bear	1	February 18, 1996		Montreal, Quebec		
—	Vacated	—	April 1996	—	—	Title is vacant due to Black Bear leaving the promotion.	(Note: The exact length of Black Bear's reign is unknown. It could have lasted between 43 and 70 days.)
5	Golem the Giant	1	April 28, 1996	229	Montreal, Quebec	Golem the Giant defeated Caméléon to in tournament finals.	
6	Iceman	1	December 13, 1996	162	Lavaltrie, Quebec		
7	Frank Blues	3	May 24, 1997	7	Rigaug, Quebec		
8	Iceman	2	May 31, 1997	245	Beauharnois, Quebec		
9	Syl le Sadique	1	January 31, 1998	133	Montreal, Quebec		
10	Iceman	3	June 13, 1998	119	Joliette, Quebec		
11	Marc le Grizzly	1	October 10, 1998	72	Montreal, Quebec		
12	Dream Killer	2	December 21, 1998	40	Montreal, Quebec		
13	Marc le Grizzly	2	January 30, 1999	84	Montreal, Quebec		
14	Dream Killer	3	April 24, 1999	42	Montreal, Quebec		
15	Marc le Grizzly	3	June 5, 1999	126	Joliette, Quebec		
16	Piranah	1	October 9, 1999	70	Montreal, Quebec		
17	Golem the Giant	2	December 18, 1999	105	Montreal, Quebec		
18	Piranah	2	April 1, 2000	14	Montreal, Quebec		
19	Golem the Giant	3	April 15, 2000	35	Montreal, Quebec		
20	Piranah	3	May 20, 2000	168	Montreal, Quebec		
21	Chakal	1	November 4, 2000	28	Montreal, Quebec		
22	Piranah	4	December 2, 2000	42	Montreal, Quebec		
23	Franky the Mobster	1	January 13, 2001	56	Montreal, Quebec		
24	Guy Williams	1	March 10, 2001	84	Montreal, Quebec		
25	Piranah	5	June 2, 2001	126	Montreal, Quebec		
26	Cobra	1	October 6, 2001	14	Montreal, Quebec		
—	Vacated	—	October 20, 2001	—	Montreal, Quebec	Title was declared vacant after a match with Piranah due to Cobra suffering a concussion and puts him out of action indefinitely.	
27	Iceman	4	November 24, 2001	77	Montreal, Quebec	Defeated Nightmare in the finals of a 16-man tournament.	
28	Chakal	2	February 9, 2002	42	Montreal, Quebec		
29	Franky the Mobster	2	March 23, 2002	56	Montreal, Quebec		
30	Chakal	3	May 18, 2002	147	Montreal, Quebec		
31	Nightmare	1	October 12, 2002	42	Montreal, Quebec	Defeated Chakal and Chase Ironside in a 3-way.	
32	Deniss Sensation	1	November 23, 2002	14	Montreal, Quebec		
33	Nightmare	2	December 7, 2002	49	Montreal, Quebec		
34	Black Eagle	1	January 25, 2003	56	Montreal, Quebec		
35	Manuel Vegas	1	March 22, 2003	189	Montreal, Quebec	Defeated Black Eagle than Chakal, who has defeated Chase Ironside, in a Double Jeopardy Match.	
36	Chase Ironside	6	September 27, 2003	84	Montreal, Quebec		
37	Manuel Vegas	2	December 20, 2003	63	Montreal, Quebec		
38	Franky the Mobster	3	February 21, 2004	43	Montreal, Quebec		
39	Chakal	4	April 3, 2004	406	Montreal, Quebec		
40	Manuel Vegas	3	May 14, 2005	119	Montreal, Quebec		
41	Jake Matthews	1	September 10, 2005	56	Montreal, Quebec		
42	James Champagne	1	November 5, 2005	42	Montreal, Quebec	Defeated Matthews, Bishop, and Chakal in 4-way match.	
43	Bishop	1	December 17, 2005	91	Montreal, Quebec		
44	Jake Matthews	2	March 18, 2006	56	Montreal, Quebec	Defeated Matthews, Bishop, and Chakal in 4-way match.	
45	Bishop	2	May 13, 2006	581	Montreal, Quebec	Bishop beat Matthews in a Ladder match.	
46	Don Paysan	1	December 15, 2007	315	Montreal, Quebec		
47	Samson	1	October 25, 2008	56	Montreal, Quebec		
48	Sylvain Grenier	1	December 20, 2008	49	Montreal, Quebec		
49	Nova Cain	1	February 7, 2009	98	Montreal, Quebec		
50	Don Paysan	2	May 16, 2009	210	Montreal, Quebec	Defeated Nova Cain and Sylvain Grenier in 3-way match. Grenier suffers an injury in the match	
51	Samson	2	December 12, 2009	77	Montreal, Quebec		
—	Vacated	—	February 27, 2010	—	Montreal, Quebec	Samson vacated title due to health issues.	
52	Tank	1	May 15, 2010	133	Montreal, Quebec	Defeated Mr. Cobra and Gorgeous Mike in 3-way match after Tank and Cobra become the two finalists of 16-man tournament.	
53	Gorgeous Mike	1	September 25, 2010	119	Montreal, Quebec		
54	James Stone	1	January 22, 2011	112	Montreal, Quebec	Defeated Gorgeous Mike, Don Paysan, and Jay Phenomenon in 4-way match.	
55	Jay Phenomenon	1	May 14, 2011	161	Montreal, Quebec		
56	Handsome J.F.	1	October 22, 2011	49	Montreal, Quebec		
57	Frank Blues	4	December 10, 2011	35	Montreal, Quebec		
58	Handsome J.F.	2	January 14, 2012	140	Montreal, Quebec	Defeated Blues and Pat Guénette in 3-way elimination match.	
59	Dru Onyx	1	June 2, 2012	336	Montreal, Quebec		
60	Pat Guénette	1	May 4, 2013	224	Montreal, Quebec		
61	Urban Miles	1	December 14, 2013	154	Montreal, Quebec		
62	Pat Guénette	2	May 17, 2014	210	Montreal, Quebec		
63	Dru Onyx	1	December 13, 2014	140	Montreal, Quebec	Defeated Pat Guénette, William Brady, and Alextreme in 4-way match.	
64	Chakal	5	May 2, 2015	350	Montreal, Quebec	Teams with Bishop to defeat Dru Onyx and Stew Korvus in a tag team match.	
65	Leon Saver	1	April 16, 2016	64	Montreal, Quebec		
66	Scott Jagged Parker	1	June 19, 2016	125	Sainte-Thérèse, Quebec		
67	Leon Saver	2	October 22, 2016	56	Sainte-Thérèse, Quebec		
68	William Brady	1	December 17, 2016	140	Sainte-Thérèse, Quebec		
69	Alextreme	1	May 6, 2017	2882+	Sainte-Thérèse, Quebec		

== Combined reigns ==
As of March 27, 2025.

†	Indicates the current champion
¤	The exact length of at least one title reign is uncertain, so the shortest possible length is used.

Rank	Champion	No. of reigns	Combined days
1	Alextreme†	1	2882+
2	Chakal	5	973
3	Frank Blues	4	788
4	Bishop	2	672
5	Dream Killer	3	628
6	Iceman	4	603
7	Don Paysan	2	525
8	Piranah/Chase Ironside	6	504
9	Dru Onyx	2	476
10	Pat Guénette	2	434
11	Golem the Giant	3	373
12	Manuel Vegas	3	371
13	Marc le Grizzly	3	282
14	Handsome J.F.	2	189
15	Jay Phenomenon	1	161
16	Franky the Mobster	3	155
17	Urban Miles	1	154
18	William Brady	1	140
19	Syl le Sadique	1	133
19	Samson	2	133
19	Tank	1	133
22	Scott Jagged Parker	1	125
23	Leon Saver	2	120
24	Gorgeous Mike	1	119
25	Jake Matthews	2	112
25	James Stone	1	112
27	Nova Cain	1	98
28	Phil Bélanger	1	92
29	Nightmare	2	91
30	Guy Williams	1	84
31	Black Eagle	1	56¤
32	Sylvain Grenier	1	49
33	Black Bear	1	43¤
34	James Champagne	1	42
35	Cobra	1	14
35	Deniss Sensation	1	14

== See also ==
- NCW Inter-Cities Heavyweight Championship
