= Northern Championship Wrestling =

- Acronym: NCW
- Founded: 1986
- Style: Professional wrestling
- Headquarters: Montreal, Quebec, Canada
- Founder(s): Phil Bélanger (co-founder); François Poirier (co-founder)
- Sister: NCW Femmes Fatales
- Formerly: Amateur Wrestling Association (1986–1992); Lutte Lanaudière (1992–95)
- Website: nCw.qc.ca

Northern Championship Wrestling (Les Promotions NCW Inc.) is an independent professional wrestling promotion based in Montreal, Quebec, Canada.

== History ==
Founded in 1986 by François Poirier and Phil Bélanger in Joliette, Quebec as the Amateur Wrestling Association, while in high school. In 1992, they changed their name to Lutte Lanaudière, as they moved from Joliette to Lanaudière. In 1995, they changed their name to its current name Northern Championship Wrestling, and moved to Montreal in 1996, running wrestling shows at the Centre Notre-Dame de Rosaire (Centre N.D.R.) from 1996 to 2009 and at Saint-Barthelemy Center in from 2009 to 2013. Currently shows are held at Centre LGH (10015 ave Bruxelles, Montréal Nord).

On August 13, 2005, shortly after his departure from World Wrestling Entertainment (WWE), the promotion hosted Lance Storm for a show called SummerStorm in order to promote his new Storm Wrestling Academy. Storm got involved in the main event, doing a run-in to help Manuel Vegas retain the NCW Quebec title against Chakal.

Sylvain Grenier wrestled for the promotion from November 2002 until starting full-time with WWE at No Way Out 2003. He first wrestled former NCW Quebec Champion Manuel Vegas, then defeated NCW wrestlers Chakal, Chase Ironside and Nova Cain.

Sylvain returned to NCW at ChallengeMania 15 on May 19, 2007. Still under contract with WWE, he tagged with Don Paysan and Bishop to defeat Chakal, Nightmare and Phil Bélanger in the Main Event. After his release from WWE, Sylvan returned to NCW, wrestling Franky The Mobster at Montreal Chairshot Massacre in October 2007.

On August 23, 2008, NCW hosted a wrestling SuperShow involving The Honky Tonk Man, Johnny Devine and Bushwhacker Luke.

Since 1995, NCW wrestlers such as Chakal, Franky The Mobster, Nova Cain and Don Paysan have been ranked in the Pro Wrestling Illustrated's PWI 500.

In April 2009, nCw drew 600 for Abdullah The Butcher's Last Match in Canada.

In September 2009, nCw hosted their first edition of NCW Femmes Fatales which regrouped many fighting female in North America. NCW Femmes Fatales was announced in April 2010 to be part of the Female Fight League during the 45th Edition of the Cauliflower Alley Club Reunion in Las Vegas.

In November 2009, they gave an hommage to Maurice Vachon and Paul Vachon as part of a documentary tracing back Mad Dog's career.

== Championships ==
=== Current championships ===
Championship	Champion(s)	Previous Champion(s)	Date	Days Held	Location
NCW Quebec Heavyweight Championship	Franky The Mobster	Jesse Champagne	October 29, 2021	1824+	Mirabel, Quebec
NCW Inter-Cities Heavyweight Championship	Brad Alekxis	Jesse Champagne	May 6, 2017	3461+	Sainte-Thérèse, Quebec
NCW Tag Team Championship	Vacant	Grindhouse (Marc Mercer & Stew Korvus)	June 17, 2017		Sainte-Thérèse, Quebec

=== Retired championships ===
Championship	Final Champion	Date
NCW Triple Crown Championship	James Stone	October 15, 2016
NCW Cruiserweight Championship	Chakal	December 15, 2007
NCW X-Treme Championship	Chakal	December 15, 2007
NCW Television Championship	Steven the Sweet Boy	September 13, 2003
NCW Women's Championship	Vanessa Kraven	2005
NCW Hardcore Championship	Manuel Vegas	August 16, 2003

== NCW Hall of Fame ==
#	Year	Ring name (Real name)^{[a]}	Inducted by	Inducted for	Notes^{[b]}
1	1996	Ricky Riddick		Wrestling	NCW Tag Team Championship (1 time)
2	1997	Luc Pelletier			Helped get the then Amateur Wrestling Association started in the High School.
3	1997	Fred Della Serra		Wrestling	NCW Inter-Cites Championship (1 time)
4	1998	Frank Blues		Wrestling	NCW Quebec Heavyweight Championship (4 times), NCW Inter-Cites Championship (2 times), and NCW Tag Team Championship (4 times)
5	1999	Fantastik Franky		Wrestling	NCW Tag Team Championship (2 times)
6	1999	Guy Paquin			
7	2000	Phil Bélanger		Wrestling/Founder	NCW Quebec Heavyweight Championship (1 time), NCW Inter-Cites Championship (3 times), and NCW Tag Team Championship (3 times)
8	2001	Le Géant Golem		Wrestling	NCW Quebec Heavyweight Championship (3 times), NCW Inter-Cites Championship (3 times)
9	2002	Iceman		Wrestling	NCW Quebec Heavyweight Championship (4 times), NCW Inter-Cites Championship (1 time), and NCW Tag Team Championship (7 times)
10	2002	Dream Killer		Wrestling	NCW Quebec Heavyweight Championship (3 times), NCW Inter-Cites Championship (3 times), NCW Tag Team Championship (3 times), and NCW Hardcore Championship (1 time)
11	2003	Black Bear		Wrestling	NCW Quebec Heavyweight Championship (1 time), NCW Inter-Cites Championship (2 times), and NCW Tag Team Championship (1 time)
12	2004	Marc the Grizzly (Marc Pilon)		Wrestling	NCW Quebec Heavyweight Championship (3 times), NCW Inter-Cites Championship (3 times), and NCW Tag Team Championship (6 times)
13	2005	Floyd Broffman		Managing	
14	2006	Guy Williams		Wrestling	NCW Quebec Heavyweight Championship (1 time), NCW Inter-Cites Championship (2 times), NCW Tag Team Championship (9 times), NCW Cruiserweight Championship (1 time), and NCW Hardcore Championship (1 time)
15	2006	Boris Kruschevv		Wrestling	NCW Inter-Cites Championship (3 times), NCW Tag Team Championship (3 times)
16	2007	Nightmare		Wrestling	NCW Quebec Heavyweight Championship (2 times), NCW Inter-Cites Championship (4 times), NCW Tag Team Championship (11 times), and NCW Hardcore Championship (1 time)
17	2008	Syl le Sadique		Wrestling	NCW Quebec Heavyweight Championship (1 time), NCW Inter-Cites Championship (2 times), NCW Tag Team Championship (9 times)
18	2010	Ben le King		Wrestling	
19	2010	Bertrand Hébert		Promoting	
20	2013	Chase Ironside		Wrestling	NCW Quebec Heavyweight Championship (6 times), NCW Tag Team Championship (5 times), NCW Cruiserweight Championship (1 time)
21	2013	Rick Lawrence		Wrestling	NCW Inter-Cites Championship (2 times), NCW Tag Team Championship (1 time)
22	2013	Don Paysan		Wrestling	NCW Quebec Heavyweight Championship (2 times), NCW Inter-Cites Championship (1 time) and NCW Tag Team Championship (2 times), and NCW Cruiserweight Championship (4 times)
23	2014	Black Eagle (Sébastien Ricard)		Wrestling	NCW Quebec Heavyweight Championship (1 time), NCW Inter-Cites Championship (2 times), NCW Tag Team Championship (5 times), NCW Cruiserweight Championship (3 times), NCW X-Treme Championship (2 times), and NCW Hardcore Championship
24	2014	Nova Cain (Yan O'Cain)		Wrestling	NCW Quebec Heavyweight Championship (1 time), NCW Inter-Cites Championship (2 times) and NCW Tag Team Championship (3 times), NCW Cruiserweight Championship (1 time), and NCW Feminin Championship (1 time)
25	2014	Julie le Red Fuxx (Julie Ricard)		Wrestling	NCW Feminin Championship (2 times), NCW Tag Team Championship (2 times), and NCW Cruiserweight Championship (1 time)
26	2015	Cobra		Wrestling	NCW Quebec Heavyweight Championship (1 time), NCW Inter-Cites Championship (1 time), NCW Triple Couronne Championship (1 time), NCW Tag Team Championship (9 times), and NCW Cruiserweight Championship (1 time)
27	2015	Deniss Sensation		Wrestling	NCW Quebec Heavyweight Championship (1 time), NCW Inter-Cites Championship (3 times), NCW Tag Team Championship (1 time), and NCW Cruiserweight Championship (3 times)
28	2015	Naja Viper		Valet	
29	2016	Anna Minoushka (Kim Varin)		Wrestling	NCW Cruiserweight Championship (1 time), NCW Tag Team Championship (1 time)
30	2016	Chakal (David St-Martin)		Wrestling	NCW Quebec Heavyweight Championship (5 times), NCW Inter-Cites Championship (2 times), NCW Triple Couronne Championship (1 time), NCW Tag Team Championship (13 times), NCW X-Treme Championship (1 time), and NCW Cruiserweight Championship (2 times)
31	2019	Bishop (Loius Chayer)		Wrestling	NCW Quebec Heavyweight Championship (2 times), NCW Inter-Cites Championship (1 time), NCW Tag Team Championship (8 times), and NCW Cruiserweight Championship (1 time)
32	2019	Tank (Christos Gabriel)		Wrestling	NCW Quebec Heavyweight Championship (1 time), NCW Inter-Cites Championship (1 time), and NCW Tag Team Championship (3 times)

- ^{a} – Entries without a birth name indicates that the inductee did not perform under a ring name.
- ^{b} – This section mainly lists the major accomplishments of each inductee in the promotion.

== See also ==
- Professional wrestling in Canada
- List of professional wrestling halls of fame
