= King of Trios =

Chikara professional wrestling event series

King of Trios was a three-night tournament promoted by the Chikara professional wrestling promotion. The tournament was a different take on the Tag World Grand Prix event that the promotion was known for annually promoting; in King of Trios, instead of tag teams, there were trios that competed in six-man tag team matches to see who would advance. The tournament served as the promotion's premier event, similar to what WrestleMania is for the WWE.

== List of winners ==
Year	Winner
2007	Jigsaw, Mike Quackenbush and Shane Storm
2008	Los Luchadores de Mexico (Incognito, Lince Dorado and El Pantera)
2009	F.I.S.T. (Chuck Taylor, Gran Akuma and Icarus)
2010	Bruderschaft des Kreuzes (Ares, Claudio Castagnoli and Tursas)
2011	The Colony (Fire Ant, Green Ant [I] and Soldier Ant)
2012	The Spectral Envoy (Frightmare, Hallowicked and UltraMantis Black)
2014	The Devastation Corporation (Blaster McMassive, Flex Rumblecrunch and Max Smashmaster)
2015	Team AAA (Aero Star, Drago and Fénix)
2016	Team Sendai Girls (Cassandra Miyagi, Dash Chisako and Meiko Satomura)
2017	House Strong Style (Pete Dunne, Trent Seven and Tyler Bate)
2018	The ResistANTce (Fire Ant, Green Ant [II] and Thief Ant)
2019	The Crucible (Lance Steel, Ophidian & Princess Kimber Lee)

== 2007 ==
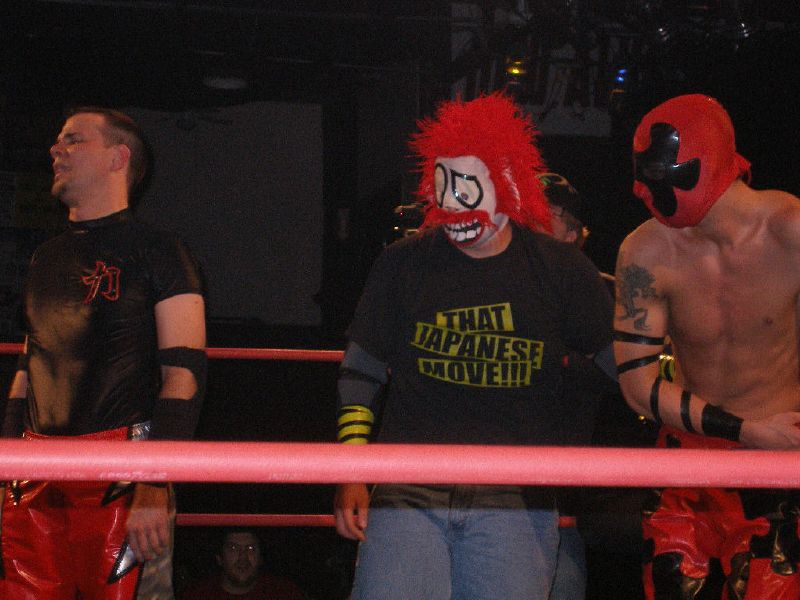
(From left to right) Mike Quackenbush, Shane Storm and Jigsaw, the 2007 King of Trios

All in all, sixteen trios competed in the tournament, making for a total of forty-eight competitors. The tournament marked the 2007 season premiere of the promotion. The three nights of the 2007 tournament took place on February 16, 2007, in Hellertown, Pennsylvania, February 17 in Barnesville, Pennsylvania, and February 18 in Philadelphia, Pennsylvania. Nobutaka Moribe was originally scheduled to be a part of Team DDT, but had to be replaced by Masamune, after getting stuck in traffic.

Teams

- BLKOUT (Joker, Ruckus and Sabian)
- The Colony (Fire Ant, Soldier Ant and Worker Ant [I])
- Hallowicked and Up in Smoke (Cheech and Cloudy)
- The Iron Saints (Brandon Thomaselli, Sal Thomaselli and Vito Thomaselli)
- The Kings of Wrestling (Chuck Taylor, Gran Akuma and Icarus)
- Larry Sweeney, Mitch Ryder and Robbie Ellis
- Los Ice Creams (El Hijo del Ice Cream, Ice Cream, Jr. and Very Mysterious Ice Cream)
- Mike Quackenbush and ShaneSaw (Jigsaw and Shane Storm)
- The Order of the Neo–Solar Temple (Crossbones, Hydra and UltraMantis Black)
- Team DDT (American Balloon, Danshoku Dino and Masamune)
- Team IWS (Jagged, Max Boyer and Shane Matthews)
- Team Kaientai Dojo (Kudo, Miyawaki and Yoshiaki Yago)
- Team Mucha Lucha (Lince Dorado, El Pantera and Sicodelico, Jr.)
- Team PWG (Chris Bosh, Joey Ryan and Scott Lost)
- Team TNA (Alex Shelley, Chris Sabin and Sonjay Dutt)
- Team USA (Jay Jaillet, The Patriot and USApe)

Tournament bracket

First round February 16 and 17
Los Ice Creams	Pin
Neo–Solar Temple	18:35
Kings of Wrestling	Pin
Team USA	09:18
Sweeney/Ryder/Ellis	Pin
Iron Saints	12:19
Kaientai Dojo	Pin
Team DDT	17:04
Team PWG	Pin
Mucha Lucha	14:06
The Colony	Pin
Hallowicked/Cheech/Cloudy	10:15
Team IWS	Pin
Quack/ShaneSaw	13:54
BLKOUT	Pin
Team TNA	17:43

Quarter-finals; February 16 and 17
Los Ice Creams	Pin
Kings of Wrestling	10:16
Iron Saints	Pin
Kaientai Dojo	17:43
Mucha Lucha	Pin
Hallowicked/Cheech/Cloudy	11:04
Quack/ShaneSaw	Pin
Team TNA	24:52

Semifinals; February 18
Kings of Wrestling	Pin
Kaientai Dojo	14:35
Mucha Lucha	Pin
Quack/ShaneSaw	14:45

Final; February 18
Kaientai Dojo	Pin
Quack/ShaneSaw	23:05

== 2008 ==
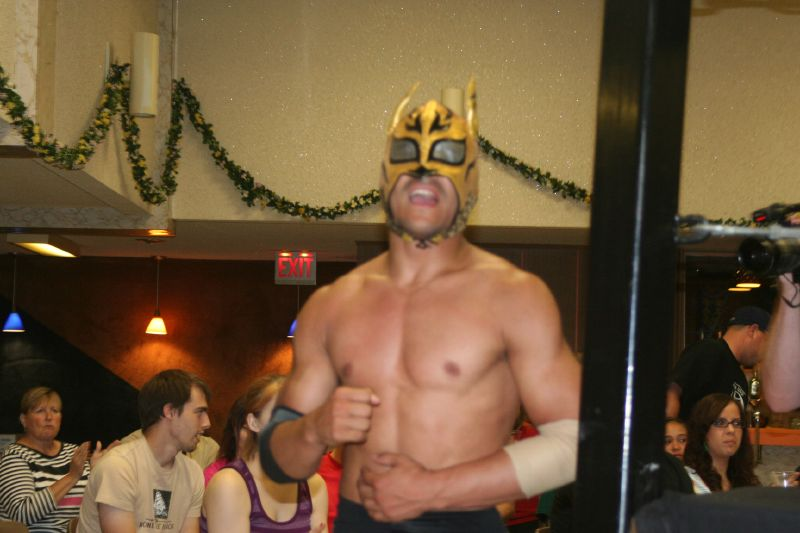
Lince Dorado, one third of the 2008 King of Trios, along with Incognito and El Pantera

The 2008 King of Trios Tournament was held February 29, and March 1 and 2, 2008 at the New Alhambra Arena in Philadelphia, Pennsylvania. The tournament featured 28 teams, up from the 16 of 2007. Team Dr. Keith was originally scheduled to comprise Brodie Lee and the Olsen Twins (Colin Olsen and Jimmy Olsen), but Colin was forced to pull out of the event after signing a contract with World Wrestling Entertainment. His replacement was decided by a random draw. Los Ice Creams' third partner was decided in similar fashion.

Teams

- BLKOUT (Eddie Kingston, Joker and Ruckus)
- The Cold Front (Glacier and Los Ice Creams (El Hijo del Ice Cream and Ice Cream, Jr.))
- The Colony (Fire Ant, Soldier Ant and Worker Ant [I])
- The F1rst Family (Arik Cannon, Darin Corbin and Ryan Cruz)
- The Fabulous Three (Larry Sweeney, Mitch Ryder and Shayne Hawke)
- F.I.S.T. (Chuck Taylor, Gran Akuma and Icarus)
- The Golden Trio (Delirious, Hallowicked and Helios)
- Kaiju's Sea Amigos (Call-Me-Kevin, D.W. Cycloptopuss III and Unibouzu)
- Las Chivas Rayadas (Chiva II, Chiva III and Chiva IV)
- Los Luchadores de Mexico (Incognito, Lince Dorado and El Pantera)
- Mike Quackenbush, Shane Storm and Skayde
- The Naptown Dragons (Dustin Lee, Drake Younger and Scotty Vortekz)
- The Order of the Neo–Solar Temple (Crossbones, Hydra and UltraMantis Black)
- Da Soul Touchaz (Acid Jaz, Marshe Rockett and Willie Richardson)
- The Southern Saints (Marcus O'Neil, Reno Diamond and Shawn Reed)
- Sweet n' Sour Inc. (Bobby Dempsey, Sara Del Rey and Tank Toland)
- Team AZW (AkuA, Immortal Black and Immortal White)
- Team BSE (Kobra Kai, La Sombra Canadiense and Super Xtremo)
- Team DDT (Kudo, Miyawaki and Susumu)
- Team Dr. Keith (Brodie Lee, Jimmy Olsen and Retail Dragon)
- Team Egypt (The Osirian Portal (Amasis and Ophidian) and MECHA Mummy)
- Team El Dorado (Go, Michael Nakazawa and Mototsugu Shimizu)
- Team IPW:UK (Martin Stone, Sha Samuels and Terry Frazier)
- Team IWS (El Generico, Player Uno and Stupefied)
- Team ROH (Alex Payne, Rhett Titus and Shane Hagadorn)
- Team Stranglehold (Andy Sumner, Drew Gulak and Tim Donst)
- Team WTF (Cheech, Cloudy and m.c.KZ)
- Team WWF (One Man Gang and Demolition (Ax and Smash))

Tournament bracket

First round February 29 and March 1
The Cold Front	Pin
Los Luchadores de Mexico	13:29
The F1rst Family	Pin
Team IWS	15:35
Team Egypt	Pin
Quack/Storm/Skayde	14:22
Dr. Keith	Pin
Team WTF	14:11
The Colony	Pin
Team El Dorado	13:44
Las Chivas Rayadas	Pin
Team ROH	11:21
F.I.S.T.	Pin
Sweet 'n' Sour, Inc.	11:47
Da Soul Touchaz	Pin
Team BSE	13:31
Kaiju's Sea Amigos	Pin
Neo–Solar Temple	05:24
The Southern Saints	Pin
Team DDT	10:26
Team IPW:UK	Sub
The Naptown Dragons	12:30
The Fabulous Three	Pin
Team Stranglehold	10:18

Second round February 29 and March 1
Los Luchadores de Mexico	Pin
Team IWS	21:37
Quack/Storm/Skayde	Pin
Team WTF	12:47
The Colony	Pin
Las Chivas Rayadas	11:23
F.I.S.T.	Pin
Da Soul Touchaz	13:09
BLKOUT	Pin
Neo–Solar Temple	09:08
Team DDT	Pin
Team AZW	09:20
The Golden Trio	Sub
Team IPW:UK	16:05
The Fabulous Three	Pin
Team WWF	10:06

Quarter-finals; March 2
Los Luchadores de Mexico	Pin
Quack/Storm/Skayde	19:06
The Colony	Pin
F.I.S.T.	12:49
BLKOUT	Pin
Team DDT	13:44
The Golden Trio	Pin
The Fabulous Three	12:40

Semifinals; March 2
Los Luchadores de Mexico	Pin
The Colony	13:10
BLKOUT	DQ
The Golden Trio	10:32

Final; March 2
Los Luchadores de Mexico	14:45
BLKOUT	Sub

== 2009 ==
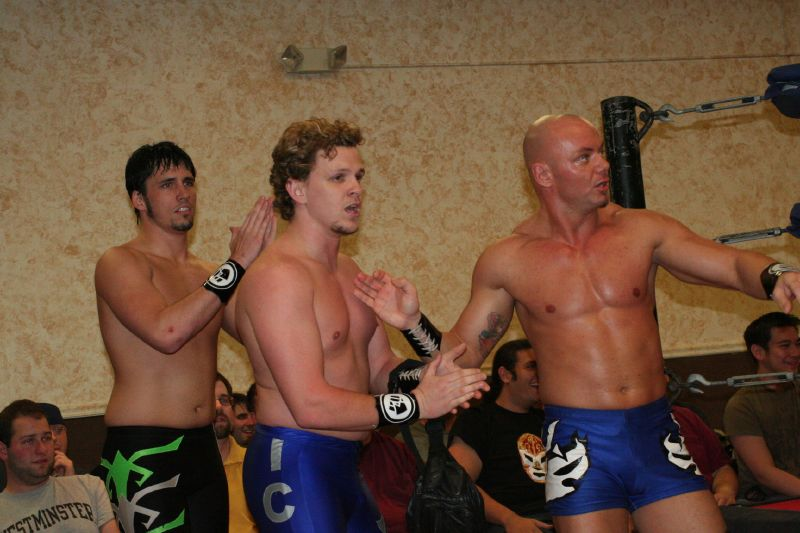
(From left to right) Chuck Taylor, Icarus and Gran Akuma of F.I.S.T., the 2009 King of Trios

The 2009 King of Trios tournament took place over March 27, 28 and 29 at The Arena in Philadelphia, Pennsylvania. This tournament had 16 teams due to the financial troubles of last year (down from the 28 of last year). The Cold Front was originally scheduled to comprise Al Snow, Iceberg and Glacier, but Iceberg could not make it to the show and was replaced by a random draw.

Teams

- The Cold Front 2.0 (Al Snow, D'Lo Brown and Glacier)
- The Death Match Kings (Brain Damage, Necro Butcher and Toby Klein)
- The F1rst Family (Arik Cannon, Darin Corbin and Ryan Cruz)
- F.I.S.T. (Chuck Taylor, Gran Akuma and Icarus)
- The Future is Now (Helios, Equinox and Lince Dorado)
- Incoherence (Delirious, Frightmare and Hallowicked)
- The Masters of a Thousand Holds (Jorge "Skayde" Rivera, Johnny Saint and Mike Quackenbush)
- The Osirian Portal (Amasis, Escorpion Egipcio and Ophidian)
- The Roughnecks (Brodie Lee, Eddie Kingston and Grizzly Redwood)
- Da Soul Touchaz (Marshe Rockett, Trauma and Willie Richardson)
- Team CZW (Beef Wellington, Greg Excellent and Pinkie Sanchez)
- Team DDT (Kota Ibushi, Kudo and Michael Nakazawa)
- Team Epic War (Austin Aries, Ryan Drago and Tony Kozina)
- Team PWG (El Generico, Matt Jackson and Nick Jackson)
- Team Uppercut (Bryan Danielson, Claudio Castagnoli and Dave Taylor)
- The UnStable (Colin Delaney, Stigma and Vin Gerard)

Tournament bracket

First round March 27
The Cold Front 2.0	Pin
The UnStable	26:22
Da Soul Touchaz	Pin
Team CZW	14:56
Incoherence	Pin
Masters of 1,000 Holds	16:43
The Roughnecks	Sub
Team Uppercut	20:38
Team DDT	Sub
The Future is Now	19:39
The Osirian Portal	Pin
Team PWG	16:29
The Death Match Kings	Pin
F.I.S.T.	12:01
The F1rst Family	Pin
Team Epic War	11:43

Quarter-finals; March 28
The UnStable	Pin
Da Soul Touchaz	8:40
Masters of 1,000 Holds	Pin
Team Uppercut	33:35
The Future is Now	Pin
The Osirian Portal	17:53
F.I.S.T.	Pin
The F1rst Family	15:03

Semifinals; March 29
The UnStable	Pin
Team Uppercut	15:17
The Future is Now	Pin
F.I.S.T.	13:31

Final; March 29
Team Uppercut	Sub
F.I.S.T.	11:09

== 2010 ==
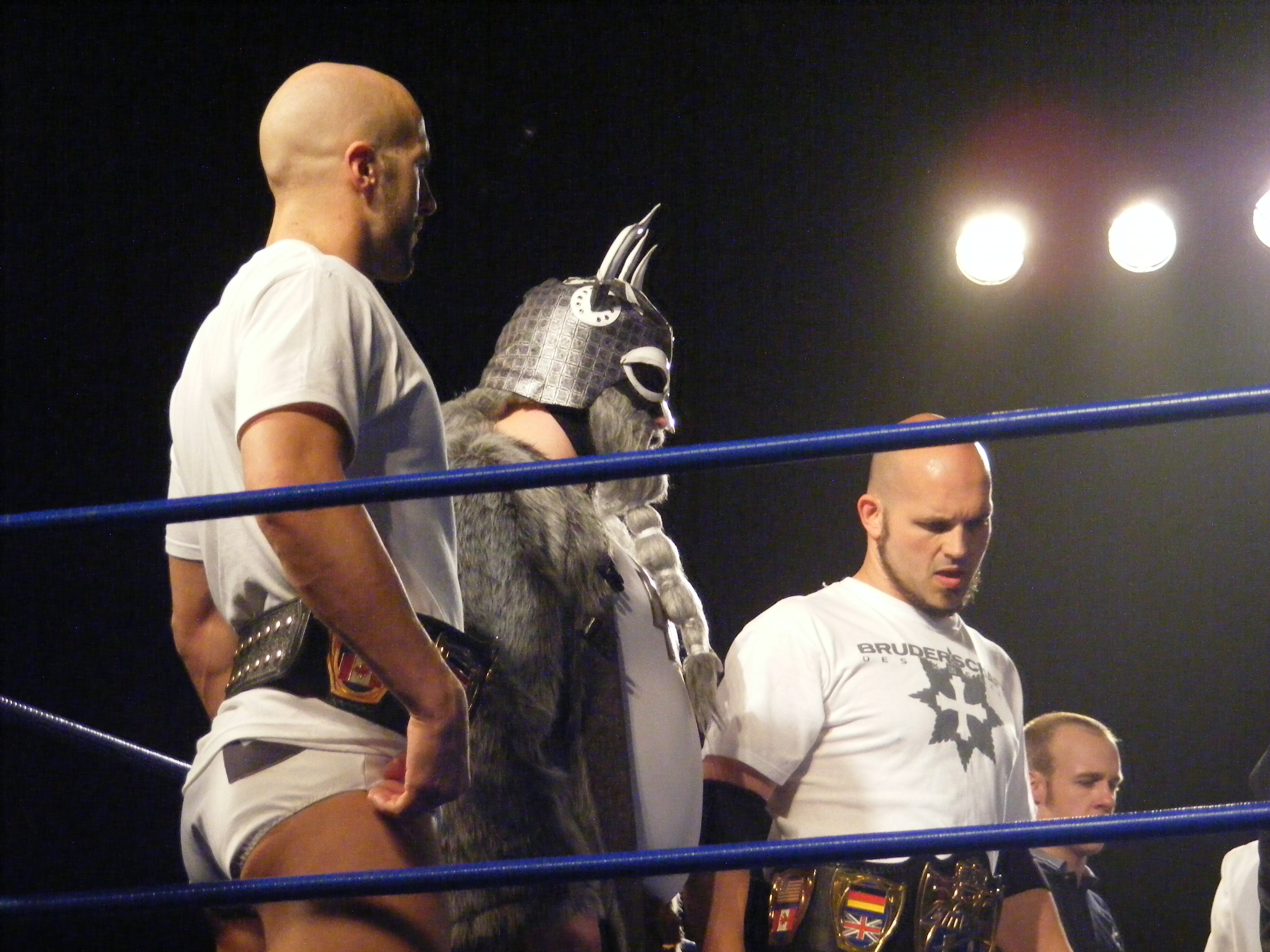
(From left to right) Claudio Castagnoli, Tursas and Ares of the Bruderschaft des Kreuzes, the 2010 King of Trios

The 2010 King of Trios tournament took place April 23, 24 and 25 at The Arena in Philadelphia, Pennsylvania. Like the previous year, 16 teams entered the tournament. The team of Aeroform and Johnny Gargano earned the final spot in the tournament by winning Absolute Intense Wrestling's 16-team Jack of All Trios tournament, held on April 9 and 10. Team Delicioso was originally scheduled to consist of Cassandro, El Hijo del Ice Cream and Ice Cream, Jr., but Cassandro was forced to withdraw from the tournament, after breaking his leg at Ring of Honor's The Big Bang! pay-per-view on April 3. He announced on a blog on Chikara's official website that he had hand-picked his replacement as opposed to letting it be decided by a random draw. On April 9 Curry Man was revealed as the replacement. Originally Team Mexico (Jorge "Skayde" Rivera, Turbo and Valiente) was scheduled to enter the tournament, but on April 22 the company announced that both Valiente and Turbo were off the event and that as a result they were severing all ties with Rivera, who was in charge of bringing the two to the event and who reportedly tried to hold the company up for more money, despite failing to deliver Valiente and Turbo, who had already taken bookings elsewhere for the weekend. Their replacement trio, who ended up being the team of The Osirian Portal (Amasis and Ophidian) and Sara Del Rey, was decided at the event by a random draw.

Teams

- Bruderschaft des Kreuzes (Ares, Claudio Castagnoli and Tursas)
- Bruderschaft des Kreuzes (Lince Dorado, Pinkie Sanchez and Tim Donst)
- The Colony (Fire Ant, Green Ant [I] and Soldier Ant)
- The F1rst Family (Arik Cannon, Darin Corbin and Ryan Cruz)
- F.I.S.T. (Chuck Taylor, Gran Akuma and Icarus)
- The Future is Now (Equinox, Helios and Jigsaw)
- The Jackson 3 (Malachi Jackson, Matt Jackson and Nick Jackson)
- The Osirian Portal (Amasis and Ophidian) and Sara Del Rey
- Team Big Japan Wrestling (Daisuke Sekimoto, Kankuro Hoshino and Yuji Okabayashi)
- Team Delicioso (Curry Man, El Hijo del Ice Cream and Ice Cream, Jr.)
- Team Frightning (Frightmare, Hallowicked and Mike Quackenbush)
- Team Oreo (Flip Kendrick, Louis Lyndon and Johnny Gargano)
- Team Osaka Pro (Atsushi Kotoge, Daisuke Harada and Tadasuke)
- Team Perros del Mal (El Alebrije, Cuije and El Oriental)
- The Throwbacks (Dasher Hatfield, Matt Classic and Sugar Dunkerton)
- The UnStable (Colin Delaney, Stigma and Vin Gerard)

Tournament bracket

First round April 23
The UnStable	Pin
Team Osaka Pro	09:55
F.I.S.T.	Pin
The Throwbacks	13:43
The F1rst Family	Sub
Dorado/Sanchez/Donst	18:40
The Colony	Pin
Aeroform/Gargano	14:10
Ares/Castagnoli/Tursas	Pin
Osirian Portal/Del Rey	11:01
Team Perros del Mal	Pin
Team Delicioso	15:50
The Future is Now	Pin
The Jackson 3	19:24
Team Big Japan Wrestling	Sub
Team Frightning	11:12

Quarter-finals; April 24
Team Osaka Pro	Pin
F.I.S.T.	14:27
Dorado/Sanchez/Donst	Sub
The Colony	18:51
Ares/Castagnoli/Tursas	Pin
Team Perros del Mal	09:46
The Future is Now	Pin
Team Big Japan Wrestling	13:35

Semifinals; April 25
Team Osaka Pro	Pin
The Colony	08:58
Ares/Castagnoli/Tursas	Pin
Team Big Japan Wrestling	14:12

Final; April 25
The Colony	Pin
Ares/Castagnoli/Tursas	13:30

== 2011 ==
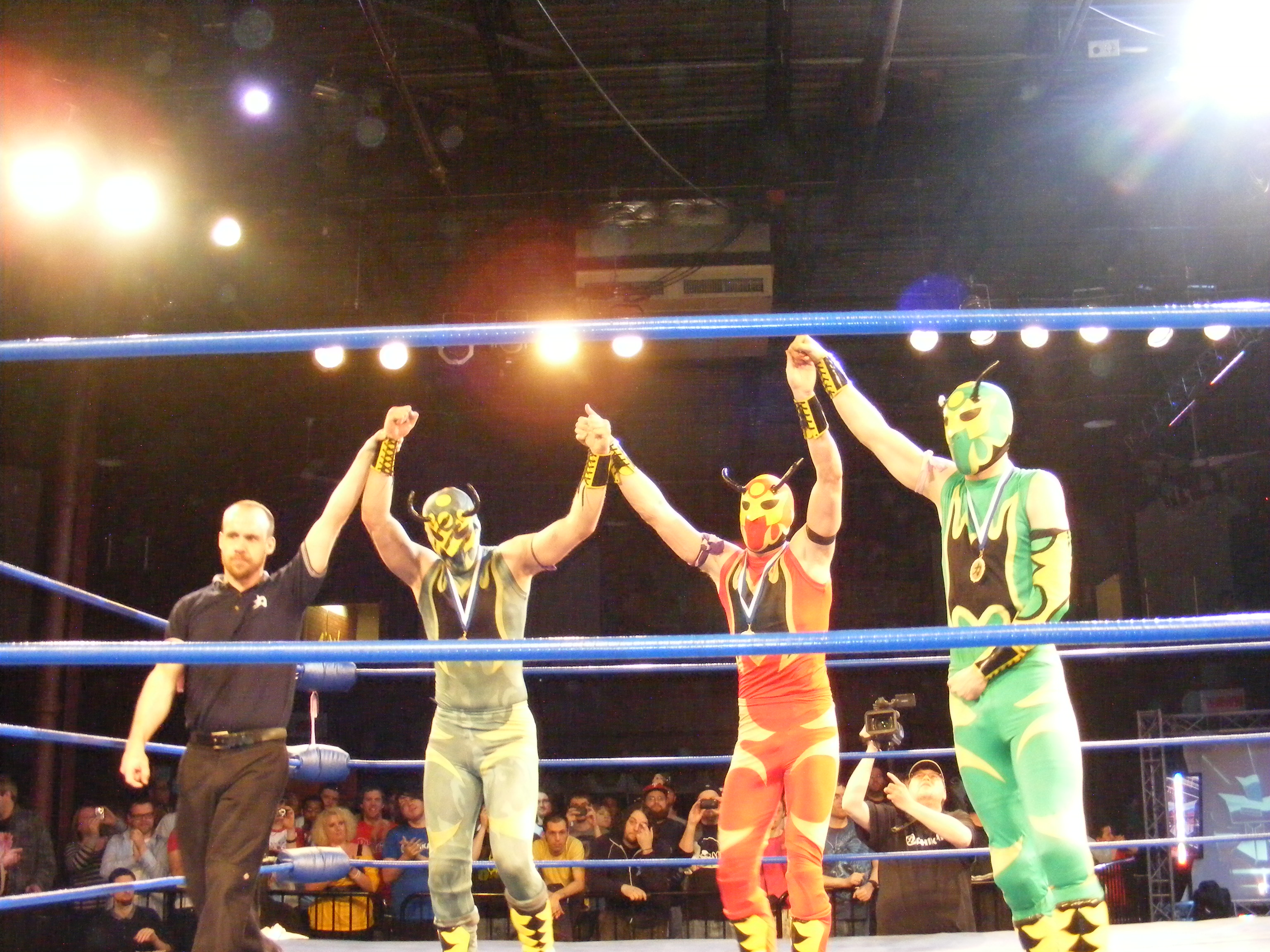
(From left to right) Soldier Ant, Fire Ant and Green Ant of The Colony, the 2011 King of Trios

The 2011 King of Trios tournament took place April 15, 16 and 17 at the Asylum Arena in Philadelphia, Pennsylvania. As in the two previous years, 16 teams entered the tournament. The tournament marked the first time all scheduled participants were able to make it to the shows. The tournament was dedicated to the memory of Chikara Wrestle Factory graduate Alex Whybrow, better known as Larry Sweeney, who died on April 11, 2011. The whole tournament was released on DVD by Smart Mark Video on April 18, less than 24 hours after its conclusion.

Teams

- ¡3.0lé! (El Generico, Scott Parker and Shane Matthews)
- Amazing Red and The Maximos (Joel Maximo and Wil Maximo)
- The Batiri (Kodama and Obariyon) and Sinn Bodhi
- Bruderschaft des Kreuzes (Delirious, Jakob Hammermeier and Tim Donst)
- The Colony (Fire Ant, Green Ant [I] and Soldier Ant)
- Da Soul Touchaz (Acid Jaz, Marshe Rockett and Willie Richardson)
- F.I.S.T. (Chuck Taylor, Icarus and Johnny Gargano)
- Jigsaw, Manami Toyota and Mike Quackenbush
- The Osirian Portal (Amasis, Hieracon and Ophidian)
- The Spectral Envoy (Frightmare, Hallowicked and UltraMantis Black)
- Team Australia (Kabel, Percy T and Tama Williams)
- Team Dragon Gate (Akira Tozawa, Kagetora and Super Shisa)
- Team Michinoku Pro (Dick Togo, Great Sasuke and Jinsei Shinzaki)
- Team Minnesota (1–2–3 Kid, Arik Cannon and Darin Corbin)
- Team Osaka Pro (Atsushi Kotoge, Daisuke Harada and Ultimate Spider Jr.)
- The Throwbacks (Dasher Hatfield, Matt Classic and Sugar Dunkerton)

Tournament bracket

First round April 15
Dragon Gate	Pin
Spectral Envoy	13:34
¡3.0lé!	Pin
Osirian Portal	18:12
The Colony	Pin
Batiri/Bodhi	16:32
BDK	Pin
Da Soul Touchaz	11:23
Australia	Pin
F.I.S.T.	11:13
The Throwbacks	Pin
Osaka Pro	17:04
Michinoku Pro	Pin
Minnesota	22:51
Jigsaw/Toyota/Quackenbush	Pin
Red/Maximos	10:11

Quarter-finals; April 16
Dragon Gate	Pin
Osirian Portal	21:08
The Colony	Sub
BDK	13:05
F.I.S.T.	Pin
Osaka Pro	19:15
Michinoku Pro	Pin
Jigsaw/Toyota/Quackenbush	21:28

Semifinals; April 17
Osirian Portal	Pin
The Colony	16:01
F.I.S.T.	Pin
Michinoku Pro	16:13

Final; April 17
The Colony	Pin
F.I.S.T.	20:51

== 2012 ==
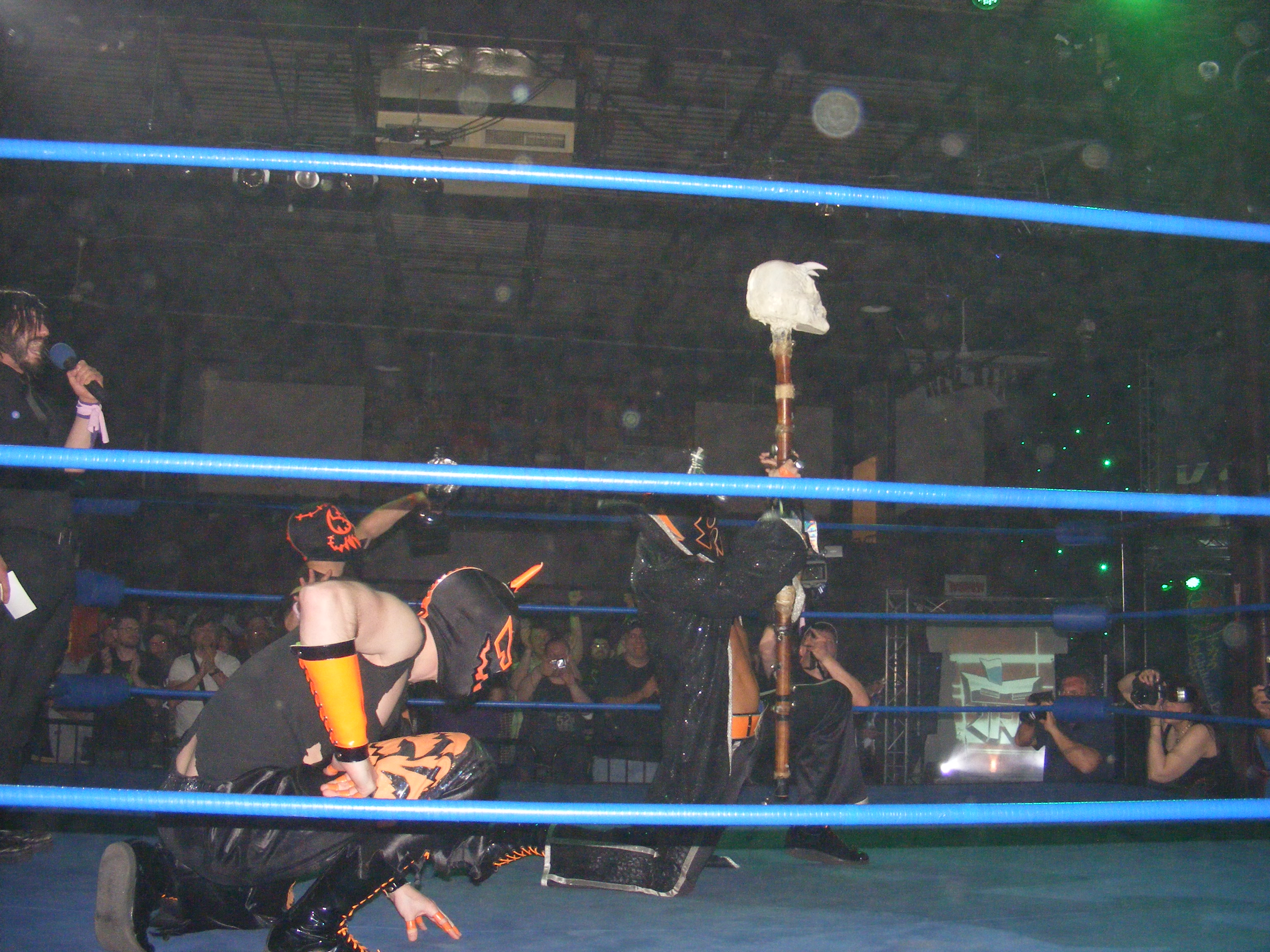
Frightmare (back left), Hallowicked (front left) and UltraMantis Black (right) of the Spectral Envoy, the 2012 King of Trios

The 2012 King of Trios tournament took place September 14, 15 and 16 in Easton, Pennsylvania. The tournament featured the first ever all-female trios, representing the Japanese JWP Joshi Puroresu and Sendai Girls' Pro Wrestling promotions. Submission Squad (Davey Vega, Evan Gelistico, Gary Jay and Pierre Abernathy) was originally scheduled to become the first quartet in the history of King of Trios, but were unable to make the event due to "travel issues". They were replaced by the team of Mihara, The Mysterious and Handsome Stranger and Tito Santana, a team decided supposedly by a random draw. Submission Squad did however show up later that night and attempted to force their way into the arena. They were subsequently turned away and thrown out.

Teams

- The Batiri (Kobald, Kodama and Obariyon)
- The Colony (AassailANT, Fire Ant and Green Ant [I])
- The Extreme Trio (Jerry Lynn, Tommy Dreamer and Too Cold Scorpio)
- The Faces of Pain (The Barbarian, Meng and The Warlord)
- F.I.S.T. (Chuck Taylor, Icarus and Johnny Gargano)
- Gran Akuma and 3.0 (Scott Parker and Shane Matthews)
- Jigsaw, Manami Toyota and Mike Quackenbush
- Mihara, The Mysterious and Handsome Stranger and Tito Santana
- The Spectral Envoy (Frightmare, Hallowicked and UltraMantis Black)
- The Swarm (CombatANT, DeviANT and Soldier Ant)
- Team JWP (Command Bolshoi, Kaori Yoneyama and Tsubasa Kuragaki)
- Team Osaka Pro (Ebessan, Kikutaro and Takoyakida)
- Team Ring of Honor (Matt Jackson, Mike Bennett and Nick Jackson)
- Team Sendai Girls (Dash Chisako, Meiko Satomura and Sendai Sachiko)
- Team WWF (1–2–3 Kid, Aldo Montoya and Tatanka)
- The Throwbacks (Dasher Hatfield, Mark Angelosetti and Matt Classic)

Tournament bracket

First round September 14
Osaka Pro	Pin
F.I.S.T.	21:02
JWP	Sub
The Throwbacks	12:42
3.0 and Akuma	Pin
The Batiri	11:08
The Spectral Envoy	Pin
Mihara/Stranger/Santana	16:28
Jigsaw/Toyota/Quackenbush	Pin
The Swarm	14:34
The Colony	Pin
Sendai Girls	12:30
Faces of Pain	Pin
Ring of Honor	12:42
Team WWF	Pin
Extreme Trio	20:50

Quarter-finals; September 15
F.I.S.T.	Sub
JWP	12:59
The Batiri	Pin
The Spectral Envoy	11:41
Jigsaw/Toyota/Quackenbush	Pin
Sendai Girls	12:43
Ring of Honor	Pin
Extreme Trio	21:27

Semifinals; September 16
F.I.S.T.	Pin
The Spectral Envoy	11:53
Sendai Girls	Pin
Ring of Honor	10:16

Final; September 16
The Spectral Envoy	Sub
Ring of Honor	20:28

== 2014 ==
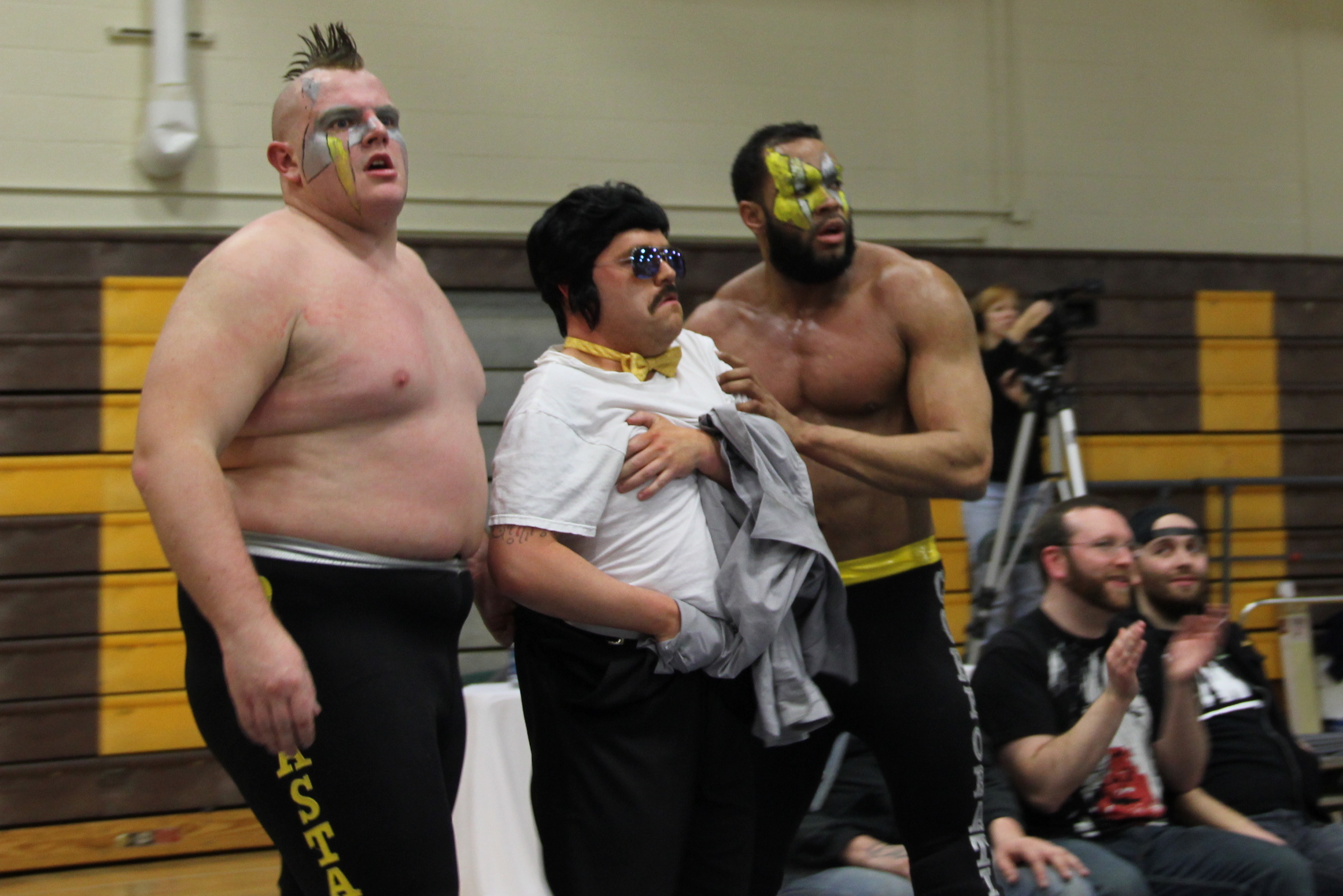
(Left) Max Smashmaster and (right) Blaster McMassive of the Devastation Corporation, the 2014 King of Trios

The 2014 King of Trios tournament took place September 19, 20 and 21 in Easton, Pennsylvania. The streams of each night were available on demand 10 hours after the conclusion of each. On September 23, the entire tournament was released on Blu-ray for the first time.

Teams

- 3peck0 (Archibald Peck, Scott Parker and Shane Matthews)
- BDK^{3} (Ares, Doctor Cube and Nøkken)
- The Bloc Party (Mr. Azerbaijan, Prakash Sabar and The Proletariat Boar of Moldova)
- The Colony (Fire Ant, Silver Ant and Worker Ant [II])
- The Colony: Xtreme Force (Arctic Rescue Ant, Missile Assault Ant and Orbit Adventure Ant)
- The Devastation Corporation (Blaster McMassive, Flex Rumblecrunch and Max Smashmaster)
- The Flood (Eddie Kingston, Jimmy Jacobs and Volgar)
- Gekido (17, Jigsaw and The Shard)
- The Golden Trio (Dasher Hatfield, Icarus and Mark Angelosetti)
- KE4TPG (Jolly Roger, Lance Steel and Princess KimberLee)
- Kizarny & his Odditorium (Qefka the Quiet, Sinn Bodhi and Sir Oliver Grimsly)
- LAX (Chavo Guerrero Jr., Hernandez and Homicide)
- The Spectral Envoy (Frightmare, Hallowicked and UltraMantis Black)
- The Spirit Squad (Johnny, Kenny and Mikey)
- Team Extravaganza (Jervis Cottonbelly, Marion Fontaine and ThunderKitty)
- Team UK (Damian Dunne, Mark Andrews and Pete Dunne)

Tournament bracket

First round September 19
BDK^{3}	Pin
3peck0
KE4TPG	Sub
Gekido
Team UK	Pin
The Bloc Party
Team Extravaganza	Pin
Devastation Corporation
The Flood	Pin
The Spectral Envoy
The Colony: Xtreme Force	Pin
The Colony
Kizarny & his Odditorium	Pin
The Spirit Squad
LAX	Pin
The Golden Trio

Quarter-finals; September 20
3peck0	Sub
Gekido
Team UK	Pin
Devastation Corporation
The Flood	Pin
The Colony
The Spirit Squad	Sub
The Golden Trio

Semifinals; September 21
3peck0	Pin
Devastation Corporation
The Flood	Sub
The Golden Trio

Final; September 21
Devastation Corporation	Pin
The Golden Trio

== 2015 ==
The 2015 King of Trios tournament took place September 4, 5 and 6 in Easton, Pennsylvania. MK McKinnan was originally announced for the tournament as part of Team Fight Club: Pro, but was on August 25 replaced by Daniel Moloney.

Teams

- Arcane Horde (Kodama, Obariyon and Oleg the Usurper)
- Battleborn (Kevin Condron, Lucas Calhoun and Missile Assault Man)
- Battle Hive (Amasis, Fire Ant and Worker Ant [II])
- Bruderschaft des Kreuzes (Jakob Hammermeier, Nøkken and Soldier Ant)
- The Bullet Club (A.J. Styles, Matt Jackson and Nick Jackson)
- Crown & Court (El Hijo del Ice Cream, Ice Cream Jr. and Princess KimberLee)
- Dasher's Dugout (Dasher Hatfield, Icarus and Mark Angelosetti)
- Devastation Corporation (Blaster McMassive, Flex Rumblecrunch and Max Smashmaster)
- The Gentleman's Club (Chuck Taylor, Drew Gulak and the Swamp Monster)
- Nightmare Warriors (Frightmare, Hallowicked and Silver Ant)
- Snake Pit (Eddie Kingston, Ophidian and Shynron)
- Team AAA (Aero Star, Drago and Fénix)
- Team Attack! (Mark Andrews, Morgan Webster and Pete Dunne)
- Team bWo (Big Stevie Cool, Da Blue Guy and Hollywood Nova)
- Team Fight Club: Pro (Daniel Moloney, Trent Seven and Tyler Bate)
- United Nations (Juan Francisco de Coronado, Mr. Azerbaijan and The Proletariat Boar of Moldova)

Tournament bracket

First round September 4
United Nations	Pin
Team Attack!
BDK	Pin
Fight Club: Pro
Battleborn	Pin
Dasher's Dugout
Battle Hive	Pin
Bullet Club
Crown & Court	Pin
Arcane Horde
Devastation Corporation	Pin
bWo
Nightmare Warriors	Pin
Snake Pit
Gentleman's Club	Pin
Team AAA

Quarter-finals; September 5
United Nations	Pin
Fight Club: Pro
Battleborn	Pin
Bullet Club
Arcane Horde	Pin
Devastation Corporation
Nightmare Warriors	Pin
Team AAA

Semifinals; September 6
Fight Club: Pro	Pin
Bullet Club
Devastation Corporation	Pin
Team AAA

Final; September 6
Bullet Club	Pin
Team AAA

== 2016 ==
The 2016 King of Trios tournament took place September 2, 3 and 4 in Easton, Pennsylvania. Madison Eagles was originally announced as part of Team Shimmer, but had to drop out due to an injury. Her spot was taken by Solo Darling. The Big Deal was originally announced for the tournament as part of Team Big Deal alongside Rick Roland and Sloan Caprice, but was also forced to pull out due to an injury. They were replaced by The Submission Squad.

Teams

- The Batiri (Kobald, Kodama and Obariyon)
- The Colony (Fire Ant, Silver Ant and Soldier Ant)
- Heidi Lovelace and N_R_G (Hype Rockwell and Race Jaxon)
- The HeXed Men (Hallowicked, Icarus and Jigsaw)
- Just a Lot of Ants (Bullet Ant, Missile Assault Man and Worker Ant [II])
- Major League Moustache (Dasher Hatfield, Trent Seven and Tyler Bate)
- The Snake Pit (Amasis, Argus and Ophidian)
- The Submission Squad (Davey Vega, Gary Jay and Pierre Abernathy)
- Team #CWC (Cedric Alexander, Drew Gulak and Johnny Gargano)
- Team JWP (Command Bolshoi, Hanako Nakamori and Manami Katsu)
- Team Original Divas Revolution (Jazz, Mickie James and Victoria)
- Team Police Squad (Detective Bill Carr, Officer Warren Barksdale and Supercop Dick Justice)
- Team Sendai Girls (Cassandra Miyagi, Dash Chisako and Meiko Satomura)
- Team Shimmer (Candice LeRae, Crazy Mary Dobson and Solo Darling)
- United Nations (Juan Francisco de Coronado, Prakash Sabar and The Proletariat Boar of Moldova)
- The Warriors Three (Oleg the Usurper, Princess KimberLee and ThunderFrog)

Tournament bracket

First round September 2
The Batiri	Pin
Major League Moustache
Just a Lot of Ants	Pin
The HeXed Men
Team Police Squad	Sub
United Nations
The Snake Pit	Pin
Team JWP
Warriors Three	Pin
Team #CWC
Team Original Divas Revolution	Pin
Team Shimmer
Submission Squad	Pin
The Colony
Lovelace/N_R_G	Pin
Team Sendai Girls

Quarter-finals; September 3
Major League Moustache	Pin
The HeXed Men
United Nations	Pin
Team JWP
The Warriors Three	Pin
Original Divas Revolution
The Colony	Sub
Team Sendai Girls

Semifinals; September 4
The HeXed Men	DQ
Team JWP
The Warriors Three	Sub
Team Sendai Girls

Final; September 4
Team JWP	Pin
Team Sendai Girls

== 2017 ==
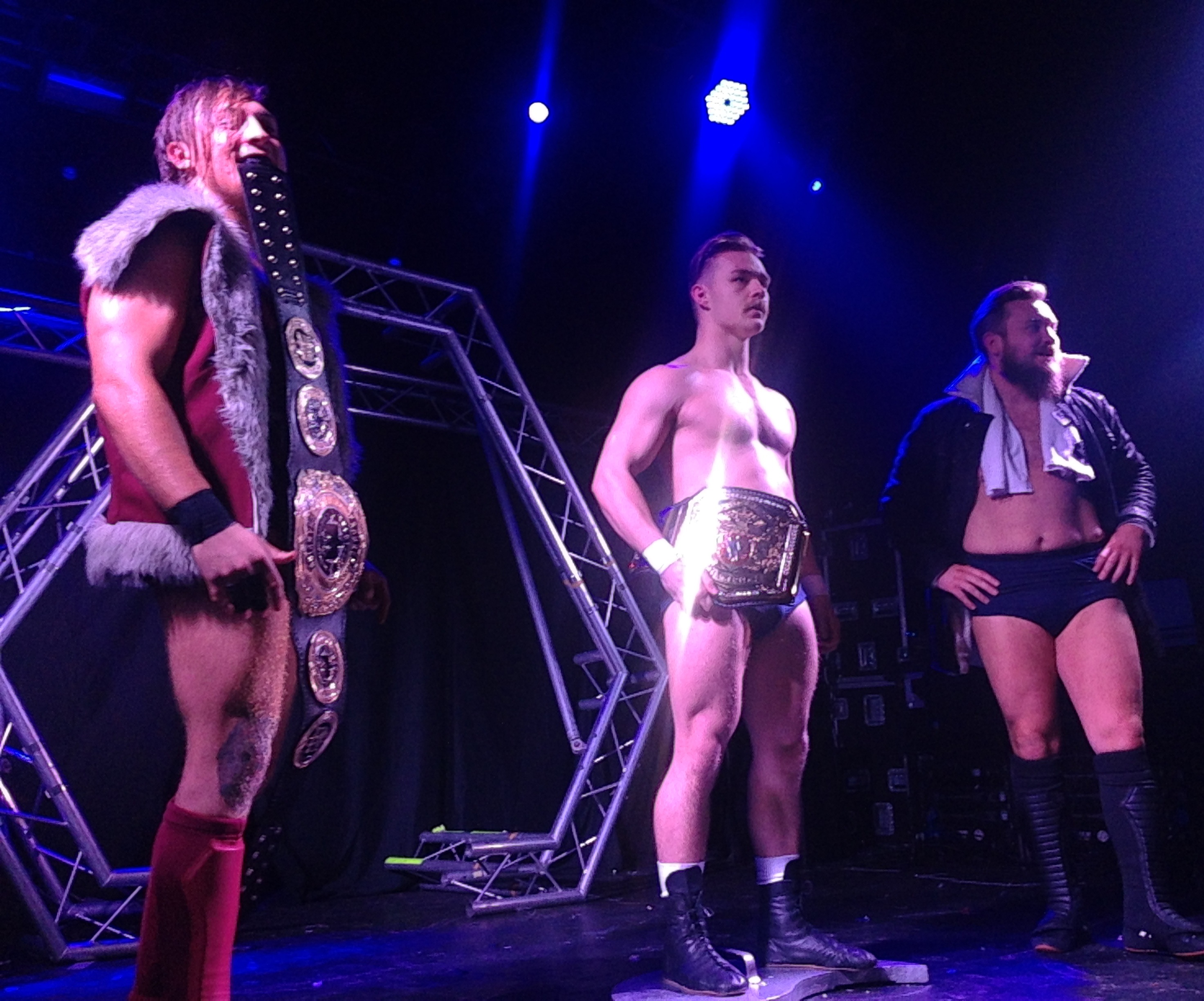
(From left to right) Pete Dunne, Tyler Bate and Trent Seven, the 2017 King of Trios

The 2017 King of Trios tournament took place on September 1, 2 and 3 in Wolverhampton, England. Originally announced in February 2017 as taking place in Birmingham, the tournament was moved to the larger venue in June.

Teams

- Casa Dorada (Juan Francisco de Coronado, Cornelius Crummels and Sonny Defarge)
- House Attack (Chief Deputy Dunne, Jim Obstruction and Lee Obstruction)
- House Bike Cops (Donald Kluger, Jasper Tippins and Officer Warren Barksdale)
- House Bodyslam (Emeritus, Michael Fynne and Vasyl)
- House Calamari (Chris Brookes, Elijah and Kid Lykos)
- House Fight Club (Kyle Fletcher, Millie McKenzie and Omari)
- House Furies (Fire Ant, Solo Darling and Travis Huckabee)
- House Revival (Jody Fleisch, Johnny Moss and Jonny Storm)
- House Rot (Frightmare, Hallowicked and Kobald)
- House Sendai Girls (Cassandra Miyagi, Dash Chisako and Meiko Satomura)
- House Seven Seas (Cajun Crawdad, Hermit Crab and Merlok)
- House of Sport (Danny Boy Collins, James Mason and Mal Sanders)
- House Strong Style (Pete Dunne, Trent Seven and Tyler Bate)
- House Throwbacks (Dasher Hatfield, Mark Angelosetti and Simon Grimm)
- House WhiteWolf (A-Kid, Adam Chase and Zayas)
- House Xyberhawx (Nytehawk, Razerhawk and Sylverhawk)

Tournament bracket

First round September 1
House of Sport	Pin
Casa Dorada
House Bike Cops	Pin
House Calamari
House Sendai Girls	Pin
House Xyberhawx
House Revival	Pin
House Seven Seas
House Rot	Pin
House Bodyslam
House Fight Club	Sub
House Furies
House Strong Style	Pin
House WhiteWolf
House Attack	Pin
House Throwbacks

Quarter-finals; September 2
Casa Dorada	Pin
House Calamari
House Sendai Girls	Pin
House Seven Seas
House Rot	DQ
House Furies
House Strong Style	Pin
House Throwbacks

Semifinals; September 3
Casa Dorada	Pin
House Sendai Girls
House Rot	Forfeit
House Strong Style

Final; September 3
House Sendai Girls	Pin
House Strong Style

== 2018 ==
The 2018 King of Trios tournament took place on August 31, September 1 and 2 in Easton, Pennsylvania.

- Teams
  - Ancient Order of the Nations (Mick Moretti, Jack Bonza, and Adam Hoffman)
  - Dark Lords of the Proteus (Volgar, Callux, and Frantik)
  - The F.I.S.T. Order (Icarus, Travis Huckabee, and Tony Deppen)
  - Galactic Wildlife Commission (ThunderFrog, Air Wolf, and Wildcat)
  - The Millennium Throwbacks (Dasher Hatfield, Mark Angelosetti, and Boomer Hatfield)
  - The New Republic (El Hijo del Ice Cream, Ice Cream, Jr, and Kikutaro)
  - The Nexus Alliance (P. J. Black, Michael Tarver, and Fred Rosser)
  - The Ohnaka Gang (Rey Bucanero, Pierre Carl Ouellet, and Katarina Leigh)
  - Raiders of the Beyond (Chris Dickinson, Cam Zagami, and Brian Milonas)
  - The Regime (Juan Francisco de Coronado, Rick Roland, and Sloan Caprice)
  - The ResistANTce (Fire Ant, Green Ant [II], and Thief Ant)
  - The Shimmer Collective (Madison Eagles, Shazza McKenzie, and Jessica Troy)
  - Sisters of the Mighty (Solo Darling, Molly Holly, and Aja Perera)
  - Society of the Deep (Merlok, Hermit Crab, and Cajun Crawdad)
  - Tokyo Joshi Freedom Fighters (Miyu Yamashita, Yuka Sakazaki, and Shoko Nakajima)
  - Xyberhawx Techno Union (Razerhawk, Nytehawk, and Danjerhawk)

Tournament bracket

First round August 31
Xyberhawx Techno Union	Pin
Ancient Order of the Nations
Society of the Deep	Pin
The Ohnaka Gang
The New Republic	Pin
Sisters of the Mighty
The Shimmer Collective	Pin
Tokyo Joshi Freedom Fighters
The ResistANTce	Pin
Dark Lords of the Proteus
Galactic Wildlife Commission	Sub
The F.I.S.T. Order
The Nexus Alliance	Pin
The Regime
Raiders of the Beyond	Referee Stoppage
The Millennium Throwbacks

Quarter-finals; September 1
Ancient Order of the Nations	Sub
The Ohnaka Gang
The New Republic	Pin
Tokyo Joshi Freedom Fighters
The ResistANTce	Sub
The F.I.S.T. Order
The Nexus Alliance	Pin
Raiders of the Beyond

Semifinals; September 2
Ancient Order of the Nations	Pin
Tokyo Joshi Freedom Fighters
The ResistANTce	Pin
Raiders of the Beyond

Final; September 2
Ancient Order of the Nations	Sub
The ResistANTce

== 2019 ==
The 2019 King of Trios tournament took place on October 4, 5 and 6 in Reading, Pennsylvania.

- Teams
  - The Carnies (Nick Iggy, Kerry Awful, and Tripp Cassidy)
  - The Colony (Fire Ant, Green Ant [II], and Thief Ant)
  - The Creatures of the Deep (Oceanea, Merlok, and Hermit Crab)
  - The Crucible (Ophidian, Princess KimberLee, and Lance Steel)
  - The Crucible (Devantes, Matt Makowski, and E.M. DeMorest)
  - The Embassy (Prince Nana, Jimmy Rave, and Sal Rinauro)
  - F.I.S.T. (Icarus, Travis Huckabee, and Tony Deppen)
  - Hatfields & McCoy (Dasher Hatfield, Boomer Hatfield, and Molly McCoy)
  - Karate Kat Xtreme (Lucas Calhoun, Missile Assault Man, and Stray Kat)
  - The Legion of Rot (Hallowicked, Frightmare, and Kobald)
  - The Nations (Mick Moretti, Jack Bonza, and Adam Hoffman)
  - Quack Attack (Mike Quackenbush, Lance Lude, and Rob Killjoy)
  - Queens (Solo Darling, Willow Nightingale, and Freddie Mercurio)
  - Team Nerder Death Kris (Nick Gage, Thomas Santell, and Kris Statlander)
  - Team Pump (Scott Steiner, Petey Williams, and Jordynne Grace)
  - VeloCities (Paris De Silva, Jude London, and Mat Diamond)

Tournament bracket

First round October 4
Ophidian/KimberLee/Steel
VeloCities
Queens
Devantes/Makowski/DeMorest
Hatfields & McCoy
Creatures of the Deep
The Colony
Quack Attack
The Nations
Karate Kat Xtreme
Team Pump
Team Nerder Death Kris
Legion of Rot
The Carnies
F.I.S.T.
The Embassy

Quarter-finals; October 5
Ophidian/KimberLee/Steel
Devantes/Makowski/DeMorest
Hatfields & McCoy
The Colony
The Nations
Team Pump
The Carnies
F.I.S.T.

Semifinals; October 6
Ophidian/KimberLee/Steel
The Colony
The Nations
F.I.S.T.

Final; October 6
Ophidian/KimberLee/Steel
The Nations
