= Batiri =

Professional wrestling stable

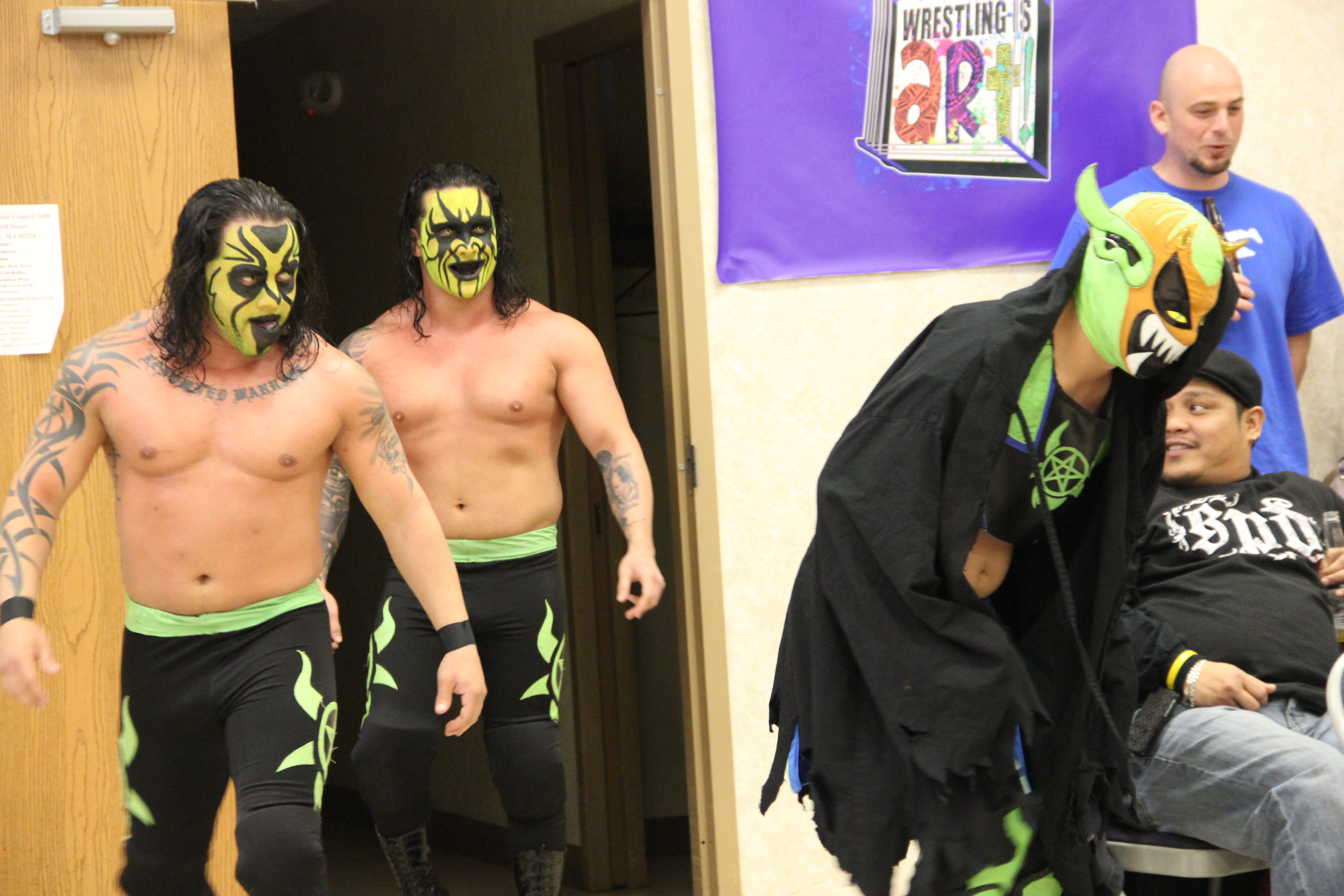
- (Left to right) Kodama, Obariyon and Kobald of the Batiri

Stable
- Name: Batiri
- Members: Kobald; Kodama; Obariyon
- Billed heights: Kobald: 5 ft 8 in (1.73 m); Kodama: 5 ft 7 in (1.70 m) "Dark, Diabolical Demon"; Obariyon: 5 ft 8 in (1.73 m)
- Combined billed weight: Kobald: 166 lb (75 kg); Kodama: 185 lb (84 kg); Obariyon: 192 lb (87 kg)
- Billed from: Bled Island
- Debut: Kobald: February 20, 2011; Kodama: September 18, 2010; Obariyon: August 28, 2010
- Years active: 2010–present
- Trained by: Claudio Castagnoli; Mike Quackenbush Johnny Rodz (Obariyon/Kodama)

The Batiri are a professional wrestling alliance who perform on the independent circuit. They are best known for their time in the now-defunct Chikara promotion. The team includes Kodama and Obariyon, who work under face paint with the wrestling characters of demons, and Kobald, who performs under a goblin mask. Both Kodama's and Obariyon's ring names come from Japanese folklore from the characters of Kodama (木霊, Kodama) and Obariyon (おばりよん, Obariyon), while Kobald is named after the German word for goblin. All three men were trained at Chikara's Wrestle Factory by then head trainers Claudio Castagnoli and Mike Quackenbush. They have also made appearances for promotions like Beyond Wrestling, Collective League of Adrenaline Strength and Honor (CLASH), STAR Pro-Wrestling, Wrestling is Fun! (WiF!), and Absolute Intense Wrestling (AIW).

== History ==
=== The Dark Army (2010–2011) ===
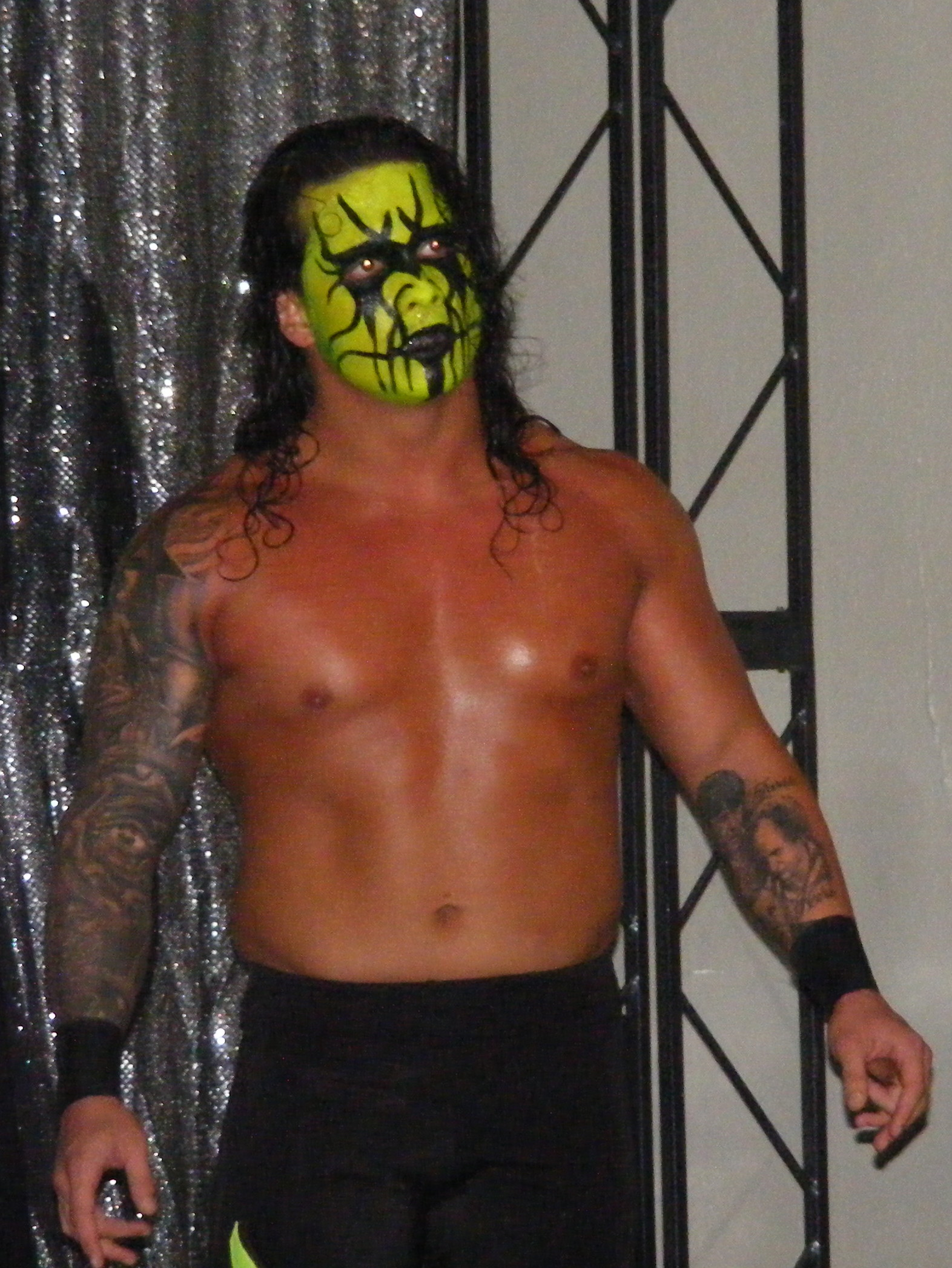
Obariyon making his debut on August 28, 2010

On August 28, 2010, Obariyon made his professional wrestling debut for the Chikara promotion, defeating Dustin Rayz in the first round of the Young Lions Cup VIII tournament. Unlike all other rookies in the tournament, Chikara never explained who Obariyon was and where he had come from. Later that same day, he took part in a six-way elimination semifinal match, from which he eliminated both Adam Cole and Keita Yano, before being eliminated himself by Ophidian. The following day, Obariyon defeated Mike Sydal in a non-tournament singles match. On September 18, Obariyon entered a four-way tag team match, teaming with the debuting Kodama, with the two wearing identical attire and face paint. The two were the second team eliminated from the match by The Osirian Portal (Amasis and Ophidian). In their next appearance on October 23, Kodama and Obariyon picked up a big tag team win over former Chikara Campeones de Parejas, the Super Smash Bros. of Player Uno and Player Dos, and followed that up by defeating another set of former champions, The Osirian Portal, on November 20. The following day, Kodama and Obariyon revealed themselves as the two mysterious hooded men, who had been following UltraMantis Black since July. However, when they went to help UltraMantis during his Falls Count Anywhere match against rival Ares, a third hooded figure appeared and summoned the two away from the ringside area, leading to UltraMantis losing the match to Ares, who was helped by his Bruderschaft des Kreuzes (BDK) stablemate Tursas. During the season finale on December 12, the third hooded figure revealed himself as Sinn Bodhi and demanded that UltraMantis hand him the Eye of Tyr, a mysterious artifact that could in storyline be used to control minds. When UltraMantis was unable to produce the artifact, Bodhi led Obariyon, Kodama and a third masked man, who was later named Kobald, into an attack on UltraMantis, who was then saved by Frightmare and Hallowicked. Two days later UltraMantis revealed shed light on the storyline around him, Bodhi and The Batiri in a blog entry on Chikara's official website, claiming that after the debut of BDK, he had gone soul searching and ran into three strange beings, who, while a possible asset to his stable, the Order of the Neo-Solar Temple, needed training. UltraMantis could not send them to the Chikara Wrestle Factory, which was run by BDK leader Claudio Castagnoli and turned to his old acquaintance Sinn Bodhi for help. In storyline, Bodhi trained the three in exchange for the Eye of Tyr, but UltraMantis claimed that he never agreed to hand him the artifact, which in fact was no longer even in his possession as it had been stolen by Ares.

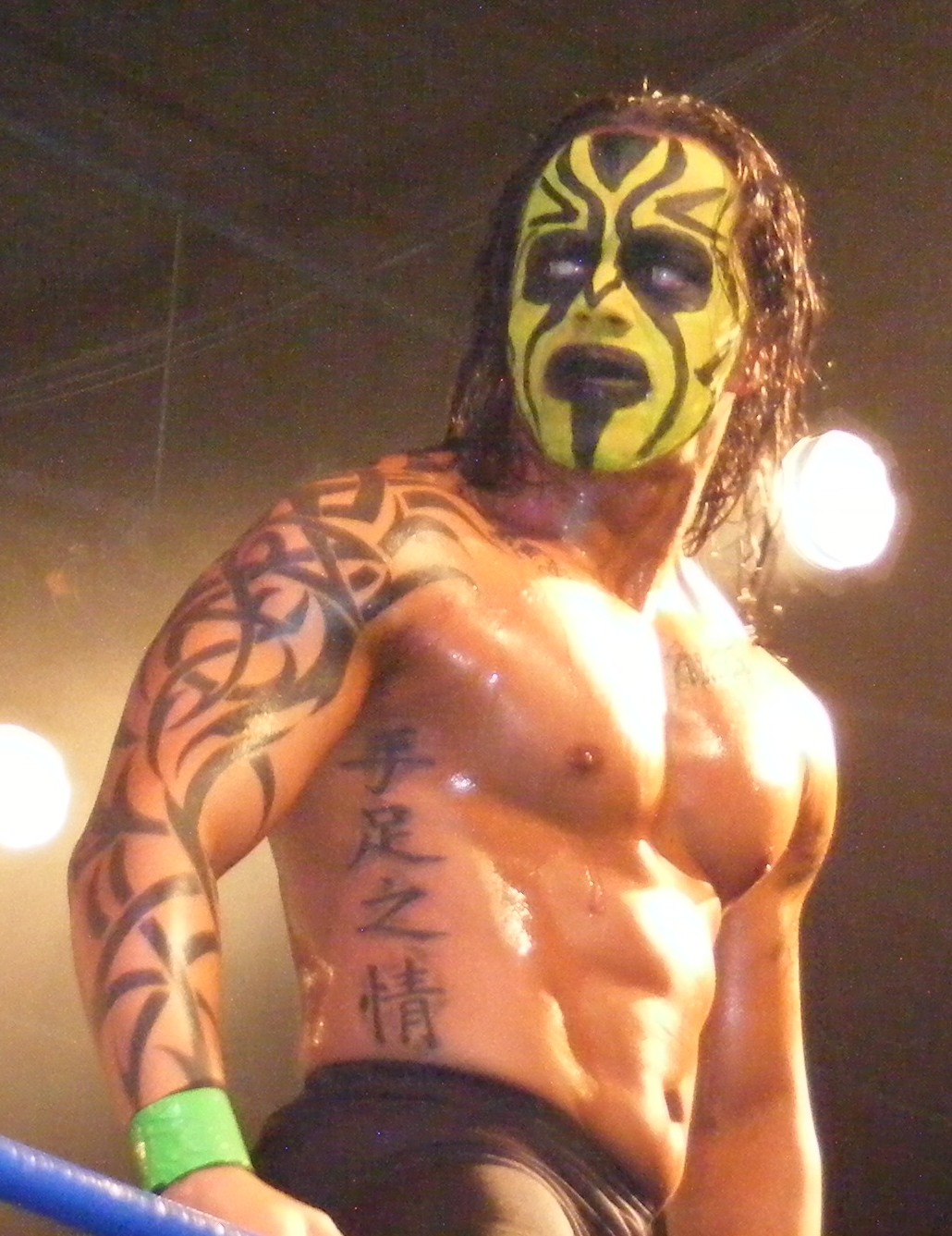
Kodama in April 2011

Season ten of Chikara opened with the group of Kobald, Kodama and Obariyon being given the name "The Batiri" and their alliance with Sinn Bodhi "The Dark Army". The three were also given background stories. Kodama, a demon, was supposedly born of two tree spirits, who sacrificed their son and sent him to hell in exchange for their own freedom. Eventually, Kodama was cast out of hell, after being deemed "too vulgar even for the Devil". Obariyon, another demon, was supposedly a mercenary monster minion who served demon lords across "all three realms". After his final tour as the "General of the Demon Army", Obariyon retired to Bled Island in Slovenia. Kobald, a goblin, supposedly "hatched" twenty years earlier and mutilated women and children of Slovenia, before getting caught and being banished to Bled Island, where he met Kodama and Obariyon. The three also took credit for the extinction of the dinosaurs, claimed to have conquered Mesopotamia twice and claimed that the Maya civilization had foretold their arrival and that they would cause the end of the world on December 21, 2012. At the season premiere on January 23, 2011, Kodama and Obariyon defeated Frightmare and Hallowicked to earn their third point, or third back-to-back win, which in turn earned them their first shot at the Campeonatos de Parejas. Kodama and Obariyon received their title opportunity in a Two Out of Three Falls match on February 19, but were defeated by the defending champions, Jigsaw and Mike Quackenbush, two falls to one. The following day, The Batiri, with Kobald making his in-ring debut, defeated their rival team, the Spectral Envoy (Frightmare, Hallowicked and UltraMantis Black), in a six-man tag team match. On March 12, Sinn Bodhi returned to Chikara and made his in-ring debut in a six-man tag team match, where he, Kodama and Obariyon were defeated by The Osirian Portal (Amasis, Hieracon and Ophidian) via disqualification. The following day, Obariyon unsuccessfully challenged Frightmare for the Chikara Young Lions Cup.

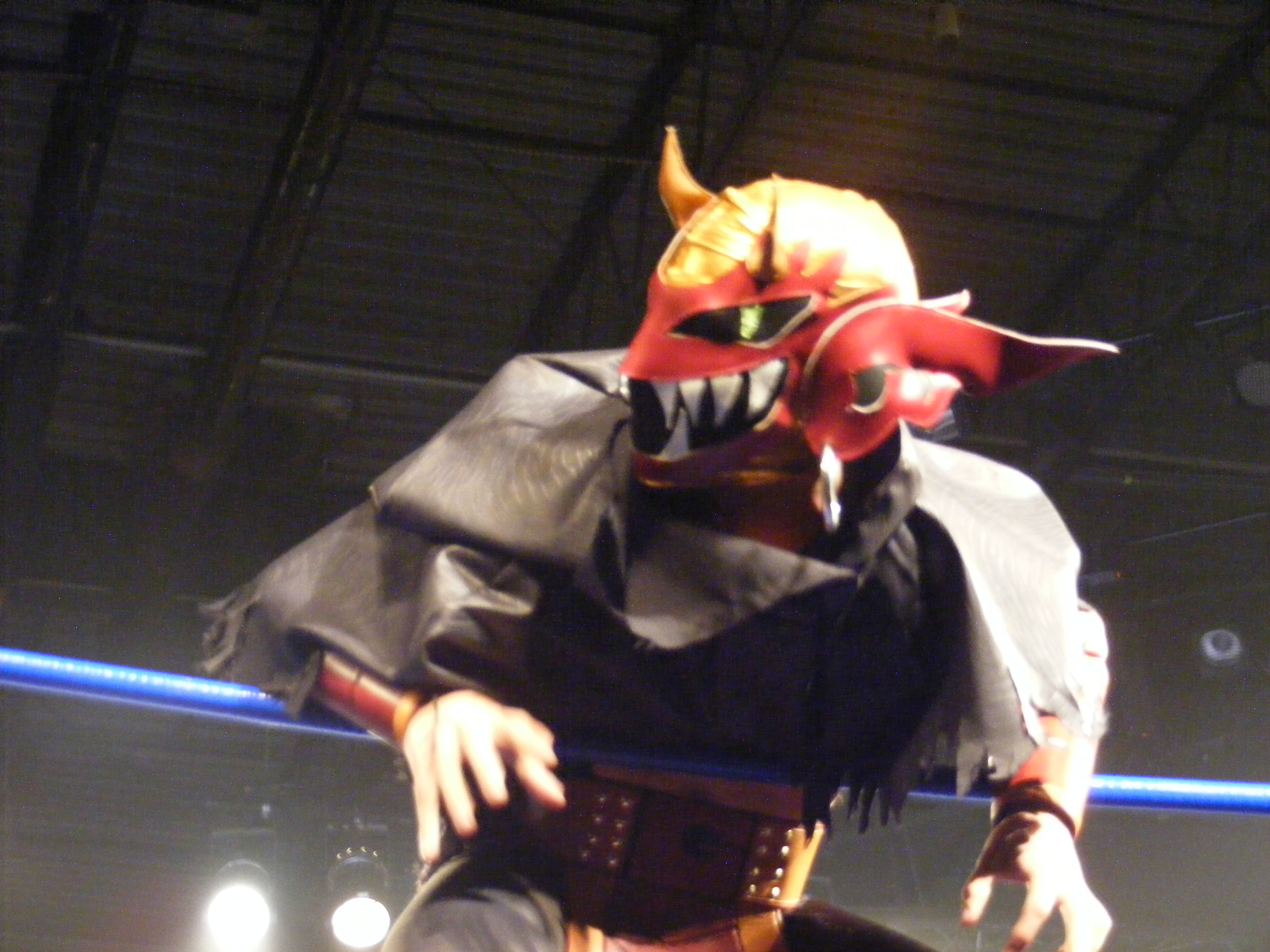
Kobald in April 2011

On April 15, Kodama, Obariyon and Bodhi entered the 2011 King of Trios tournament, however, the team was eliminated in their first round match by The Colony (Fire Ant, Green Ant and Soldier Ant), who went on to win the entire tournament. The following day, Obariyon entered a four-way first round match in the annual Rey de Voladores tournament. After eliminating Amazing Red from the match, Obariyon was himself eliminated by Frightmare. On the third and final day of the tournament, Kodama and Obariyon took part in the annual tag team gauntlet match, from which they eliminated Arik Cannon and Darin Corbin, before being eliminated themselves by The Throwbacks (Dasher Hatfield and Sugar Dunkerton). Kodama and Obariyon avenged the loss against The Throwbacks during the anniversary weekend on May 21, and the following day, the two teamed with Sinn Bodhi in a six-man tag team match, where they scored another win over the Spectral Envoy. On August 27, both Kobald and Obariyon entered the Young Lions Cup IX tournament, taking part in different first round four-way matches; Kobald was eliminated from the first by Green Ant and Obariyon from the second by Chase Owens. The rivalry between The Dark Army, and the Spectral Envoy culminated on September 18 in an eight-man tag team match, where Kobald, Kodama, Obariyon and Sinn Bodhi were defeated by Crossbones, Frightmare, Hallowicked and UltraMantis Black. After being pinned by UltraMantis, Bodhi disappeared from Chikara, ending The Dark Army. Afterwards, Kobald took over the role of the mouthpiece of The Batiri. On December 4, The Batiri took part in Chikara's special post-season JoshiMania weekend, teaming with Toshie Uematsu, who wore similar face paint as Kodama and Obariyon, in an eight-person tag team match, where they defeated Cherry and The Colony.

=== Alliance with Delirious and Ophidian (2012–2013) ===
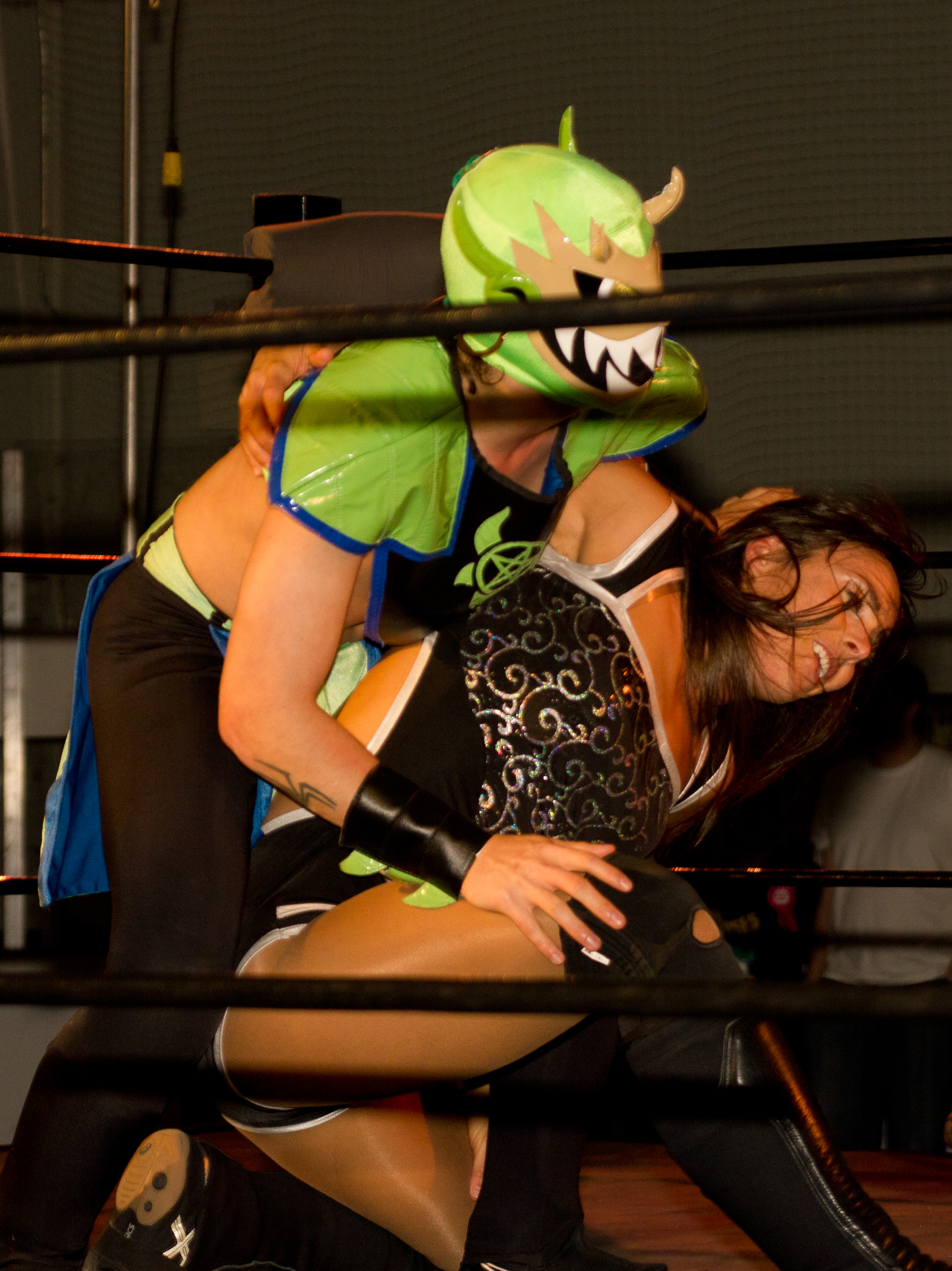
Kobald holding Sara Del Rey in an abdominal stretch in March 2012

In early 2012, The Batiri entered a storyline, where the stable's members started badmouthing female wrestler Sara Del Rey on their Twitter account. This led to a match on March 24, where Kobald defeated Del Rey, following interference from his stablemates. On April 14, Del Rey scored a singles win over Kodama, but was afterwards attacked by The Batiri. After Obariyon scored another tainted win over Del Rey on April 29, all three members of The Batiri once again attacked her, leading to rookie luchadora Saturyne making the save. Saturyne herself had lost a match to Kobald back on April 14 and had received threats of her own from The Batiri, so she offered to team with Del Rey against The Batiri at the Chikarasaurus Rex: How to Hatch a Dinosaur internet pay-per-view (iPPV). At the event on June 2, The Batiri lost the match via disqualification, when Delirious entered the ring and attacked both Del Rey and Saturyne. He then kissed all members of The Batiri on the forehead, before leaving the ringside area with them. The Batiri then aligned themselves with Ophidian and Delirious in their rivalry with UltraMantis Black, with Delirious claiming that as monsters they were discriminated against and true power lied in those who are victim to discrimination. On July 28, Kobald entered the Young Lions Cup X tournament, but was eliminated in his first round four-way match by Anthony Stone. On September 14, Kobald, Kodama and Obariyon entered the 2012 King of Trios tournament with the sole goal of preventing UltraMantis Black from achieving his dream and winning the tournament. The Batiri opened the tournament by defeating the team of Gran Akuma, Scott Parker and Shane Matthews in their first round match. However, the following day, they were eliminated from the tournament in the quarterfinals by the Spectral Envoy of Frightmare, Hallowicked and UltraMantis Black. Afterwards, The Batiri, along with Ophidian, attacked the victors, and during the following day's finals tried to do the same with Delirious, but were stopped by the returning Crossbones. As a result, the Spectral Envoy managed to win the King of Trios, foiling Delirious' plan. On November 10, The Batiri and Ophidian cost Hallowicked and UltraMantis Black their title match with Chikara Campeones de Parejas, The Young Bucks (Matt Jackson and Nick Jackson). The rivalry between the teams led by Delirious and UltraMantis Black culminated on December 2 at Chikara's third iPPV and season eleven finale, Under the Hood, where the Spectral Envoy, represented by UltraMantis Black, Blind Rage, Crossbones, Frightmare and Hallowicked, defeated Delirious, Kobald, Kodama, Obariyon and Ophidian in a ten-man tag team match. On April 6, 2013, Kodama and Obariyon earned their third point and another shot at the Campeonatos de Parejas by winning a four-way elimination match, which included the teams of Blind Rage and UltraMantis Black, The Devastation Corporation (Blaster McMassive and Max Smashmaster), and The Throwbacks (Dasher Hatfield and Mark Angelosetti). They received their title shot on May 4, but were defeated by the defending champions, 3.0 (Scott Parker and Shane Matthews), two falls to one. On May 18, Kodama and Obariyon made it to the semifinals of the 2013 Tag World Grand Prix, before losing to The Young Bucks.

=== Tecnico turn (2013–2015) ===
Following June's Aniversario: Never Compromise Chikara went inactive for eight months, during which The Batiri, despite being rudos, came together with other Chikara wrestlers to fight for the return of the promotion against the Flood, a united group of rudos from its past. The storyline culminated on February 1, 2014, during the second National Pro Wrestling Day, where the Chikara roster defeated the united group in a mass brawl, leading to the promotion announcing its return. On May 25 at Chikara's return event, You Only Live Twice, The Batiri defeated Sinn Bodhi and the Odditorium (Oliver Grimsly and Qefka the Quiet) via disqualification following a low blow by Bodhi. At the end of the event, Kobald was in storyline killed during a brawl between the Chikara roster and the Flood. Afterwards, Kobald was removed from Chikara's roster, while Kodama and Obariyon continued wrestling together as a tag team. In early 2015, both Kodama and Obariyon, alongside Oleg the Usurper, were drafted by UltraMantis Black as part of his team "The Arcane Horde" in the Challenge of the Immortals tournament. Kodama and Obariyon also represented the Arcane Horde in September's King of Trios, where they, alongside Oleg the Usurper, made it to the quarterfinals, before losing to the Devastation Corporation (Blaster McMassive, Flex Rumblecrunch and Max Smashmaster). On November 7, Kobald returned to replace UltraMantis Black in the Arcane Horde following UltraMantis' retirement from professional wrestling. In storyline, Kobald had spent the past 18 months in "another realm" and was now a changed "goblin" because of it, looking to atone for his past actions.

=== The HeXed Men (2016) ===
On May 7, 2016, Kodama and Obariyon entered a storyline, where their minds were taken over by UltraMantis Black, adding them to a new rudo group which also included Frightmare, Hallowicked and Icarus. They were eventually also joined by Kobald.

== Championships and accomplishments ==
- Absolute Intense Wrestling
  - AIW Tag Team Championship (2 times) – Kodama and Obariyon (1), and Kobald, Kodama and Obariyon (1)^{1}
- Blitzkrieg! Pro Wrestling
  - Blitzkrieg! Pro Tag Team Championship (1 time) – Kodama and Obariyon
- STAR Pro-Wrestling
  - STAR Pro Tag Team Championship (1 time) – Kodama and Obariyon
- Wrestling is Fun!
  - Wrestling is 24/7 Championship (2 times) – Kobald

^{1}During the second reign, Kobald was allowed to defend the title alongside Kodama and Obariyon under the Freebird Rule.
