= The Colony (professional wrestling) =

Professional wrestling

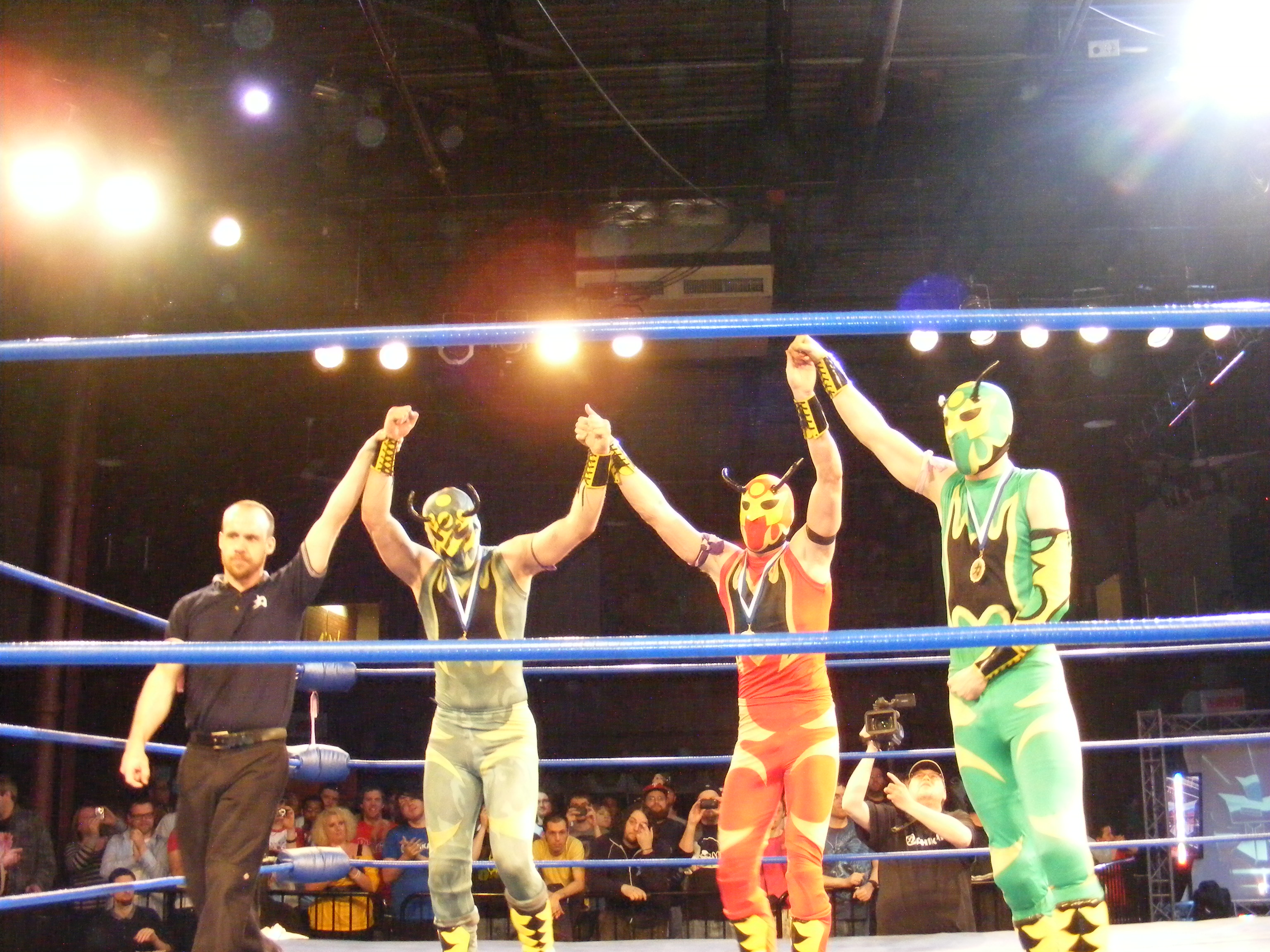
- Soldier Ant, Fire Ant and Green Ant (later known as Silver Ant) in April 2011, celebrating their King of Trios victory

Stable
- Name(s): The Colony; Team Colony; The ResistANTce
- Members: Carpenter Ant; Fire Ant; Green Ant (I)/Silver Ant; Green Ant (II)/Electro Ant; Soldier Ant; Thief Ant/Ultimo Ant; Worker Ant (I); Worker Ant (II)
- Billed heights: Fire Ant: 5 ft 10 in (1.78 m); Silver Ant: 6 ft 2 in (1.88 m); Soldier Ant: 5 ft 9 in (1.75 m); Worker Ant (II): 5 ft 11 in (1.80 m)
- Combined billed weight: Fire Ant: 175 lb (79 kg); Silver Ant: 195 lb (88 kg); Soldier Ant: 200 lb (91 kg); Worker Ant (II): 220 lb (100 kg)
- Billed from: The Ant Hill
- Debut: Fire Ant and Soldier Ant: February 25, 2006; Worker Ant: November 17, 2006; Silver Ant: February 20, 2009; Carpenter Ant: May 24, 2009; Worker Ant (II): August 1, 2009
- Trained by: Fire Ant, Soldier Ant and Worker Ant: Chris Hero; Mike Quackenbush; Skayde; Silver Ant: Claudio Castagnoli; Mike Quackenbush

The Colony was a professional wrestling stable, best known for performing for Chikara. As their name suggests, their gimmick is that of an ant colony, which is further reinforced with their names being based on particular ants (Fire Ant, Green Ant / Silver Ant, Carpenter Ant, and Thief Ant) and classes within an ant colony (Soldier Ant and the first and second Worker Ants).

Originally debuting at the 2006 Tag World Grand Prix as a tag team consisting of Fire Ant and Soldier Ant, The Colony later grew to include a number of new members. Since debuting, The Colony has seen championship success in singles, tag team and trios competition. In Chikara, Fire Ant and Soldier Ant are one time Campeones de Parejas, Fire Ant is a one time Young Lions Cup Champion, Fire Ant and Soldier Ant won the 2008 Tag World Grand Prix, Carpenter Ant won the 2009 Torneo Cibernetico and Fire Ant, Soldier Ant and Green Ant (now known as Silver Ant) won the 2011 King of Trios. The Colony disbanded in 2017 after all but Fire Ant and Worker Ant (II) left Chikara but reformed when the team of Fire Ant, and rookies Thief Ant, and the second Green Ant, previously known as The ResistANTce, won the 2018 King of Trios.

In addition to Chikara, the group has seen success in other promotions. Silver Ant is a one-time Wrestling is Fun! (WiF!) 24/7 Champion (as Green Ant) and won Chilanga Mask's 2015 Torneo de Parejas alongside Ophidian, the second Worker Ant (as assailAnt) is a one-time WiF! Banana Champion, and Fire Ant won the 2014 Forza Lucha Cup. Furthermore, Fire Ant (under his current ring name of "Freshly Squeezed" Orange Cassidy) has won several independent wrestling titles and is the longest-reigning AEW International Championship belt holder.

== History ==
=== Chikara ===
==== Debut (2006–2007) ====
After being trained by both Mike Quackenbush and Chris Hero, Fire Ant and Soldier Ant debuted as Team Colony at the 2006 Tag World Grand Prix, where they lost in the first round to Lancelot (Lance Steel and Lance Steel). Team Colony became technicos on the undercard and often teamed with fellow masked wrestler Equinox in trios matches. Later in the year, Fire Ant made a brief singles run as he participated in the fourth Young Lions Cup tournament, which he did not win. Near the end of the year, a third Ant known as Worker Ant, who was also trained by Quackenbush and Hero, joined Team Colony on November 17 to expand the tag team into a stable and thus resulting in the group's name being tweaked to The Colony. Soon after joining, Worker Ant became the group's mouthpiece, as he spoke for them in their promos.

The Colony would become one of the more prominent acts in Chikara in 2007 due to increasingly entertaining and innovative matches as a trio, and a heated feud with the rudo BLKOUT stable, a feud which the Colony would win in September with a decisive victory on the Cibernetico undercard.

==== Feud with The UnStable (2008–2009) ====
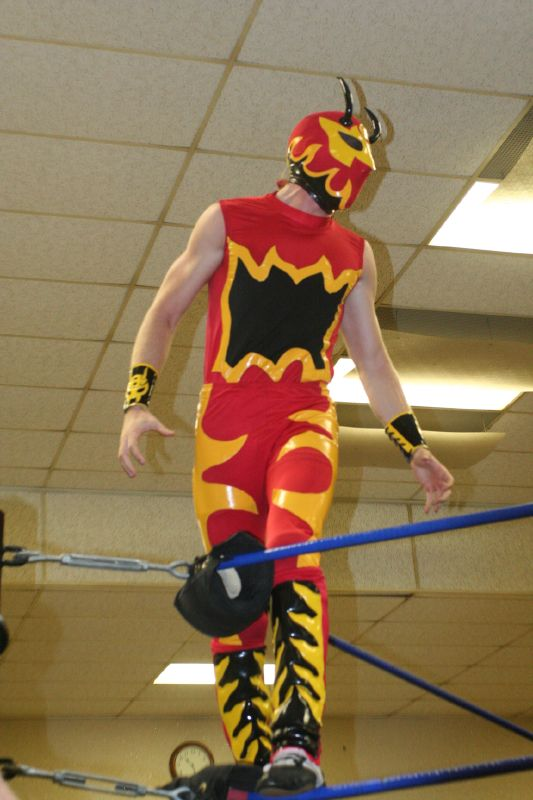
Fire Ant in 2008

Beginning in 2008, Fire Ant once again began competing semi-regularly as a singles wrestler and began a heated feud with former ally Equinox, who had since unmasked himself and began competing under his real name (Vin Gerard). At the Young Lions Cup tournament on June 15, Fire Ant defeated Gerard for the Cup in a match that garnered significant praise from both the company and fans. However, the following month on July 13, Gerard gained revenge by defeating Fire Ant in a rematch for the Cup after utilizing the cup itself as a weapon, resulting in Fire Ant having the shortest title reign in Chikara history. Soon after the loss, Gerard successfully managed to manipulate technico Shane Storm into aligning with him, effectively renaming him STIGMA. Gerard and STIGMA would feud with The Colony until September 7, when the two aligned with the returning Colin Delaney to form the UnStable, and thus evening the numbers of both groups. At the 2008 Tag World Grand Prix, Fire Ant and Soldier Ant represented The Colony as the stable made its second appearance in the tournament. The Colony would go on to defeat the Fight Club in the opening round, their rivals the UnStable in the semi-finals and both The Osirian Portal and Martin Stone and Pac in the finals to win the tournament.

Now with a staggering seven points towards Campeonatos de Parejas contention, Fire Ant and Soldier Ant issued their challenge to the reigning Campeones The Osirian Portal for January 25, 2009. Owing to the number of points they accumulated, Director of Fun Leonard F. Chikarason allowed the Colony to choose their own stipulations for the match. They decreed that the match would be one fall instead of the conventional two-out-of-three falls, and the Portal's third member, Escorpion Egipcio, would be banned from ringside. Despite the stipulations, the Colony failed to win the title.

==== Rebuilding and Campeonatos de Parejas (2009–2010) ====
On February 20, the Colony lost to Team F.I.S.T. (Icarus, Gran Akuma and Chuck Taylor) after Worker Ant was pinned by Icarus. After the match, Taylor performed his Awful Waffle on Worker Ant onto the floor outside the ring, resulting in Worker Ant suffering (kayfabe) cranial injuries. Soon after the attack, a fourth Ant, later identified as Green Ant, made his debut to help tend to the injured Worker Ant. It was then announced on Chikara's website that Worker Ant retired from wrestling due to the severity of his injuries and that Green Ant would fill in for his absence. On May 24, Fire Ant and Soldier Ant, with Green Ant in their corner, defeated Icarus and Chuck Taylor in a Mask vs. Hair match, resulting in Icarus and Taylor having their heads shaved. When Gran Akuma attempted to interfere in the closing moments of the match, a new brown-colored Ant, Carpenter Ant, ran out to ringside to fend off Akuma's attack. During Chikara's June tour of Big Japan Pro Wrestling, Kazuhiko Miyakami wore the costume of Green Ant after it was stolen by Chuck Taylor. The real Green Ant made his wrestling debut on July 31, 2009, in a six-man tag team match, where The Colony defeated The Order of the Neo-Solar Temple (UltraMantis Black, Delirious and Crossbones).

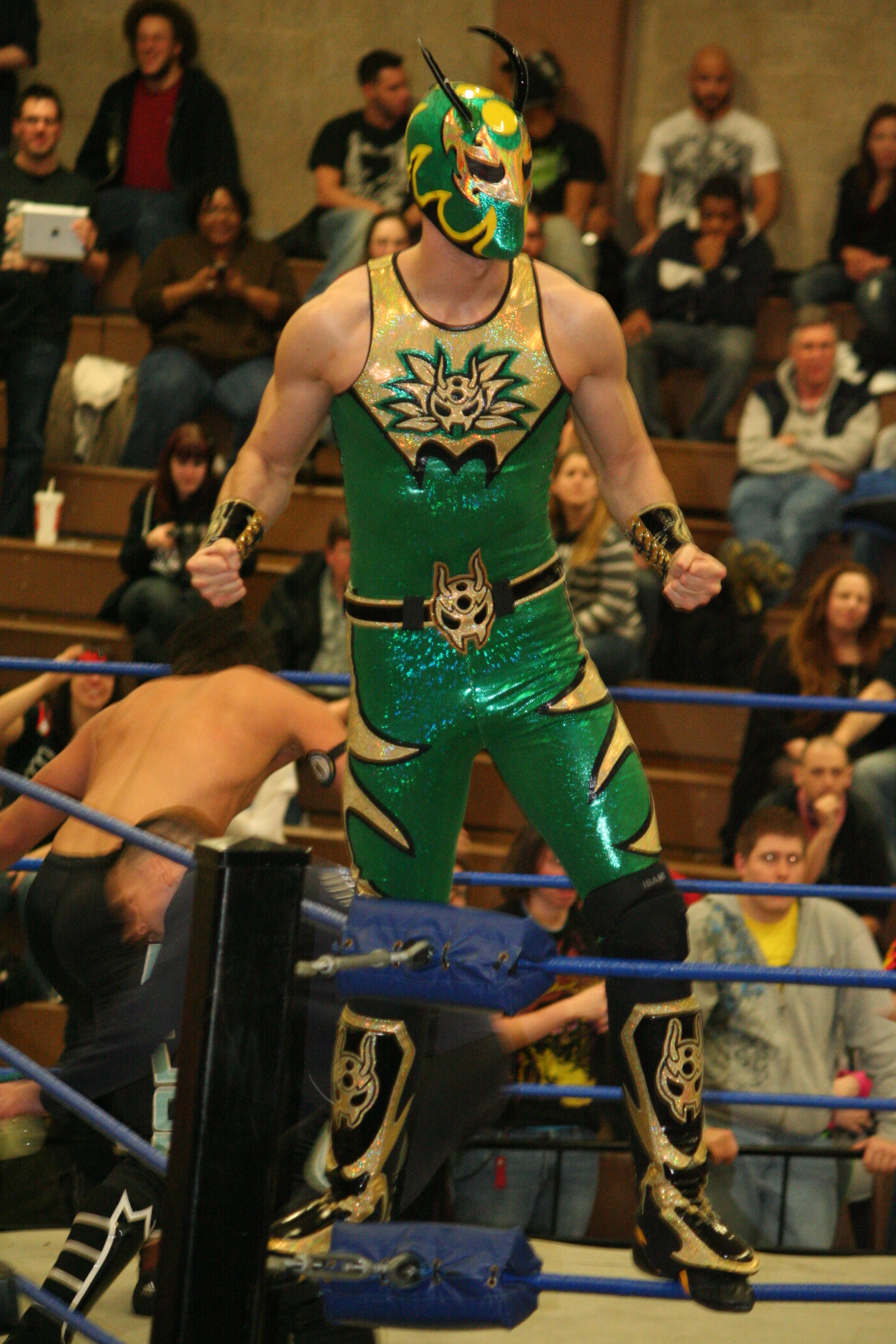
Green Ant in 2012

Fire Ant and Soldier Ant acquired two more points over the next few months and challenged the Osirian Portal for the Campeonatos de Parejas again on September 13 at Hiding in Plain Sight. This time around, the Colony was victorious, winning the title in two straight falls.

On October 18, Fire Ant and Soldier Ant captained their own teams for the annual torneo cibernetico. Green Ant and Carpenter Ant were brought into the mix, with Green Ant going on Fire's team while Carpenter went on Soldier's team. Soldier and Carpenter Ant ended up as the final two in the match, and Carpenter defeated his fellow Ant via submission after debuting the Inverted Chikara Special to win the cibernetico. On November 22, 2009, at Three-Fisted Tales, Carpenter Ant became a rudo and unmasked to reveal himself as Pinkie Sanchez, while also joining the Bruderschaft des Kreuzes (BDK). In a blog entry on the promotion's official website, Sanchez explained his decision to appear as Carpenter Ant was done after failing to secure a spot in Chikara and then seeing how easy it was for Green Ant to debut and be immediately accepted into the Chikara locker room. During the break between seasons eight and nine, Sanchez adopted the nickname "Pink Ant" and began wearing a pink and white ant mask, while also declaring a war on The Colony.

On March 20, 2010, at Wit, Verve, and a Bit o' Nerve, The Colony lost the Campeonatos de Parejas to Ares and Claudio Castagnoli of the BDK after BDK members Pinkie Sanchez, Lince Dorado and Tursas attacked them before the match and Tursas powerbombed Soldier Ant against a wall, rendering him unconscious for most of the match.

==== King of Trios (2010–2011) ====
On April 23 The Colony entered the 2010 King of Trios tournament. After defeating the team of Flip Kendrick, Louis Lyndon and Johnny Gargano, The Colony handed BDK their first non-disqualification loss when they defeated the trio of Pinkie Sanchez, Tim Donst and Lince Dorado in the quarterfinals of the tournament. On April 25 The Colony defeated Team Osaka Pro (Atsushi Kotoge, Daisuke Harada and Tadasuke) to make their way to the finals of the tournament, where they were defeated by the BDK trio of Ares, Castagnoli and Tursas, when referee Derek Sabato turned rudo, revealed himself as being aligned with BDK and performed a fast count to end the match. On August 29, Green Ant broke his arm during a match with Keita Yano and upon his return in February 2011, Chikara started a storyline similar to that used by the World Wrestling Federation with Lex Luger in 1993, where it was claimed that Green Ant had a metal plate inserted into his arm, which resulted in strikes from that elbow being more powerful due to the plate. Also in February, The Colony of Fire Ant and Soldier Ant secured three points and challenged Mike Quackenbush and Jigsaw for the Campeonatos de Parejas on March 13, but were unsuccessful in regaining the title. On April 15, The Colony entered the 2011 King of Trios, defeating Sinn Bodhi, Kodama and Obariyon in their first round match. The following day during a fan conclave, Chikara held a contest to see if anyone could be able to body slam the 375 lb (170 kg) BDK member Tursas. Green Ant entered the contest, once again copying a storyline the WWF had used with Lex Luger and Yokozuna in 1993, but before he could complete the body slam, he was tripped by BDK member Jakob Hammermeier. Later that day, The Colony advanced to the semifinals of the 2011 King of Trios by defeating BDK representatives Tim Donst, Delirious and Hammermeier, after Green Ant body slammed the interfering Tursas and then submitted Hammermeier with Luger's trademark finisher, the Torture Rack. The following day, The Colony defeated The Osirian Portal (Amasis, Hieracon and Ophidian) to advance to their second King of Trios final in a row. Later that same day, The Colony defeated F.I.S.T. (Chuck Taylor, Icarus and Johnny Gargano) in the finals to win the 2011 King of Trios. In July, Green Ant started a "Flex Express" bus tour that was featured on Chikara's video podcasts, in preparation for his singles match with Tursas, again imitating a similar tour Luger had done in 1993. One of the episodes even featured a cameo from Luger himself. The match took place on July 30 and saw Tursas defeat Green Ant following interference from Jakob Hammermeier. On August 27, Green Ant advanced to the finals of the ninth annual Young Lions Cup tournament, before losing to Osaka Pro Wrestling representative Tadasuke. The following month, Fire Ant and Green Ant made their first tour of Osaka Pro, which culminated on September 23 in a match, where they unsuccessfully challenged Atsushi Kotoge and Daisuke Harada for the Osaka Pro Wrestling Tag Team Championship. On November 13 at Chikara's first internet pay-per-view, High Noon, Fire Ant and Soldier Ant defeated The Young Bucks to once again earn the right to challenge for the Campeonatos de Parejas, while Green Ant ended his feud with Tursas by defeating him in a grudge match with a new submission maneuver, the Chikara Special: Green. The Colony cashed in their points on December 2, during Chikara's special post-season JoshiMania weekend, but were defeated by the defending Campeones de Parejas, F.I.S.T. (Chuck Taylor and Johnny Gargano).

==== The Swarm and Xtreme Force (2012–2014) ====
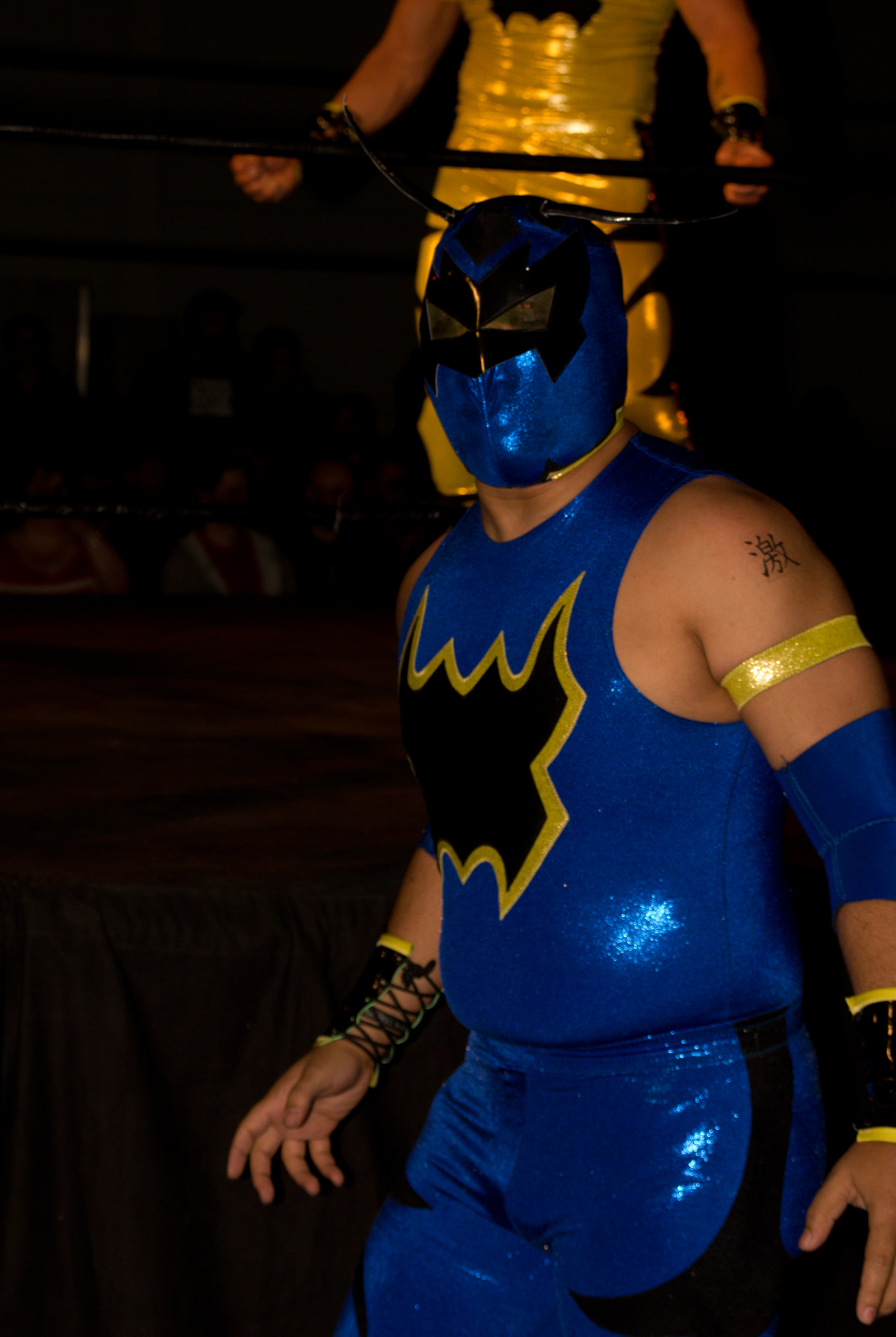
assailAnt, who joined The Colony in late 2012 and later became the second Worker Ant in 2014

In 2012, the Colony, along with several other top Chikara wrestlers, started feuding with the Gekido stable, focusing specifically on the masked trio of assailAnt, deviAnt and combatAnt, also known as the Swarm. For the 2012 King of Trios, Chikara's Director of Fun Wink Vavasseur mixed members of the Colony with members of the Swarm against their wishes, with Soldier Ant being forced to team with combatAnt and deviAnt as the Swarm, and Fire Ant and Green Ant being forced to team with assailAnt as the Colony. Following these changes, both teams were eliminated from the tournament in the first round on September 14, with the Colony losing to Team Sendai Girls (Dash Chisako, Meiko Satomura and Sendai Sachiko) and the Swarm to Jigsaw, Mike Quackenbush and Manami Toyota. The two mixed Colony and Swarm trios were also forced to remain together after the tournament. The Colony's involvement in the feud with Gekido culminated when Quackenbush injured combatAnt to the point of forcing him to retire, leaving the Swarm to consist of only deviAnt and Soldier Ant. Finally, on December 2 at Under the Hood, assailAnt transitioned into being a tecnico and became a full-fledged member of the Colony. The new Colony then departed together, leaving Soldier Ant alone at ringside.

With the Swarm effectively finished due to Gekido being ousted from Chikara, as well as continued dissension between deviAnt and Soldier Ant, Wink Vavasseur debuted three new Ants on March 8, 2013: Arctic Rescue Ant, Missile Assault Ant and Orbit Adventure Ant. Vavasseur installed Soldier Ant as the leader of this new group, collectively known as The Colony: Xtreme Force, who immediately started a rivalry with the original Colony. The rivalry also saw Vavasseur strip The Colony of their King of Trios medals and award them to The Colony: Xtreme Force. After mixed success with the new Ants throughout March, Soldier Ant ultimately ended his affiliation with the Colony: Xtreme Force by (kayfabe) quitting Chikara after they defeated the Colony on April 29 at the event The Shoulder of Pallas. When Chikara went inactive following June 2013's Aniversario: Never Compromise, The Colony came together with other Chikara wrestlers to battle a united group of rudos from the promotion's past, including both Gekido and The Colony: Xtreme Force, who were trying to permanently kill off Chikara. The storyline culminated on February 1, 2014, during the second National Pro Wrestling Day in a face-off between the two groups. During the face-off, assailAnt received an invitation to join the rudo group, but chose to remain with Chikara and the Colony in the ensuing battle, which the Chikara roster won, leading to the promotion announcing its return. During the promotion's inactivity, it was revealed via The Ashes of Chikara YouTube series that Green Ant and Fire Ant still found it difficult to trust assailAnt, due to his previous association with Gekido and attempted to find Soldier Ant, but were unsuccessful. Meanwhile, assailAnt proved his loyalty by refusing deviAnt's orders to burn down the Wrestle Factory and not crossing the line at National pro Wrestling Day. After the event, Green Ant discovered that assailAnt's change of heart came from being a father and not wanting his own son to see his father as a bitter and resentful man. Now convinced and fully trusting their former enemy, Green Ant and assailAnt reconciled and Green Ant passed the mantle of Worker Ant to him—which the original intended to be for Green Ant.

==== Feud with The Flood (2014–2015) ====
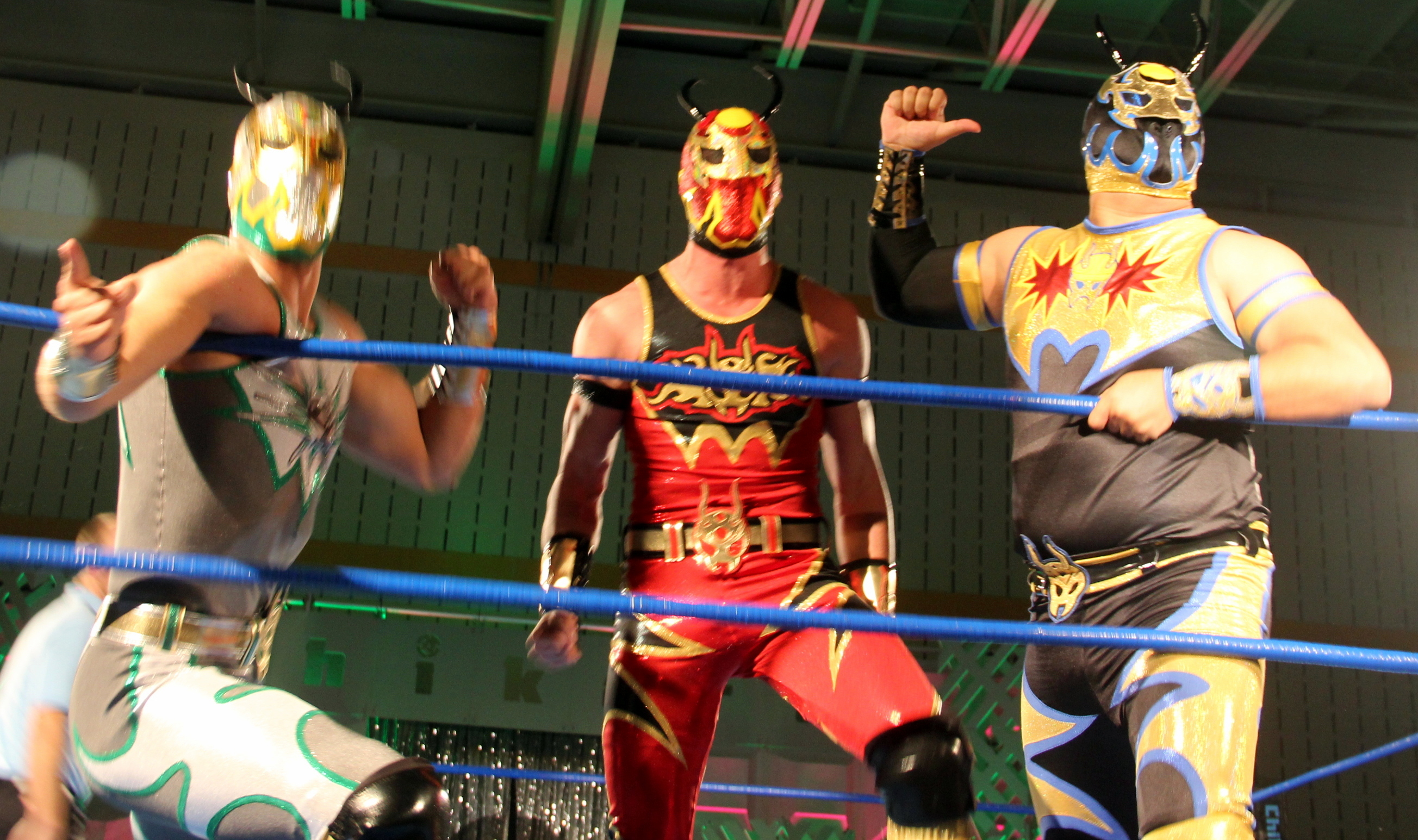
From left to right: Silver Ant, Fire Ant, and Worker Ant (II) during the 2014 King of Trios in September 2014

At Chikara's return event, You Only Live Twice on May 25, the newly christened Worker Ant, Fire Ant and Green Ant were defeated in a six-man tag team match by The Colony: Xtreme Force, though they were successful in retrieving the King of Trios medals. The event concluded in an angle where Soldier Ant, now sporting a new tattered look, returned as a rudo and attacked his former stablemates, despite pleads from Fire Ant, before subsequently joining The Flood. At the same event, Green Ant debuted a new silver look and on June 3, he was confirmed to have changed his name to Silver Ant. On September 19, The Colony defeated The Colony: Xtreme Force in the first round of the 2014 King of Trios. They were, however, eliminated from the tournament the following day by Flood representatives Eddie Kingston, Jimmy Jacobs and Volgar following outside interference from Soldier Ant and Deucalion. On December 6 at Tomorrow Never Dies, the Ants faced off in the annual torneo cibernetico with Fire Ant, Silver Ant and Worker Ant representing Chikara and Soldier Ant representing The Flood. In the end, Soldier Ant picked up the win by pinning Fire Ant. The rivalry between Soldier Ant and his former Colony stablemates concluded a year later at Top Banana, the season 15 finale on December 5, 2015, where he and Fire Ant faced off in a singles match. Towards the end of the match, Soldier Ant's BDK stablemate Jakob Hammermeier went to punch the referee of the match, but accidentally hit Soldier Ant instead, effectively breaking his reprogramming by Deucalion. Remembering his true self, Soldier Ant then saluted each member of The Colony and officially rejoined the faction upon embracing them and having his King of Trios medal returned to him.

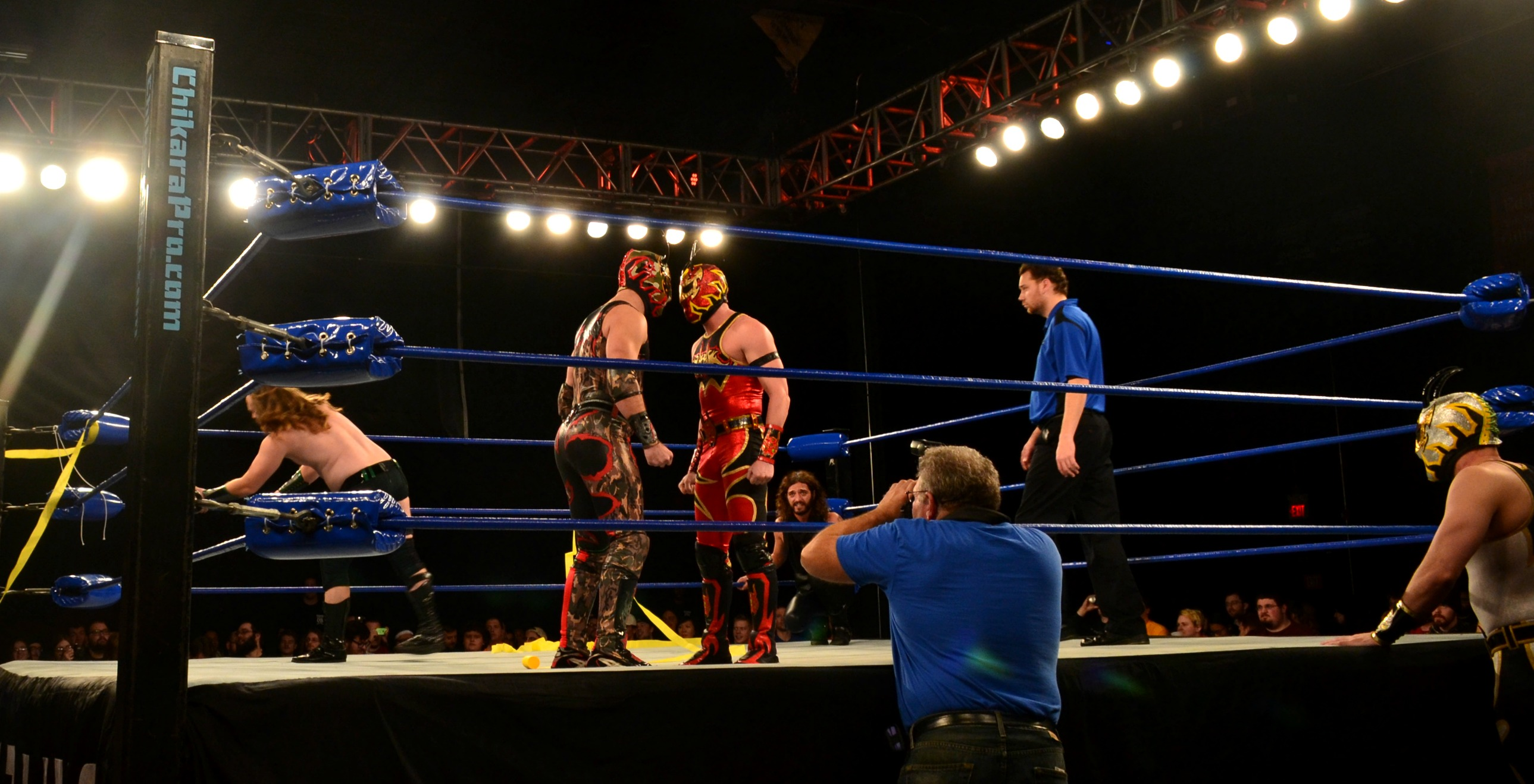
Soldier Ant (left) wrestling Fire Ant at CHIKARA's Top Banana – December 5, 2015

==== Various storylines (2016–2018) ====
On December 3, 2016, it was announced that Soldier Ant would be forced to retire "due to injuries suffered in the war with Nazmaldun". During 2017, Silver Ant also left Chikara, leaving Fire Ant as the lone Ant left in the promotion. In 2018, Fire Ant descended into madness when he realizes that Ophidian (who was disguised as 17 in 2014) had inadvertently caused The Colony to collapse after saving Frightmare (who was a tecnico at the time) from being killed by Deucalion, which would lead to Hallowicked & Frightmare to be possessed by the Eye of Tyr, and Frightmare destroying the other 3 ants. During 2018, two new ants debuted: Thief Ant, and a second Green Ant. Initially, Fire Ant had issues with the two new ants, saying that they were "not The Colony", until King Of Trios 2018, where they would win the entire tournament.

== Championships and accomplishments ==
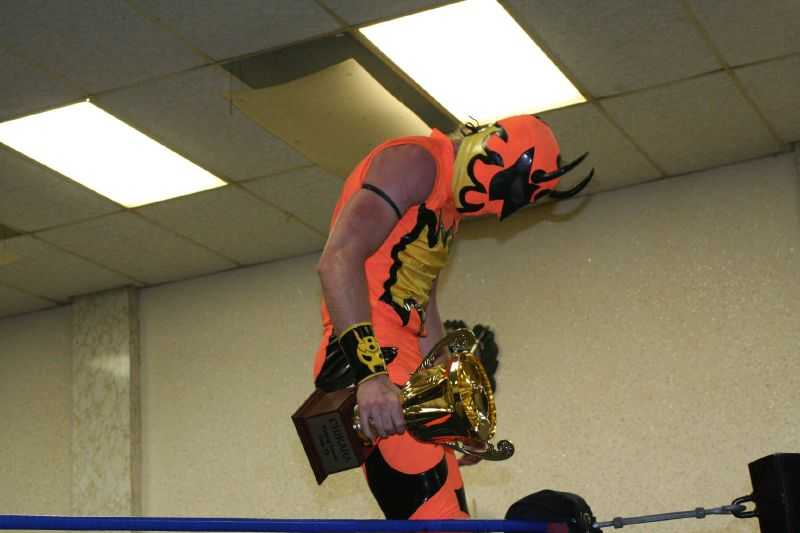
Fire Ant with the Young Lions Cup

- Chikara

- Campeonatos de Parejas (1 time) – Fire Ant and Soldier Ant
- Young Lions Cup VI (1 time) – Fire Ant
- King of Trios (2011) – Fire Ant, Green Ant, and Soldier Ant
- King of Trios (2018) – Fire Ant, Green Ant (II), and Thief Ant
- Tag World Grand Prix (2008) – Fire Ant and Soldier Ant
- Torneo Cibernetico (2009) – Carpenter Ant
- Torneo Cibernetico (2014) - Soldier Ant

- Chilanga Mask

- Torneo de Parejas (2015) – Silver Ant and Ophidian

- Eastern Townships Wrestling Association
  - ETWA Tag Team Championship (1 time, current) - Electro Ant and Ultimo Ant
- Forza Lucha!

- Forza Lucha Cup (2014) – Fire Ant

- Wrestling is Fun!

- WiF! 24/7 Championship (1 time) – Green Ant
- WiF! Banana Championship (1 time) – assailAnt

=== Luchas de Apuestas record ===
Winner (wager)	Loser (wager)	Location	Event	Date	Notes
Fire Ant and Soldier Ant (masks)	Chuck Taylor and Icarus (hair)	Philadelphia, Pennsylvania	Aniversario Yang	May 24, 2009	
