= Tag World Grand Prix =

The Tag World Grand Prix was a professional wrestling tag team tournament promoted by the Chikara and Wrestling is Fun! (WiF!) wrestling promotions.

== 2003 ==
Tag World Grand Prix 2003 was the first Tag World Grand Prix tournament held by Chikara. The tournament ran over two nights, with the preliminary rounds being held on July 5, 2003, at St. John's Auditorium in Allentown, Pennsylvania, and the finals held three weeks later on July 26 at the same venue. Twelve teams entered the tournament with the finals being scheduled in a three-way dance format.

Teams

- American Gigolo and Jolly Roger
- Conundrum (Jigsaw and Rorschach)
- The Nightshift (Blind Rage and Hallowicked)
- The Senior Assault Team (Lester Crabtree and Melvin Snodgrass)
- The SuperFriends (Chris Hero and Mike Quackenbush)
- Swiss Money Holding (Ares and Claudio Castagnoli)
- Team F.I.S.T. (Gran Akuma and Icarus)
- Team IWA: Mid-South (Brad Bradley and Jimmy Jacobs)
- Team Kiryoku Pro (Mercedes Martinez and Sumie Sakai)
- Team Toryumon (Arakencito and Skayde)
- Ultra/ZERO (Mister ZERO and UltraMantis)
- The Wild Cards (BlackJack Marciano and Eddie Kingston)

Tournament brackets

First round
The Nightshift	Pin
Team IWA-MS	08:07
F.I.S.T.	Pin
Conundrum	09:28

Semifinals
The Nightshift	Pin
F.I.S.T.	09:29

First round
Ultra/ZERO	Pin
Gigolo/Roger	07:36
The Wild Cards	Pin
Team Kiryoku Pro	11:36

Semifinals
Ultra/ZERO	Pin
The Wild Cards	12:31

First round
The SuperFriends*	Sub
Team Toryumon*	15:15
Swi$$ Money Holding	Pin
The Senior Assault Team	00:22

Semifinals
The SuperFriends†	Draw
Swis$$ Money Holding†	30:00

- * Due to the height difference between the competitors, the rules of the match were changed so that Arakencito only required a two count to win the match, while Hero and Quackenbush had to score a four count in order to pin him
- † As a result of the time limit draw, both teams were eliminated from the tournament

Finals

- The Nightshift defeated Ultra/ZERO via pinfall

== 2005 ==
Tag World Grand Prix 2005 ran over three nights, from February 18 through 20, 2005. The first and second rounds took place over the first two nights in Reading, Pennsylvania, and Emmaus, Pennsylvania, respectively. The remainder occurred on the third night in Pittston, Pennsylvania. This time the number of participating teams was expanded to 32. BlackJack Marciano was scheduled to enter the tournament as Eddie Kingston's partner, but had to pull out due to an injury. His replacement was decided by a random draw.

Teams

- AC/DC (Arik Cannon and Claudio Castagnoli)
- All Money Is Legal (K-Murda and Kid Pusha)
- BJ and The Bear (The Bear and Beef Wellington)
- CKNY (Cory Kastle and Niles Young)
- The Dark Breed (Blind Rage and Hallowicked)
- Deathmatch Kings (Mad Man Pondo and Necro Butcher)
- Eddie Kingston and Mickie Knuckles
- Eye Candy (D. J. Skittlez and Private Eye)
- Jigsaw and Sabian
- Knight Eye for the Pirate Guy (Jolly Roger and Lance Steel)
- Men@Work (Mister ZERO and Shane Storm)
- Mystery Team (Glenn Spectre and Mokujin Ken)
- Perfect Strangers (Emil Sitoci and Trik Davis)
- Ravage and Rorschach
- The Ring Crew Express (Dunn and Marcos)
- ROH Students (Anthony Franco and Matt Turner)
- ROH Students (Davey Andrews and Shane Hagadorn)
- The SuperFriends (Chris Hero and Mike Quackenbush)
- Sweet n' Sour International (1) (Larry Sweeney and ShareCropper)
- Sweet n' Sour International (2) (Crossbones and Mano Metalico)
- Team Big Daddy (Darkness Crabtree and Shirley Doe)
- Team CZW (D. J. Hyde and Jon Dahmer)
- Team F.I.S.T. (Icarus & Gran Akuma)
- Team IWA: Mid-South (Danny Daniels and Jimmy Jacobs)
- Team IWA: Reading (Din Mak and Mat Bomboy)
- Team IWS (El Generico and Kevin Steen)
- Team MPW (Darin Corbin and Version 2.0)
- Team Osaka Pro (Billyken Kid and Ebessan)
- Team PWG (B-Boy and Super Dragon)
- Team Toryumon X (Milanito Collection a.t. and Skayde)
- Team WXW (John Cabbie and Mana)
- You Can Call Me Al (Alere Little Feather and Allison Danger)

Tournament brackets

First round
AC/DC	Pin
You Can Call Me Al	08:37
F.I.S.T.	Pin
Team WXW	06:51
Knight Eye for the Pirate Guy	Pin
Sweet n' Sour Int. (2)	10:21
Team IWA-MS	Pin
Team IWA Reading	08:18
Jigsaw/Sabian	Sub
Ravage/Rorschach	10:06
Ring Crew Express	Pin
Andrews/Hagadorn	10:57
Deathmatch Kings	Pin
Franco/Turner	09:04
Men@Work	Pin
Sweet n' Sour Int. (1)	13:50
Team Osaka Pro	Pin
Big Daddy	07:39
Team PWG	Pin
Mystery Team	03:47
Team Toryumon X	Pin
Perfect Strangers	10:36
BJ and The Bear	Sub
Team MPW	07:44
SuperFriends	Sub
Kingston/Knuckles	22:36
Dark Breed	Pin
Eye Candy	08:53
Team IWS	Pin
All Money Is Legal	10:52
Team CZW	Pin
CKNY	09:04

Second Round
AC/DC	Pin
F.I.S.T.	12:07
Knight Eye for the Pirate Guy	Sub
Team IWA-MS	10:55
Jigsaw/Sabian	Pin
Ring Crew Express	09:58
Deathmatch Kings	Sub
Men@Work	09:47
Team Osaka Pro	Pin
Team PWG	18:57
Toryumon X	Sub
BJ and The Bear	07:31
SuperFriends	Pin
Dark Breed	17:50
Team IWS	Pin
Team CZW	14:22

Quarterfinals
AC/DC	Pin
Knight Eye for the Pirate Guy	18:49
Jigsaw/Sabian	DQ
Deathmatch Kings	09:08
Team Osaka Pro	Pin
Team Toryumon X	13:02
SuperFriends	Pin
Team IWS	16:44

Semifinals
AC/DC	Pin
Jigsaw/Sabian	05:12
SuperFriends	Pin
Team Osaka Pro	25:00

Finals
AC/DC	Pin
SuperFriends	26:40

== 2006 ==
Tag World Grand Prix 2006 was the third Tag World Grand Prix tournament and ran over three nights, from February 24 through 26, 2006, and crowned Chikara's first-ever Campeones de Parejas (Tag Team Champions). The first and second rounds took place over the first two nights at the American Legion Hall in Hellertown, Pennsylvania, and The Riverside in Reading, Pennsylvania, respectively. The remainder occurred on the third night at the New Alhambra Arena in Philadelphia, Pennsylvania. Like the previous year, 32 teams entered the tournament. The teams of The Dark Breed (Hallowicked and UltraMantis Black) and Angel de Fuego and Equinox were scheduled to enter the tournament, however, UltraMantis Black had to pull out due to an injury, while Angel de Fuego no-showed the event. Their replacements were decided by a random draw.

Teams

- Arik Cannon and Jigsaw
- Cheech and Cloudy
- Crossbones and Rorschach
- Delirious and Hallowicked
- Larry Sweeney and Mana
- Equinox and Hydra
- 2.0 (Jagged and Shane Matthews)
- BLKOUT (Eddie Kingston and Sabian)
- The Colony (Fire Ant and Soldier Ant)
- The Gambino Bros. Moving Company (Marshall Gambino and Mickey Gambino)
- The Heartbreak Express (Phil Davis and Sean Davis)
- The Iron Saints (Sal Thomaselli and Vito Thomaselli)
- The Kings of Wrestling (Chris Hero and Claudio Castagnoli)
- Lancelot (Lance Steel and Lance Steel)
- Men@Work (Mister ZERO and Shane Storm)
- The North Star Express (Darin Corbin and Ryan Cruz)
- Notorious Inc. (Devon Moore and Drew Blood)
- The Prescription Thugs (Darkness Crabtree and Dr. Cheung)
- Team DDT (KUDO and MIKAMI)
- Team DragonDoor (Milano Collection A.T. and Skayde)
- Team F.I.S.T. (Icarus and Gran Akuma)
- Team IWA Mid-South (Ian Rotten and Mickie Knuckles)
- Team IWS (Kevin Steen and SeXXXy Eddy)
- Team Jd'Star (Ranmaru and Sumie Sakai)
- Team K-Dojo (MIYAWAKI and Yoshiaki Yago)
- Team MUGA (Katsushi Takemura and Osamu Nishimura)
- Team Ring of Honor (Anthony Franco and Matt Turner)
- Team SHIMMER (Daizee Haze and Rain)
- Team Toryumon (Amigo Suzuki and Shinjitsu Nohashi)
- Team WWF (CP Munk and Colt Cabunny)
- Team You Can Call Me Al (Alere Little Feather and Allison Danger)
- Triple Dragon (Dragon Dragon and Retail Dragon)

Tournament brackets

First round
Kings of Wrestling	Pin
Equinox/Hydra	14:55
Team Jd'Star	Pin
You Can Call Me Al	08:02
North Star Express	Pin
Notorious Inc.	06:51
Lancelot	Sub
The Colony	10:13
Incoherence	Pin
Crossbones/Rorschach	09:26
Cheech/Cloudy	Pin
Gambino Bros.	09:10
Team DDT	Pin
Sweeney/Mana	06:02
Team K-Dojo	Sub
The Iron Saints	10:33
DragonDoor	Sub
Prescription Thugs	05:31
Team Toryumon	Pin
Triple Dragon	07:46
Team MUGA	Pin
Heartbreak Express	06:04
Cannon/Jigsaw	Pin
Team IWS	16:05
F.I.S.T.	Sub
Team SHIMMER	09:41
Men@Work	Pin
2.0	07:41
BLKOUT	Pin
Team IWA-MS	15:09
Team WWF	Pin
Team ROH	05:34

Second Round
Kings of Wrestling	Pin
Team Jd'Star	14:17
North Star Express	Pin
Lancelot	07:54
Incoherence	Pin
Cheech/Cloudy	12:15
Team DDT	Pin
Team K-Dojo	17:21
DragonDoor	Pin
Team Toryumon	19:59
Team MUGA	Sub
Cannon/Jigsaw	15:27
F.I.S.T.	Pin
Men@Work	15:34
BLKOUT	Pin
Team WWF	14:01

Quarterfinals
Kings of Wrestling	Pin
North Star Express	12:44
Incoherence	Pin
Team DDT	08:50
DragonDoor	Pin
Team MUGA	11:15
F.I.S.T.	Pin
BLKOUT	13:23

Semifinals
Kings of Wrestling	Pin
Incoherence	18:42
DragonDoor	Sub
F.I.S.T.	08:10

Finals
Kings of Wrestling	Pin
DragonDoor	17:34

== 2008 ==
Tag World Grand Prix 2008 was the fourth Tag World Grand Prix tournament held by Chikara. The tournament ran over two nights, November 8 and 9 and was held in Oberhausen, Germany. This time only 12 teams entered the tournament, with the finals being scheduled to be contested under three-way elimination match rules. The team of Tommy End and Zack Sabre Jr. was scheduled to enter the tournament, however, Sabre Jr. no-showed the event and his replacement was decided by a random draw.

Teams

- 2.0 (Jagged and Shane Matthews)
- Andrew Patterson and Tommy End
- The Colony (Fire Ant and Soldier Ant)
- Fight Club (Kid Fite and Lionheart)
- Johnny Kidd and Robbie Brookside
- Martin Stone and PAC
- The Osirian Portal (Amasis and Ophidian)
- Revolution Purple (Adam Polak and Lazio Fe)
- Swi$$ Money Holding (Claudio Castagnoli and Marc Roudin)
- Team F.I.S.T (Icarus and Chuck Taylor)
- The Thrillers (Wade Fitzgerald and Joel Redman)
- The UnStable (Vin Gerard and STIGMA)

Tournament brackets

First round
The Colony	Pin
Fight Club	12:28
The UnStable	Pin
Swi$$ Money Holding	09:44

Semifinals
The Colony	Pin
The UnStable	14:08

First round
The Osirian Portal	Pin
The Thrillers	12:08
Patterson/End	Pin
2.0	10:52

Semifinals
The Osirian Portal	Pin
Patterson/End	13:49

First round
Stone/PAC	Pin
F.I.S.T.	13:55
Revolution Purple	Pin
Kidd/Brookside	10:35

Semifinals
Stone/PAC	Pin
Revolution Purple	08:58

Finals

- The Colony defeated The Osirian Portal and Martin Stone and PAC in a three-way elimination match
  - The Osirian Portal eliminated Stone/PAC via pinfall (04:49)
  - The Colony defeated The Osirian Portal via submission (25:00)

== 2013 ==
On March 8, 2013, Chikara announced that the first Tag World Grand Prix in four and a half years would be taking place on May 18 in Chicago, Illinois. Chikara later revealed on their website that the tournament would be contested over two shows, both taking place on May 18. The Heart Throbs (Antonio Thomas and Romeo Roselli) were originally announced for the tournament, but were on the day of the tournament replaced by Submission Squad (Gary Jay and Pierre Abernathy).

Teams

- AC/DC (Arik Cannon and Darin Corbin)
- The Baltic Siege (Estonian ThunderFrog and Latvian Proud Oak)
- The Batiri (Kodama and Obariyon)
- Bravado Brothers (Harlem Bravado and Lancelot Bravado)
- The Colony (Fire Ant and Green Ant)
- The Colony: Xtreme Force (deviAnt and Orbit Adventure Ant)
- Da Soul Touchaz (Acid Jaz and Marshe Rockett)
- The Day Walkers (Alexandre Barnabus Castle and Mathias Cage)
- The Devastation Corporation (Blaster McMassive and Max Smashmaster)
- Heidi Lovelace and Saturyne
- Los Ice Creams: Xtreme Frost (El Hijo del Ice Cream and Ice Cream Jr.)
- Pieces of Hate (Jigsaw and The Shard)
- The Spectral Envoy (Frightmare and Hallowicked)
- Submission Squad (Gary the Barn Owl and Pierre Abernathy)
- The Young Bucks (Matt Jackson and Nick Jackson)
- Zero Gravity (Brett Gakiya and CJ Esparza)

Tournament brackets

First round
The Baltic Siege	Pin
The Young Bucks	9:11
The Spectral Envoy	DQ
The Colony: Xtreme Force	7:55
Bravado Brothers	Pin
The Batiri	11:30
Zero Gravity	Pin
The Day Walkers	6:59
The Colony	Pin
Los Ice Creams: Xtreme Frost	16:44
Submission Squad	Pin
The Devastation Corporation	1:01
Lovelace/Saturyne	Pin
AC/DC	10:33
Da Soul Touchaz	Sub
Pieces of Hate	14:02

Second round
The Young Bucks	Pin
The Spectral Envoy
The Batiri	Pin
The Day Walkers
The Colony	DCO
The Devastation Corporation
AC/DC	Pin
Pieces of Hate

Semifinals
The Young Bucks	Pin
The Batiri
Bye
Pieces of Hate

Finals
The Young Bucks	Sub
Pieces of Hate

== 2014 ==
The 2014 Tag World Grand Prix was held by Chikara's sister promotion Wrestling is Fun! (WiF!) between April 5 and May 24. The upper half of the tournament bracket, including both first round and quarterfinal matches, was held on April 5 in Easton, Pennsylvania, and the lower half on May 3 in Norristown, Pennsylvania. The semifinals and finals were held on May 24 in Easton. The winners of the tournament would get to take part in Chikara's You Only Live Twice internet pay-per-view (iPPV) on May 25.

Teams

- 3.0 (Scott Parker and Shane Matthews)
- The Baltic Siege (Estonian ThunderFrog and Latvian Snow Troll)
- The Batiri (Kodama and Obariyon)
- The Bloc Party (Mr. Azerbaijan and Proletariat Boar of Moldova)
- The Colony: Xtreme Force (Arctic Rescue Ant and Missile Assault Ant)
- The Devastation Corporation (Blaster McMassive and Max Smashmaster)
- Haack N Slaash (Haack and Slaash)
- The Heart Throbs (Antonio Thomas and Romeo Roselli)
- Los Ice Creams (El Hijo del Ice Cream and Ice Cream Jr.)
- Knight Eye for the Pirate Guy (Jolly Roger and Lance Steel)
- Old Fashioned (Jervis Cottonbelly and Marion Fontaine)
- The Osirian Portal (Amasis and Ophidian)
- Sidney Bakabella's Wrecking Crew (Jaka and Oleg the Usurper)
- The Spectral Envoy (Frightmare and Hallowicked)
- Team Benchmark (Bill Daly and Will Ferrara)
- The Throwbacks (Dasher Hatfield and Mark Angelosetti)

Tournament brackets

First round
The Spectral Envoy	Pin
The Devastation Corporation
The Batiri	Pin
Old Fashioned
The Heart Throbs	Sub
3.0
The Osirian Portal	Pin
The Colony: Xtreme Force
The Throwbacks	Pin
Haack N Slaash
Team Benchmark	Pin
Los Ice Creams
KE4TPG	Pin
The Bloc Party
The Baltic Siege	Pin
Wrecking Crew

Quarterfinals
The Devastation Corporation	Pin
The Batiri
3.0	Pin
The Osirian Portal
The Throwbacks	Pin
Team Benchmark
KE4TPG	Pin
Wrecking Crew

Semifinals
The Devastation Corporation	Pin
The Osirian Portal
The Throwbacks
KE4TPG

Finals
The Devastation Corporation	Pin
The Throwbacks

== 2016 ==
Tag World Grand Prix 2016 took place over two shows on April 2 in Philadelphia, Pennsylvania; first round matches were held at Phone Home (afternoon show) and the semifinals and the final match at Disk (evening show). Hermit Crab and Rock Lobster were scheduled to wrestle in the tournament, but due to an injury, they were replaced by Le Tabarnak de Team (Mathieu St-Jacques and Thomas Dubois).

Teams

- The Colony (Fire Ant and Worker Ant)
- Devastation Corporation (Blaster McMassive and Flex Rumblecrunch)
- Los Ice Creams (El Hijo del Ice Cream and Ice Cream, Jr.)
- The Osirian Portal (Amasis and Ophidian)
- Punk Rock All-Stars (Drake Carter and Shaun Cannon)
- The Sea Stars (Ashley Vox and Delmi Exo)
- Le Tabarnak de Team (Mathieu St-Jacques and Thomas Dubois)
- The United Nations (Juan Francisco de Coronado and Prakash Sabar)

First round
The Colony
The United Nations
Los Ice Creams
Team Sea Stars
The Devastation Corporation
Punk Rock All-Stars
The Osirian Portal
Le Tabarnak de Team

Semifinals
The Colony
Los Ice Creams
The Devastation Corporation
The Osirian Portal

Final
The Colony
The Devastation Corporation
