= La Lotería Letal =

Professional wrestling tournament

La Lotería Letal (English: The Lethal Lottery) is a tag team tournament that was held in 2008 and 2018 by professional wrestling promotion Chikara. It consisted of eight teams, who competed in a single-elimination tournament.

== Background ==
To determine the participants in the tournament, eighteen of Chikara's wrestlers were selected to participate. The tournament included several well-known wrestlers, including Colin Delaney, who gained fame on World Wrestling Entertainment's Extreme Championship Wrestling brand, and longtime independent circuit veteran Mike Quackenbush. Other participants included Chikara regulars and other independent wrestlers. Sixteen names were drawn at random to form tag teams and determine the match pairings. The two remaining wrestlers, Hydra and Brodie Lee, faced each other in a singles match at the September 6 event. The format was similar to that used in World Championship Wrestling's Lethal Lottery tournaments, which also involved random pairings of wrestlers.

== Event ==
The first two rounds were held at the Palmer Center in Easton, Pennsylvania on September 6, 2008.

The singles match took place between the first and second rounds of the tournament, and Lee defeated Hydra. The team of Jimmy Olsen and Lince Dorado and the team of Vin Gerard and Colin Delaney faced each other in the final match, which was held on October 18, also at the Palmer Center. Olsen and Delaney competing against each other was significant, as they had competed as kayfabe twin brothers, The Olsen Twins, early in their careers. Olsen and Dorado won the tournament; as a result, they were awarded three points in Chikara's tag team division. In the division, teams must accumulate three points before they are permitted to challenge for the Chikara Campeonatos de Parejas, the promotion's tag team championship.

The shows at which the tournament matches took place were recorded and have been released separately on DVD through Smart Mark Video.

== Challenge for tag team championship ==
Olsen, competing under the ring name Equinox, and Dorado, challenged tag team champions The Osirian Portal at Chikara's "Armdrags to Riches" event on November 16, 2008. In a two out of three falls match, Dorado gained the first pinfall. The Osirian Portal won the match, however, after pinning Dorado and then Equinox to retain the title belts.

== Tournament bracket ==
First Round (September 6)
Icarus and Ultimo Breakfast	Pin
Helios and Tim Donst	09:24
Jimmy Olsen and Lince Dorado	Sub
Shane Storm and Eddie Kingston	07:06
Vin Gerard and Colin Delaney	Sub
Halcon Guerrero and Mitch Ryder	10:07
Claudio Castagnoli and Larry Sweeney	Pin
Mike Quackenbush and Pinkie Sanchez	12:41

Semifinals (September 6)
Icarus and Ultimo Breakfast	Pin
Jimmy Olsen and Lince Dorado	08:28
Vin Gerard and Colin Delaney	Pin
Mike Quackenbush/Pinkie Sanchez	08:53

Finals (October 18)
Jimmy Olsen and Lince Dorado	Pin
Vin Gerard and Colin Delaney	16:26
