= Ares (wrestler) =

Swiss professional wrestler and wrestling trainer

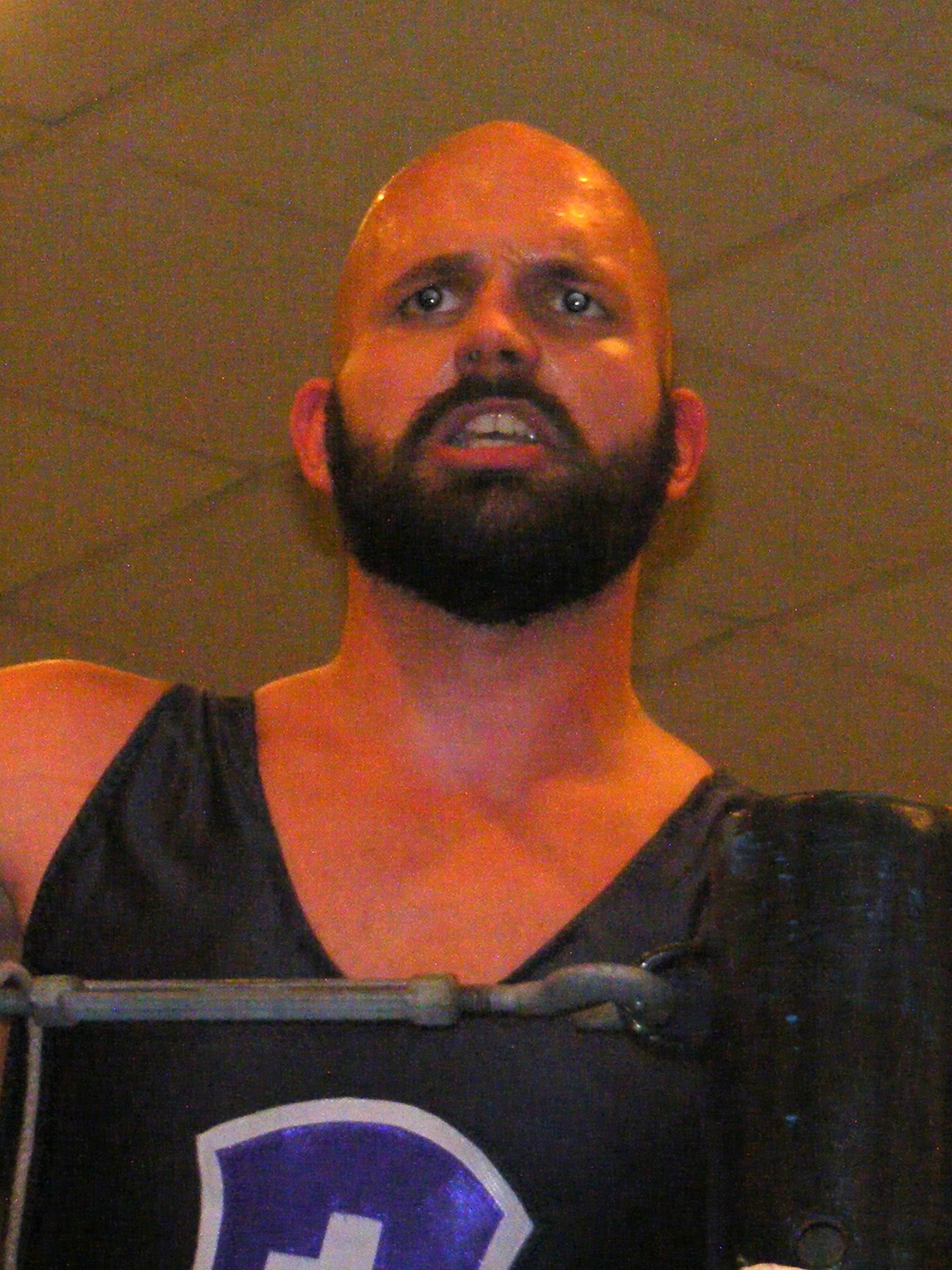
- Ares in 2010

Personal information
- Born: Marco Jaggi; January 12, 1980 (age 46) Biel/Bienne, Switzerland
- Spouse: Allison Danger (m. 2008)
- Children: 1
- Family: Steve Corino (brother in-law)

Professional wrestling career
- Ring name(s): Are$ Ares; Ares Procter
- Billed height: 5 ft 11 in (1.80 m)
- Billed weight: 230 lb (100 kg)
- Billed from: Zurich, Switzerland; United Bank of Switzerland
- Trained by: Chris Hero; Christian Eckstein; Joe E. Legend; Mike Quackenbush; Tony St. Clair; SigMasta Rappo; Skayde
- Debut: June 1998

Marco Jaggi (born January 12, 1980) is a Swiss professional wrestler and wrestling trainer, known by his ring name Ares (or Are$), who primarily competes in European and American independent promotions. For much of his career, Jaggi teamed with Claudio Castagnoli and Marc Roudin as part of Swiss Money Holding. One of the top tag teams in Europe during the 2000s, the trio won titles in Germany, France, the United Kingdom and their native Switzerland. Under the Freebird Rule, Jaggi held the IPW:UK Tag Team Championship with Castagnoli and Roudin for a record 12 months.

They eventually toured the United States in 2003, appearing for IWA Mid-South and Chikara, and took part in the 2003 Tag World Grand Prix. After returning to Europe, Castagnoli decided to return to the United States to regularly compete for Chikara. Jaggi then brought in Marc Roudin to fill in for Castagnoli and spent several years teaming together. He would also have an accomplished career as a singles competitor, wrestling in countries as far away as Algeria, South Africa and Japan, and was the head trainer for IWA-Switzerland.

After his marriage to Allison Danger in 2008, Jaggi followed Castagnoli to the United States. He made a surprise appearance at Chikara's “Three-Fisted Tales” show where he and Castagnoli reunited to form the "heel" stable BDK in 2009, and went on to win the 2010 King of Trios with fellow stablemate Tursas.

== Professional wrestling career ==
=== Early career (1998–2001) ===
Born in Biel, Switzerland, Marco Jaggi was a fan of wrestling growing up and became interested in entering the business as a teenager. Opportunities to do so in Switzerland were virtually non-existent at the time and, after looking for wrestling schools elsewhere, took a flight to Germany to train with the Wrestling Catch Fans Berlin promotion. Jaggi trained 6-hours a day for three weeks prior to making his debut in June 1998, but wrestled in only four matches during the next three years. He was unable to attend the school year round and could only visit Germany during summer holidays where he would train for a short period, wrestle one opponent, then return to Switzerland. Between 2001 and 2005, Jaggi attended numerous wrestling clinics held by the likes of Jorge "Skayde" Rivera, Mike Quackenbush, Ian Rotten, Joe E. Legend and Ecki Eckstein. He later claimed to regret starting his career "too early" and, later as a trainer, advocated students should train for a minimum of half a year.

=== Swiss Money Holding (2001–2003) ===
In 2001, Jaggi joined Westside Xtreme Wrestling (wXw) based in Essen, Germany. It was shortly after his debut that his trainer SigMasta Rappo and HATE suggested he form a tag team with another of his students Claudio Castagnoli. Swiss Money Holding made its debut against Euro Threat (HATE and SigMasta Rappo) at wXw's "Taste It Twice" supercard on May 13, 2001. He and Castagnoli, another Swiss wrestler, worked well together and their "heel" in-ring personas, a parody of Swiss bankers, almost immediately caught on with the fans. They defeated Euro Threat two months later to become the first wXw Tag Team Champions, and would win the titles two more times within a year.

Their televised matches for wXw, aired by Southwestern German Broadcasting Corporation, made them one of the most visible tag teams of the promotion and, in time, the two began wrestling in other German and European promotions as well. On September 29, 2002, Jaggi won the Swiss Wrestling Federation Heavyweight Championship, and with Castagnoli, became the first German Stampede Wrestling Tag Team Champions on March 29, 2003. Other organizations they appeared for included Athletik Club Wrestling, European Wrestling Fighters, and the New Alliance of Wrestling Athletes in Germany, Austria's Riotgas Wrestling Alliance and Wrestling Warriors Austria, and Freestyle Championship Wrestling in the Netherlands.

The two often faced each other in single matches, most notably, in a 4 Way Dance against American wrestlers Chris Hero and Mike Quackenbush at the 2-day wXw supercard "Gott Eggs?" on April 18, 2003. They also faced Hero and Quackenbush as Swiss Money Holding, and Hero in singles matches throughout the year.

=== Touring the United States (2003) ===
Impressed by their performance, Chris Hero invited Jaggi and Castagnoli to perform in the United States. That summer, the two toured the country appearing at shows for a number of independent promotions on the East Coast and Midwestern United States. On July 4, 2003, Swiss Money Holding made their US debut for IWA Mid South defeating Chris Hero and Mark Wolf at the "We Are Family" supercard in Clarksville, Indiana. The following night, they participated in Chikara's 2003 Tag World Grand Prix in Allentown, Pennsylvania. They defeated Senior Assault Team (Melvin Snodgrass and Lester Crabtree) in the first round, but were eliminated along with the SuperFriends (Chris Hero and Mike Quackenbush) after fighting to a time limit draw.

They made a second appearance at the IWA Arena on July 12 and, the next night, Jaggi and Castagnoli appeared in a third supercard, "X-treme Combat III", for Xtreme Intense Championship Wrestling in Warren, Michigan. In the main event, Swiss Money Holding wrestled in a 3 Way Dance against Jaimy CoxXx and Alex Shelley and XICW Tag Team Champions Gavin Starr and Jimmy Jacobs.

=== Singles career (2003–2006) ===
Shortly after their return to Europe, Castagnoli opted to return to the United States to compete full-time for Chikara. Jaggi then brought in Marc Roudin, a young cruiserweight wrestler they had both trained, to take Castagnoli place. Though Castagnoli would return to team with Jaggi and Roudin, Swiss Money Holding being billed as a 3-man tag team, his continuing involvement with Chikara (and later Ring of Honor) resulted in Jaggi mostly teaming with Roudin for the next few years. Jaggi would continue to win titles with both men, however, appearances by all three members were rare.

He also began to make a name for himself as a singles competitor. On March 6, 2004, Jaggi defeated Michael Kovac to become the first heavyweight champion for German Stampede Wrestling and toured Algeria with Force Francophone de Catch five months later. In early-2005, he also became the first ROE Switzerland Heavyweight Champion during its "March Madness Tour '05" when he defeated The Honky Tonk Man in Weesen, Switzerland on March 12. Over the next year, he would face opponents such as Samoa Joe, Colt Cabana, Steve Corino, Nigel McGuinness, Naomichi Marufuji, Kenta Kobashi and Doug Williams.

On April 9, 2005, Jaggi teamed with Marc Roudin to regain the GSW Tag Team Championship from Eric Schwarz and Michael Kovac. In Italian Championship Wrestling, he won the ICW Heavyweight title from Red Devil at ICW's "Il Numero Uno" supercard in Belluno on April 12. Jaggi lost the ICW title to Kaio in Rimini a month later. At its June 25 supercard, The Wrestling Event, Jaggi teamed with A-Train in a tag team match against Kaio and Test in Varese, Italy. He later wrestled Kaio for the title later that night but the match ended in a no-contest.

A month later in Toulouse, France, Jaggi took part in an 8-man championship tournament to crown Force Francophone de Catch's first 2FC Champion on July 3. Defeating Spud to advance to the finals, he lost to Jonny Storm in a 4 Way Dance with Bryan Danielson and Jody Fleisch; Jaggi had eliminated Danielson and Fleisch before being pinned by Storm.

On September 23, 2005, Swiss Money Holding was scheduled to appear for Italian Championship Wrestling's "Pandemonium IV" in Sondrio, Italy to face its tag team champions the Party Boyz (Ace and Andres Diamond). When Ares showed up without a partner, there was some confusion as to which team member would be joining him. While conducting an in-ring interview with the Party Boyz, General Manager Amarillo attacked both men revealing himself to be Ares' secret partner. In their title match later that night, Amarillo was pinned by Andres Diamond.

At the end of the year, Jaggi won the wXw World Heavyweight Championship from Robbie Brookside on October 2, 2005, and again from Mike Quackenbush at a Chikara show in Reading, Pennsylvania, almost six months later. On January 27, 2006, he entered wXw's 16 Carat Gold Tournament and was eliminated by Ian Rotten in the first round. That same night he defended the heavyweight title in separate matches against Bernard Vandamme and Mickie Knuckles. In April, Jaggi wrestled a 2-day card for the Fighting Spirit Federation in Marseille, France. On April 15, he teamed with April Hunter in a mixed tag team match against Nikita and Red Devil. Jaggi and his old ICW rival met again the following night when they both lost to Lance Hoyt a 3 Way Dance. Also that month, he entered a championship tournament in Roth, Germany, for the German Wrestling Promotion but lost to Monty Brown in the opening round.

On May 6, he and Steve Douglas lost to ICWA World Junior Heavyweight Champion Jonny Storm in a 3 Way Dance at the International Catch Wrestling Alliance's "Revolution III" in Bruay-sur-l'Escaut, France. A day later, he won the FSF Heavyweight Championship in Montreuil-Juigné. He successfully defended the title against Chad Collyer and Absolute Andy before losing to Johan three months later. At wXw's "True Colors", Jaggi entered a trios tournament with Bad Bones and Emil Sitoci. They defeated the High Class Catch Club (Adam Polak and Baron von Hagen) and Tracy Smothers in the opening round, but lost to Doug Williams, Takashi Sugiura and Yoshinobu Kanemaru in the finals.

In the fall of 2006, Jaggi visited Japan during Pro Wrestling NOAH's "Autumn Navigation" tour. He spent most of the tour wrestling tag team and trios matches with fellow European wrestlers Murat Bosporus, Nigel McGuinness, Scorpio and Doug Williams. Among Japanese wrestlers he faced included Jun Akiyama, Masashi Aoyagi, Tsutomu Hirayanagi, Mitsuharu Misawa, Yoshinari Ogawa, Akitoshi Saito, Takuma Sano, Akira Taue and Muhammad Yone. He also teamed with Kentaro Shiga and Yoshinobu Kanemaru to defeat Go Shiozaki, KENTA and Tamon Honda in Utsunomiya, Japan, on October 11, and with Shiga and SUWA to defeat Honda, Shuhei Taniguchi and Tsuyoshi Kikuchi at the Yokkaichi Memorial Hall in Mie four days later. Jaggi's last match on the tour was a trios match with Doug Williams and Nigel McGuinness beating Ippei Ota, Kishin Kawabata and Masao Inoue at Tokyo's Budokan Hall on October 29, 2006. The match was later broadcast on Japanese television.

=== Swiss Money Holding (2006–2008) ===
Throughout his time as a singles competitor, Jaggi was also teaming with Claudio Castagnoli and Marc Roudin. During their first year together, he and Roudin regained the GSW Tag Team Championship from Eric Schwarz and Michael Kovac and held the titles for 15 months. They would also win the ROE Switzerland and Fighting Spirit Federation tag team titles in early-2007.

On December 10, 2006, Swiss Money Holding made their debut in International Pro Wrestling: United Kingdom where Jaggi and Castagnoli unexpectedly defeated Dragon Phoenix and Bubblegum for the IPW:UK Tag Team Championship in Colchester, England. There was some controversy surround their victory as Bubblegum had been a substitute for the recently injured co-champion Spud. After defending the titles at wXw's "Back To The Roots VI" in Germany, Jaggi returned to IPW: UK with Roudin and silenced their critics by defeating the former champions The Dragon Hearts (Phoenix and Spud) in a rematch in Orpington on February 18, 2007. The team successfully defended the titles against Team NOAH (Doug Williams and Go Shiozaki) on April 22, and The Dragon Hearts at the "A Taste Of IPW" show a week later. Jaggi and Castagnoli also entered the 2007 King Of Europe Cup with Trent Acid at the Olympia in Liverpool but were eliminated by the team of Atsushi Aoki, El Generico and Martin Stone.

Over the summer, Swiss Money Holding feuded with The Kartel (Sha Samuels and Terry Frazier). Meeting them at IPW: UK's 2-day "3rd Anniversary Weekend" show on September 22, he and Roudin managed to save their titles via a disqualification loss. Their luck finally ran out the following night when The Kartel beat them for the titles at Orpington Halls. on September 23.

Jaggi also made a US appearance on November 7, teaming with Allison Danger in a mixed tag team match against Mr. Wrestling 3 and Shark Girl at the Carolina Wrestling Association's "All Or Nothing II" in York, South Carolina. Becky Bayless was the special guest referee. A month later, Swiss Money Holding defeated SigMasta Rappo and British Stallion at "Winter Heat" for Swiss Championship Wrestling on December 15, 2007.

On January 19, 2008, Jaggi and Castagnoli faced fellow stablemate Marc Roudin and Chris Hero for the wXw Tag Team titles. Roudin and Hero had won them from AbLas (Absolute Andy and Steve Douglas) in Oberhausen, Germany, the previous November. At "IPW: UK vs. The World", Swiss Money Holding once more attempted to win back the IPW: UK titles from The Kartel at Broxbourne Civic Hall on March 15 but failed to defeat them. This was their last appearance in the promotion.

At the end of the year, Castagnoli and Roudin entered the 2008 Tag World Grand Prix in Oberhausen, Germany, on November 4, 2008. They were eliminated in the first round by The UnStable (Vin Gerard and STIGMA) when Gerard pinned Roudin.

=== United States independent circuit (2009–present) ===
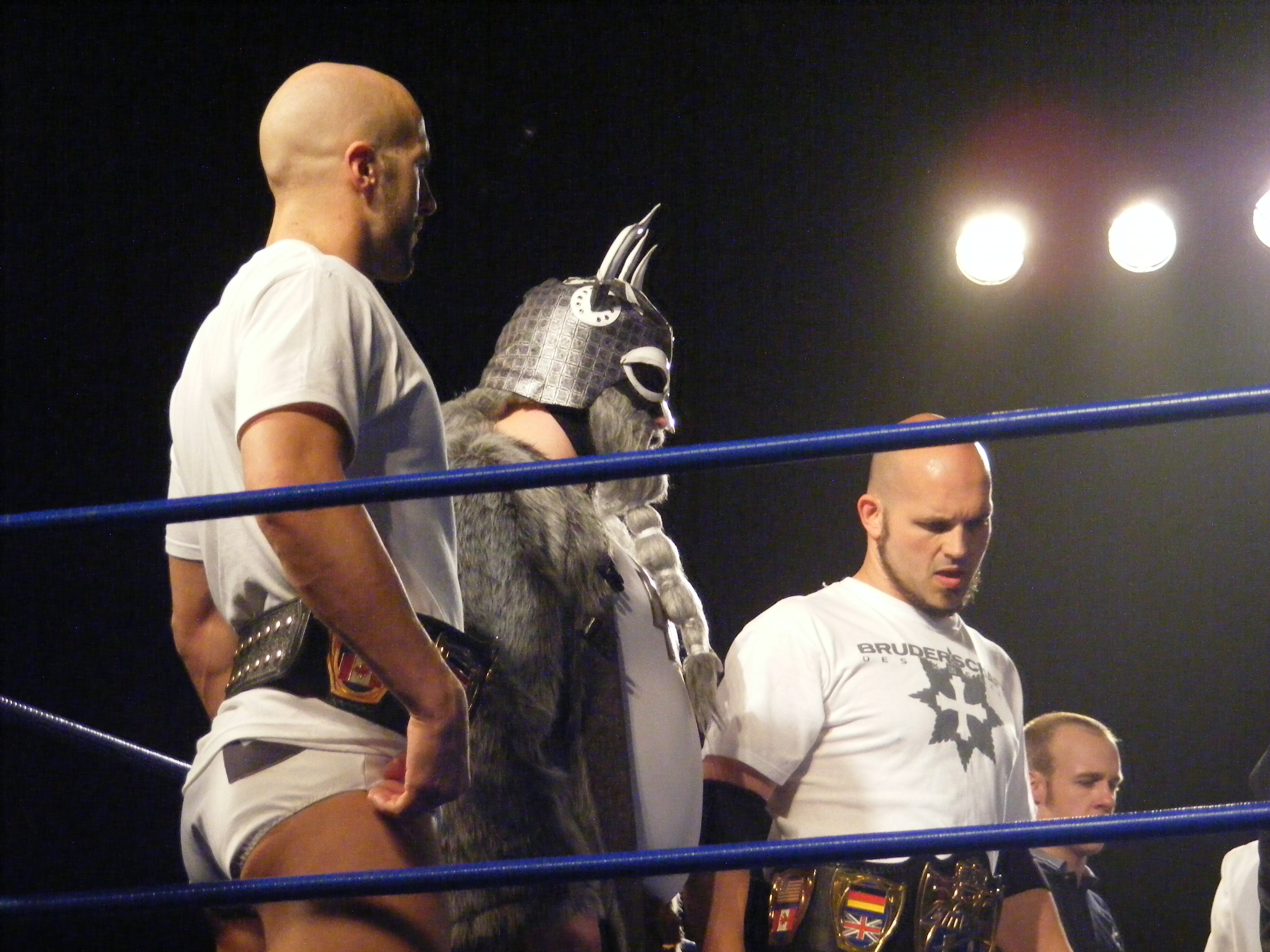
Ares (right) with Castagnoli (left) as the Chikara Campeones de Parejas, with Tursas (center) at the 2010 King of Trios

Around this time, Jaggi announced his intention to wrestle full-time in the United States prior to his marriage to American female wrestler Allison Danger in June 2008. Moving to Emerald Isle, North Carolina, he began competing for independents in the Carolinas and in the Mid-Atlantic United States. On January 29, 2009, he and Castagnoli took on the Carolina Wrestling Federation's Team Maction ("Krazy K" Kirby Mack and T.J. Mack) at the Carolina Sports Arena in Burlington, North Carolina. Kirby Mack sprained his right elbow during this match.

After six years, the official SMH reunion between Jaggi and Castagnoli took place at the end of Chikara's “Three-Fisted Tales” show in Philadelphia, Pennsylvania, on November 22, 2009. When Jaggi revealed himself as the masked man who had been stalking UltraMantis Black, Castagnoli turned heel and attacked ally Mike Quackenbush. After beating the entire face roster Castagnoli aligned himself with Jaggi, Tursas, Pinkie Sanchez, Tim Donst, Sara Del Rey and Daizee Haze to form the Bruderschaft des Kreuzes. At Chikara's "A Touch of Class" show, Jaggi and Castagnoli teamed with fellow BDK stablemates Tursas and Lince Dorado in an 8-man tag team match against Mike Quackenbush, Jigsaw, Jimmy “Equinox” Olsen and Eddie Kingston on January 31, 2010. Their team won when Castagnoli pinned Kingston.

After picking up the three points needed in order to challenge for the Campeonatos de Parejas in just one weekend, Castagnoli and Jaggi defeated The Colony (Fire Ant and Soldier Ant) on March 20, 2010, to win the titles, making Castagnoli the first two-time Campeon de Parejas in Chikara history. In April Castagnoli, Jaggi and Tursas defeated the teams of The Osirian Portal (Amasis and Ophidian) and Sara Del Rey, Team Perros del Mal (El Alebrije, Cuije and El Orientál), Team Big Japan Wrestling (Daisuke Sekimoto, Kankuro Hoshino and Yuji Okabayashi) and The Colony (Fire Ant, Soldier Ant and Green Ant) over a three-day tournament to win the 2010 King of Trios. On October 23 Ares captained BDK in the torneo cibernetico match, where they faced a team composed of Chikara originals. He was eliminated from the match by Team Chikara's captain UltraMantis Black. Ares avenged the loss on November 21, defeating UltraMantis Black in a Falls Count Anywhere match with help from Tursas. At the season nine finale on December 12, Ares and Castagnoli lost the Campeonatos de Parejas to Jigsaw and Mike Quackenbush. Ares' run with BDK and Chikara ended on November 13, 2011, at Chikara's first ever pay-per-view, High Noon, where he and Tim Donst were defeated in a No Disqualification match by Hallowicked and UltraMantis Black. Ares returned to Chikara in late 2013 alongside BDK as part of the Flood stable. On September 19, 2014, longtime BDK member Jakob Hammermeier had the rest of the stable turn on Ares, taking over the leadership of BDK.

== Personal life ==
Jaggi married fellow professional wrestler Allison Danger in 2008. The couple have one child together.

== Championships and accomplishments ==
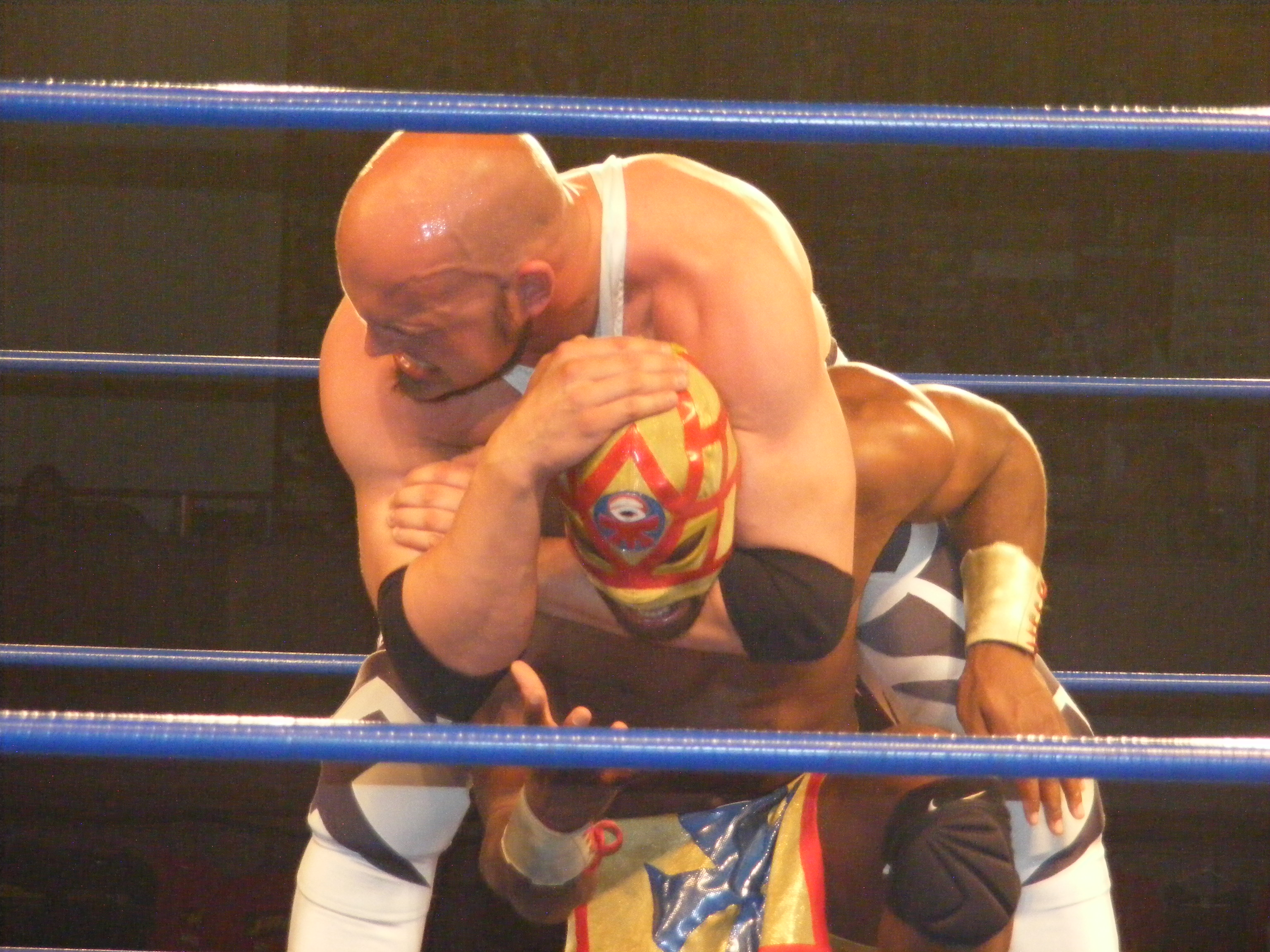
Ares performing a sleeper hold on Amasis.

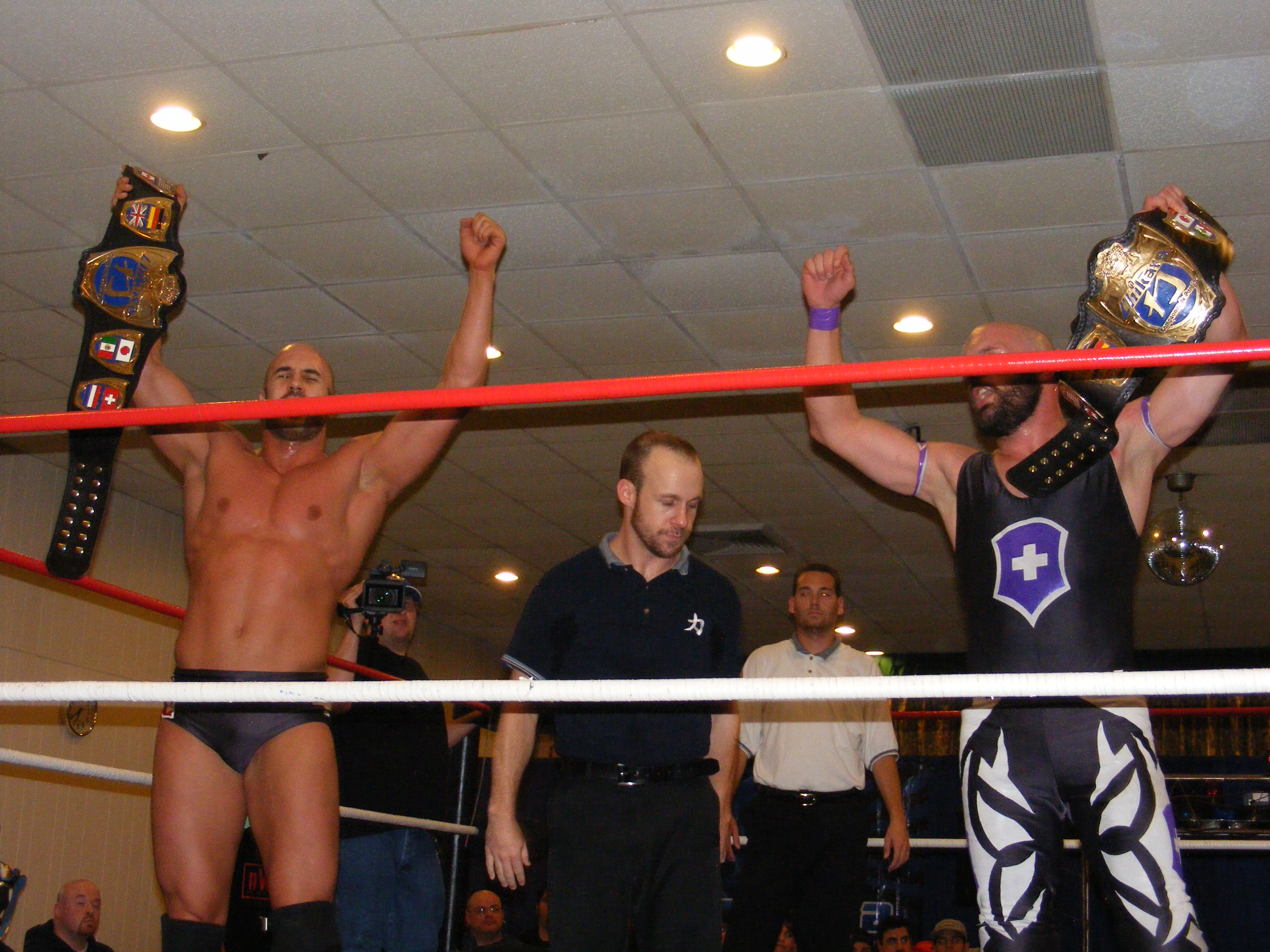
Ares and Claudio Castagnoli as the Chikara Campeones de Parejas in October 2010.

- Chikara
  - Campeonatos en Parejas (1 times) – with Claudio Castagnoli
  - King of Trios (2010) – with Claudio Castagnoli and Tursas
- Fighting Spirit Federation
  - FSF World Championship (2 time)
  - FSF Tag Team Championship (1 time) – with Marc Roudin
  - FSF Tag Team Championship Tournament (2007) - with Marc Roudin
- German Stampede Wrestling
  - GSW World Heavyweight Championship (2 times)
  - GSW Tag Team Championship (2 times) – with Claudio Castagnoli and Marc Roudin
  - GSW World Heavyweight Championship Tournament (2004)
- International Pro Wrestling: United Kingdom
  - IPW:UK Tag Team Championship (1 time) – with Claudio Castagnoli and Marc Roudin
- Italian Championship Wrestling
  - ICW Italian Championship (1 time)
- Mega Championship Wrestling
  - MCW United States Tag Team Championship (1 time) - with TJ Dynamite
- Pro Wrestling Illustrated
  - PWI ranked him #122 of the top 500 singles wrestlers in the PWI 500 in 2007
- Revolution Pro Wrestling
  - Undisputed British Tag Team Championship (1 time) – with Claudio Castagnoli
- Rings of Europe
  - Wilfried Ctyroky Memorial Battle Royal (2006)
- Rings of Europe Switzerland
  - ROE Switzerland Heavyweight Championship (1 time)
  - ROE Switzerland Tag Team Championship (1 time) – with Marc Roudin
- Swiss Championship Wrestling
  - SCW Heavyweight Championship (1 time)
- Swiss Wrestling Federation
  - SWF Heavyweight Championship (1 time)
- Westside Xtreme Wrestling
  - wXw World Heavyweight Championship (2 times)
  - wXw Tag Team Championship (3 times) – with Claudio Castagnoli
  - Hall of Fame (Class of 2015)
