= Osirian Portal =

Professional wrestling tag team

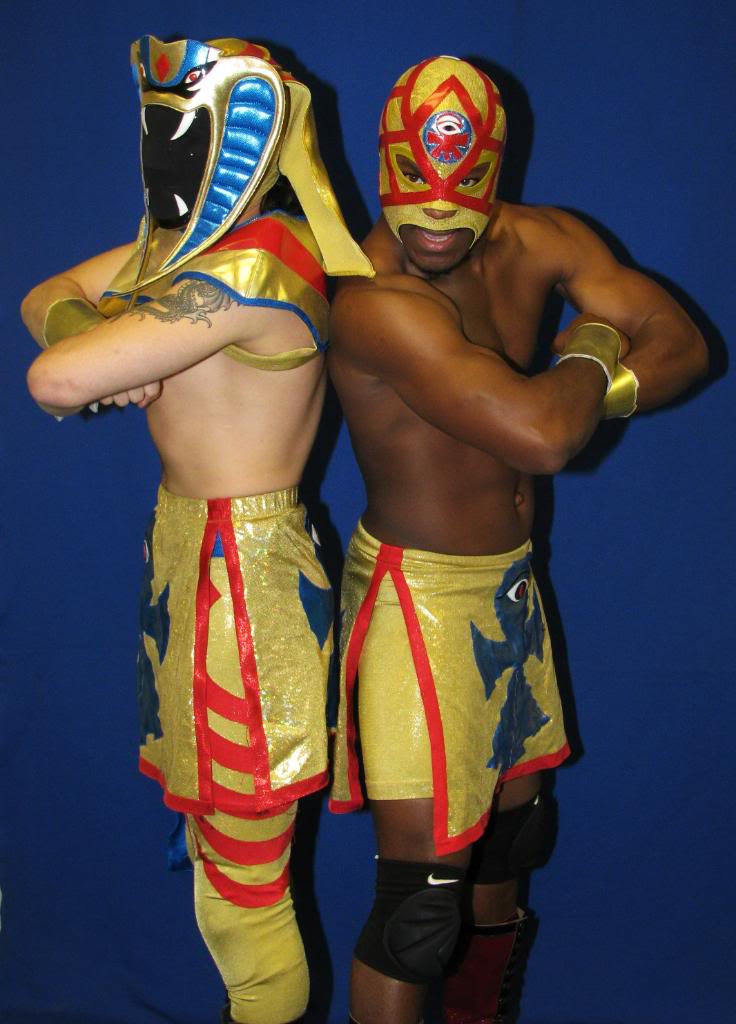
- Ophidian (left) and Amasis (right) before a JAPW show in 2010

Statistics
- Members: Amasis; Ophidian; Escorpion Egipcio; Hieracon
- Billed heights: Amasis: 5 ft 9 in (175 cm); Ophidian: 5 ft 8 in (173 cm)
- Combined billed weight: 344 lb (156 kg)
- Billed from: Amasis: Sais, Egypt "The 36th Chamber"; Ophidian: Nile River, Egypt
- Debut: September 22, 2007

The Osirian Portal is a professional wrestling tag team, consisting of Amasis and Ophidian. The team mainly competed in Chikara, where they held the Campeonatos de Parejas, and Combat Zone Wrestling (CZW). They have also made appearances in Ring of Honor (ROH) and several other independent promotions based in the north eastern part of the United States. The tag team eventually expanded into a stable with the additions of Escorpion Egipcio and Hieracon. Amasis was forced to retire from professional wrestling in June 2011 as a result of a non-wrestling accident, which led to the official dissolution of the team in September. Amasis returned to the ring in early 2013, starting a rivalry between the two former tag team partners. The team reunited in mid-2013.

== History ==
Both Amasis and Ophidian trained at the Chikara wrestling school and upon their graduation adopted their gimmick and their masks to become the Osirian Portal, a team inspired by ancient Egyptian culture, with Amasis adopting the gimmick of a break dancing pharaoh and Ophidian that of an anthropomorphic King Cobra. Part of their gimmick involves hypnosis, wherein Amasis would hold Ophidian in a wheelbarrow hold, while the latter places his hands together and waves them in front of their opponents, hypnotizing them.

=== Chikara ===
Amasis and Ophidian made their debut as a tag team on September 22, 2007, at the Chikara show Cibernetico and Robin, defeating ShaneSaw (Shane Storm and Jigsaw) in their first match together. Ophidian had made his debut on June 5 at an XCW Wrestling Mid-West event and had wrestled two matches on his own in Chikara, on July 4 and 21, while for Amasis this was his professional wrestling debut. In early 2008 Amasis and Ophidian entered the King of Trios tournament along with Mecha Mummy forming Team Egypt. The team lost in the first round to Mike Quackenbush, Shane Storm, and Jorge "Skayde" Rivera. After their debut the team worked its way through the ranks and earned three points (three straight victories) which are required for a team to challenge for the Chikara Campeonatos de Parejas under Chikara rules. On May 18, 2008, at Chikara's Grit and Glory show they challenged the Campeones de Parejas, Incoherence (Delirious and Hallowicked), for the titles, but were defeated in two straight falls. After the title match The Portal went on a losing streak, which ended on September 7, 2008, at Style and Substance when they defeated Up In Smoke (Cheech and Cloudy) in a Tag World Grand Prix qualifying match. They picked up two more victories over the teams of Da Soul Touchaz (Marshe Rockett and Acid Jaz) and Atsushi Ohashi and Shinya Ishikawa to once again earn three points and a match for the tag team titles. On October 19, 2008, at Chikara's The Global Gauntlet: Night 2, just 24 hours after gaining their third point, the Osirian Portal defeated the Super Smash Brothers (Player Uno and Player Dos) to win the tag team titles.

==== Campeonatos de Parejas and Escorpion Egipcio ====
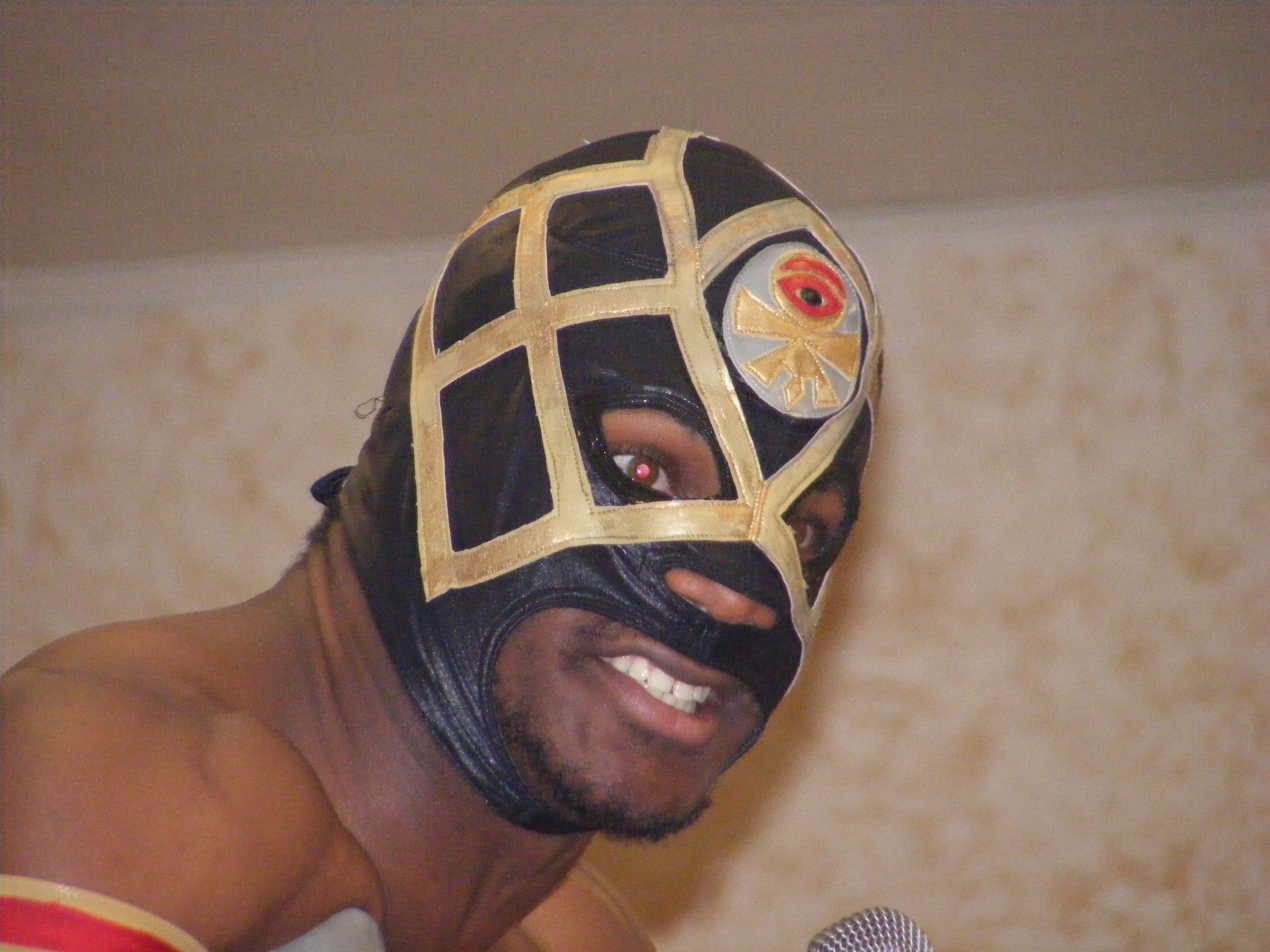
Amasis in 2008

In November 2008 the new champions traveled to Germany to take part in the 2008 Tag World Grand Prix 2008. In the opening round, they defeated The Thrillers (Wade Fitzgerald and Joel Redman) and in the semifinals they defeated the Chocolate City Saga (Tommy End and Andrew Patterson). The finals was a three-way elimination match between the last three teams, the Osirian Portal, The Colony (Fire Ant and Soldier Ant) and Martin Stone and PAC. The Colony won the match after Soldier Ant forced Ophidian to tap out with the Chikara Special. Upon returning to the United States, the team turned rudo and at the annual Torneo Cibernetico the Osirian Portal was a part of an eight-man team led by Vin Gerard. Ophidian was the last representative on Team Gerard, but in the end tapped out to Jimmy "Equinox" Olsen's version of the Chikara Special. During the match, Amasis injured his ankle and was therefore quickly removed from the match. Earlier in the night, Amasis and Ophidian introduced a man by the name of Escorpion Egipcio, who they claimed was sent by Osiris to become a new member of their team. Egipcio defeated Ultimo Breakfast in his debut match and the next night at Armdrags to Riches he replaced Amasis and teamed up with Ophidian to successfully defend the tag titles against Equinox and Lince Dorado. Afterwards, it was announced that Egipcio could no longer replace Amasis in The Portal's title defenses. Amasis had 90 days to recover, and on the first show of 2009, Revelation X, Amasis and Ophidian defended the Campeonatos de Parejas against Fire Ant and Soldier Ant of the Colony in a special one-fall match with Egipcio banned from the building. The Portal scored an upset victory and retained their titles, defeating the Colony, who came to the match with a seven match winning streak.

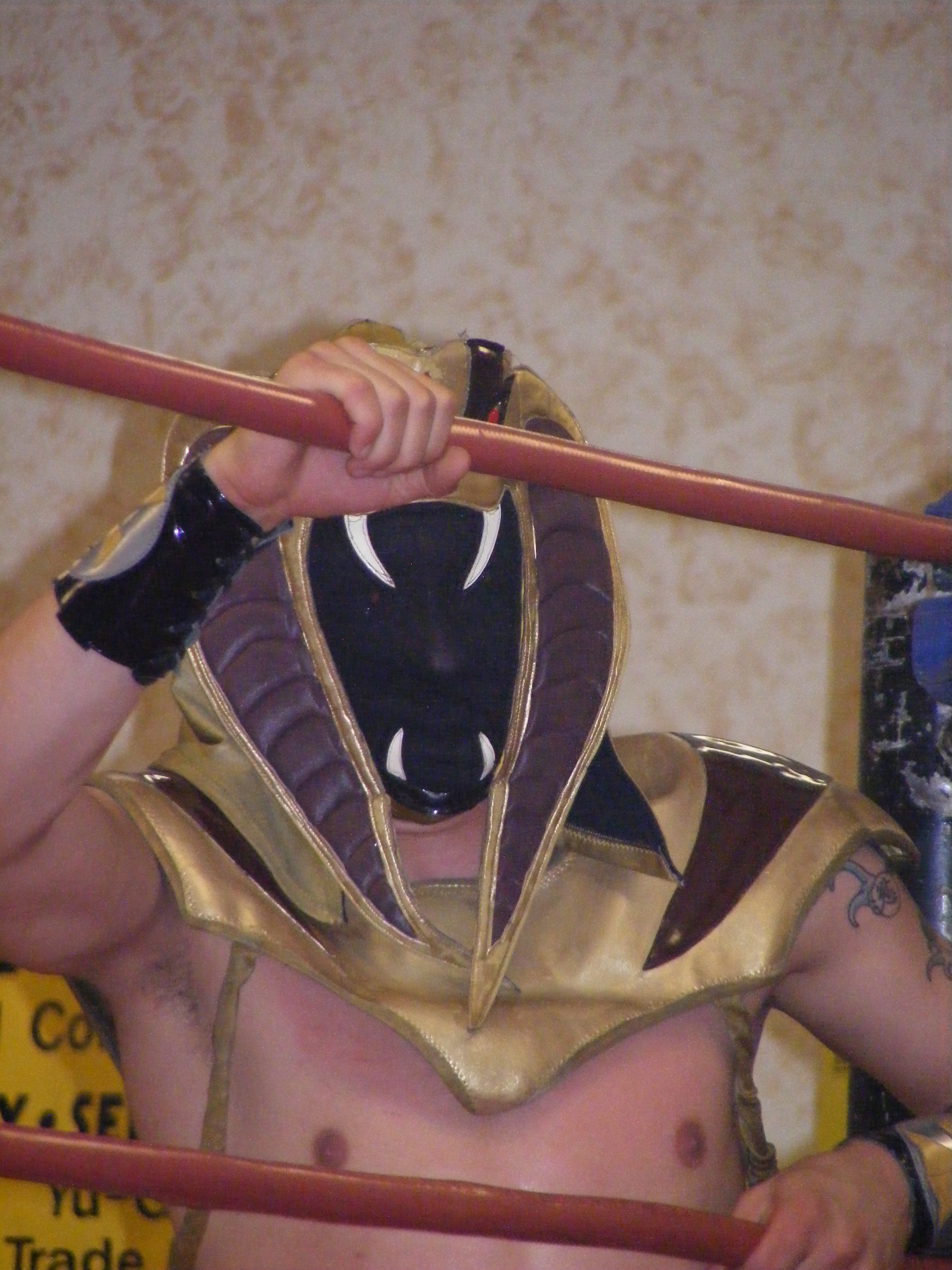
Ophidian in 2008

In March 2009, Amasis, Ophidian and Escorpion Egipcio entered the 2009 King of Trios tournament. On March 27, the first night of the tournament, they defeated Team PWG (El Generico and Nick and Matt Jackson) to move on to the following night's quarter finals, where they were defeated by The Future is Now (Equinox, Lince Dorado and Helios). The following month, after Egipcio suffered his first singles loss in a match against Helios and then a second trios loss against The Future Is Now, Ophidian wrote a blog on Chikara's official website where he blamed the losses on Egipcio and announced that he was kicked out of the team. Egipcio's profile has been since been removed from Chikara's roster page, confirming his departure. On September 13, 2009, at Hiding in Plain Sight The Colony (Fire Ant and Soldier Ant) defeated the Osirian Portal in two straight falls to win the Campeonatos de Parejas.

==== Tecnico turn ====
Over the course of the following October shows, Amasis and Ophidian turned tecnico and quickly scored three points, earning the right to challenge for the titles again. The Osirian Portal used their three points on November 22, 2009, to get a Championship match at the Season eight finale titled Three-Fisted Tales, where The Colony ended up retaining their titles two falls to one. On April 23, 2010, the Osirian Portal got in on the 2010 King of Trios tournament through a back door, when a random draw picked them to replace Team Mexico, who no-showed the event, and face the Bruderschaft des Kreuzes (BDK) (Ares, Claudio Castagnoli and Tursas) in the first round. Another random draw picked BDK member Sara Del Rey as Portal's trios partner and in the end she cost them the match by low blowing Ophidian, when he had Castagnoli locked in the Death Grip. After their elimination from the trios tournament, both Amasis and Ophidian entered the Rey de Voladores tournament, the following day. Amasis was defeated in his four-way elimination match by Matt Cross, while Ophidian won his four-way elimination match by defeating Frightmare, Cheech and Rich Swann. On April 25 Ophidian defeated Cross in a singles match to win the 2010 Rey de Voladores tournament. For the first half of 2010, the Osirian Portal feuded with the UnStable (Vin Gerard, STIGMA and Colin Delaney), during which Gerard and STIGMA managed to convince Amasis and Ophidian that they were turning tecnico and wanted no part of Delaney, only to reunite with him and attack the Osirian Portal, after defeating them in a tag team match on June 27. On July 26 at Chikarasaurus Rex: King of Show the Osirian Portal gained a measure of revenge on the UnStable, when they teamed with Drake Younger, who also had a history with Gerard and STIGMA, and defeated Gerard, STIGMA and Delaney in a six-man tag team match.

==== Hieracon and split ====
After the match at Chikarasaurus Rex: King of Show, Amasis and Ophidian decided that being a trio felt so right that they went on to search for a new third member of the Osirian Portal. In August both Amasis and Ophidian entered the eighth annual Young Lions Cup tournament. Amasis entered the tournament on August 27 and defeated Chrisjen Hayme to make it to the semifinal six-way match, where he was eliminated by Johnny Gargano. The following day Ophidian defeated Skull in his first round match to advance to the semifinals. In his semifinal match Ophidian outlasted four other competitors, before being defeated by BDK's Lince Dorado, after considerable help from the stable's own referee, Derek Sabato. On September 18 and 19 Amasis and Ophidian once again picked up three points by first defeating the Unstable (Vin Gerard and STIGMA), Obariyon and Kodama and Incoherence (Hallowicked and Frightmare) in a four-way elimination tag team match and then BDK representatives Delirious and Daizee Haze in a tag team match. The Osirian Portal received their title match on October 24, 2010, but were defeated by the defending champions, Ares and Claudio Castagnoli of the BDK, in two straight falls.

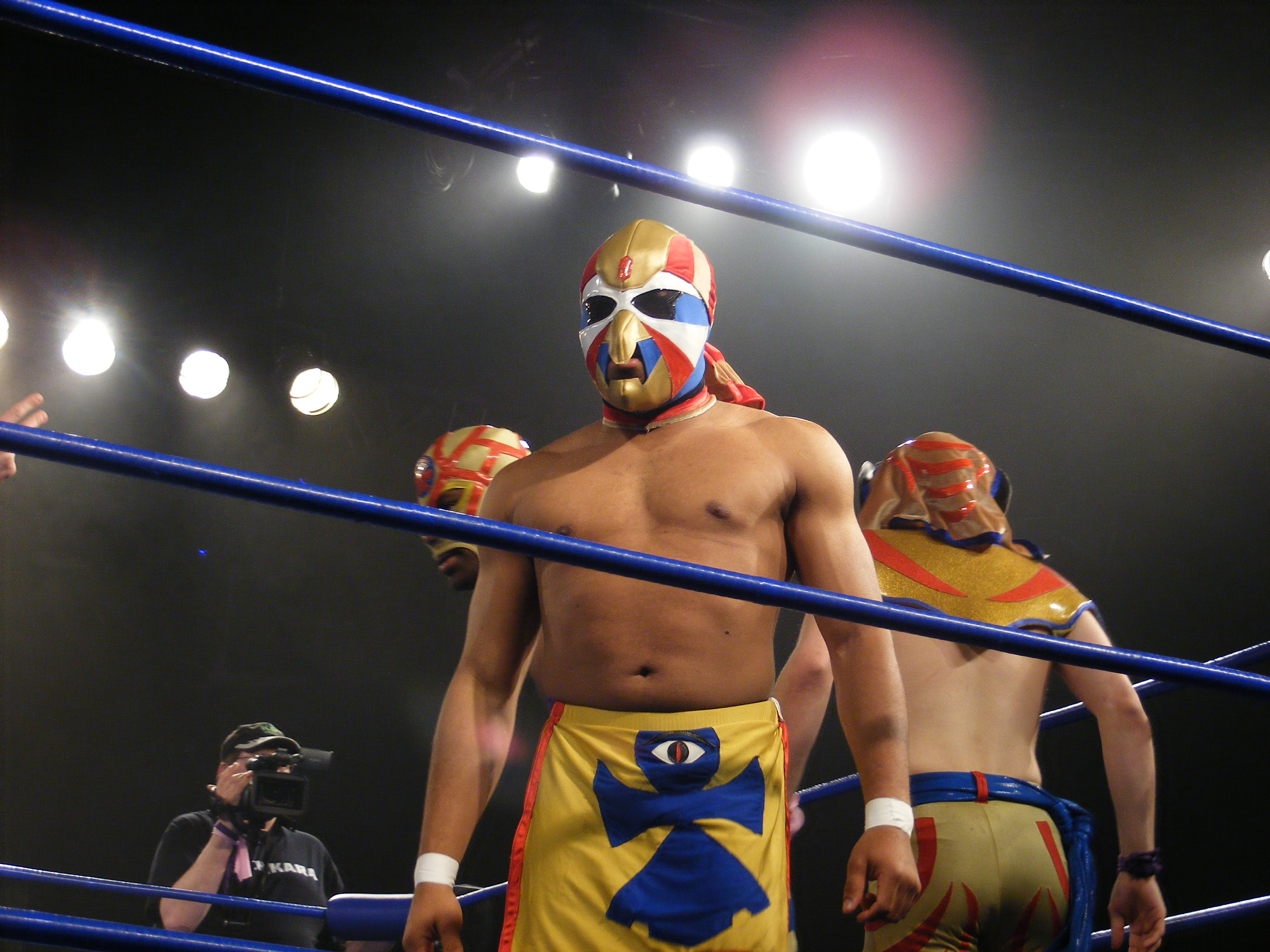
Hieracon in April 2011

At the season nine finale, titled Reality is Relative, on December 12, 2010, Amasis and Ophidian teamed with Jonathan Gresham, who was making his Chikara debut, in a six-man tag team match, where they defeated BDK members Delirious, Lince Dorado and Pinkie Sanchez. At the season ten premiere, Chaos in the Sea of Lost Souls, on January 23, 2011, Gresham was made an official member of the Osirian Portal as he was rebranded Hieracon and donned a mask in a six-man tag team match, where he, Amasis and Ophidian defeated F.I.S.T. (Chuck Taylor, Icarus and Johnny Gargano). On April 15, the Osirian Portal entered the 2011 King of Trios, defeating ¡3.0lé! (El Generico, Scott Parker and Shane Matthews) in their first round match. The following day they defeated Team Dragon Gate (Akira Tozawa, KAGETORA and Super Shisa) to advance to the semifinals of the tournament. The following day, the Osirian Portal was eliminated from the tournament in the semifinal stage by The Colony (Fire Ant, Green Ant and Soldier Ant), who would go on to win the entire tournament.

On April 21, Amasis was named one of twelve participants in the tournament to determine first ever Chikara singles champion. However, on May 11 it was announced that Amasis had suffered "severe injuries in a non-wrestling accident" that would sideline him indefinitely and force him out of the tournament. On June 23 it was announced that Amasis had been forced to retire from professional wrestling due to his injuries. The following month Ophidian was sidelined with a severely broken jaw. On September 22, Chikara's Director of Fun, Wink Vavasseur, announced that without Amasis there would be no Osirian Portal, effectively dissolving the group.

==== Feud between Amasis and Ophidian ====
On November 13, 2011, at Chikara's first internet pay-per-view, High Noon, Amasis returned to officially announce his retirement. Afterwards, Ophidian attacked his former partner and unmasked him, turning rudo in the process. On January 28, 2012, Ophidian, debuting a new mask, defeated Hieracon in a singles match and afterwards took his mask. Amasis returned on December 2, 2012, at Chikara's third internet pay-per-view, Under the Hood, distracting Ophidian in the audience during a ten-man tag team match. Amasis came out of his retirement and wrestled his return match at an On Point Wrestling event on January 5, 2013, where he took part in a four-way match, which was won by LJ Cruz. Amasis kept confronting Ophidian at Chikara events in early 2013, which led to the promotion announcing the first match between the two former partners for April 6. The match ended in a no contest, when Amasis was attacked by The Batiri. This led to Chikara's fourth iPPV, Aniversario: Never Compromise on June 2, where Amasis defeated Ophidian in a Sarcophagus match. On July 21 at Chikara's sister promotion Wrestling is Cool's inaugural event, Ophidian returned to save Amasis from a post-match beatdown at the hands of Chuck Taylor and Orange Cassidy. While Chikara was inactive, the Osirian Portal once again began teaming together in promotions such as Combat Zone Wrestling (CZW) and Dragon Gate USA.

=== Ring of Honor ===
Amasis and Ophidian made their Ring of Honor (ROH) debut on June 7, 2008, at the tapings of the Respect is Earned II pay-per-view where they were defeated by the team of Shane Hagadorn and Mitch Franklin in a dark match. They returned to the company on October 25, 2008, at Ring of Homicide II where they were defeated by the ROH World Tag Team Champions Kevin Steen and El Generico in a non-title match.

=== Pro Wrestling Zero1 ===
On May 5, 2010, Amasis and Ophidian made their debut for Japanese promotion Pro Wrestling Zero1, defeating Munenori Sawa and Shota Takanishi in a tag team match. Three days later they were defeated by Sawa and Ikuto Hidaka in a match for the NWA International Lightweight Tag Team Championship.

=== Combat Zone Wrestling ===
Amasis and Ophidian made their debuts for Combat Zone Wrestling (CZW) on August 14, 2010, at Tangled Web 3, where they defeated The Best Around (Bruce Maxwell and T.J. Cannon) in the first round of a tournament for the vacant CZW World Tag Team Championship. On October 9 Amasis wrestled in a four-way match, which was won by Rich Swann and also included Ryan Slater and Sabian. At the following event on October 16, Amasis and Ophidian wrestled Irish Driveby (Rich Swann and Ryan McBride) to a fifteen-minute time limit draw. On November 13 at Night of Infamy 9: Betrayal the Osirian Portal defeated The Runaways (Joe Gacy and Ryan Slater) in the semifinals of the World Tag Team Championship tournament. The video clip of Amasis and Ophidian hypnotizing Gacy and Slater in the finish of the match gained them some major notoriety, garnering over two million hits on YouTube and being shown on ESPN's Around the Horn, TruTV Presents: World's Dumbest Hillbillies 4 and G4's Attack of the Show! It cemented Amasis' and Ophidian's spots as favorites among the CZW crowd. The finals of the tournament took place on December 12, 2010, at the Cage of Death XII pay-per-view, where the Osirian Portal was defeated by Philly's Most Wanted (Joker and Sabian). Amasis and Ophidian returned to CZW on February 12, 2011, at Twelve: The Twelfth Anniversary Event, interfering in a six–way Best of the Best qualifying match and using hypnosis to turn it into a dance–off, before helping Jonathan Gresham pick up the win. The Osirian Portal returned to CZW on August 10, 2013, defeating BLKOUT (Ruckus and Sabian) via disqualification in a CZW World Tag Team Championship match; as a result, BLKOUT retained the title. A rematch between the Osirian Portal and BLKOUT took place on September 14 and saw BLKOUT pick up a clean win to retain the title.

== Championships and accomplishments ==
- Chikara

- Chikara Campeonatos de Parejas (1 time) – Amasis and Ophidian
- Rey de Voladores (2010) – Ophidian

- NWA Force One Pro Wrestling
  - NWA Force One Pro Wrestling Tag Team Championship (1 time) – Amasis and Ophidian
- Pro Wrestling Illustrated
  - PWI ranked Amasis #349 of the top 500 singles wrestlers in the PWI 500 in 2011
  - PWI ranked Ophidian #346 of the top 500 singles wrestlers in the PWI 500 in 2011
- Real Championship Wrestling
  - RCW Tag Team Championship (1 time) – Amasis and Ophidian
- Wrestling is Fun!
  - WiF! Banana Championship (1 time) – Amasis
- Vicious Outcast Wrestling
  - VOW Tag Team Championship (1 time) – Amasis and Ophidian
