= Lince Dorado =

American professional wrestler

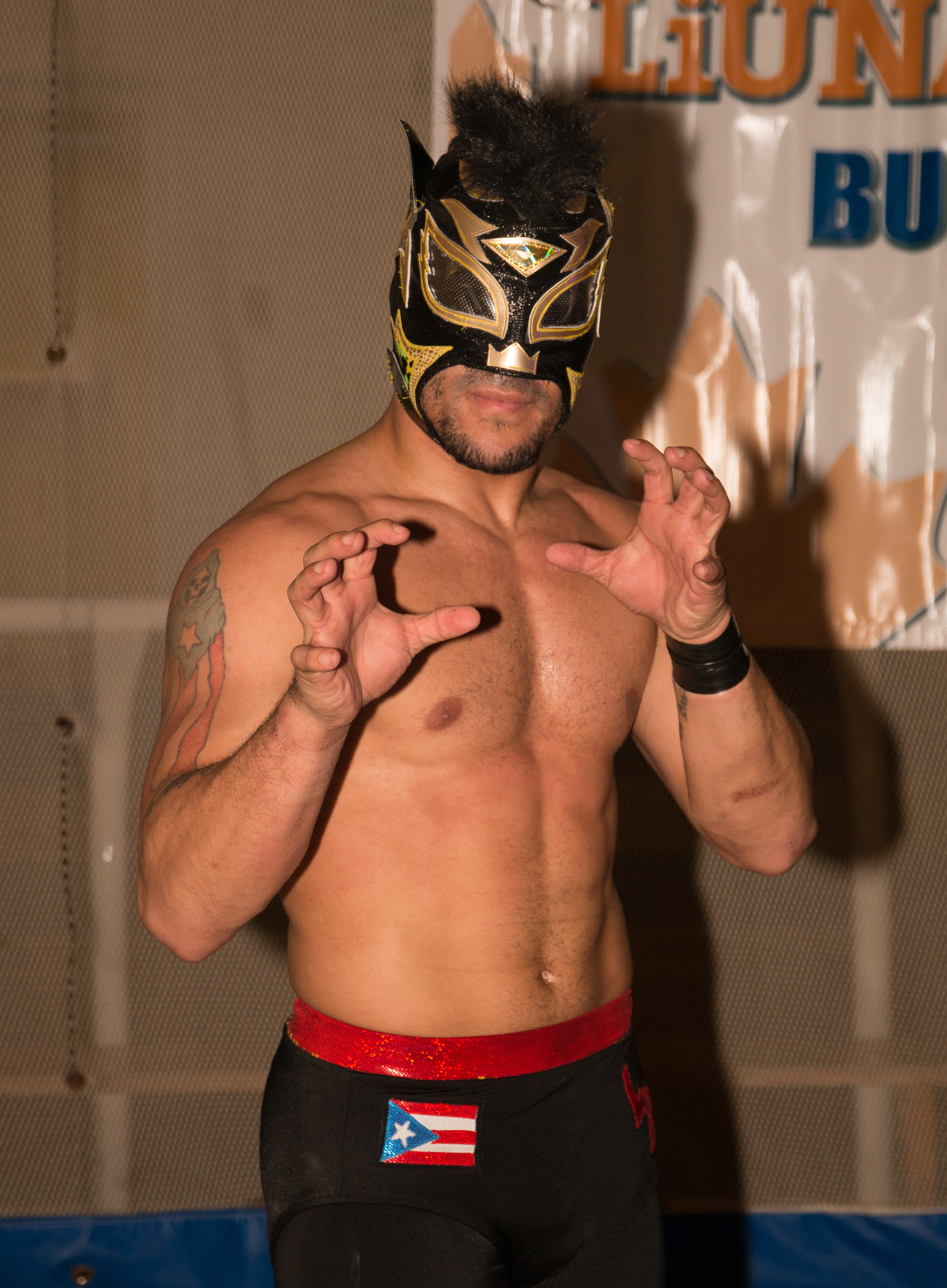
- Dorado in 2016

Personal information
- Born: José Rafael Cordero; May 11, 1987 (age 39) Camden, New Jersey

Professional wrestling career
- Ring name(s): Balam; Lince Dorado
- Billed height: 5 ft 7 in (1.70 m)
- Billed weight: 181 lb (82 kg)
- Billed from: Camden, New Jersey; San Juan, Puerto Rico; Chihuahua, Juárez, Mexico
- Trained by: Mike Quackenbush; Chris Hero; Claudio Castagnoli; Skayde; El Pantera
- Debut: February 17, 2007

José Rafael Cordero (born May 11, 1987), better known by his ring name Lince Dorado (Spanish for Golden Lynx), is an American professional wrestler of Puerto Rican ascentry. He is signed to WWE, where he serves as a trainer at the WWE Performance Center. He also performs for sister promotion Lucha Libre AAA Worldwide and occasionally on WWE's NXT and Evolve brands as a wrestler.

Cordero began his career in 2007, working for several independent promotions in Puerto Rico and United States, most notably the Philadelphia-based Chikara, where he won the 2008 edition of the King of Trios, a tournament between trios along with El Pantera and Incognito. He was formerly contacted by WWE in 2016 to be part of the Cruiserweight Classic, a tournament between several cruiserweight wrestlers. He was eliminated in the second round, but WWE offered him a contract. He was paired with masked wrestlers Kalisto and Gran Metalik to form a stable called Lucha House Party. Kalisto was released from his WWE contract in April 2021, with Dorado and Metalik later departing the company in November that year. After wrestling for various different companies, Dorado would later resign with WWE in February 2025 as a trainer.

== Professional wrestling career ==
=== Chikara (2007–2011) ===
==== Debut (2007–2008) ====
Dorado began his training in Mexico under El Pantera until he made his way back to the United States in early 2007. On February 17, Dorado, Pantera and Sicodelico, Jr. made their Chikara debuts as a part of Chikara's first-ever King of Trios tournament. The team made an impressive impact, as they advanced to the semi-finals before falling to the team of Mike Quackenbush and ShaneSaw (Shane Storm and Jigsaw). Shortly after the tournament, he moved to the U.S. and began residing in New Jersey in order to compete for Chikara in addition to various promotions in the area. Dorado quickly garnered fan support due to his high-flying wrestling style and he was soon entered into the first-ever Rey de Voladores tournament, which brought together some of the most talented high-flying wrestlers on the independent circuit. Despite advancing to the finals, including an upset win over established Chikara wrestler Jigsaw, Dorado lost the tournament Chuck Taylor. At the Anniversario weekend, Dorado began his first feud in Chikara against the returning "Marvelous" Mitch Ryder, which stemmed from Ryder's "patriotic" dislike of "the illegal immigrant Mexicans", which he claimed Dorado to be a part of. During the course of the feud, Dorado scored a major upset victory over Chris Hero via submission with the Chikara Special. The feud culminated when Dorado defeated Ryder in November in a hair vs. mask match. However, their match gained some notoriety after Dorado suffered a seizure and severe concussion after he over-rotated a shooting star senton in the finish of the match that resulted in his head hitting the mat. Post-match, Dorado began suffering a seizure and was tended to by Chikara's founder Mike Quackenbush and Daizee Haze before he was unmasked (though a towel was placed over the top half of his face in order to conceal his identity) and subsequently taken away from the arena in an ambulance. In December, Dorado was released from the hospital and returned to Chikara that same month, where he distracted Ryder during his match with Tim Donst, allowing Donst to score an upset victory.

==== King of Trios and The Future is Now (2008–2009) ====
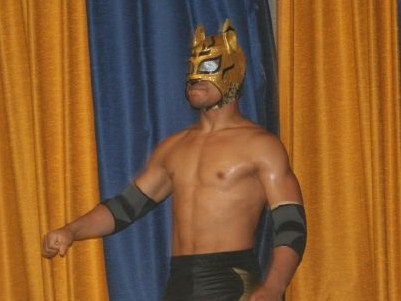
Dorado in 2008

Dorado would return to the ring in January, teaming with Claudio Castagnoli and Ophidian to defeat Mike Quackenbush, Tim Donst and Amasis in a Trios Increibles match. During the match, Dorado utilized a more grounded style of wrestling instead of his usual high flying style. Dorado then entered the King of Trios tournament, where he rejoined El Pantera and aligned with luchador Incognito to form Los Luchadores de Mexico. The team would go on to win the tournament, lastly defeating The BLKOUT (Eddie Kingston, Ruckus and Joker) after Dorado made Kingston submit with the Chikara Special. Following the tournament, Kingston was not seen for a couple of months afterwards. When Kingston returned, he immediately targeted Dorado and defeated him several times but was repeatedly unsuccessful in keeping him down, driving Kingston to the point of total insanity. Aside from his feud with Kingston, Dorado joined former enemy Jimmy Olsen (who, at the time, began competing as both himself and as the second Equinox) and Helios to form The Future is Now in order to feud with The UnStable (Vin Gerard (the first Equinox), STIGMA and Colin Delaney). In late 2008, Olsen (as Equinox) and Dorado won the first-ever La Lotería Letal and were thus granted the three points required to compete for the Campeonatos de Parejas. Olsen (as Equinox) and Dorado, challenged the champions The Osirian Portal at Chikara's "Armdrags to Riches" event on November 16, 2008, in a two out of three falls match. Although Dorado gained the first pinfall, the Portal ultimately retained the title after pinning Dorado and then Equinox. On November 22, 2009, at the season eight finale Three-Fisted Tales Dorado challenged Player Dos for the Young Lions Cup, but was defeated after Dos German suplexed him on the ring steps. After the match Dorado was carried backstage by Equinox and Helios in a scene reminiscent of the events of two years prior.

==== Bruderschaft des Kreuzes (2010–2011) ====
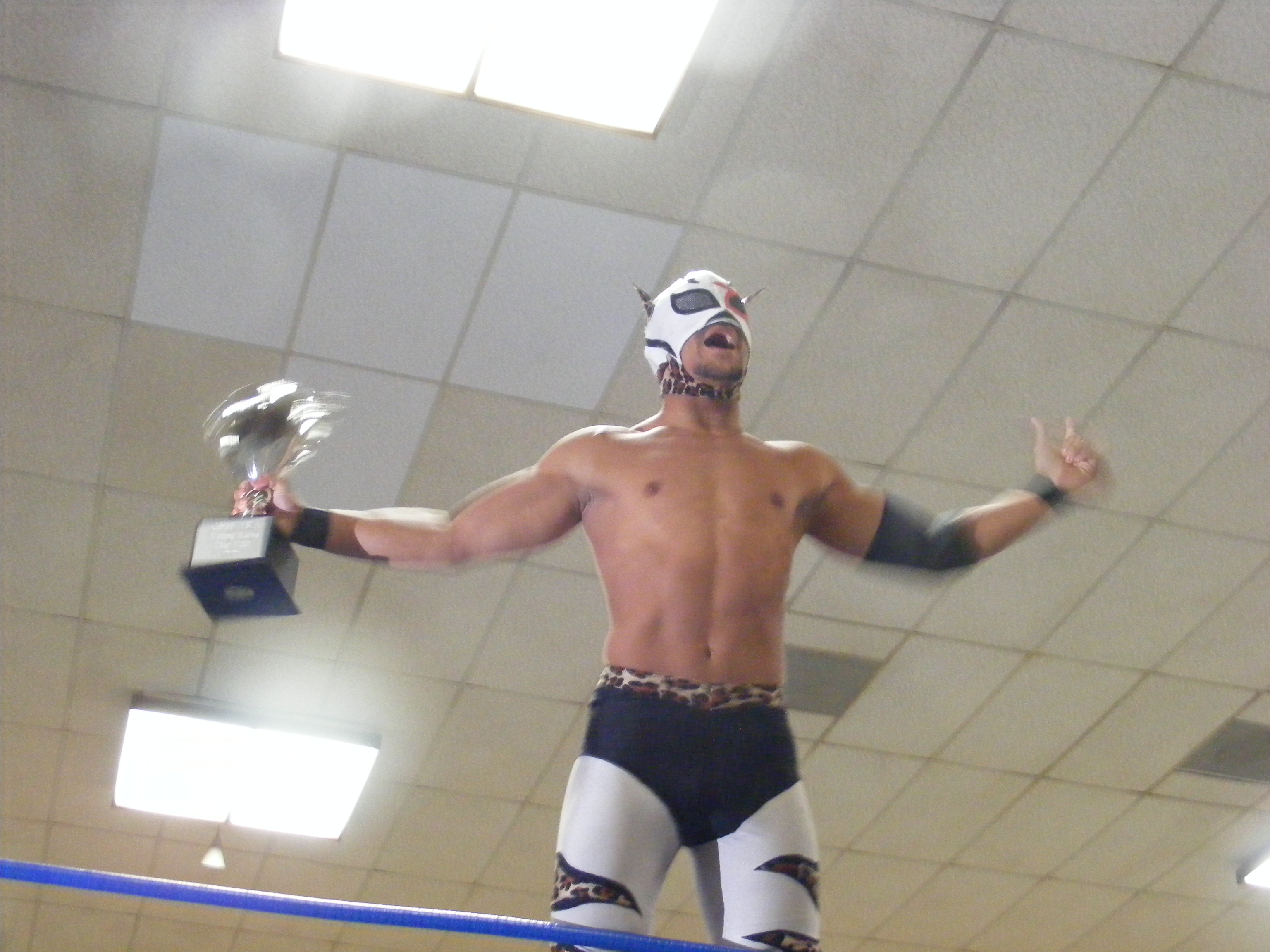
Dorado in his BDK attire, holding the Young Lions Cup, before he went on to lose it to Frightmare

On January 31, 2010, at the season nine premiere Dorado and Equinox were scheduled to be a part of Mike Quackenbush's team that was to battle the rudo stable Bruderschaft des Kreuzes (BDK). However, during the eight man tag team match Dorado turned on Equinox and joined BDK, who won the match, when Claudio Castagnoli pinned Dorado's replacement in Quackenbush's team, Eddie Kingston. Afterwards Dorado explained his turn by claiming that the Chikara audience never accepted him, despite his superior athleticism and his two serious injuries suffered inside the Chikara ring. On March 20 at Wit, Verve, and a Bit o' Nerve, Dorado, now sporting a new white and BDK-themed attire, defeated his former tag team partner Equinox in a singles match. On August 28, 2010, Dorado first defeated Gregory Iron in a singles match and then Adam Cole, Cameron Skyy, Keita Yano, Obariyon and Ophidian in a six-way elimination match to make it to the finals of the eighth annual Young Lions Cup tournament. The following day Dorado was defeated in the finals by Frightmare. In October 2010 Dorado made his first tour of Japan with Osaka Pro Wrestling. Dorado was advertised to take part in Chikara's shows on March 12 and 13, 2011, but ended up not appearing at the shows. Following the weekend, Dorado's profile was quietly removed from Chikara's website, confirming his departure from the promotion.

=== Independent circuit (2007–2016) ===
After making his Chikara debut, Dorado wrestled for many different promotions sporadically during his tenure with Chikara. In May 2008, Dorado would win the Independent Wrestling Revolution Revolucha Cup after defeating Josh Abercrombie in a two out of three falls final. Dorado made his debut for Dragon Gate USA at Open the Heroic Gate in a dark match where he defeated seven other wrestlers. On October 9, 2009, Dorado won the Sweet Sixteen Tournament at F1RST Wrestling, defeating three other men in the final. A month later he took part in the Open the Freedom Gate Championship tournament, losing to Gran Akuma in the first round. Dorado kicked of 2010 by losing to Rich Swann in a match for the vacant Real Championship Wrestling Cruiserweight Championship. On March 26, Dorado won the Garden State Pro Wrestling Championship by winning a tournament for the vacant title. In May, Dorado lost to Shiima Xion in the first round of the Super Indy IX for International Wrestling Cartel. Two months later, he would lose to Xion again but this time it was for the IWC Super Indy Championship. Dorado won the F1 Heritage Championship after winning a war games match, later vacating it after an 84-day reign. In December, Dorado debuted for Full Impact Pro, losing to Craig Classic in the first round of the Jeff Peterson Memorial Cup.

After leaving Chikara, Dorado would primarily wrestle for Vintage Wrestling, I Believe in Wrestling, Florida Underground Wrestling, IGNITE Wrestling and to a lesser extent Dragon Gate USA and its affiliates. Lince Dorado also started working for Dreamwave Wrestling in 2013. On March 14, 2014, Dorado defeated Gran Akuma at Full Impact Pro's Everything Burns and won the FIP Florida Heritage Championship.

On October 4, 2012, Dorado wrestled a tryout dark match for Total Nonstop Action Wrestling (TNA), facing Kazarian. On January 12, 2013, Dorado took part in the taping of X-Travaganza (aired on April 5, 2013), wrestling in a seven-man Xscape match, which was won by Christian York.

=== WWE (2016–2021) ===
==== Cruiserweight division (2016–2018) ====
On April 3, 2016, Dorado was announced as a participant in WWE's Cruiserweight Classic tournament. The tournament began on June 23 with Dorado defeating Mustafa Ali in his first round match. On July 14, Dorado was eliminated from the tournament by Rich Swann in his second round match. On July 22, it was reported that Dorado had signed a contract with WWE.

On September 16, Dorado was announced as part of Raw's cruiserweight division. Dorado made his debut on the September 21 episode of Main Event, losing to Rich Swann. On the September 26 episode of Raw, Dorado made his Raw debut, teaming with Drew Gulak in a losing effort to Cedric Alexander and Rich Swann. On October 30 at the Hell in a Cell, Dorado teamed with Cedric Alexander and Sin Cara to defeat Ariya Daivari, Drew Gulak, and Tony Nese. On December 13, Dorado made his 205 Live debut, wrestling Mustafa Ali to a double countout. On the June 26, 2017 episode of Raw, Dorado unsuccessfully challenged Cruiserweight Champion Neville. The following week, on the July 4 episode of 205 Live, Dorado once again lost to Neville.

==== Lucha House Party (2018–2021) ====
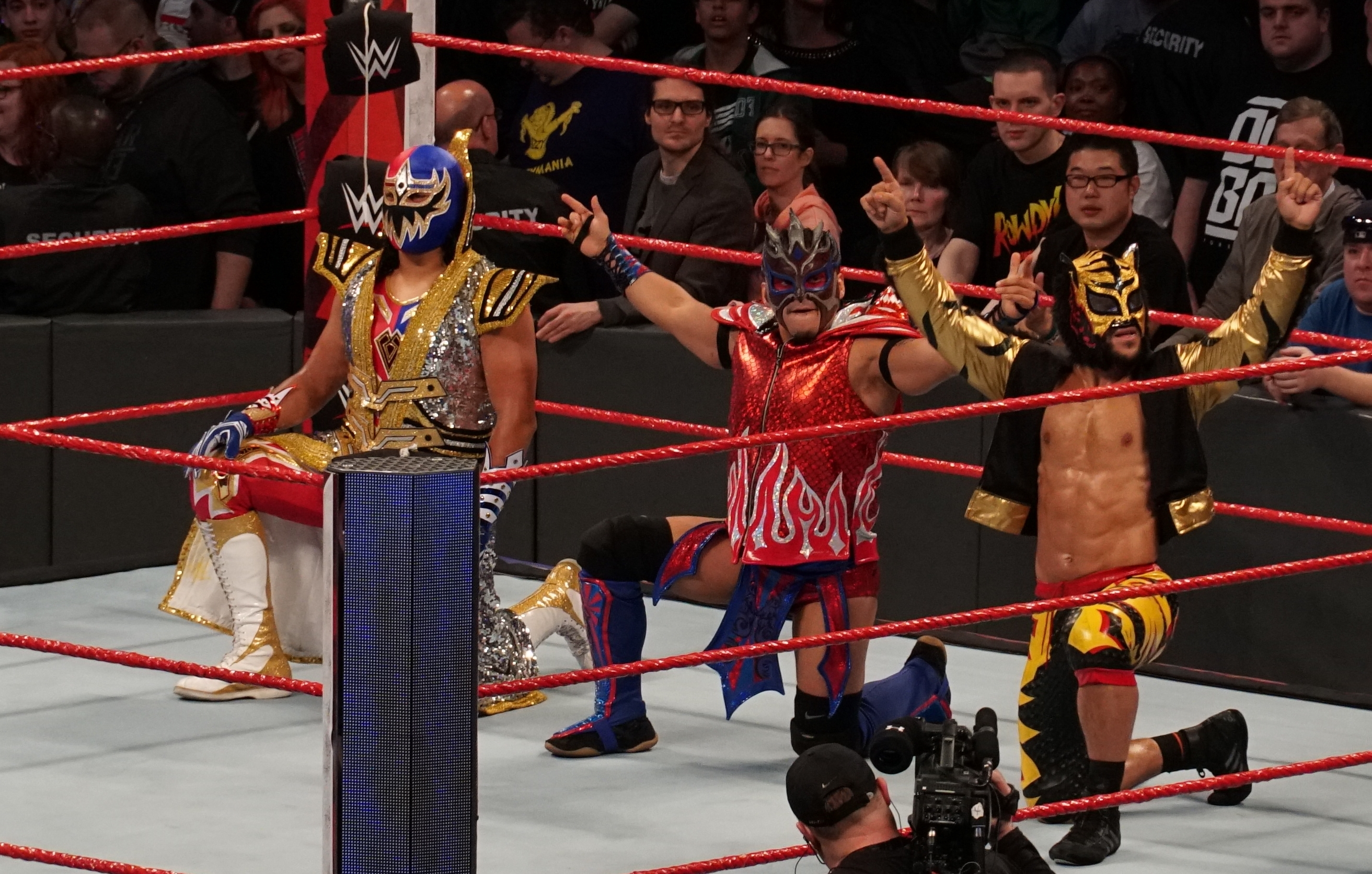
Lucha House Party - Dorado (right), Gran Metalik (left), and Kalisto (middle) in April 2018

In early 2018, Cordero pitched the idea of Lucha House Party, a trio of luchadores with Mexican stereotypes, so WWE decided to band together Dorado, Kalisto, and Gran Metalik. As part of their gimmick, the luchadors started to carry brightly colored noise makers and vuvuzela horns with them, using them to celebrate after a victory. They also carried a brightly colored Piñata donkey with them to the ring, which they referred to as "Penelope". Their first match as a full trio took place on January 23, 2018, episode of 205 Live, as they defeated Ariya Daivari, TJP, and Tony Nese. At the Royal Rumble, Lucha House Party defeated TJP, Drew Gulak, and Gentleman Jack Gallagher. The following week, WWE held a tournament for the vacant WWE Cruiserweight Championship, where Dorado was eliminated in the opening round by his stable partner, Kalisto.

On the November 12 episode of Raw, Lucha House Party competed against a number of non-Cruiserweight teams for the first time since WWE put them together, as they competed in a battle royal against Raw tag teams such as Bobby Roode and Chad Gable, The B-Team (Bo Dallas and Curtis Axel), Heath Slater and Rhyno, The Ascension (Konnor and Viktor), and The Revival (Dash Wilder and Scott Dawson). At the Survivor Series, Lucha House Party was part of Team Raw in a five on five team elimination match, that was won by Team SmackDown. In subsequent weeks, Lucha House Party was part of a storyline with The Revival, where the latter claimed to be "tag team purists" and as such objected to Lucha House Party being allowed to compete as a tag team when there was three of them. In the following weeks, Lucha House Party defeated The Revival in various three-on-two, or three-on-one matches billed as "Lucha House Rules" matches as part of the storyline. On the February 4, 2019 episode of Raw, The Revival finally defeated Lucha House Party as part of a fatal four-way match to earn a match for the WWE Raw Tag Team Championship at a later date. In June, Lucha House Party began a feud with Lars Sullivan, with the trio losing to Sullivan via disqualification in a three-on-one handicap match at Super ShowDown. The following night on Raw, Lucha House Party was again defeated by Sullivan, this time in a three-on-one handicap elimination match. On October 11, Lucha House Party was drafted to the SmackDown brand as part of the 2019 WWE Draft.

As part of the 2020 Draft in October, both Dorado and Metalik were drafted to the Raw brand, splitting them from Kalisto, who remained on the SmackDown brand. Dorado and Metalik appeared on NXT in 2021 to take part in the 2021 Dusty Rhodes Tag Team Classic. They eliminated Imperium in the first round, but were eliminated in the second round by Legado del Fantasma. On November 4, Dorado, along with Metalik were released from their WWE contracts.

=== Major League Wrestling (2022–2023) ===
On May 5, 2022, Dorado made his Major League Wrestling debut losing to Real1. On October 30, at Fightland, Dorado defeated Shun Skywalker to win the MLW World Middleweight Championship. On April 6, 2023 at War Chamber, Lince lost the title to Akira in a three-way match also involving Lio Rush.

=== Impact Wrestling (2023) ===
On March 20, 2023, Dorado was revealed as the challenger to Trey Miguel’s X Division Championship at Sacrifice. At the event, Dorado failed to win the title.

=== All Elite Wrestling (2023) ===
On October 4, 2023, Dorado made his All Elite Wrestling debut in a four-way match for the number one contendership of the ROH World Championship against Komander, Johnny TV and Penta El Zero Miedo; the match would be won by Komander. (Note: This match was broadcast on the October 6, 2023 episode of AEW Rampage.) He would wrestle for the company again on October 25, 2023, teaming in a dark match with Brandon Cutler and Colt Cabana in a losing effort to "QTV" (Aaron Solo, Johnny TV and QT Marshall).

=== Return to WWE (2025–present) ===
On January 17, 2025 Dorado returned at an NXT live event defeating Josh Black. He later revealed that he was signed in February as a wrestler and a trainer at the WWE Performance Center. Dorado made his WWE televised return on the May 28 episode of Evolve, where he lost a triple threat match qualifier for the fatal four-way elimination match to crown the inaugural Evolve Champion. On June 7 at the WWE and Lucha Libre Asistencia Asesoría y Administración (AAA) event Worlds Collide, Dorado teamed with LWO members Cruz Del Toro and Dragon Lee (and replacing the injured Joaquin Wilde) in a losing effort against Octagón Jr., Aero Star and Mr. Iguana in a six-man tag team match.

== Other media ==
Lince Dorado made his video game debut as a playable character in WWE 2K19 and has since appeared in WWE 2K20 and WWE 2K22.

== Championships and accomplishments ==
- Championship Wrestling Entertainment
  - CWE Tag Team Championship (1 time) – with Jon Cruz
- Chikara
  - King of Trios (2008) – with El Pantera and Incognito
  - La Lotería Letal – with Jimmy Olsen
- Demand Lucha
  - Lucha Premier Championship (1 time)
- Dreamwave Wrestling
  - Dreamwave Alternative Championship (1 time)
- F1RST Wrestling
  - Sweet Sixteen Tournament (2009)
- Force One Pro Wrestling
  - F1 Heritage Championship (1 time)
- Full Impact Pro
  - FIP Florida Heritage Championship (1 time)
- Future of Wrestling
  - FOW International Championship (1 time)
- Garden State Pro Wrestling
  - GSPW Championship (1 time, inaugural, final)
  - GSPW Championship Tournament (2010)
- Major League Wrestling
  - MLW World Middleweight Championship (1 time)
- NWA Florida Underground Wrestling
  - NWA FUW Flash Championship (1 time)
- Independent Wrestling Revolution
  - Revolucha Cup (2008)
- Pro Wrestling Illustrated
  - Ranked No. 233 of the top 500 singles wrestlers in the PWI 500 in 2017
  - Ranked No. 174 of the top 500 singles wrestlers in the PWI 500 in 2019
- RIOT Pro Wrestling
  - RIOT Tag Team Championship (1 time) – with Aaron Epic
- Southern Championship Wrestling Florida
  - SCW Florida Heavyweight Championship (1 time)
  - SCW Florida Cruiserweight Championship (1 time)
  - SCW Florida Cruiserweight Championship Tournament (2011)
- Saudi Pro Wrestling
  - SPW Tag Team Championship (1 time) – with Samuray del Sol
- The Wrestling Revolver
  - Revolver Remix Championship (1 time)
  - Revolver World Tag Team Championship (1 time) – with Samuray del Sol
- WWE
  - WWE 24/7 Championship (1 time)
- Other championships
  - Team HAMMA FIST Championship (1 time)

== Luchas de Apuestas record ==
Winner (wager)	Loser (wager)	Location	Event	Date	Notes
Lince Dorado (mask)	Mitch Ryder (hair)	Philadelphia, Pennsylvania	Chapter 11	November 18, 2007	
Lince Dorado (title)	Aiden Altair (mask)	Orlando, Florida	Live event	April 7, 2012	(Note: Dorado's SCW Florida Cruiserweight Championship was on the line.)
Lince Dorado (mask)	Chasyn Rance (hair)	Orlando, Florida	With Malice	October 12, 2013	

== See also ==
- Professional wrestling in Puerto Rico
