= Jimmy Olsen (wrestler) =

American former professional wrestler (born 1986)

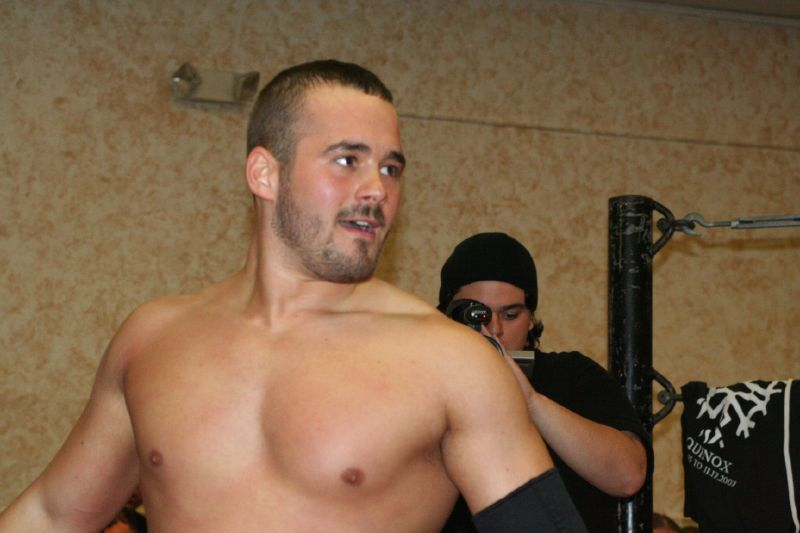
- Olsen in May 2008

Personal information
- Born: October 16, 1986 (age 39) Rochester, New York

Professional wrestling career
- Ring name(s): Jimmy Olsen; Equinox
- Billed height: 5 ft 7 in (1.70 m)
- Billed weight: 172 lb (78 kg)
- Billed from: San Francisco, California (as Jimmy Olsen)
- Debut: February 3, 2002
- Retired: December 23, 2011

Jimmy Olsen (born October 16, 1986) is an American former professional wrestler. He is best known for his tenure in Chikara, under his real name and the ring name Equinox.

== Professional wrestling career ==
=== Chikara (2006–2010) ===
Jimmy Olsen made his Chikara debut on November 12, 2006, alongside Colin Olsen as the Olsen Twins at a tag team tournament to decide new number one contenders to the Chikara Campeonatos de Parejas, but the two lost in the opening round to Cheech and Cloudy. This performance would however earn them a regular spot on the Chikara roster.

The Olsens returned in February 2007 during the King of Trios weekend in a match, where they were brutalized at the hands of Yoshiaki Yago and MIYAWAKI. They achieved their first Chikara win during a gauntlet match on night three of that weekend by beating 2.0 (Jagged and Shane Matthews) in 4 seconds. Unfortunately, this would prove to be one of their only wins, with another coming during the Young Lions Cup weekend in June when they upset the North Star Express (Darin Corbin and Ryan Cruz). They would begin occasionally teaming with NWA Upstate colleague Brodie Lee in trios matches, often tackling The Colony, and their adventures in tag team wrestling saw even more enthralling contests with Cheech and Cloudy, including a widely praised match at the "Cibernetico and Robin" event in September 2007.

Colin's signing with World Wrestling Entertainment in early 2008 forced Jimmy into full-time singles wrestling, which he proved to be rather good at, defeating the likes of Icarus and Player Uno, while taking Vin Gerard and Gran Akuma to the limit. However, a first round loss to Stupefied in the Young Lions Cup and Vin Gerard revealing where Colin had really gone caused Jimmy to turn against the fans who had grown to love him as he began to unmask several wrestlers, seemingly hunting for Colin. However, when Colin returned in September, Jimmy declared his hunt for Colin to be over, and thus ending his grudge against any masked wrestlers. This did not end well though as Colin determined that Jimmy had become weak, and as a result Colin turned on his brother and joined Vin Gerard and STIGMA to form the UnStable. Now firmly back in the tecnico camp, Jimmy looked to gain adequate revenge on the rudos, who tricked him and betrayed him. He formed a successful tag team with former foe Lince Dorado, and in late 2008 began donning the old Equinox attire, worn originally by Vin Gerard, in an effective attempt to get into his head.

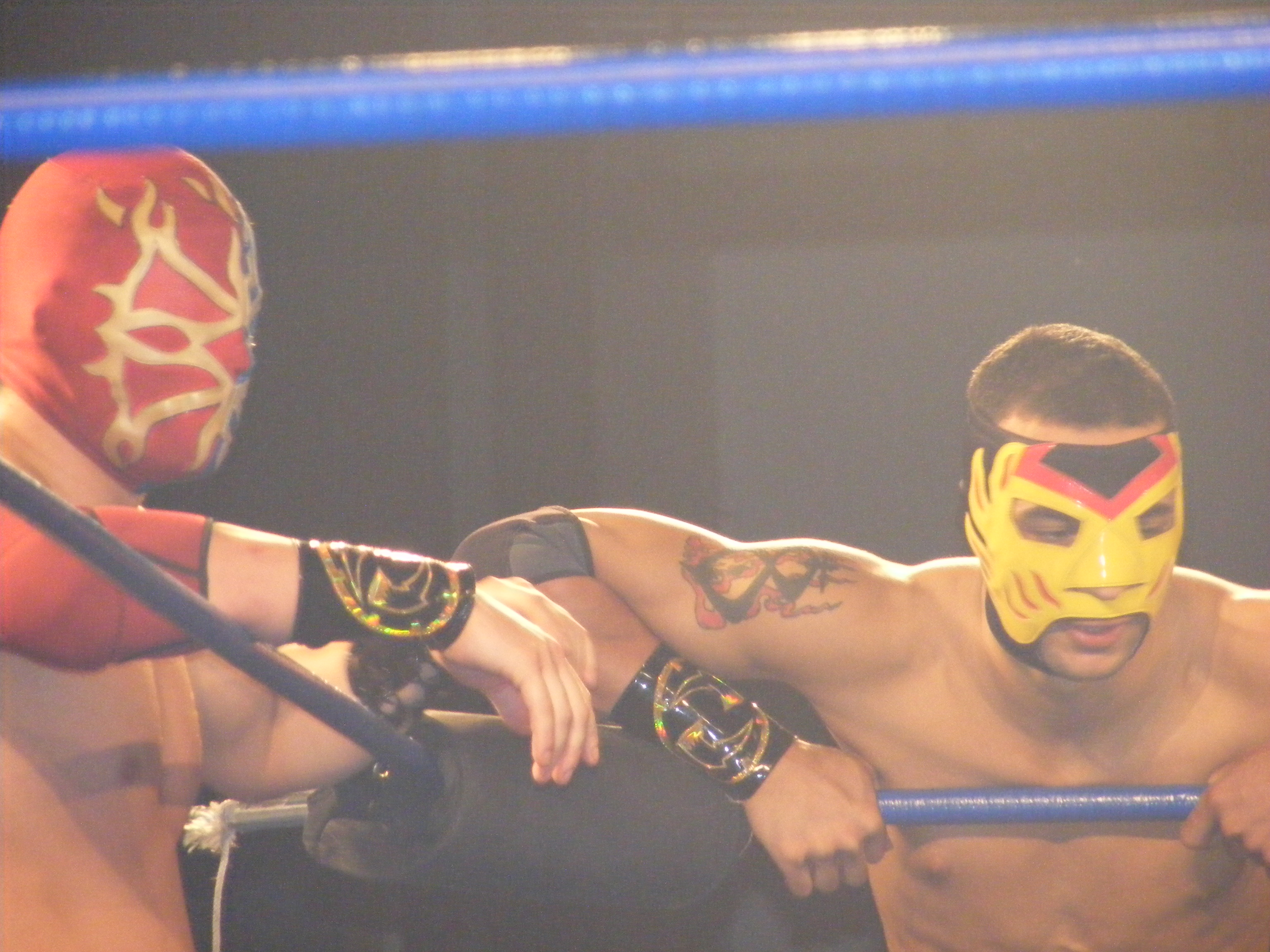
Equinox (left) with Helios in April 2010

The year began with the formal announcement of Olsen, Dorado and Helios as a full-time unit in Chikara, dubbed The Future Is Now. Things got even better for Olsen when on January 25, 2009, he finally defeated Vin Gerard, this time in a ladder match, to become the new Chikara Young Lions Cup Champion. He opted to remain wrestling as Equinox in Chikara, due to the success the mask had brought him. On March 14, 2009, in Binghamton, New York, Jimmy Olsen defeated Slyck Wagner Brown and "Main Event" Jason Axe inside a steel cage to become the 2CW Heavyweight Champion. Olsen suffered a broken foot in May 2009 that kept him out of the ring. He lost the 2CW Title to Jason Axe on June 5. Olsen held the Young Lions Cup until August 2009, when he had to vacate it for the seventh annual Young Lions Cup tournament. On January 31, 2010, Equinox and Dorado joined forces with Mike Quackenbush and Jigsaw in an eight-man tag team match against Bruderschaft des Kreuzes (Claudio Castagnoli, Ares, Tursas and a mystery partner). However, during the match Dorado turned on Equinox and revealed himself as the mystery member of BDK, who wound up winning the match, when Castagnoli pinned Dorado's replacement in Quackenbush's team, Eddie Kingston. On March 20 at Wit, Verve, and a Bit o' Nerve Olsen was defeated by Dorado in a singles match. In May 2010, during the Aniversario weekend, Equinox and Helios first defeated Dorado and his BDK teammate Tim Donst in a tag team match and then won a four-team elimination match to earn the three points needed in order to challenge for the Campeonatos de Parejas. Equinox and Helios received their title shot on June 27 at Faded Scars and Lines, but were defeated by the defending champions BDK (Ares and Claudio Castagnoli) in two straight falls after a pre–match assault.

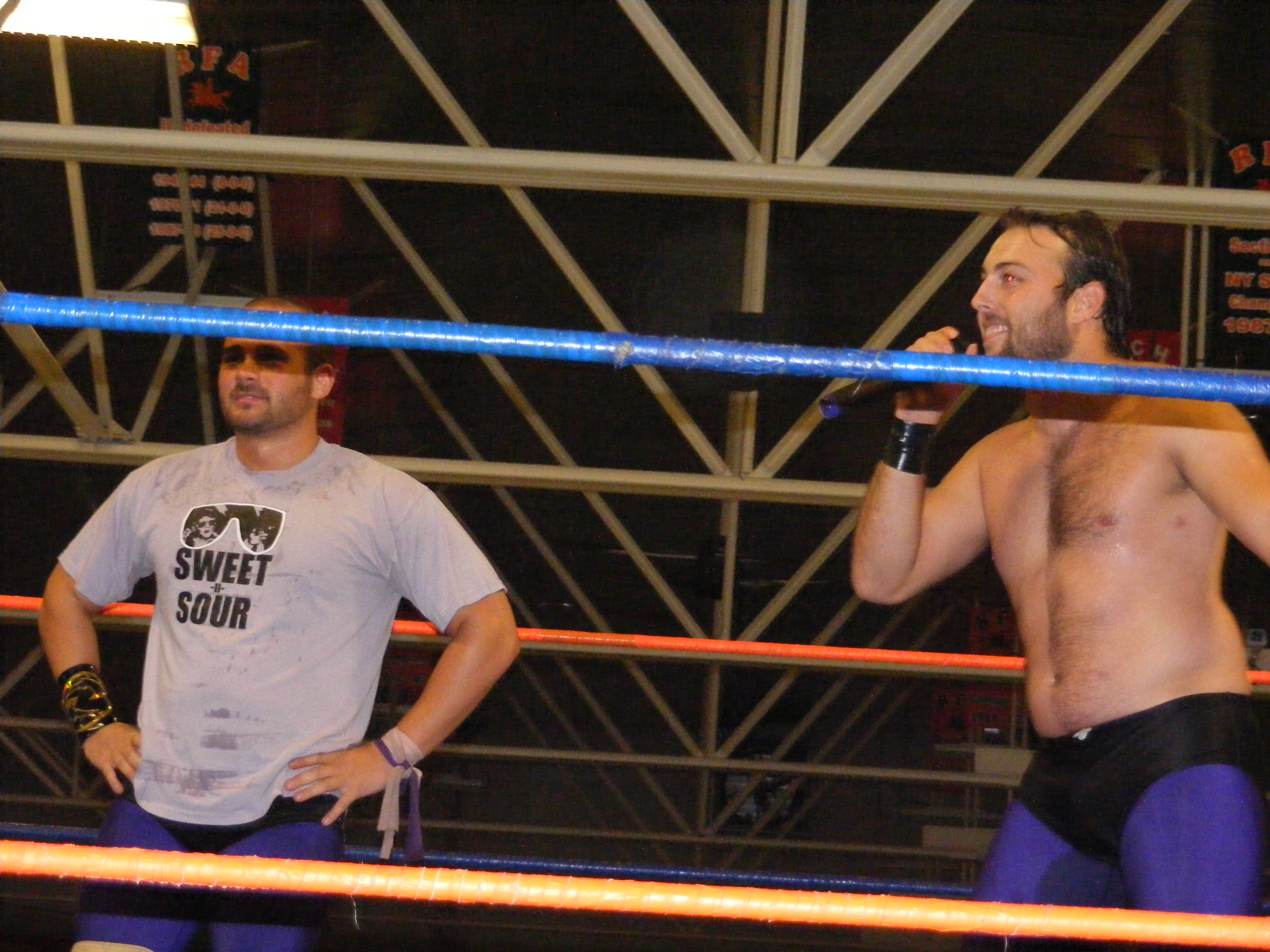
Jimmy (left) and Colin Olsen in 2011

On September 19, 2010, at Through Savage Progress Cuts the Jungle Line Equinox, Helios and Jigsaw faced the UnStable in a six-man tag team match. During the match Colin Delaney turned on Vin Gerard and STIGMA, after which Gerard got his team disqualified by low blowing the former Olsen Twins. After the match Olsen and Delaney re–formed their tag team, with Olsen dropping the Equinox gimmick during a post–match hug with Delaney. On October 24, in the first match between the Olsen Twins and the UnStable, Vin Gerard picked up the victory for his team by forcing Delaney Olsen to submit. The two teams had a rematch on November 21, this time with the Olsen Twins coming out victorious.

=== Retirement (2011–2012) ===
After losing to Colin on December 23, 2011, in a singles match for Absolute Intense Wrestling, Olsen retired from professional wrestling. However, he returned to the ring on April 13, 2012, and reformed the Olsen Twins with Colin in a losing effort to The Briscoe Brothers in a match for Squared Circle Wrestling. The following day, Olsen lost to Colin and subsequently returned to retirement.

== Championships and accomplishments ==
- Absolute Intense Wrestling
  - AIW Tag Team Championship (1 time) –with Colin Delaney
- Chikara
  - Young Lions Cup VI (1 time)
  - Torneo Cibernetico (2008)
  - La Lotería Letal (2008) – with Lince Dorado
- NWA Upstate
  - NWA Upstate Heavyweight Championship (2 times)
  - NWA Upstate Tag Team Championship (2 times) – with Colin Olsen (1) and Jake 'n' Bake (1)
  - Upstate 8 Invitational (2008)
- Pro Wrestling Illustrated
  - PWI ranked #442 of the top 500 singles wrestlers in the PWI 500 in 2009
- Roc City Wrestling
  - RCW Tag Team Championship (1 time) – with Colin Olsen
- Squared Circle Wrestling
  - 2CW Heavyweight Championship (1 time)
  - 2CW Tag Team Championship (1 time) – with Colin Delaney
