= Stigma (wrestler) =

American professional wrestler

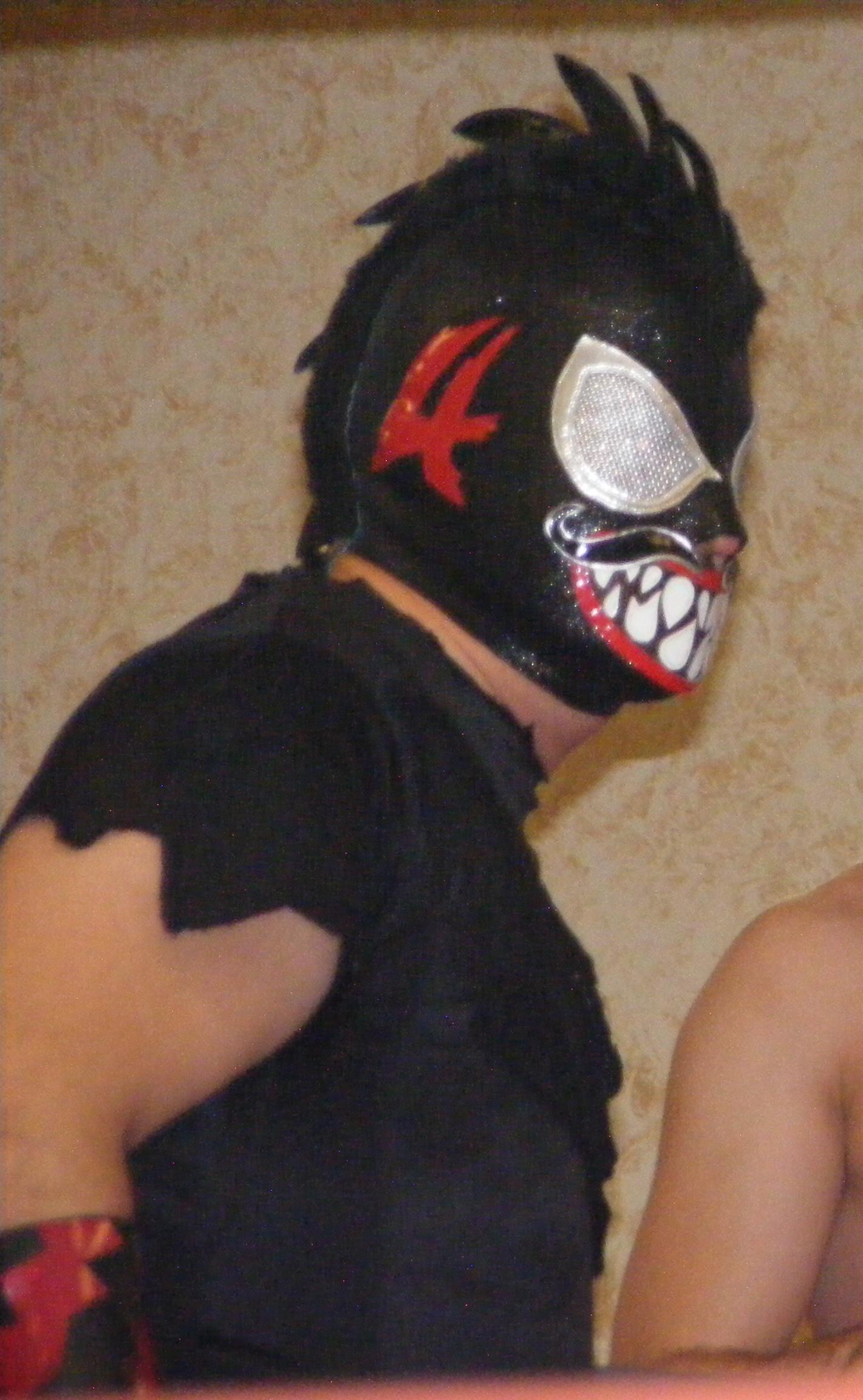
- Stigma in November 2008

Personal information
- Born: Wilkes Barre, Pennsylvania

Professional wrestling career
- Ring name(s): Shane Harttt; Shane Storm; Stigma
- Billed height: 5 ft 10 in (1.78 m)
- Billed weight: 216 lb (98 kg)
- Trained by: Mike Quackenbush; Chris Hero; Jorge "Skayde" Rivera
- Debut: December 10, 2003

Stigma (stylized as STIGMA) is an American professional wrestler, best known for his work in the Chikara professional wrestling promotion, where he is a former Young Lions Cup Champion and King of Trios winner. He was previously known as Shane Storm and has also wrestled for other independent promotions such as Combat Zone Wrestling, Full Impact Pro and Independent Wrestling Association Mid-South.

== Professional wrestling career ==
Stigma received his initial training from Chikara founder Mike Quackenbush at the Chikara Wrestle Factory, where he was trained on the fourth term of the school. He was later also trained by Chris Hero and Jorge "Skayde" Rivera, who joined the school in the following terms.

=== Chikara ===
==== Men@Work (2004–2005) ====
On March 20, 2004, he made his Chikara debut as a tecnico (good guy) named Shane Storm, wearing a clown mask with either a red, yellow or blue mullet and the gimmick of a traffic regulator, teaming with Private Eye in a tag team match, where they defeated Darkness Crabtree and Phantasmo. At the following show on April 9 Storm scored a major upset by defeating Young Lions Cup Champion Hallowicked in a non-title match to earn his spot in the second Young Lions Cup tournament. Storm entered the tournament on July 10 by defeating Ash, but was eliminated the following day in the quarterfinals, when Larry Sweeney pinned him and grabbed a hold of his tights for leverage. After the tournament Storm formed the tag team Men@Work with Mister Zero and together the two took part in Chikara's feud with Sweeney's stable Sweet 'n' Sour International. The feud culminated on October 30 in the first ever torneo cibernetico match, where Chikara defeated Sweeney's stable.

On February 19, 2005, Men@Work entered the 2005 Tag World Grand Prix, defeating Sweeney and Share Cropper in their first round match. However, later that same day Storm and Zero were eliminated from the tournament by Necro Butcher and Mad Man Pondo. On March 18 Men@Work fought Team F.I.S.T. (Gran Akuma and Icarus) to a fifteen-minute time limit draw, which led to a rematch on April 15, which ended in a 22-minute time limit draw. On May 20 at Aniversario Blue Men@Work faced Team F.I.S.T. for the third time and this time Storm managed to score the pinfall on Icarus in less than five minutes. After the match Icarus and Akuma stormed out of the ring, refusing to shake hands with Storm and Zero, only to return during the intermission and turn rudo (villain) by attacking them. Icarus' attack on Zero left him sidelined for months and forced Storm to become a singles competitor.

==== Young Lions Cup (2005) ====
On June 17, 2005, Storm defeated Gran Akuma to qualify for the third Young Lions Cup tournament. On July 23 Storm defeated Vries Kastelein in the first round of the tournament and later that day Claudio Castagnoli, Crossbones, Kudo, Niles Young and Equinox to advance to the finals the following day, where was able to avenge his fallen partner by defeating Icarus and becoming the fourth Young Lions Cup Champion. After the tournament Storm aligned himself with Mike Quackenbush and Jigsaw in their battle with The Kings of Wrestling (Chris Hero, Claudio Castagnoli, Icarus and Gran Akuma). On September 16 Storm successfully defended his title against Icarus in a rematch. On October 22 Storm entered the second ever torneo cibernetico, where, after lasting 104 minutes, he was the last man eliminated by the winner of the match, Gran Akuma. Mister Zero made his return in the match, but was eliminated by Icarus. After the match Storm challenged Akuma to a Mask vs. Mask match, which Chris Hero accepted on his protégé's behalf. On November 13 Storm defeated Akuma, who was then as a result, forced to unmask.

==== ShaneSaw and King of Trios (2006–2007) ====
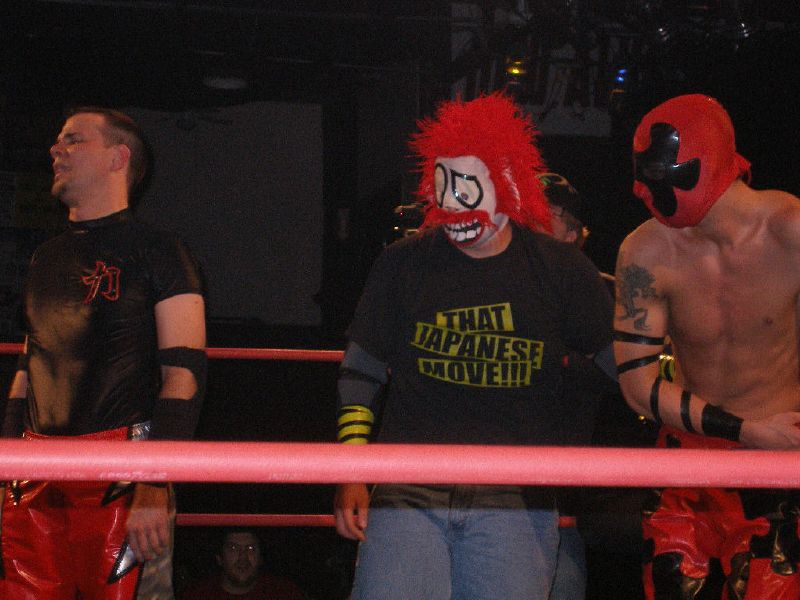
(From left to right) Mike Quackenbush, Shane Storm and Jigsaw

On February 25, 2006, Men@Work reunited for the 2006 Tag World Grand Prix. After defeating 2.0 (Jagged and Shane Matthews) in the first round of the tournament, Men@Work once again faced off with Team F.I.S.T. in the second round. During the match Icarus once again injured Mister Zero, after which Akuma pinned Storm with the Yoshi Tonic. With Mister Zero being forced into retirement, Storm went on to form the tag team ShaneSaw with Jigsaw and spent the rest of the year feuding with the Kings of Wrestling. After two successful defenses, Storm was forced to vacate the Young Lions Cup on June 25, 2006, for the fourth Young Lions Cup tournament. On February 17, 2007, Storm, Jigsaw and Mike Quackenbush entered the first ever King of Trios tournament, defeating Team IWS (Jagged, Maxime Boyer and Shane Matthews) in the first and Team TNA (Alex Shelley, Chris Sabin and Sonjay Dutt) in the second round of the tournament. The following day Storm, Jigsaw and Quackenbush defeated Team Mucha Lucha (Lince Dorado, El Pantera and Sicodelico Jr.) first in the semifinals and then Team Kaientai Dojo (Kudo, MIYAWAKI and Yoshiaki Yago) in the finals to become the first ever Kings of Trios. After picking up the three points (three straight victories) needed in order to challenge for the Campeonatos de Parejas, Storm and Jigsaw challenged the champions, Icarus and Gran Akuma, on March 23, but were defeated. Storm and Jigsaw then went on a losing streak, which led to the two deciding to split up.

==== Tecnico traitor (2007–2008) ====
On May 26, 2007, Mike Quackenbush defeated Chris Hero in a match years in the making, with a new submission maneuver, named the Chikara Special. After the match Quackenbush announced that he would teach the move to every tecnico on the Chikara roster, because he knew Hero would never be able to break the hold. On November 17 Storm's long losing streak came to an end, when UltraMantis Black inexplicably helped him defeat his own protégé, Hydra, in a single match. That same night Hero managed to break the Chikara Special in his Hair vs. Mask match against Equinox and then use the move himself to win the match. In early 2008 Storm and Quackenbush began teaming together and quickly picked up three points. However, immediately after picking up their third point in a match against the Super Smash Bros. (Player Uno and Stupefied) on June 14, UltraMantis Black's stable mate Tim Donst came to ringside and whispered something into Quackenbush's ear, after which he assaulted Storm. The following day Quackenbush revealed that he had sent Donst into UltraMantis' the Order of the Neo–Solar Temple to find out which one of the tecnicos had leaked the Chikara Special to Chris Hero. Undercover, Donst had learned that Storm had leaked the move and in exchange UltraMantis helped him end his losing streak. Even though, Storm and Quackenbush had earned the right to challenge for the Campeonatos de Parejas, Quackenbush declared their team dead and vowed to get revenge on Storm.

Storm's and Quackenbush's first match against each other on July 13 originally ended in Quackenbush's submission victory, but in the end the decision was reversed, when he refused to release the Chikara Special on Storm. When everyone else turned on Storm, brand new Young Lions Cup Champion Vin Gerard, who had wrestled as Equinox prior to his unmasking at the hands of Hero and who had also been thrown out of the Chikara locker room, when it was revealed upon his unmasking that he was no luchador, came to Storm and suggested an alliance between the two outcasts. On August 9 Storm defeated Quackenbush in a rematch, after Gerard interfered in the match and hit Quackenbush with a low blow and the Young Lions Cup. The following night Storm finalized his rudo turn by helping Gerard retain the Young Lions Cup in a match against Drake Younger. After the event Storm renamed himself Stigma and adopted a new darker mask and attire, a more physical wrestling style and a new finisher, tombstone piledriver.

==== The UnStable (2008–2011) ====
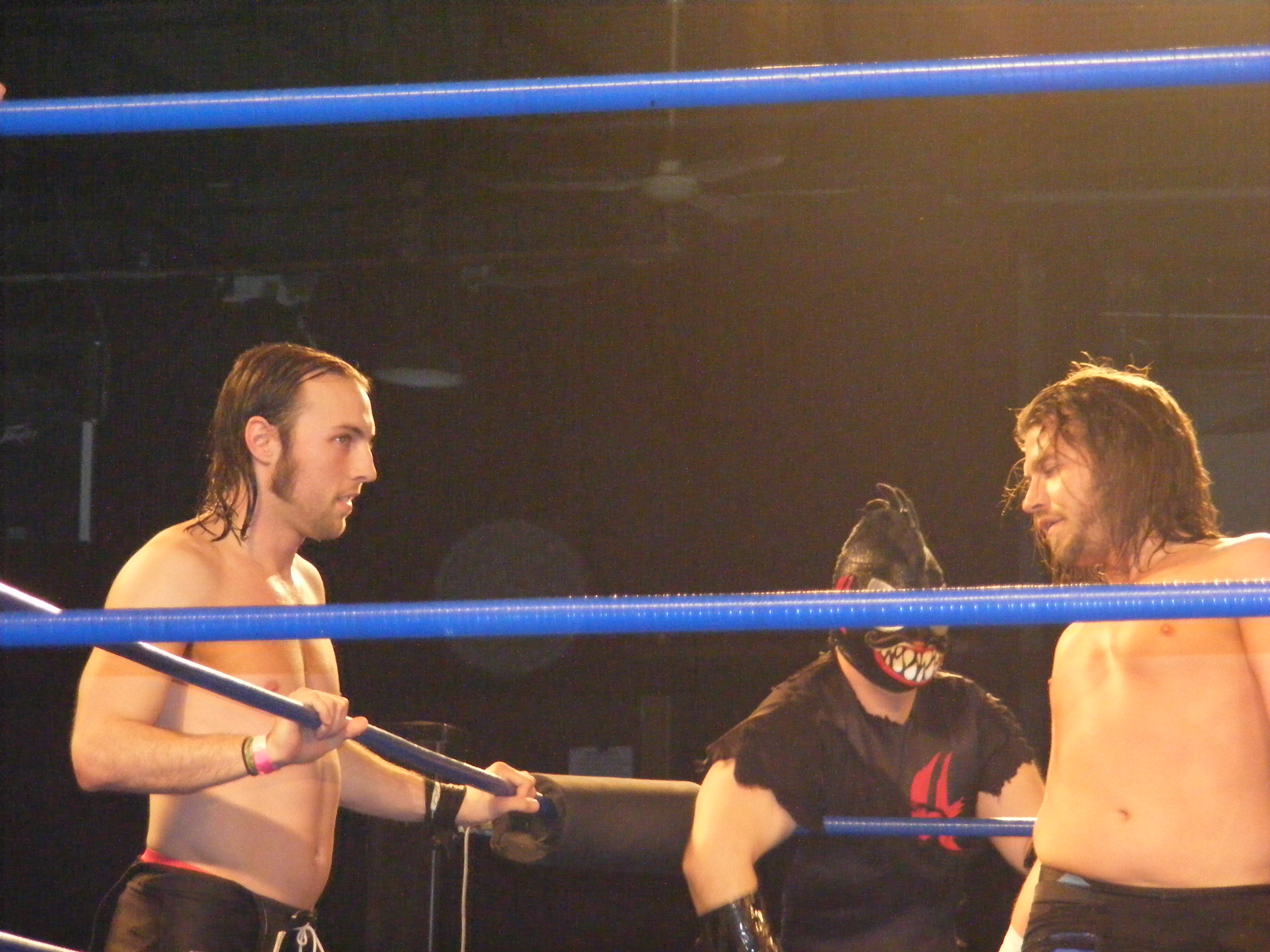
(From left to right) Colin Delaney, Stigma and Vin Gerard; The UnStable

On September 7 Colin Delaney, who had recently returned from his stint with World Wrestling Entertainment, turned on his partner Jimmy Olsen and joined Stigma and Gerard to form the UnStable. In the 2008 Tag World Grand Prix Stigma and Gerard made it to the semifinals, before losing to The Colony (Fire Ant and Soldier Ant). The fifth annual torneo cibernetico was built around the UnStable's feud with Chikara's tecnicos, with Team Gerard facing Team Equinox, with Equinox now being portrayed by Jimmy Olsen. Stigma managed to eliminate Hydra, Worker Ant and Quackenbush from the match, before being pinned by Fire Ant. The year ended on December 14 in a tag team match, where Stigma and Delaney faced Quackenbush and Tim Donst. After Donst was forced off the match with an injury at the hands of the UnStable, Jigsaw, who had left Chikara in November 2007 and returned without his mask in September 2008, came to the ring with his mask on and pinned Stigma with the Jig 'n' Tonic to win the match.

On March 27, 2009, the UnStable entered the 2009 King of Trios tournament, defeating the Cold Front 2.0 (Al Snow, D'Lo Brown and Glacier) in the first round. The following day the UnStable defeated Da Soul Touchaz (Marshe Rockett, Trauma and Willie Richardson) to advance to the following day's semifinals, where they were defeated by Team Uppercut (Bryan Danielson, Claudio Castagnoli and Dave Taylor). In the latter half of 2009 the UnStable started a long losing streak, which included a first round loss in the 2010 King of Trios, during which Stigma and Gerard began showing signs of a tecnico turn by making sure that Amasis was fine after their match against him and Ophidian on March 20, 2010. Gerard faced Amasis again, this time in a singles match, on May 23 and managed to score his first victory in six months only to learn later that Colin Delaney had interfered in the match. In a blog entry on Chikara's official website Gerard attacked Delaney, calling him selfish and warned him not to interfere in his and Stigma's deciding match against The Osirian Portal on June 27. On June 27 at Faded Scars and Lines Delaney interfered in the match and helped Stigma and Gerard defeat the Osirian Portal. After teasing dissension, all three members of the UnStable united and attacked Amasis and Ophidian. On July 26 at Chikarasaurus Rex: King of Show, the Osirian Portal teamed with the returning Drake Younger, who hadn't forgotten what Gerard and Stigma did to him in August 2008, and together the three of them gained a measure of revenge on the UnStable by defeating them in a six-man tag team match. Even though the UnStable had seemingly reunited, tension rose again during the Young Lions Cup VIII weekend, when Delaney eliminated Stigma from a 30 Man Countdown Showdown match. On September 10 UltraMantis Black announced that he had recruited Stigma to be a part of his team of Chikara originals for the seventh annual torneo cibernetico match on October 23, where they would face the rudo stable Bruderschaft des Kreuzes. On September 19, 2010, at Through Savage Progress Cuts the Jungle Line the UnStable faced the Future is Now (Equinox, Helios and Jigsaw) in a six-man tag team match. During the match Delaney turned on the UnStable and re–formed his tag team with Olsen, after which Gerard got his team disqualified by low blowing the former Olsen Twins. On October 23, Stigma represented Chikara in the torneo cibernetico match and entered the match wearing his old Shane Storm mask. He was eliminated from the match by BDK's Tim Donst. The following day, in the first match between the UnStable and the Olsen Twins, Vin Gerard picked up the victory for his team by forcing Delaney Olsen to submit. The following week Stigma and Gerard made their first tour of Japan with Osaka Pro Wrestling. The UnStable had a rematch with the Olsen Twins on November 21, this time with the Olsens coming out victorious. In February 2011, the UnStable began feuding with 3.0 (Scott "Jagged" Parker and Shane Matthews). The feud ended on May 21, when 3.0 defeated the UnStable in a tag team match, where the losing team had to split up. Following this match, Stigma was not seen in Chikara for nearly a year, with his profile being quietly removed from the promotion's official website.

==== Sporadic appearances (2012–present) ====
On May 19, 2012, Shane Storm returned to Chikara during the promotion's tenth anniversary weekend, teaming with fellow Chikara alumni Crossbones, Jolly Roger, Lance Steel and Rorschach in a ten-man tag team match, where they were defeated by Jakob Hammermeier, Kobald, Kodama, Obariyon and Tim Donst. Working again as Stigma, he also wrestled at Wrestling is Fun!'s–Chikara's sister promotion–"free-per-view" on October 27, losing to UltraMantis Black. On February 8, 2015, Storm returned to take part in the third annual National Pro Wrestling Day, teaming with Amasis, Argus, Dasher Hatfield, Fire Ant, Jervis Cottonbelly, Marion Fontaine, Mark Angelosetti, Ophidian and Worker Ant in a twenty-man main event tag team match, where they defeated Blaster McMassive, El Hijo del Ice Cream, Ice Cream Jr., Juan Francisco de Coronado, Max Smashmaster, Mr. Azerbaijan, Oleg the Usurper, Prakash Sabar, Proletariat Boar of Moldova and Shayne Hawke. On May 7, 2016, Storm took part in Chikara's Infinite Gauntlet match, from which he was the first wrestler eliminated by Lucas Calhoun, Missile Assault Man and Wani.

== Championships and accomplishments ==
- Chikara
  - Young Lions Cup III
  - King of Trios (2007) – with Jigsaw and Mike Quackenbush
- Grand Slam Wrestling
  - GSW Tag Team Championship (1 time) – with Bo Nekoda

=== Luchas de Apuestas record ===
Winner (wager)	Loser (wager)	Location	Event	Date	Notes
Shane Storm (mask)	Gran Akuma (mask)	Philadelphia, Pennsylvania	Running in the Red	November 13, 2005	
