= Colin Delaney =

American professional wrestler

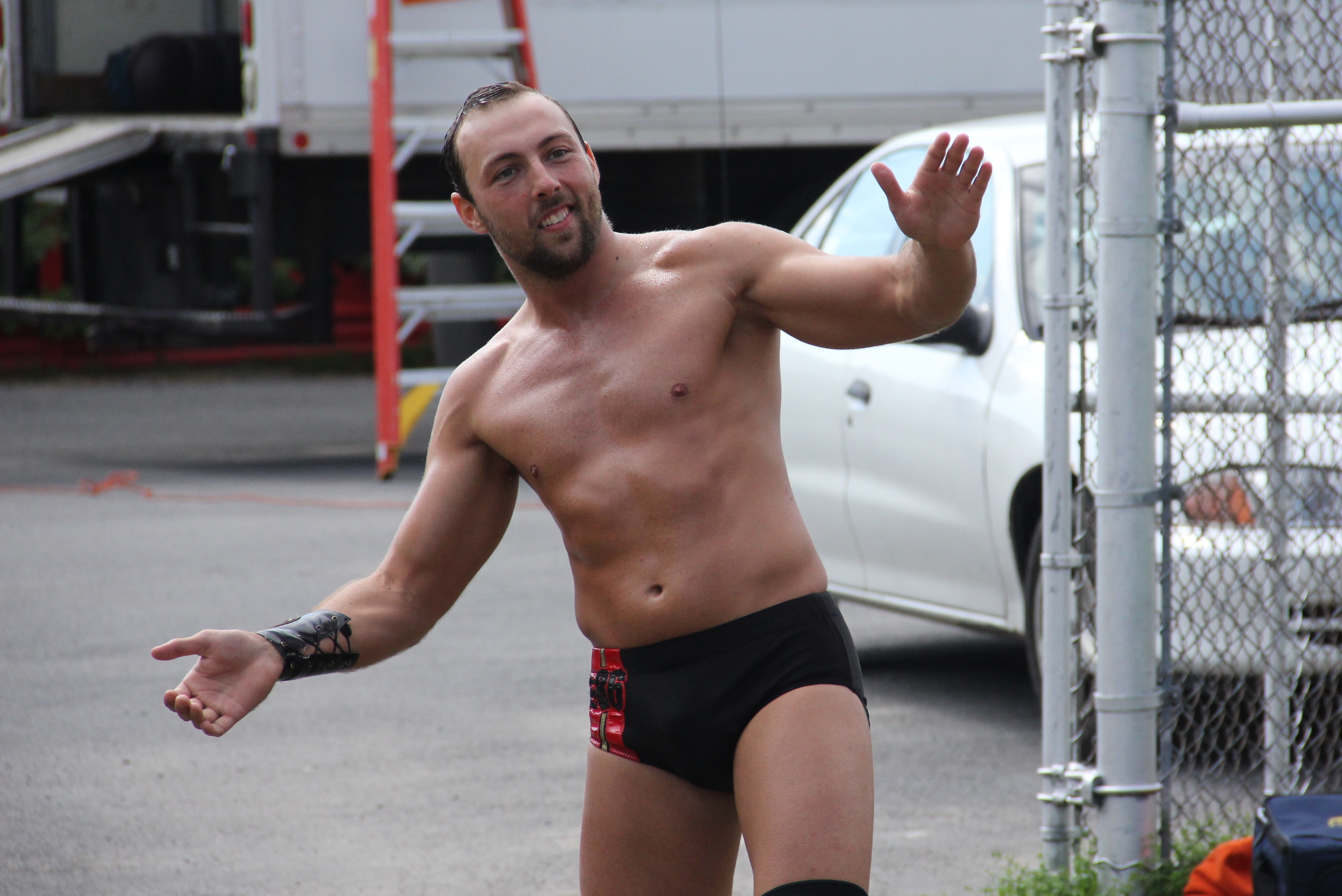
- Delaney in 2013

Personal information
- Born: Colin Matthew Delaney; September 7, 1986 (age 40) Rochester, New York, U.S.

Professional wrestling career
- Ring name(s): Colin Delaney; Colin Delaney Olsen; Colin Olsen
- Billed height: 5 ft 9 in (1.75 m)
- Billed weight: 172 lb (78 kg)
- Billed from: Rochester, New York
- Trained by: NWA Upstate
- Debut: December 13, 2003

Colin Matthew Delaney (born September 7, 1986) is an American professional wrestler. He currently performs on the independent circuit. He is best known for his time with WWE on its ECW brand. He is also known for his tenures with Chikara and International Wrestling Cartel (IWC).

== Professional wrestling career ==
=== Independent circuit (2003–2007) ===
Delaney first started as a commentator for Rochester, New York, promotion Roc City Wrestling. He soon moved to their competitor, Rochester Pro Wrestling, where he trained as a wrestler by Rik Matrix and ROH's Ring Crew Express. Since then he has worked for NWA Empire, NWA Upstate, Chikara, UWA Hardcore Wrestling in Canada, Squared Circle Wrestling, Buffalo Championship Wrestling, Roc City Wrestling, and CZW promotions under the ring name Colin Olsen as part of the tag team, The Olsen Twins with partner and kayfabe brother Jimmy Olsen. Nicknamed "The Feel-Good Tag Team of the Decade", Colin and Jimmy Olsen were a pair of goofy heels with teenybopper-like interests, such as listening to music artists like Savage Garden and Britney Spears.

Wrestling as Colin Olsen, Delaney has won wrestling championships. For his first championship, he teamed with his kayfabe brother Jimmy to win the NWA Upstate Tag Team Championship on November 13, 2004 by defeating the Ring Crew Express (Kevin Dunn and Mean Marcos). They held the belts for over six months before dropping them to The Outcast Killaz on May 14, 2005. They also captured the RCW Tag Team Championship on January 20, 2006 defeating the Prophets of Pain (Father Synne and Hard Knox) and held it until June 9, 2006.

On May 19, 2007, Olsen defeated "Mastiff" Will Christianson and Damien Alexander to win NWA Empire's Lord of the Dance Championship, a title which can only be contested in three-way matches.

On June 7, 2007 Colin and Jimmy Olsen wrestled for Action Packed Wrestling in Rutland, Vermont, in a 3-Way Scramble Match against Dunn and Marcos and Rhythm and Booze.

Colin's last defense of the NWA Empire's Lord of the Dance Championship was on December 8, 2007 where he wrestled his kayfabe brother Jimmy Olsen and "Mastiff" Will Christianson. At an NWA Empire show on February 9, 2008, Delaney vacated the title due to his ECW brand commitments.

=== World Wrestling Entertainment (2007–2008) ===
Delaney made his World Wrestling Entertainment debut as a jobber, seen wrestling on the ECW brand. He was first beaten by Shelton Benjamin on the December 18, 2007 episode of ECW, before getting squashed by Big Daddy V two weeks later. On the January 8, 2008 episode of ECW, Delaney was beaten again, this time by Mark Henry from the SmackDown! brand. Delaney would also be squashed by Kane and The Great Khali. On the January 29, 2008 episode of ECW, WWE Tag Team Champions John Morrison and the Miz defeated Delaney in a Handicap match. After the match, The Miz and Morrison continued to attack Delaney, but he was saved after Tommy Dreamer came to the ring.

Delaney picked up his first win in WWE on the February 26, 2008 episode of ECW, defeating The Miz and John Morrison in a tag team match with Tommy Dreamer. On March 11, he and Dreamer challenged The Miz and Morrison for the WWE Tag Team Championships in an Extreme Rules match, but came up short after having lost a subsequent title match the week before. In the following weeks, ECW General Manager Armando Estrada informed Colin that he would have to acquire his first singles victory to win an "official" ECW contract. Delaney unsuccessfully faced a number of superstars, including his own mentor Dreamer, whom Estrada threatened to fire if he lost the match. Finally, on the May 6, 2008 episode of ECW, Delaney defeated Estrada himself via a sunset flip to win his contract, which he had legitimately signed in February. He lost his "first match as an ECW superstar" against Mike Knox and then was beaten by Estrada when he signed himself to the ECW roster. Estrada was defeated by Delaney after already being defeated by Matt Hardy moments earlier, thus removing Estrada from the roster, per the orders of new ECW General Manager Theodore Long. On July 20, 2008, at The Great American Bash, Delaney turned heel by costing Tommy Dreamer his ECW Championship match against Mark Henry. On July 29, however, on ECW, he lost to Matt Hardy, which caused Henry to turn on him. The next week on ECW, Delaney remained a heel and helped Estrada beat Dreamer to earn his ECW contract. This led to an Extreme Rules match against Dreamer, where he was easily defeated. On August 15, 2008, Delaney was released from his WWE contract due to budget cuts.

=== Return to independent circuit (2008–present) ===
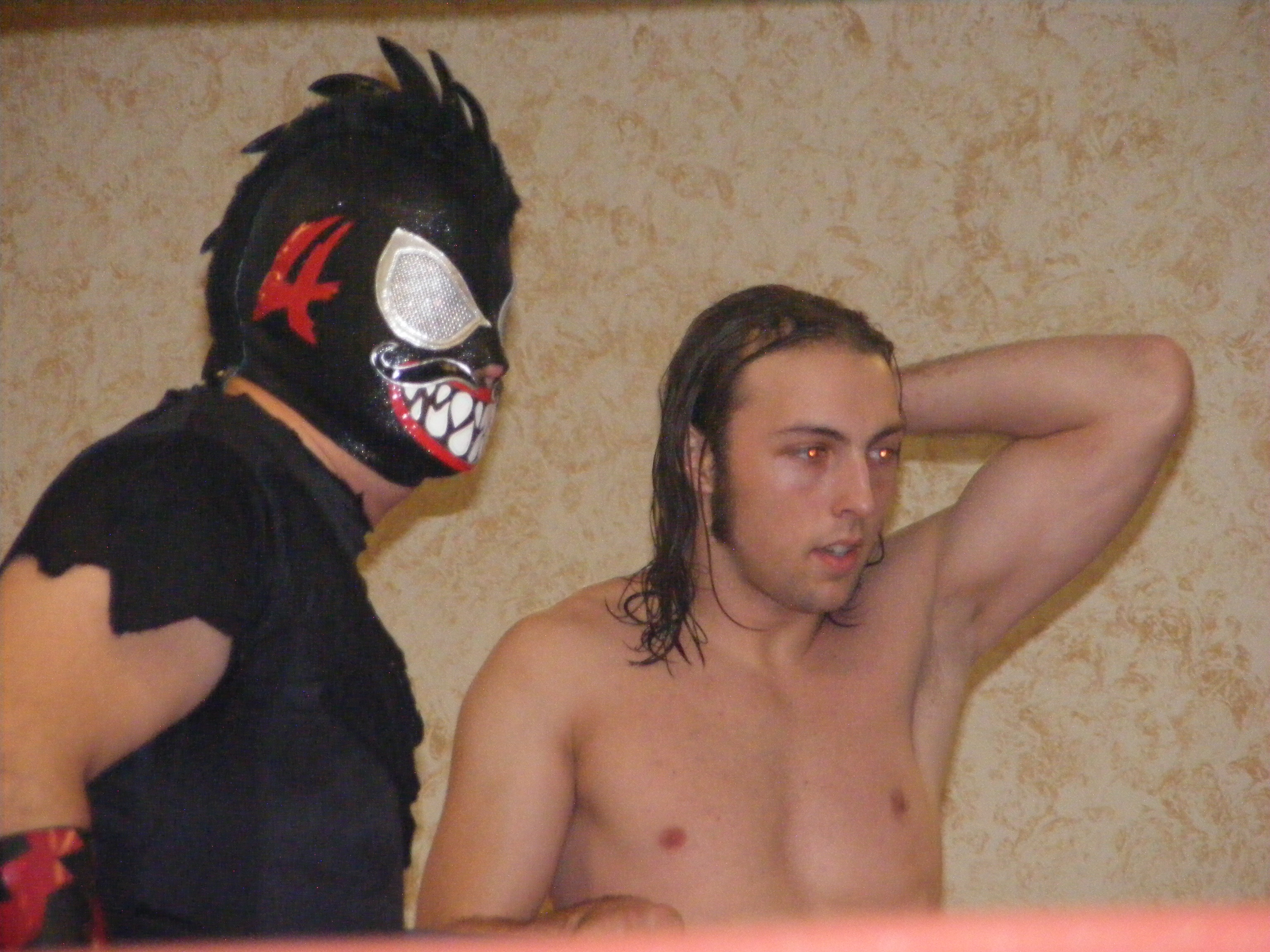
Delaney (right) and STIGMA, two members of The UnStable

On that same day, Delaney worked his first match back on the independent. Working for UWA Hardcore Wrestling, Delaney joined former partner Jimmy Olsen in a winning effort by defeating Up In Smoke. On September 6, Delaney returned to Chikara, where he received a thunderous ovation. However, the next night he turned heel, attacking Jimmy Olsen and then joining with Vin Gerard and STIGMA to form The UnStable. He also cast aside his Olsen surname and began using his Delaney surname. In the company he was trained by, NWA Upstate, He came back as a face for a few shows until he turned heel by helping heel champion Danny Doring retain his NWA Upstate title. He finally cost Danny Doring his title on September 5 to Pepper Parks and the two are now feuding. Currently he is mentoring a stable known as The Young & The Wrestlers which is made up of newer heel wrestlers. On December 5, Colin managed The Young & The Wrestlers in a 3 on 1 match against Danny Doring in Rochester NY.

Delaney won the NWA Empire Heavyweight Championship from Jonny Puma on December 6, 2008, in North Tonawanda, New York. In April Jimmy Olsen made a surprise return to NWA Empire and re-formed his tag team with Delaney by helping him defend his title against Pepper Parks. In early 2009 Delaney began feuding with D'Lo Brown in Chikara, pinning him cleanly in the first round match at the 2009 King of Trios, where The UnStable faced Brown, Al Snow and Glacier. The UnStable defeated Da Soul Touchaz to advance to the semifinals of the tournament, where they were defeated by Team Uppercut (Claudio Castagnoli, Bryan Danielson and Dave Taylor). D'Lo Brown and Glacier returned to Chikara on May 24 and avenged their trios loss by defeating Delaney and Gerard in a tag team match. In August 2009 Delaney advanced to the finals of Chikara's Young Lions Cup VII tournament, but was in the end defeated by Player Dos. On September 19, 2010, at Chikara's Through Savage Progress Cuts the Jungle Line Delaney turned on Gerard and STIGMA to re–form his tag team with Jimmy Olsen, adopting the ring name Colin Delaney Olsen in the process. On October 24, in the first match between the Olsen Twins and the UnStable, Vin Gerard picked up the victory for his team by forcing Delaney Olsen to submit. The two teams had a rematch on November 21, this time with the Olsen Twins coming out victorious. At the season nine finale on December 12, Delaney Olsen defeated Gerard in a singles match.

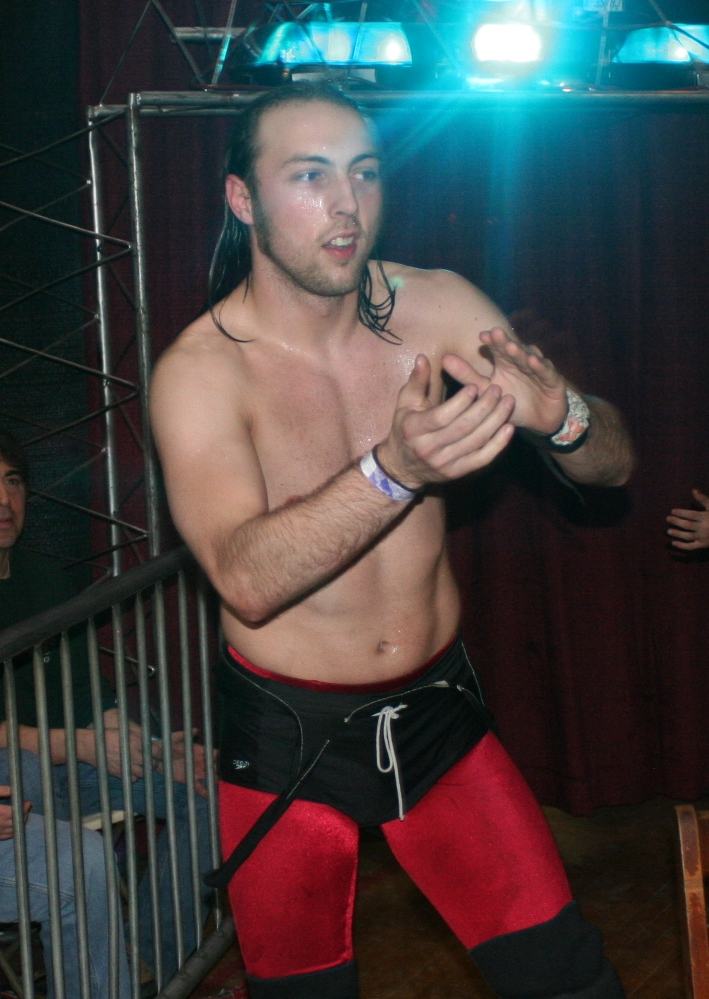
Delaney in February 2010

Throughout 2010 and 2011, he also participated in Southern Ontario's Alpha-1 wrestling, primarily feuding with Ethan Page. Since 2008, he has wrestled with the International Wrestling Cartel in Pennsylvania including holding the IWC Tag team Championship with Keith Haught in 2013 among wrestling engagements with several other promotions in the area.

=== WWE appearances (2017–2018) ===
Delaney returned to WWE on the December 12, 2017 episode of SmackDown in a squash match, teaming with Juan Francisco de Coronado (under the name Joe Monroe) in a losing effort against The Bludgeon Brothers. He made another WWE appearance on the December 19 episode of 205 Live, losing a match against the debuting Hideo Itami. On the July 10, 2018 episode of 205 Live, Delaney lost to Lio Rush.

=== All Elite Wrestling (2020–2021) ===
On January 29, 2020, Delaney made his All Elite Wrestling debut on AEW Dark. He teamed with Shawn Spears in a losing effort against Best Friends (Chuck Taylor and Trent). On the December 21, 2021 episode of AEW Dark, he lost to Eddie Kingston. On the December 29 New Year's Smash episode of Dynamite, he lost to Wardlow. After the match, he was attacked with a steel chair by Shawn Spears.

== Championships and accomplishments ==
- Absolute Intense Wrestling
  - AIW Absolute Championship (1 time)
  - AIW Tag Team Championship (6 times) – with Jimmy Olsen (1) and Cheech (5)
- Empire State Wrestling
  - ESW Tag Team Championship (1 time) - with Cheech
- International Wrestling Cartel
  - IWC Tag Team Championship (1 time) – with Keith Haught
- NWA Empire
  - NWA Empire Heavyweight Championship (1 time)
  - NWA Empire Tag Team Championship (1 time) – with Mean Marcos
  - NWA Empire Lord of the Dance Championship (1 time)
  - NWA Southern Junior Heavyweight Championship (1 time)
- NWA Upstate
  - NWA Upstate Tag Team Championship (1 time) – with Jimmy Olsen
- Pier 6 Wrestling
  - P6W Heavyweight Championship (1 time)
- Pro Wrestling Illustrated
  - PWI ranked #262 of the top 500 singles wrestlers in the PWI 500 in 2015
- Roc City Wrestling
  - RCW Tag Team Championship (1 time) – with Jimmy Olsen
- Squared Circle Wrestling
  - 2CW Tag Team Championship (1 time) – with Jimmy Olsen
- Southern Tier Wrestling
  - STW Tag Team Championship (1 time) - with Cheech
- Upstate Pro Wrestling
  - UPW No Limits Championship (1 time)
  - UPW Tag Team Championship (1 time) - with Cheech
  - Upstate 8 Tournament (2018) - with Cheech
- Xcite Wrestling
  - Xcite Tag Team Championship (1 time) - with Cheech
