= Incoherence =

Incoherence may refer to:

- Lack of coherence
- The Incoherence of the Incoherence (Arabic: تهافت التهافت Tahāfut al-Tahāfut) by Ibn Rushd (Averroes) (1126–1198)
- The Incoherence of the Philosophers (تهافت الفلاسفة Tahāfut al-Falāsifaʰ in Arabic)
- Incoherence (2006–2010), professional wrestling tag team of Hallowicked, Delirious and Frightmare
- Incoherence (album), a 2004 album by Peter Hammill
- Incoherence (film), a 1994 short film by Bong Joon-ho

== See also ==
- Incoherents, a 19th-century French art movement
