= Bruderschaft des Kreuzes =

Professional wrestling stable

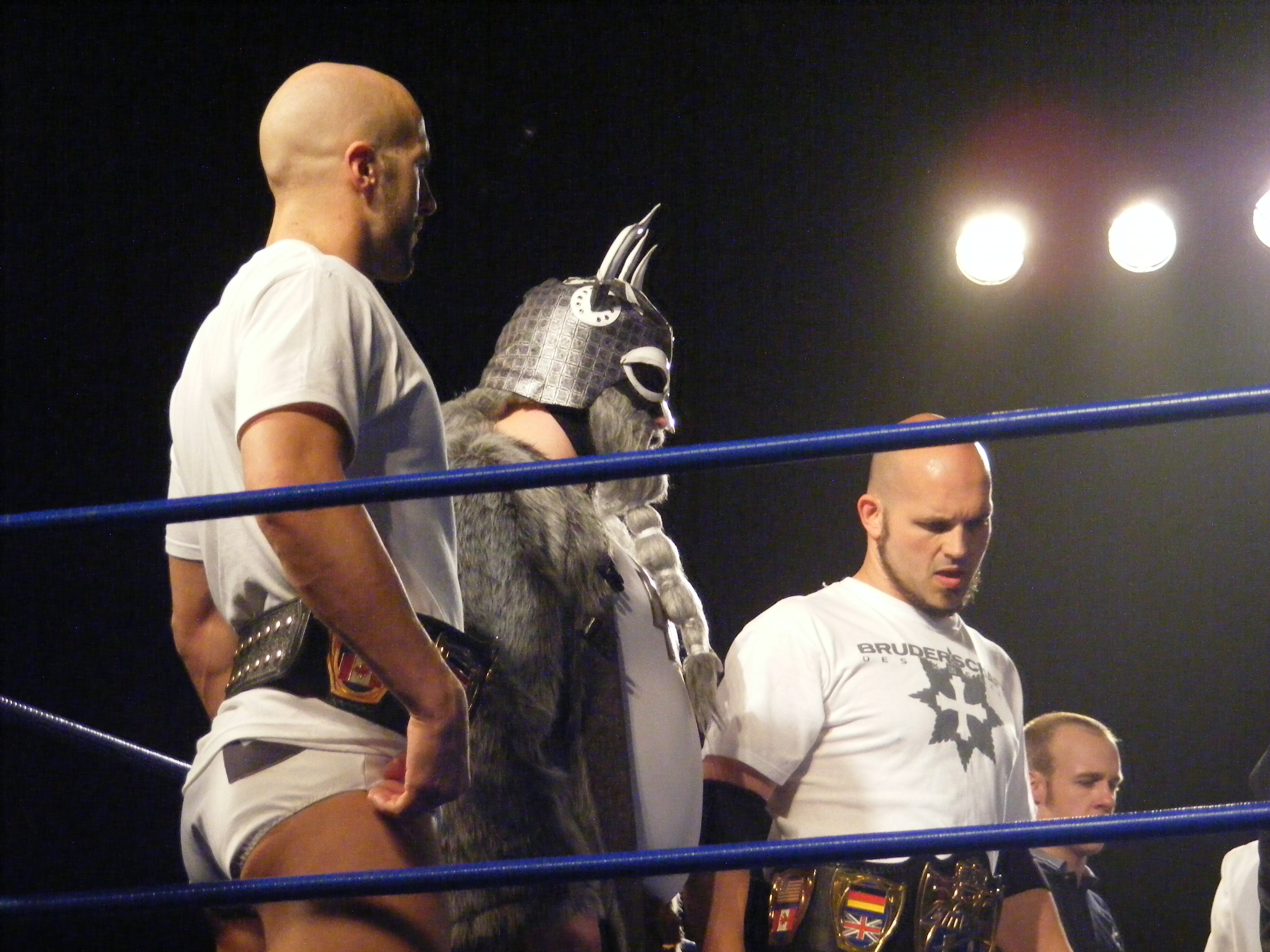
- Castagnoli (left) and Ares (right) as the Campeones de Parejas in April 2010, with Tursas (center)

Stable
- Members: Ares; Claudio Castagnoli; Daizee Haze; Delirious; Derek Sabato; Dieter VonSteigerwalt; Jaka; Jakob Hammermeier; Lince Dorado; Milo Schnitzler; Nøkken; Pinkie Sanchez; Sara Del Rey; Soldier Ant; Tim Donst; Tursas
- Debut: November 22, 2009; Philadelphia, Pennsylvania
- Years active: 2009–2012; 2013–2016

Bruderschaft des Kreuzes (BDK) (German for "Brotherhood of the Cross", commonly abbreviated to BDK) was a professional wrestling stable in the Chikara promotion.

== History ==
=== Chikara ===
==== Background (2007–2009) ====
On May 27, 2007, at Aniversario? Mike Quackenbush defeated longtime rival Chris Hero in a match two years in the making with a new submission maneuver called the Chikara Special. Following the match Quackenbush announced that since he knew Hero would never be able to break the hold, he would teach it and the counter to it to all tecnicos (good guys) on the Chikara roster. After Lince Dorado, El Pantera, Equinox and Claudio Castagnoli had all used the move to defeat Hero, he was booked to wrestle Equinox in a hair vs. mask match on November 11, 2007, at The Sordid Perils of Everyday Existence. During the match Equinox managed to lock in the Chikara Special, only for Hero to counter out of it and apply the move himself to force Equinox to tap out and lose his mask.

Quackenbush, wanting to find out who had leaked the move and the counter to it to Hero, sent Tim Donst to infiltrate the rudo (villain) stable The Order of the Neo-Solar Temple, led by UltraMantis Black. While undercover in the stable Donst found out that the leak had been Shane Storm, the tag team partner of Mike Quackenbush, who was at the time on a losing streak and was ready to exchange the move for a win over Temple member Hydra. On June 14, 2008, Donst left the Temple and revealed the leak to Quackenbush, who immediately attacked Storm. The team had previously earned a Campeonatos de Parejas (Tag Team Championship) title match, but instead of picking Donst to be his new tag team partner, Quackenbush decided to pick Jigsaw. Donst went on to form a comedy tag team with Hydra, who had left the Neo-Solar Temple with him. However, in August 2009 Quackenbush thanked Donst for the infiltration by teaching him (and only him) a new submission maneuver, the Inverted Chikara Special, in order to give him an edge in the upcoming Young Lions Cup.

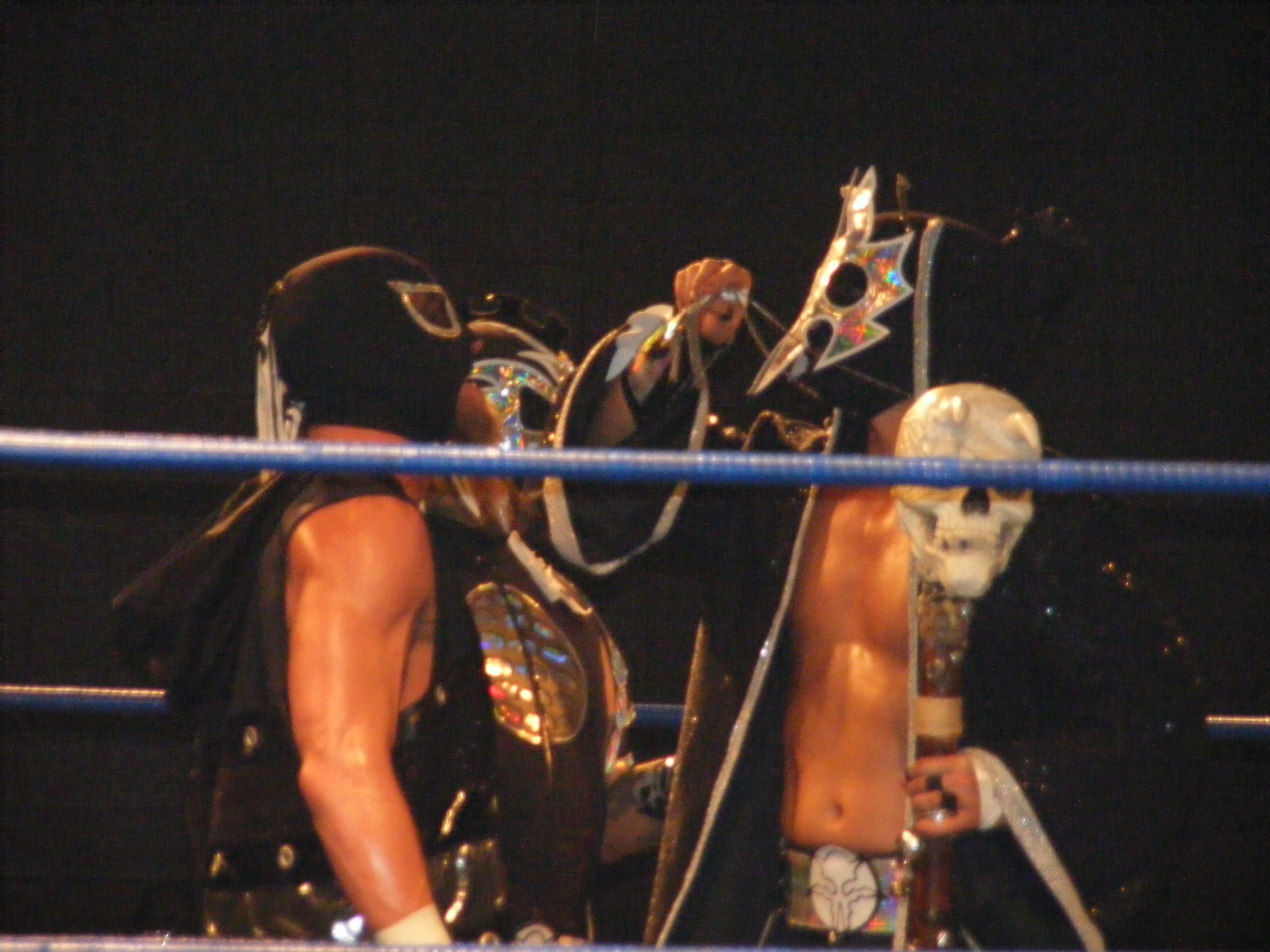
UltraMantis Black (right) controlling Delirious with the Eye of Tyr

It wasn't until January 2009 when UltraMantis Black revealed that he had done this to get a hold of the Eye of Tyr, a mysterious Scandinavian artifact that could be used to control people's minds, named after the Norse god of war. The artifact, which had gone missing from Switzerland, had suddenly appeared in the possession of Dr. Cube, a rudo manager in Kaiju Big Battel. Cube, a fan of Chris Hero's, agreed to swap the Eye for the chance to have Hero wrestle for him. Once UltraMantis had learned both the Chikara Special and the counter to it from Storm, he taught them to Hero; to return the favor Hero left Chikara for good and went to wrestle for Dr. Cube at Kaiju Big Battel.

The Order of the Neo-Solar Temple had been looking for a third member to join UltraMantis and Crossbones after Hydra's departure. After failed attempts with Pinkie Sanchez and Sami Callihan, UltraMantis saw a chance to get back at his former stable mate Hallowicked and used the Eye of Tyr in April 2009 to gain control over the mind of his Incoherence team mate Delirious to make him the third member of the Neo-Solar Temple. According to legend, once the Eye is used, it must be given away, or the user would face bad luck and tragedy. However, UltraMantis didn't believe this and refused to let go of the Eye.

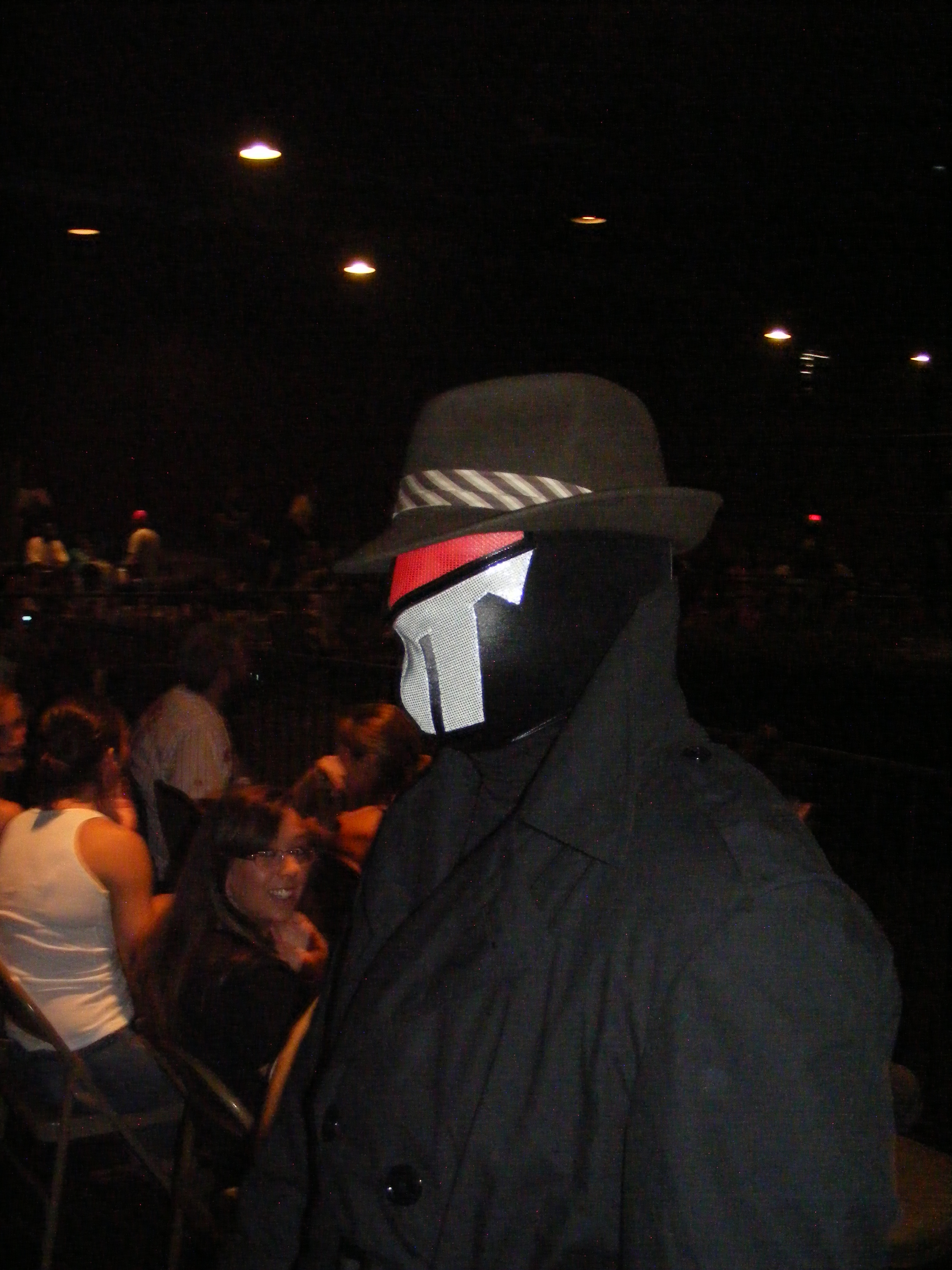
Vökoder in May 2009

On August 16, 2009, during the third night of the annual Young Lions Cup, a man dressed in a white mask and clothes confronted UltraMantis Black in the ring and gave him a box. Inside of the box was a message stating that a war was coming. That same man then began sending messages over the internet to UltraMantis saying that he and his Temple would be destroyed if he didn't return the Eye of Tyr to the "family". On October 18, 2009, at Cibernetico Increible the man was joined by another larger man dressed in similar fashion. Together, they appeared in the crowd and confronted UltraMantis, who proceeded to flee the arena. Following the event a cyborg named Vökoder, who had debuted during the Young Lions Cup, came to UltraMantis and offered to protect the Eye of Tyr. To convince him of his sincerity, Vökoder started interfering in UltraMantis' matches in order to help him win.

==== Formation (2009) ====
On November 22, 2009 at Chikara's Season eight finale titled Three Fisted Tales, following the conclusion of the main event between The Colony (Fire Ant and Soldier Ant) and The Osirian Portal (Amasis and Ophidian), the two masked men from months prior invaded the ring and one of them stated that a war was coming and that he was tired of waiting. Green Ant and Carpenter Ant came out to support their fellow Colony members, in addition to the entire tecnico locker room. Mike Quackenbush and Claudio Castagnoli confronted the men, however, one of the men demanded to meet the man with the real power and pointed at UltraMantis Black, who had been doing commentary during the main event. UltraMantis handed the Eye of Tyr to Vökoder before entering the ring, where he said that he was sick of the men and claimed to not even know who they were. This led to both men removing their masks, the larger man revealed another mask with a helmet, horns and beard, while the man with the microphone unmasked as Ares, a Swiss wrestler. Immediately following this Castagnoli, fellow Swiss and Ares' longtime tag team partner, blasted Quackenbush with a European uppercut, turning rudo in Chikara for the first time in three years. A massive brawl broke out, during which Vökoder attacked UltraMantis Black, Carpenter Ant, a relatively new member of The Colony, who had shocked everyone by winning the annual torneo cibernetico with an inverted Chikara Special, turned on the rest of The Colony and Sara Del Rey and Daizee Haze, who had been complaining about the way the company had used them, turned on Chikara wrestlers, helping the rebel faction. Once the fight had subdued with the new group on top, Carpenter Ant unmasked as Pinkie Sanchez and Vökoder unmasked as Tim Donst, both of whom had a history with the Order of the Neo-Solar Temple. The group saluted in a formation, before the larger masked man cut the lights and the stable fled the arena, with the Eye of Tyr intact.

The following day, a Podcast-A-Go-Go special update with Claudio Castagnoli revealed the group's name to be "The Bruderschaft", while also claiming that the group has eight members as opposed to the seven already known. A week later, the Chikara website added a fourth section to the website specifically for the Bruderschaft des Kreuzes alongside the tecnico, rudo and staff pages. On the page, they confirmed the mystery masked man to be a Finn named Tursas, after a sea monster in the Finnish mythology. The eighth member remained unknown.

On December 7, 2009, Chikara's official website announced that a Chikara Wrestle Factory trainee named Dieter VonSteigerwalt, representing BDK, was taking over as the new Director of Fun, replacing Leonard F. Chikarason, who was reassigned as a commentator. During the season break, Sanchez began wearing a pink and white version of the ant mask worn by The Colony, while also adopting the nickname "Pink Ant".

==== Championship success (2010) ====
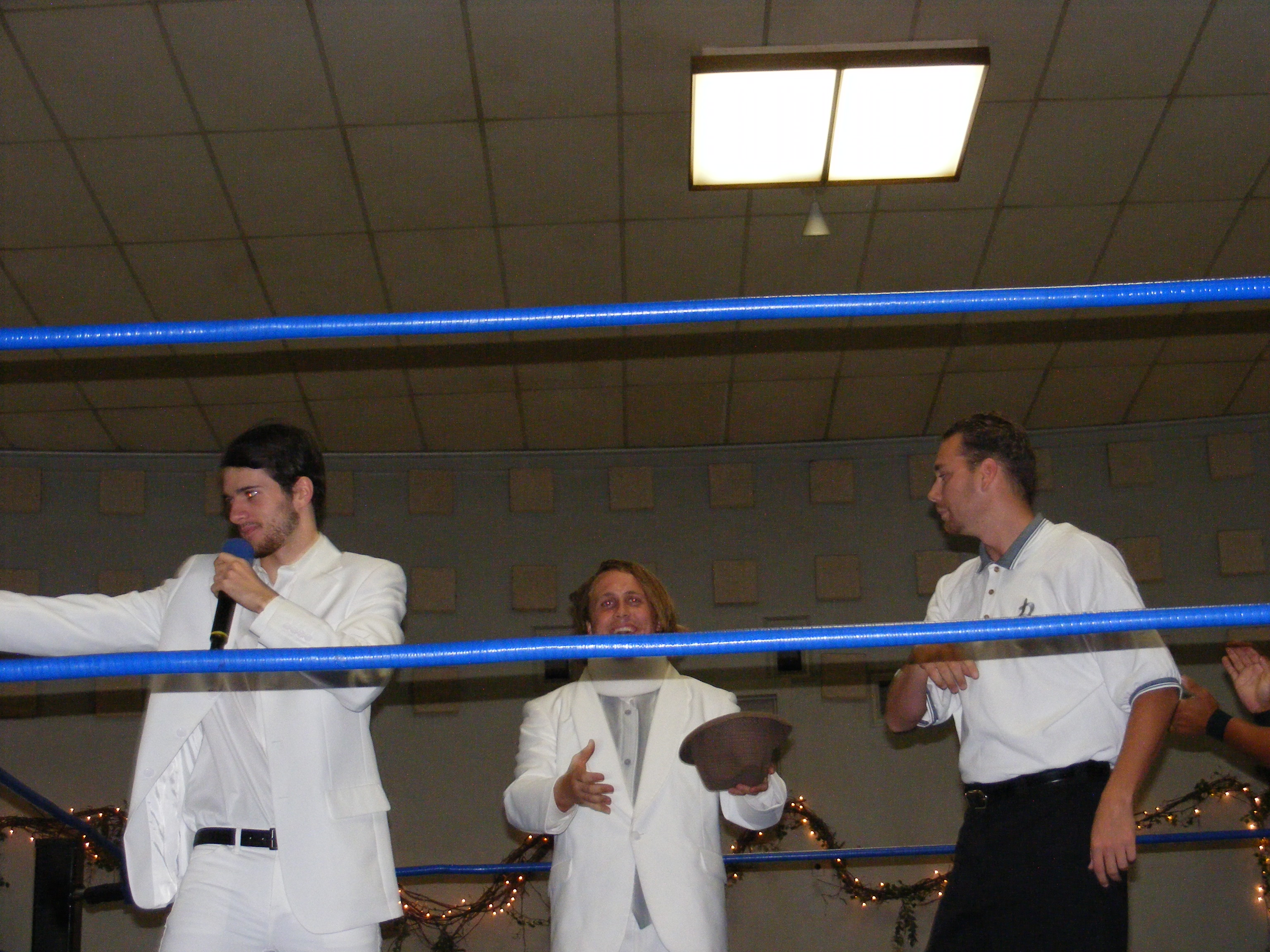
(From left to right) BDK members Dieter VonSteigerwalt, Jakob Hammermeier and Derek Sabato

On January 31, 2010, at the season nine premiere, titled A Touch of Class, Lince Dorado was revealed as BDK's eighth member, as he turned on his frequent tag team partner Equinox and together he, Castagnoli, Ares and Tursas defeated Quackenbush, Jigsaw, Equinox and Eddie Kingston, Dorado's replacement in the tecnico team, in an eight-man tag team match, when Castagnoli pinned Kingston, with whom he had feuded most of the previous year, after a low blow. This victory marked a clean sweep for BDK, as earlier in the evening, Donst defeated Player Dos to win the Young Lions Cup, Sanchez began his quest to destroy the Colony after defeating Green Ant and Haze and Del Rey defeated former Campeones de Parejas, The Osirian Portal, in a tag team match. At the event, BDK also debuted their own ring announcer named Jakob Hammermeier. During the weekend of February 27 and 28 Ares and Castagnoli picked up the three points needed in order to challenge for the Campeonatos de Parejas, by defeating The Throwbacks (Dasher Hatfield and Sugar Dunkerton) during the first night and winning a four-way elimination match the second night. During the main event of the second night, in which UltraMantis Black and Delirious challenged The Colony for the Campeonatos de Parejas, Ares used the Eye of Tyr to release Delirious, who then proceeded to go crazy and run out of the arena, leaving UltraMantis to be pinned by The Colony, who retained their titles in two straight falls. The following day Ares declared victory over UltraMantis and announced that now that he had gained revenge on him by destroying his dream of winning, not only the Campeonatos de Parejas, but also the King of Trios, he would be returning the Eye of Tyr to Switzerland and his father's collection. Ares and Castagnoli used their three points at the following show Wit, Verve, and a Bit o' Nerve on March 20, 2010, and defeated The Colony in two straight falls, following interference from Pinkie Sanchez, Lince Dorado and Tursas, who powerbombed Soldier Ant against a wall and rendered him unconscious for most of the match, to win the Campeonatos de Parejas.

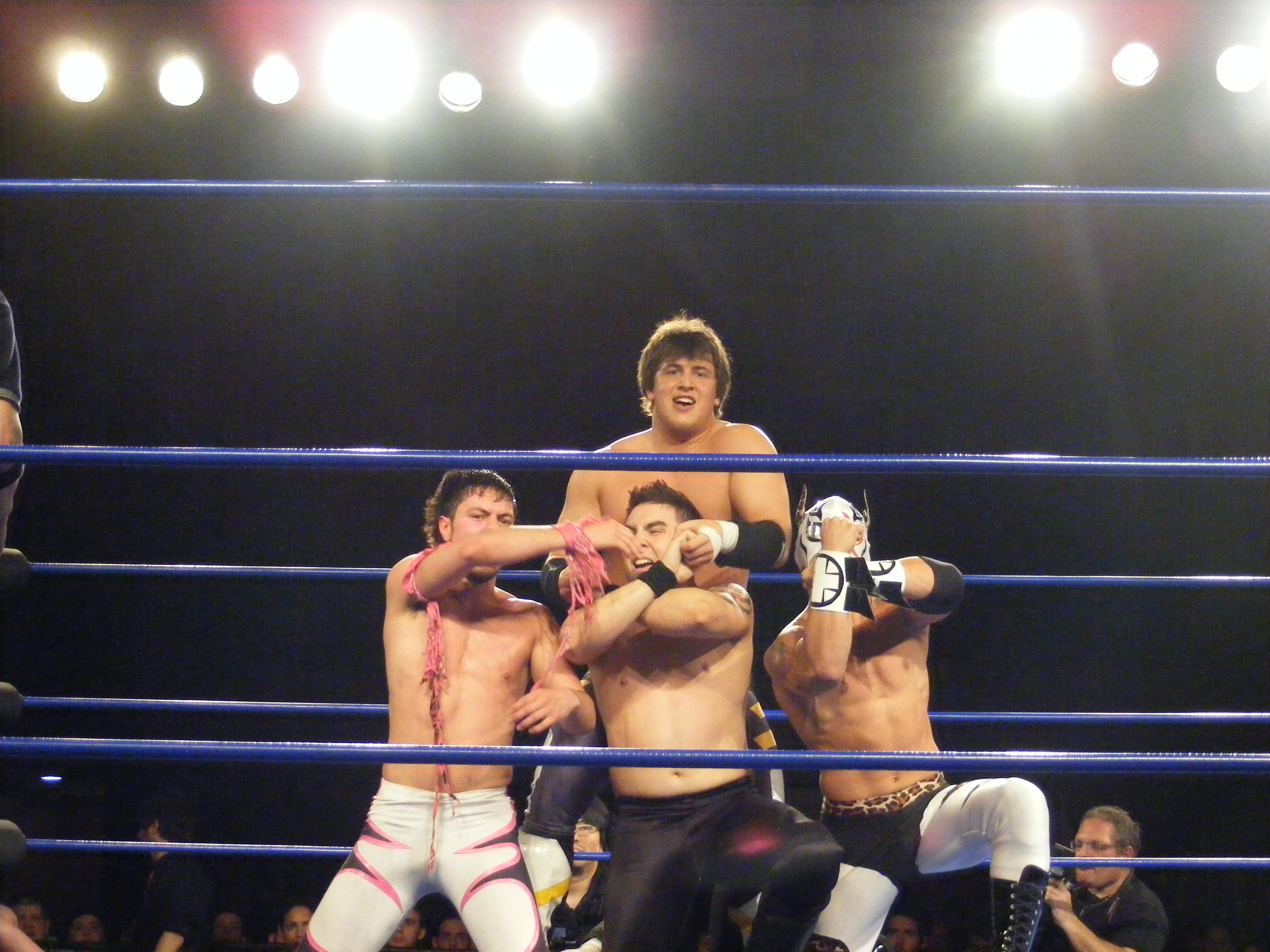
Pinkie Sanchez (left) and Lince Dorado (right) posing next to Ryan Cruz as Tim Donst holds him in a straight jacket choke

On April 23, BDK entered the 2010 King of Trios tournament with two trios, the first one consisting of Ares, Castagnoli and Tursas and the second of Donst, Dorado and Sanchez. When Ares', Castagnoli's and Tursas' original first round opponents Team Mexico (Jorge "Skayde" Rivera, Valiente and Turbo) no-showed the event, their replacement trio was decided by a random draw. After Amasis and Ophidian of the Osirian Portal were picked as their opponents, BDK's own Director of Fun Dieter VonSteigerwalt picked their trios partner out of his own hat and came up Sara Del Rey. Ares, Castagnoli and Tursas advanced in the tournament, pinning Ophidian with their new triple team finisher Ragnarok, after a low blow from Del Rey. Later in the night, Donst, Dorado and Sanchez continued BDK's winning streak by defeating The F1rst Family (Arik Cannon, Darin Corbin and Ryan Cruz) to advance to the second round. The following day Ares, Castagnoli and Tursas defeated Team Perros del Mal (El Alebrije, Cuije and El Oriental) to advance to the semifinals of the tournament, while The Colony (Fire Ant, Soldier Ant and Green Ant) handed BDK their first non-disqualification loss by eliminating the trio of Donst, Dorado and Sanchez from the tournament. On April 25 Ares, Castagnoli and Tursas first defeated Team Big Japan Wrestling (Daisuke Sekimoto, Kankuro Hoshino and Yuji Okabayashi) in the semifinals and then The Colony in the finals, after referee Derek Sabato, who had not been seen in Chikara since December 2008, returned to replace Bryce Remsburg, whom Tursas had knocked out, and performed a fast count, to win the 2010 King of Trios. After the match Sabato revealed himself as the newest member of BDK and in a blog entry on Chikara's official website announced that VonSteigerwalt, whom he had met when he was just starting his training at the Chikara Wrestle Factory, had reinstated him after realizing that his referees had lost power over the wrestlers and the respect of the fans.

On May 22, at Aniversario Zehn Ares faced UltraMantis Black in a grudge match. The match ended when Delirious made his return to the company, now aligned with BDK, and provided the distraction, which led to Ares scoring the pinfall victory. The following day at Aniversario Elf Delirious was instrumental in helping BDK retain the Campeonatos de Parejas against his former Incoherence team mates Hallowicked and Frightmare. Later that night Ares and Castagnoli ruined Eddie Kingston's dream match with his idol Tommy Dreamer, after which Dreamer helped Kingston chase them away, before challenging the Campeones de Parejas to a tag team match for July 25 at The Arena in Philadelphia. After the weekend UltraMantis Black finally took responsibility for causing the formation of BDK, before declaring that it was now his job to take the stable down. On June 26 at We Must Eat Michigan's Brain Delirious wrestled his first match as a member of BDK, losing to his former mentor, UltraMantis Black. That same night the brand new Kings of Trios suffered their first six-man tag team loss, losing to Da Soul Touchaz (Acid Jaz, Marshe Rockett and Willie Richardson), after an interference from Eddie Kingston. The following day at Faded Scars and Lines Ares and Castagnoli successfully defended their Campeonatos de Parejas against Equinox and Helios in two straight falls, after another pre–match assault. After the event UltraMantis Black announced that he would lead Chikara into a final battle with BDK in the torneo cibernetico match on October 23. On July 26 at Chikarasaurus Rex: King of Show Vökoder, the cyborg previously portrayed by BDK's Tim Donst, made a return to Chikara, staring down Pinkie Sanchez after a match, where he, Donst, Dorado and Tursas defeated Fire Ant, Green Ant, Soldier Ant and Frightmare. However, none of the other members of BDK were able to see Vökoder before he disappeared from the arena and questioned Sanchez's mental stability, when he tried to explain what he had seen. In the main event of the evening Ares and Castagnoli defeated Eddie Kingston and Tommy Dreamer in a non–title match.

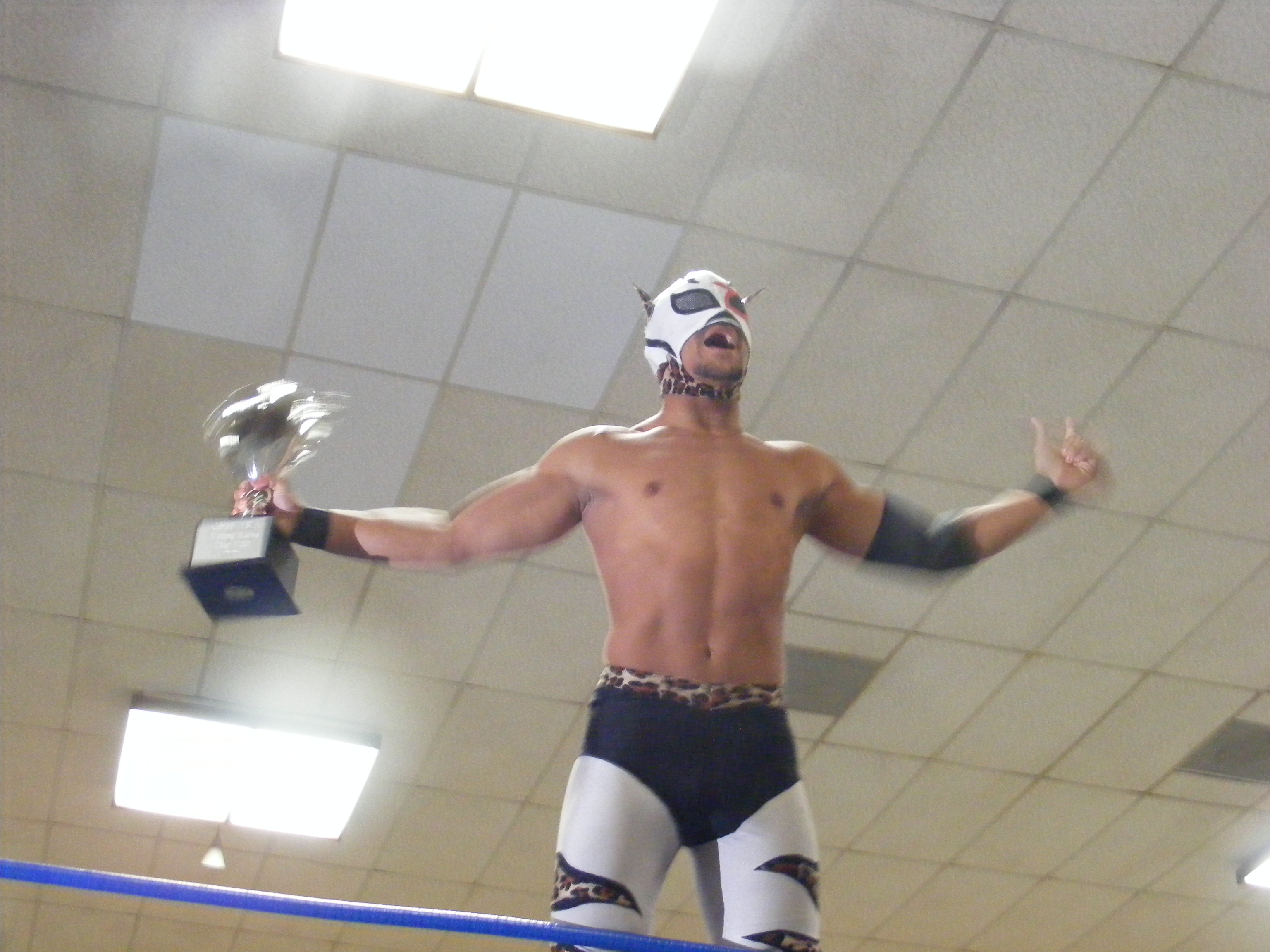
Lince Dorado holding the Young Lions Cup

After successful defenses against Player Uno, Dasher Hatfield, Soldier Ant and Frightmare, Tim Donst was forced to vacate the Young Lions Cup on August 27 in time for the eighth annual Young Lions Cup tournament. Due to Sanchez's mental instability, BDK hand picked Lince Dorado as the follower to Donst and the next Young Lions Cup Champion. He entered the eighth annual Young Lions Cup tournament on August 28 and first defeated Gregory Iron in a singles match and then Adam Cole, Cameron Skyy, Keita Yano, Obariyon and Ophidian in a six-way elimination match to make it to the finals of the tournament. However, the following day Dorado was defeated in the finals by Frightmare, after BDK referee Derek Sabato was knocked unconscious and Chikara referee Bryce Remsburg ran in and performed a three count to give Chikara its first major victory over BDK. The weekend also saw the debut of Wink Vavasseur, an internal auditor hired by the Chikara Board of Directors to keep an eye on VonSteigerwalt. On September 18 at Eye to Eye BDK made their third defense of the Campeonatos de Parejas by defeating 3.0 (Scott Parker and Shane Matthews) two falls to one, the first time Ares and Castagnoli had dropped a fall in their title matches. The following day at Through Savage Progress Cuts the Jungle Line Pinkie Sanchez failed in his attempt to bring the Young Lions Cup back to BDK, when he was defeated in the title match by Frightmare. After dominating the first half of 2010, BDK managed to win only three out of the ten matches they were participating in during the weekend. On October 23 Ares captained BDK members Castagnoli, Delirious, Del Rey, Donst, Haze, Sanchez and Tursas to the torneo cibernetico match, where they faced Team Chikara, represented by captain UltraMantis Black, Eddie Kingston, Hallowicked, Icarus, Jigsaw, Mike Quackenbush, STIGMA and Vökoder). During the match Vökoder was unmasked as Larry Sweeney, who then proceeded to eliminate Sanchez from the match, before being eliminated himself by Castagnoli. Also during the match Quackenbush managed to counter the inverted Chikara Special, which Donst had used to eliminate Icarus and Jigsaw, into the original Chikara Special to force his former pupil to submit. The final four participants in the match were Castagnoli and Tursas for BDK and UltraMantis Black and Eddie Kingston for Chikara. After Tursas eliminated UltraMantis, Castagnoli got himself disqualified by low blowing Kingston. Kingston, however, managed to come back and pinned Tursas to win the match for Chikara. The following day Ares and Castagnoli defeated Amasis and Ophidian of The Osirian Portal to make their fourth successful defense of the Campeonatos de Parejas. Meanwhile, Sara Del Rey and Daizee Haze defeated the Super Smash Bros. (Player Uno and Player Dos) to earn their third point and the right to challenge for the championship. While Del Rey and Haze were toying with the idea of cashing their points and challenging Ares and Castagnoli, the champions told them their only job was to make sure no one else in Chikara was able to gain three points. On November 21 Del Rey and Haze competed in a four–way elimination match with Mike Quackenbush and Jigsaw, The Osirian Portal and F.I.S.T. (Icarus and Chuck Taylor). After surviving the first two eliminations, Jigsaw pinned Haze to not only take away her and Del Rey's points, but also to earn himself and Quackenbush three points and the right to challenge for the Campeonatos de Parejas. At the same event Ares defeated longtime rival UltraMantis Black in a Falls Count Anywhere match.

==== Downfall (2010–2012) ====
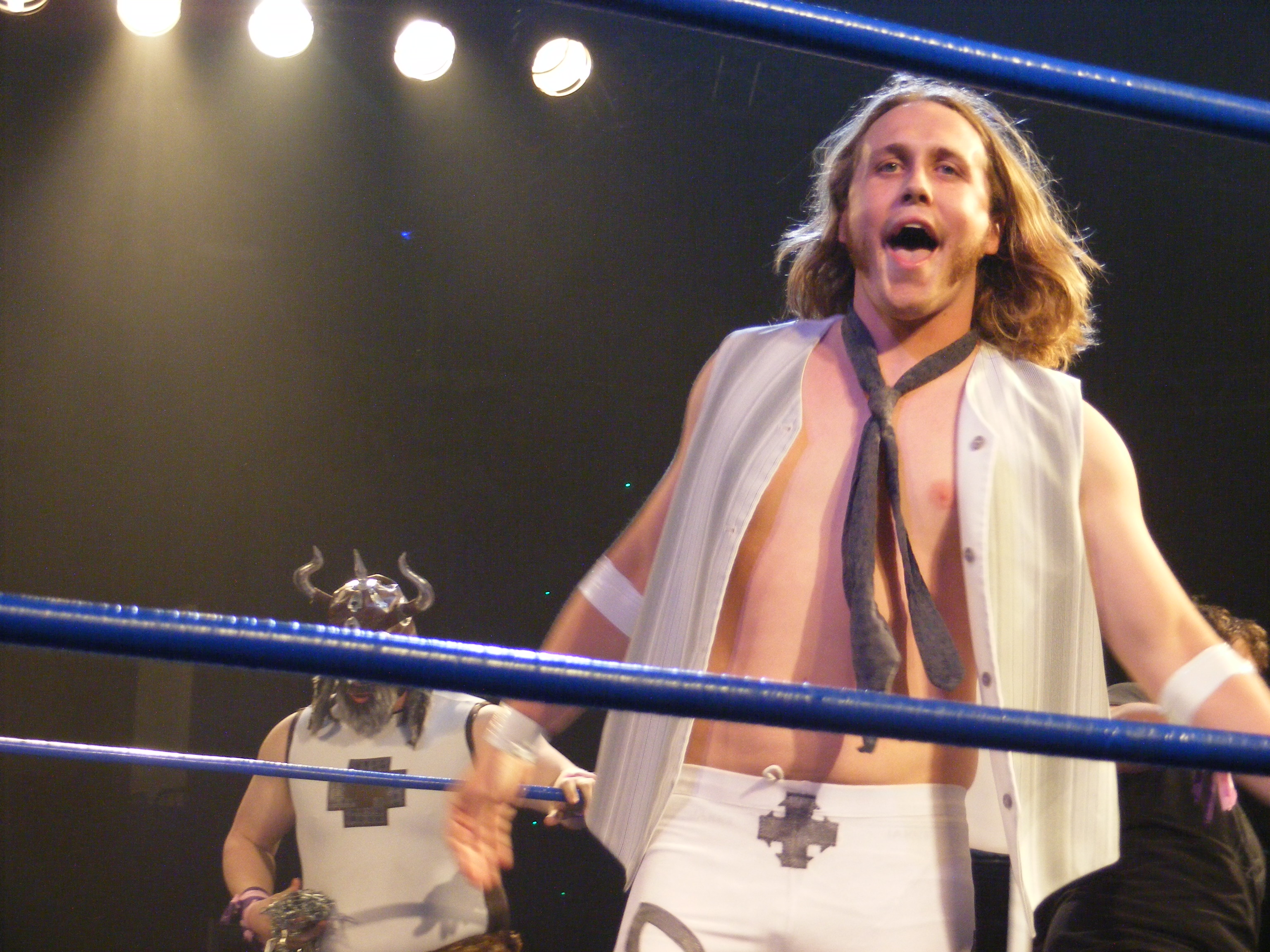
Jakob Hammermeier in April 2011

On December 12, at the season nine finale Reality is Relative, Ares and Castagnoli were set to defend the Campeonatos de Parejas against Jigsaw and Quackenbush. Prior to the start of the match, internal auditor Wink Vavasseur replaced BDK referee Derek Sabato with Bryce Remsburg, while Eddie Kingston took out Delirious, when he tried to attack the challengers. After Quackenbush and Jigsaw had won the first fall, Castagnoli took Remsburg out of the match and with help from Sabato tied the score to 1–1. However, in the third fall Remsburg came back to attack Sabato and made a three count, when Jigsaw pinned Ares, to end BDK's nine-month reign as the Campeones de Parejas. Immediately following the event BDK was stripped of all of their power in Chikara as Wink Vavasseur replaced Dieter VonSteigerwalt as the new Director of Fun.

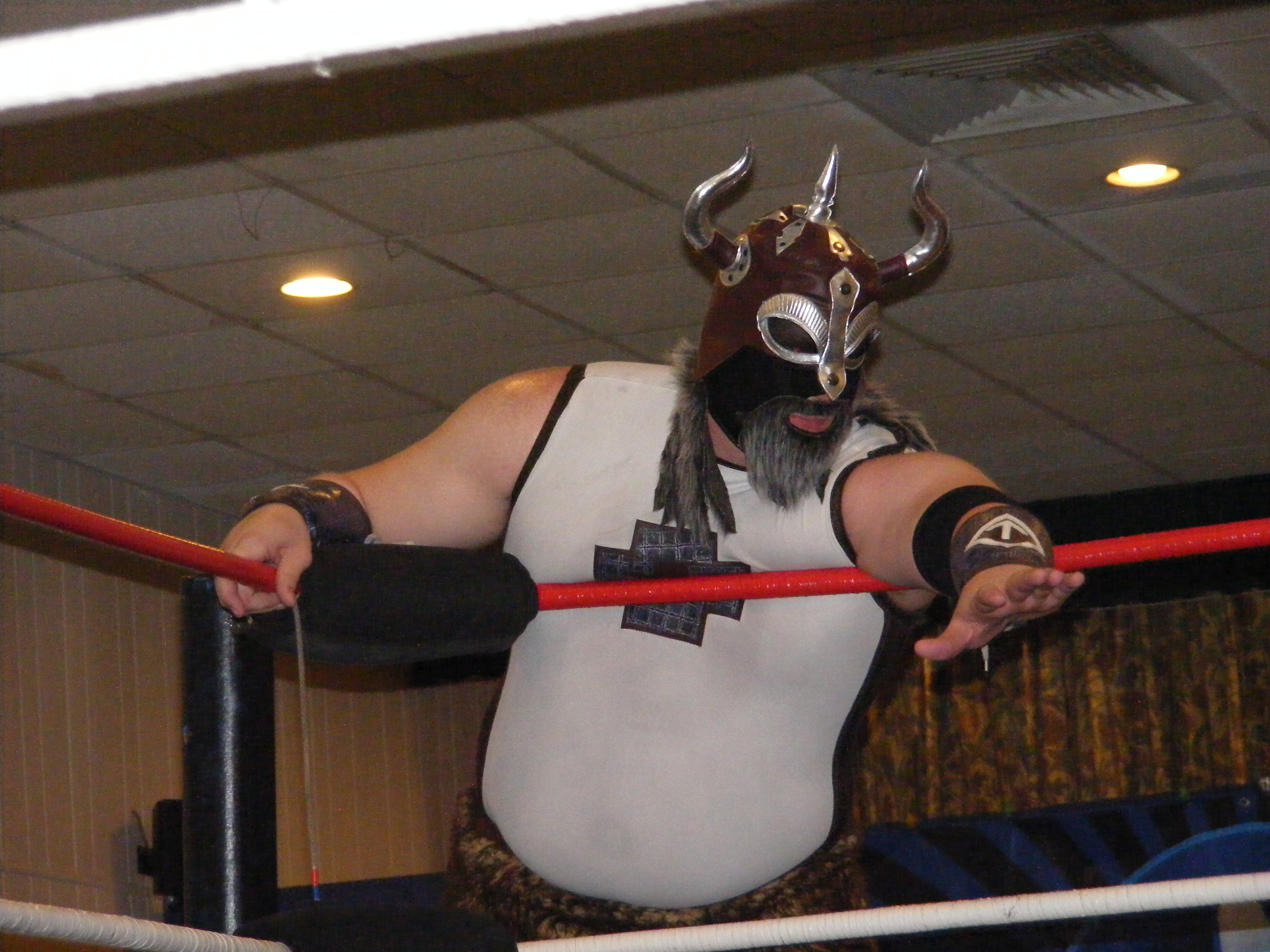
Tursas in October 2010

After not appearing at Chikara's shows in March 2011, despite being advertised, Lince Dorado's profile was quietly removed from the promotion's official website, confirming his departure from the promotion. On March 13 Claudio Castagnoli and Eddie Kingston finally faced each other in a grudge match fifteen months in the making, with Castagnoli emerging victorious after hitting Kingston with a chain. At the same event Jakob Hammermeier made his in–ring debut, defeating Green Ant, following interference from the rest of BDK. When Ares, Castagnoli and Tursas decided not to enter the 2011 King of Trios, Tim Donst was placed in charge of leading BDK in the tournament. After weeks of scouting, Donst, voicing his displeasure with the rest of BDK, announced Delirious and Jakob Hammermeier as his partners and, on April 15, led the BDK trio to defeat Da Soul Touchaz (Acid Jaz, Marshe Rockett and Willie Richardson) in the first round of the tournament. The following day, the BDK trio was eliminated from the tournament in the quarterfinal stage by The Colony (Fire Ant, Green Ant and Soldier Ant). In early 2011 Tursas was given a more prominent role in BDK as he began writing anti-American blog entries on Chikara's official website, drawing the ire of Green Ant, which led to the two entering a feud, which closely followed a feud between Lex Luger and Yokozuna from 1993 with Green Ant taking over Luger's role as the patriotic American and Tursas working as the foreign giant. After months of buildup, the two faced each other on July 30 in a match, where Tursas was victorious, following outside interference from Jakob Hammermeier. In May, both Claudio Castagnoli and Sara Del Rey were entered into the 12 Large: Summit to determine the first ever Chikara Grand Champion. On July 31 the two faced each other in a tournament match in the main event of the second night of the Chikarasaurus Rex weekend. After Del Rey managed to score an upset win over her BDK leader, Castagnoli turned on, not only her, but also Daizee Haze, as she was standing up for her regular tag team partner. On August 3, Del Rey officially announced her resignation from BDK. Three days later, Chikara announced that Daizee Haze would be taking a leave of absence from the promotion after suffering a storyline injury at the hands of Castagnoli. At the following event on August 27, Castagnoli was defeated by Icarus and thus eliminated from contention in the 12 Large: Summit. This would mark Castagnoli's final appearance for Chikara as the following month he signed a developmental contract with WWE. After losing to UltraMantis Black that same day, Pinkie Sanchez also left Chikara and BDK. On November 13 at Chikara's first internet pay-per-view, High Noon, Ares put the Eye of Tyr and Donst his hair on the line against UltraMantis Black's and Hallowicked's masks in a No Disqualification match. UltraMantis ended up regaining the Eye of Tyr by pinning Ares for the win, after Donst abandoned his stablemate in order to save his hair. Following the event, all members of BDK, with the exception of Jakob Hammermeier and Tim Donst, were removed from Chikara's official roster page. In July 2012, Hammermeier and Donst began having problems with each other, highlighted by Donst costing Hammermeier his Young Lions Cup X semifinal match against A. C. H. on August 17. Despite the problems, Hammermeier was looking forward to continuing to team with Donst en route to a possible match for the Campeonatos de Parejas, however, on October 7, Donst turned on Hammermeier after a tag team match, and afterwards lashed out on him, declaring himself a singles wrestler looking for a shot at Eddie Kingston's Grand Championship instead.

==== Return (2013–2016) ====
In the autumn of 2013, BDK returned as part of a group of Chikara rudos of the past trying to bring down the "Wrestling is" promotions. During the storyline, Wrestling is Cool owner Milo Schnitzler revealed himself a member of BDK and then shut down his promotion following Ares' orders. BDK also took part in the storyline-closing brawl with the Chikara roster on February 1, 2014, at the second National Pro Wrestling Day, which resulted in the return of Chikara. The new BDK was made up of Ares, Schnitzler, Tursas and a new character named Nøkken. On July 19, Tursas was "killed off" after a 10-man tag team match when Estonian ThunderFrog jumped from the top rope and crushed Tursas with the Hammer of Peace. His teammates carried his body out of the arena and he has not been seen since, leaving the BDK down a member. On September 19, Jakob Hammermeier returned to Chikara, revealed to have been under the guise of Dr. Cube, and used the Eye of Tyr to have the rest of BDK turn on Ares and take over the leadership of the stable. On October 26, Delirious returned to BDK, teaming with Hammermeier and Nøkken to defeat Frightmare, Hallowicked and UltraMantis Black. On November 16, Milo Schnitzler was kicked out of BDK. In early 2015, BDK was made up of Hammermeier, Nøkken, Soldier Ant and the returning Pinkie Sanchez. Soldier Ant left BDK and returned to the Colony on December 5, when Hammermeier's mind control over him was broken after an accidental punch.

== Championships and accomplishments ==
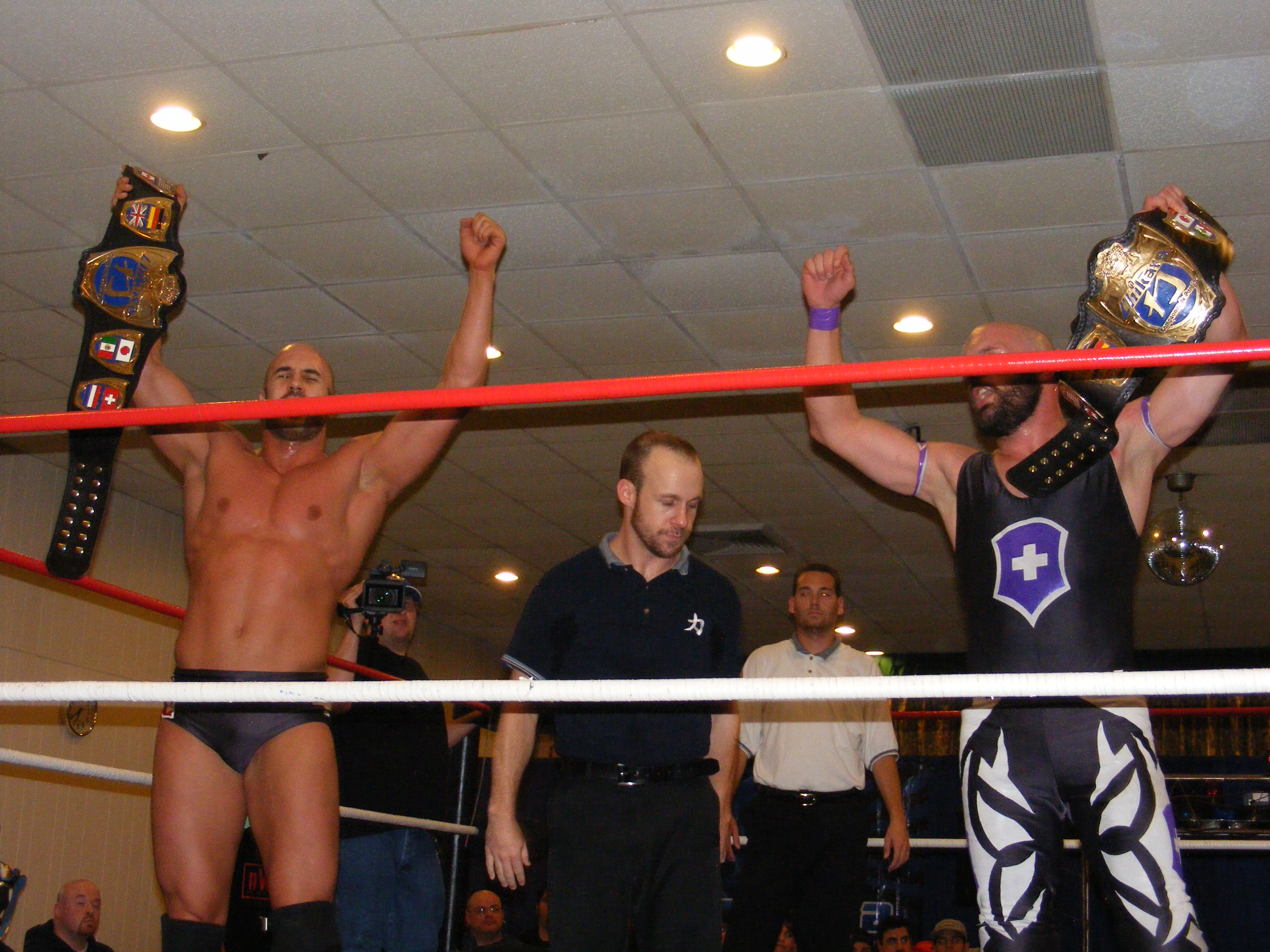
Claudio Castagnoli and Ares as the Campeones de Parejas

- Chikara
  - Campeonatos de Parejas (1 time) – Ares and Castagnoli
  - Young Lions Cup (1 time) – Donst
  - King of Trios (2010) – Ares, Castagnoli and Tursas
