= Adhesin =

Adhesins are proteins on the surface of living cells that allow the organism to colonize various surfaces and may refer to:

- Adhesin molecule (immunoglobulin -like)
- Bacterial adhesin
- Fungal adhesin

== See also ==
- Adhesion (disambiguation)
- Cell adhesion
