= Max Boyer =

Canadian professional wrestler

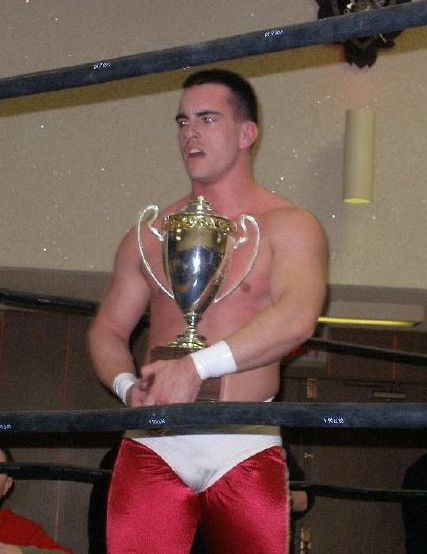
- Boyer holding the Chikara Young Lions Cup in 2007

Personal information
- Born: Maxime Boyer; June 2, 1984 (age 42) Longueuil, Quebec, Canada

Professional wrestling career
- Ring name(s): Max Boyer; Maxime Boyer
- Billed height: 5 ft 8 in (173 cm)
- Billed weight: 190 lb (86 kg)
- Billed from: Montreal, Quebec
- Trained by: Jacques Rougeau; Johnny Devine; Kobra Kai; Pierre-Carl Ouellet; Rob Fuego; Scott D'Amore
- Debut: October 13, 2001

Maxime "Max" Boyer (born June 2, 1984) is a Canadian professional wrestler, best known for his time in the Chikara and International Wrestling Syndicate (IWS) professional wrestling promotions. Boyer is a former Chikara Young Lions Cup Champion and a two–time IWS Canadian Champion and has also wrestled for promotions such as Combat Zone Wrestling (CZW), Inter Species Wrestling (ISW) and UWA Hardcore Wrestling. Boyer retired from professional wrestling in May 2008, but made his return two and a half years later in October 2010 and has remained active on the independent circuit ever since.

== Professional wrestling career ==
Boyer began training in professional wrestling in May 2002, when he entered Jacques Rougeau's wrestling school Lutte Internationale 2000 in Montreal, Quebec. He trained at the school for two years before suffering a career–threatening concussion that sidelined him for a year and a half. Boyer returned in 2005, when Kevin Steen got him a dark match with Montreal–based International Wrestling Syndicate (IWS).

=== International Wrestling Syndicate (2005–2008, 2010) ===
In his first dark match for IWS on July 23, 2005, Boyer teamed with Dave Trips and Shayne Hawke in a six-man tag team match, where they defeated Player Uno, Pornstar Juan and Twiggy. On August 20, Boyer wrestled another dark match, where he was defeated by Jimmy Stone.

Boyer made his main show debut for IWS on September 3, 2005, in a four tag team elimination match, where he and Shayne Hawke unsuccessfully challenged 2.0 (Jagged and Shane Matthews) for the IWS Tag Team Championship. At the following event on September 17 Boyer and Hawke aligned themselves with Fred La Merveille as the newest incarnation of the villainous alliance SLI–USA. The stable, which was later joined by Jagger W. Bush, would then engage in a feud with La Merveille's previous ally Viking. On December 3, 2005, Boyer wrestled his breakout match, when he faced Viking in a losing effort. On January 28, 2006, Boyer unsuccessfully challenged Kid Kamikaze for the IWS Canadian Championship. As a result of the loss, Boyer was forced to fight to keep his spot in SLI–USA and at the following event on March 11, he defeated Player Uno to remain a member of the group. On June 3, 2006, Boyer was defeated by Lionel Knight, after La Merveille accidentally hit him with a flag pole. Afterwards, Boyer attacked La Merveille and walked out on SLI–USA, turning babyface in the process. At the following event on July 8, Boyer defeated the three remaining members of SLI–USA in a gauntlet match.

Boyer then formed a new alliance with former rival, IWS Heavyweight Champion Viking and the two went on to lose to the Hardcore Ninjaz in a match for the IWS Tag Team Championship. On December 2, 2006, the two partners collided in a match for the IWS Heavyweight Championship, which saw Viking retaining his title, following interference from Jake Matthews. Afterwards, Boyer and Viking began feuding with Matthews, Pierre-Carl Ouellet and IWS owner PCP Crazy F'n Manny. In the first match between the two teams on January 20, 2007, Ouellet and Matthews defeated Boyer and Viking. Manny intended to bring in Total Nonstop Action Wrestling (TNA) performer Christian Cage to help his group's battle with Boyer and Viking, but to his surprise Cage instead chose to team with Boyer and on March 24, Boyer and Cage, in Cage's only IWS appearance, defeated Pierre-Carl Ouellet and Jake Matthews in a tag team match.

With Boyer's feud with Ouellet, Matthews and Manny behind him, he finally went on to win his first championship in IWS, when he on June 16, 2007, defeated Dan Paysan for the IWS Canadian Championship. Boyer went on to successfully defend the title against Kid Kamikaze, Exess, Jimmy K., Damian and Franky The Mobster.

On February 16, 2008, Boyer confronted new IWS Heavyweight Champion, El Generico, and demanded a shot at his title. Instead, Kevin Steen, who had just lost the title to El Generico, announced that at the following show, the three of them would wrestle for the title in a three–way match. During the Heavyweight Championship match on March 22, Boyer turned heel by attacking El Generico's knee with a chair and then managed to force him to submit with a half Boston crab. However, the match continued as there was no referee in the ring to end it and eventually Steen managed to regain the title by forcing El Generico to submit with his own hold. On April 26 Boyer defeated El Generico in a grudge match for the IWS Canadian Championship to set up a match with Steen, where both the Heavyweight and the Canadian Championships were on the line. On May 24, 2008, Steen defeated Boyer to retain the IWS Heavyweight Championship and win the IWS Canadian Championship, ending Boyer's reign at 343 days. Following the match Boyer quietly retired from professional wrestling, due to his previous problems with concussions.

On October 9, 2010, IWS held its final show before ceasing its operations, during which Boyer made his return and wrestled his first match in two and a half years, defeating Vanessa Kraven, Alex Silva, Kid Kamikaze, Mike Bailey and then–champion, former partner Shayne Hawke in a six–way elimination match to regain the IWS Canadian Championship. Immediately following the match, Boyer was challenged to another match for the title by Franky The Mobster. Boyer accepted the challenge and defeated Franky to retain the Canadian Championship and end his run with IWS as a champion.

=== Chikara (2006–2007, 2010–2011) ===
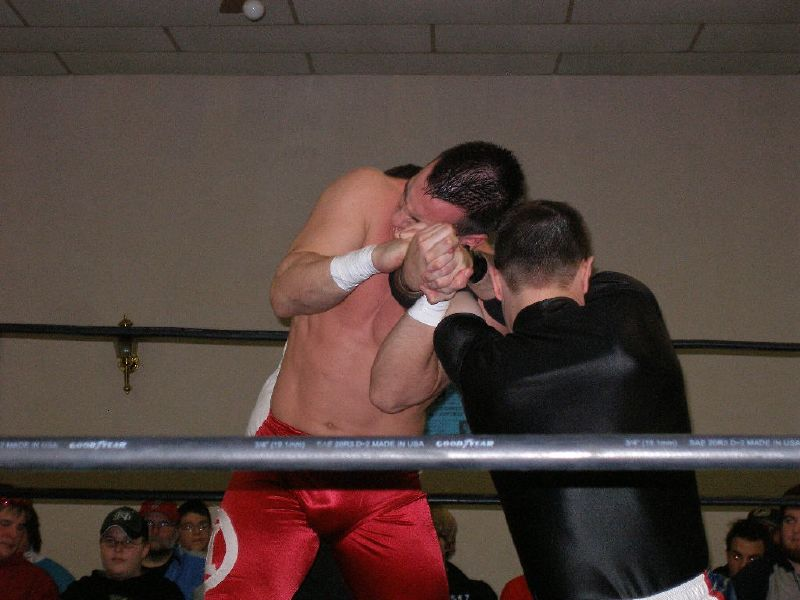
Boyer in the ring with Mike Quackenbush

On February 26, 2006, Boyer made his debut for Philadelphia, Pennsylvania–based Chikara in a ten-man tag team match, where he, Player Uno, SeXXXy Eddy, Dragon Dragon and Retail Dragon defeated Jagged, Shane Matthews, Larry Sweeney and Phil and Sean Davis. On June 23 Boyer entered the Young Lions Cup IV tournament, defeating Brandon Thomaselli in his first round match. Later that same day, Boyer was eliminated from the tournament in the six–way elimination semifinal match by Arik Cannon, who would go on to win the entire tournament. On October 28 Boyer defeated Cannon in a return singles match to win the Young Lions Cup. He then went on to successfully defend the Cup against Josh Daniels and Ricochet. On February 17, 2007, Boyer teamed with fellow IWS performers Jagged and Shane Matthews in the first ever King of Trios tournament. The team, billed as Team Canada, was eliminated from the tournament in the first round by the eventual King of Trios, Mike Quackenbush, Jigsaw and Shane Storm. After three more defenses of the Young Lions Cup against Sal Thomaselli, Soldier Ant and Create-A-Wrestler, Boyer was forced to vacate the title in time for the fifth annual Young Lions Cup tournament. As a former champion, Boyer would never again be allowed to challenge for the Cup. Boyer's five successful defenses of the Young Lions Cup would remain a Chikara record until March 2011, when it was broken by Frightmare.

After his final Young Lions Cup defense against Create-A-Wrestler on May 26, 2007, at Aniversario?, Chris Hero appeared ringside seemingly trying to recruit Boyer into his The Kings of Wrestling stable, but before he could do so, Icarus and Gran Akuma, who had recently been battling Hero and Larry Sweeney over the leadership of the Kings of Wrestling, entered the ring and asked Boyer to join them instead. Boyer accepted the offer and aligned himself with Icarus, Akuma and Chuck Taylor, the trio also known as Team F.I.S.T. The following day at Aniversario!, Boyer accompanied Taylor, Icarus and Akuma to the ring for a six-man tag team match, where they defeated Hero, Sweeney and Claudio Castagnoli, who were accompanied by Hero's newest associate Mitch Ryder. After the match Ryder managed to convince the two groups to bury their hatchet and re–unite, forming the Kings of Wrestling superstable. However, Boyer's run with the Kings of Wrestling did not last long as he wrestled only three more matches for Chikara in June and July, including a July 21 match, where he, Icarus and Akuma were defeated by The Colony (Fire Ant, Soldier Ant and Worker Ant), which would turn out to be his final match for the promotion for over three years.

On November 20, 2010, Boyer returned to Chikara, taking part in the "Golden Dreams" eight man elimination tag team match, a match consisting entirely of former Young Lions Cup Champions. Boyer was the second man eliminated from the match by the man, whom he had defeated to win the Cup four years earlier, Arik Cannon. On February 7, 2011, Chikara announced that Boyer would return to the promotion on February 20 in Reading, Pennsylvania, where he would face another former Young Lions Cup Champion, Tim Donst, who had announced his intention of proving himself to be greatest Young Lions Cup Champion of all time by beating all the other holders of the Cup. However, following interference from Hallowicked, another former Young Lions Cup Champion, Boyer managed to defeat Donst in a new Chikara record time of four seconds.

== Championships and accomplishments ==
- Chikara
  - Young Lions Cup IV (1 time)
- International Wrestling Syndicate
  - IWS Canadian Championship (2 times)
