= Vökoder =

Vökoder may refer to:

- Tim Donst, the first professional wrestler working under the character of Vökoder.
- Larry Sweeney, the second professional wrestler working under the character of Vökoder.
