= Coherence =

Coherence is, in general, a state or situation in which all the parts or ideas fit together well so that they form a united whole.

More specifically, coherence, coherency, or coherent may refer to the following:

== Physics ==
- Coherence (physics), an ideal property of waves that enables stationary (i.e. temporally and spatially constant) interference
- Coherence (units of measurement), a derived unit that, for a given system of quantities and for a chosen set of base units, is a product of powers of base units with no other proportionality factor than one
- Coherence time, the time over which a propagating wave (especially a laser or maser beam) may be considered coherent; the time interval within which its phase is, on average, predictable

== Mathematics ==
- Coherence (philosophical gambling strategy), a concept in Bayesian statistics
- Coherence (signal processing), a statistic that can be used to examine the relation between two signals or data sets
- Coherence (statistics), a property of self-consistency across a set of assessments, or the strength of association between two series
- Coherence condition in category theory, a collection of conditions requiring that various compositions of elementary morphisms are equal
- Coherency (homotopy theory) in homotopy theory and (higher) category theory
- Coherent sampling, a relationship used in Fast Fourier transforms
- Coherent set of characters in representation theory, a property of sets of characters that allows one to extend an isometry from the degree-zero subspace of a space of characters to the whole space
- Coherent sheaf, a specific class of sheaves having particularly manageable properties closely linked to the geometrical properties of the underlying space
- Mutual coherence (linear algebra), sometimes referred to as coherence, the maximum absolute value of the cross-correlations between the columns of a matrix
- Multi-spectral phase coherence, a generalized nonlinear cross-frequency phase coupling metric introduced by Yang et al., 2016
- Coherence (fairness), a consistency requirement of fair division rules.
- Coherent topology, topology determined by a family of subspaces.

== Philosophy ==
- Coherentism, philosophical theories in modern epistemology, the study of knowledge
- Coherence theory of truth, a theory which regards truth as coherence within some specified set of sentences, propositions or beliefs

== Computer science ==
- Coherence (programming language), an experimental programming language based upon Subtext
- Cache coherence, a special case of memory coherence
- Memory coherence, a concept in computer architecture
- In scrum and agile methodologies, coherence is defined as a measure of the relationships between backlog items which make them worthy of consideration as a whole.

=== IT products ===
- Coherence (software), a component of Parallels Desktop for Mac, the Windows virtualization software
- Coherent (operating system), a UNIX-clone operating system
- Oracle Coherence, an in-memory data grid product from Oracle

== Other uses ==
- Coherence (cognitive science), a property of mental/cognitive states
- Coherence (linguistics), what makes a text semantically meaningful
- Coherence (music theory), a synonym for strict Rothenberg propriety in diatonic set theory
- Coherent optical module, a hot-pluggable optical transceiver implementing a coherent modulation algorithm
- Coherence time (communications systems), duration when a communication channel can be assumed to be constant
- Coherent, Inc., a company specializing in equipment to make and measure coherent light (lasers)
- Coherent risk measure in financial economics, a function that satisfies properties of monotonicity, sub-additivity, homogeneity, and translational invariance
- Coherence (film), a 2013 science fiction film by James Ward Byrkit
- Sense of coherence, a construct in the health theory salutogenesis
- Policy coherence for development, a concept in development cooperation

== See also ==
- Cohesion (disambiguation)
- Mutual coherence (disambiguation)
