= Cohesion =

Cohesion may refer to:

- Cohesion (chemistry), the intermolecular attraction between like-molecules
- Cohesion (computer science), a measure of how closely related elements of a software module are
- Cohesion (geology), the part of shear strength that is independent of the normal effective stress in mass movements
- Cohesion (linguistics), the linguistic elements that make a discourse semantically coherent
- Cohesion (social policy), the bonds between members of a community or society and life
- Cohesion (album), the fourth studio album by Australian band Gyroscope

== See also ==
- Community cohesion
- Structural cohesion
- Cohesion number
- Adhesion (disambiguation)
- Coherence (disambiguation)
