= Mutual coherence =

Mutual coherence can refer to:

- Mutual coherence (physics), sinusoidal waves which exhibit a constant phase relationship
- Mutual coherence (linear algebra), a property of a matrix describing the maximum correlation between its columns

== See also ==
- Coherence (disambiguation)
