= Frightmare (wrestler) =

American professional wrestler

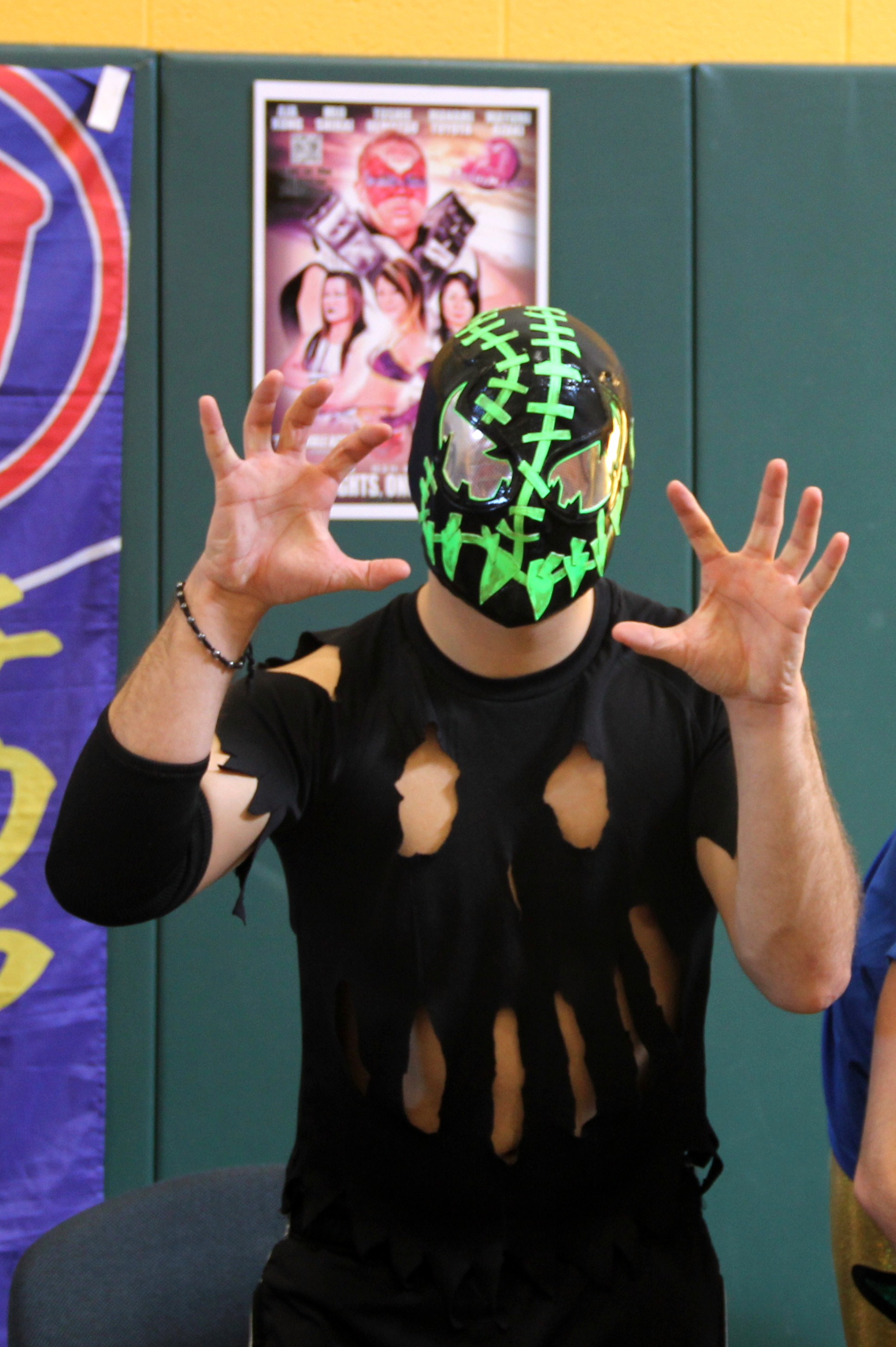
- Frightmare in September 2012

Personal information
- Born: Stephen Delicato; 1990 (age 35–36) Pennsylvania, U.S.

Professional wrestling career
- Ring name: Frightmare
- Billed height: 5 ft 8 in (1.73 m)
- Billed weight: 170 lb (77 kg)
- Billed from: Sleepy Hollow
- Trained by: Chris Hero; Claudio Castagnoli; Mike Quackenbush
- Debut: November 21, 2008

Stephen Delicato (born 1990) is an American professional wrestler, better known under his ring name Frightmare. currently performs on the independent circuit. He is best known for his time in Chikara professional wrestling promotion, where he was a former Young Lions Cup Champion and Evolve Wrestling. He is also previous working for promotions such as International Wrestling Cartel (IWC), IWA East Coast, Synergy Professional Wrestling and Jersey All Pro Wrestling (JAPW).

== Professional wrestling career ==
Frightmare received his training from Mike Quackenbush, Chris Hero and Claudio Castagnoli at the Chikara Wrestle Factory, where he was trained on the ninth term of the school, the last term taught by Hero.

=== Chikara (2008–2020) ===
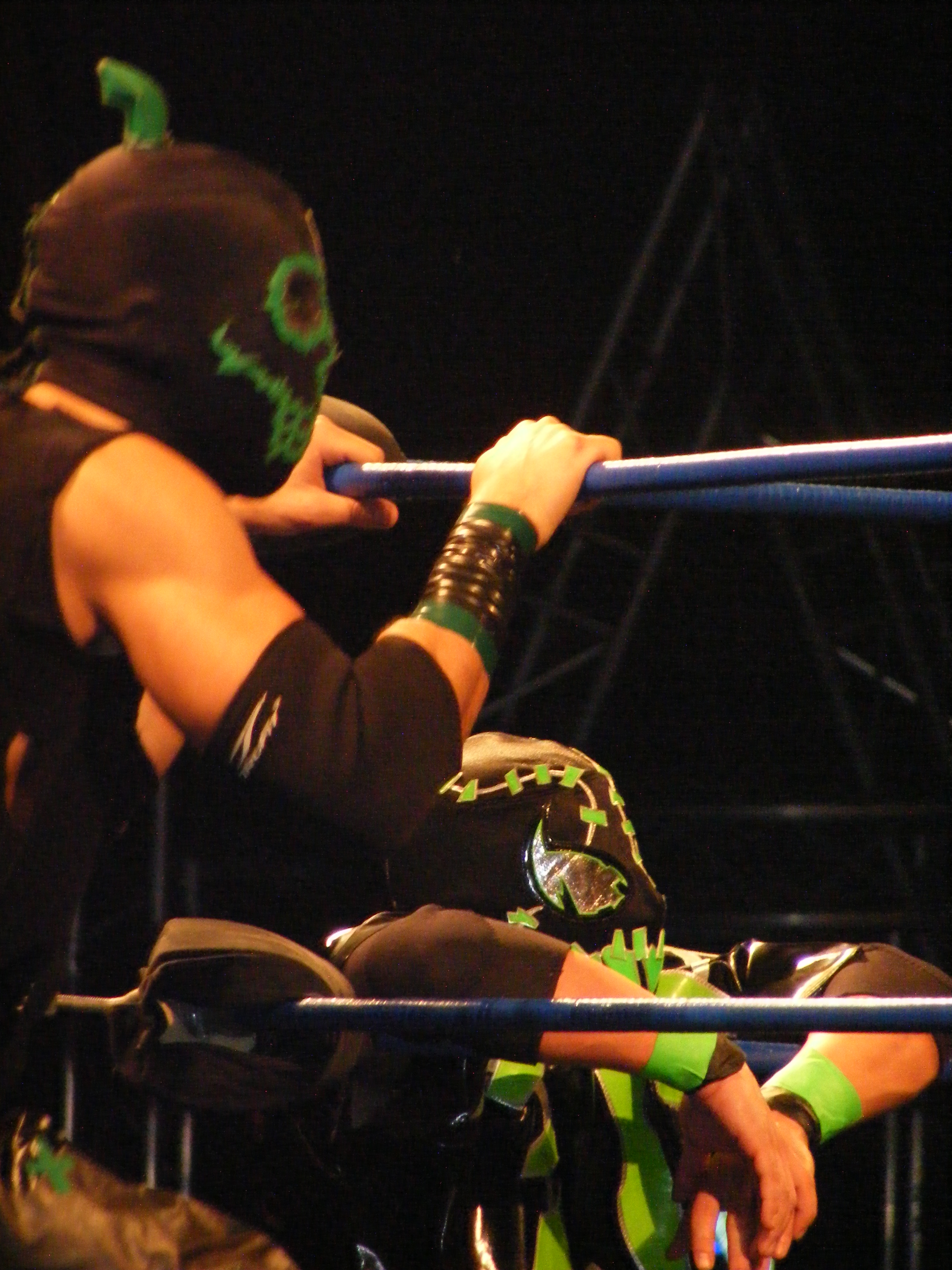
Hallowicked and Frightmare in May 2009

Frightmare made his Chikara debut on November 16, 2008, accompanying Hallowicked and Delirious to the ring on a chain leash. After making his in-ring debut on November 21 at a National Wrestling Superstars event, Frightmare made his Chikara in-ring debut on December 12, when he came to defend his mentor in his feud against Brodie Lee, only to lose the match in four minutes. On January 25, Frightmare picked up his first victory, pinning Grizzly Redwood in a tag team match, where he and Hallowicked faced Redwood and Brodie Lee. The following day, Lee defeated Frightmare in a singles rematch. On March 27, Frightmare, Hallowicked and Delirious, the trio known collectively as Incoherence, entered the 2009 King of Trios tournament, but were defeated in the opening round by The Masters of a Thousand Holds (Mike Quackenbush, Johnny Saint and Jorge "Skayde" Rivera). On April 26, Incoherence faced the Roughnecks (Brodie Lee, Eddie Kingston and Grizzly Redwood) in a six-man tag team match, where Frightmare scored a major upset by pinning Lee. However, after the match, Incoherence suffered a major loss, when UltraMantis Black and Crossbones kidnapped Delirious, who would return the following month, aligned with them as the third member of the Order of the Neo-Solar Temple. On November 22, Incoherence and the Order of the Neo–Solar Temple faced each other for the first time, with Delirious and UltraMantis Black coming out victorious, when Delirious pinned Frightmare. Frightmare's first year in wrestling was capped off, when the highly acclaimed Wrestling Observer Newsletter named him 2009's Rookie of the Year.

In 2010, Incoherence began feuding with Bruderschaft des Kreuzes (BDK). The first match of the feud on February 28 ended when BDK members Sara Del Rey and Daizee Haze were disqualified for excessive punishment on Frightmare, giving Incoherence their first point in the process. In Chikara, tag teams need three points in order to challenge for the Campeonatos de Parejas (Tag Team Championship). For the 2010 King of Trios Frightmare and Hallowicked teamed with Mike Quackenbush to form Team Frightning. Despite their status as one of the favorites of the tournament, the team was eliminated in the first round by Team Big Japan Wrestling (Daisuke Sekimoto, Kankuro Hoshino and Yuji Okabayashi), when Okabayashi forced Frightmare to tap out. On the second night of the tournament, Frightmare entered the Rey de Voladores ("King of the Fliers") tournament, but was defeated in his opening round four-way elimination match by Ophidian, who would go on to win the entire tournament. On the third and final night of the tournament Incoherence entered a ten tag team gauntlet match. During the match Incoherence eliminated first Team F.I.S.T. (Icarus and Gran Akuma), then the Order of the Neo-Solar Temple (UltraMantis Black and Crossbones) and finally Sara Del Rey and Daizee Haze of BDK to earn their second, third and fourth point respectively. After the tournament Chikara announced that Incoherence would challenge for the Campeonatos de Parejas, held by BDK's Claudio Castagnoli and Ares, on May 23 at Chikara's eight-year anniversary show. At Aniversario Elf Incoherence was defeated in their two out of three falls title match in two straight falls, thanks to a pre–match assault from BDK's newest member Delirious and some shady officiating from the stable's own referee, Derek Sabato.

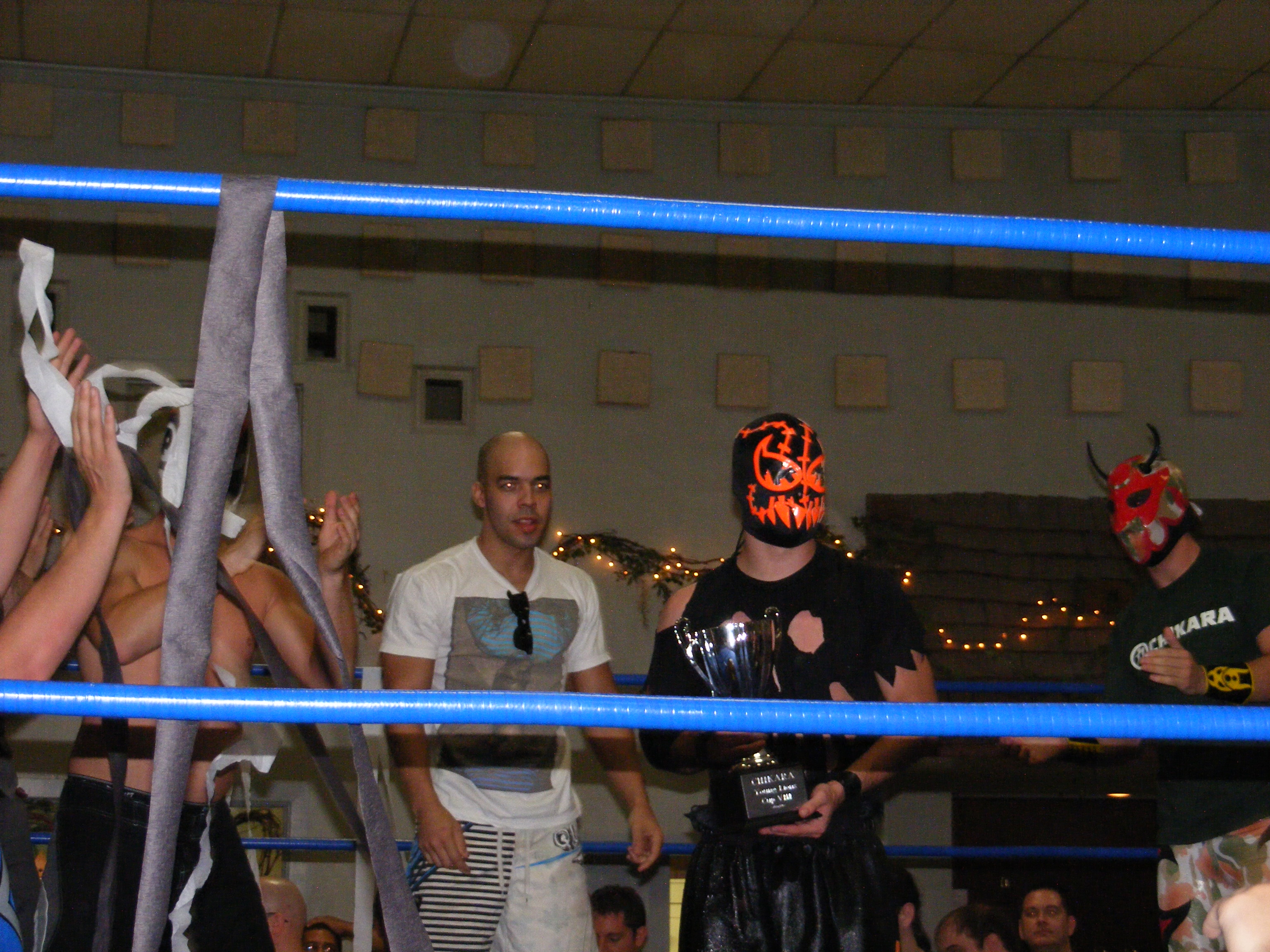
Chikara locker room celebrating Frightmare's Young Lions Cup victory over BDK's Lince Dorado

After managing to pin Crossbones in an eight-man tag team match on March 20, Mike Quackenbush suggested that Frightmare should start going after the Young Lions Cup. Frightmare received his shot at the Cup on June 26, but was defeated when the champion, BDK member Tim Donst, choked him out with a necktie. On August 27, Frightmare entered the eighth annual Young Lions Cup tournament, defeating Brendan Michael Thomas, who had eliminated him from the tournament the previous year, in his first round match. Later that same night, he defeated Christian Abel, Kaio, Amasis, Johnny Gargano and Akira Tozawa in a six-way elimination match to advance to the finals of the tournament. On August 29 Frightmare defeated BDK member Lince Dorado to win the eighth Young Lions Cup tournament and score Chikara's first major victory in its war against BDK. Frightmare made his first successful defense of the Young Lions Cup on September 19, defeating BDK's Pinkie Sanchez. On October 23 Frightmare successfully defended the Young Lions Cup against Johnny Gargano, who cashed in his "Golden Opportunity" to get a title match. The following week Frightmare made his first tour of Japan with Osaka Pro Wrestling. On December 12, 2010, at the season nine finale, Reality is Relative, Incoherence aligned themselves with Hallowicked's long–time rival UltraMantis Black by saving him from Sinn Bodhi and The Batiri. On March 13, 2011, Frightmare broke Max Boyer's record from 2006 for most successful defenses of the Young Lions Cup, when he defeated Batiri member Obariyon to make his sixth successful defense. On April 15, Frightmare, Hallowicked and UltraMantis Black, now known collectively as the Spectral Envoy, were eliminated from the 2011 King of Trios in the first round by Team Dragon Gate (Akira Tozawa, Kagetora and Super Shisa). On June 26, Frightmare defeated Batiri member Kodama to make his seventh and final Young Lions Cup defense. On August 27, he was stripped of the title in time for the ninth annual Young Lions Cup tournament. The Spectral Envoy and the Dark Army (Sinn Bodhi, Kobald, Kodama and Obariyon) faced each other in an eight-man tag team match on September 18, when the former was joined by UltraMantis Black's former Order of the Neo-Solar Temple partner Crossbones. The Spectral Envoy managed to win the match, after Ultramantis pinned Bodhi. Afterwards, Frightmare was sidelined for the next eight months with an injury, before returning on May 20, 2012, during Chikara's tenth anniversary weekend. On September 14, Frightmare, Hallowicked and UltraMantis Black entered the 2012 King of Trios, defeating Mihara, The Mysterious and Handsome Stranger and Tito Santana in their first round match. The following day, the Spectral Envoy advanced to the semifinals of the tournament, after defeating their rival team The Batiri. However, following the match, the Spectral Envoy was attacked by members of The Batiri and Ophidian. On the third and final day of the tournament, the Spectral Envoy first defeated F.I.S.T. (Chuck Taylor, Icarus and Johnny Gargano) in the semifinals and then Team ROH (Mike Bennett, Matt Jackson and Nick Jackson) in the finals, despite interference from The Batiri, Delirious and Ophidian, to win the 2012 King of Trios. On December 2 at Chikara's third internet pay-per-view, Under the Hood, the Spectral Envoy, represented by Frightmare, Hallowicked, UltraMantis Black and the returning Blind Rage and Crossbones, defeated The Batiri, Delirious and Ophidian in a ten-man tag team match.

After a one-year hiatus, Chikara returned on May 25, 2014, with the You Only Live Twice internet pay-per-view. The Spectral Envoy worked the event's first match, where they were defeated by the new BDK of Ares, Nøkken and Tursas. On September 19, The Spectral Envoy entered the 2014 King of Trios as the defending tournament winners. They were, however, eliminated in their first-round match by Eddie Kingston, Jimmy Jacobs and Volgar, representing Chikara's new top rudo stable The Flood, after their stablemate Deucalion brought out Delirious to attack UltraMantis. On December 6 at Tomorrow Never Dies, Delirious used the supposedly magical artifact Eye of Tyr to brainwash Frightmare and Hallowicked into turning against UltraMantis Black, breaking up the Spectral Envoy. When Chikara's season 15 started on January 25, 2015, Frightmare and Hallowicked worked as rudos, separated from UltraMantis Black. Early in the year, Frightmare entered the Challenge of the Immortals tournament as part of Hallowicked's "Nightmare Warriors" team, alongside Blind Rage and Silver Ant. Frightmare, Hallowicked and Silver Ant also represented the Nightmare Warriors in September's King of Trios, where they made it to the quarterfinals, before losing to eventual tournament winners, Team AAA (Aero Star, Drago and Fénix). On January 30, 2016, at the season 16 premiere, Frightmare and Hallowicked unsuccessfully challenged N_R_G (Hype Rockwell and Race Jaxon) for the Campeonatos de Parejas. During the first half of 2016, Frightmare became part of Hallowicked's new rudo group, serving an entity known as "Nazmaldun". As part of the group, Frightmare became known as "The Spear of Nazmaldun". Chikara's season 16 concluded on December 3 with two shows. In the main event of the first show, Frightmare defeated Amasis in a Mask vs. Mask match, forcing his opponent to unmask himself.

=== Evolve (2010–2011) ===
On January 16, 2010, Frightmare made his debut for Evolve Wrestling, at the promotion's first ever show, teaming with Hallowicked and Mike Quackenbush in a six-man tag team match, where they defeated Akuma's Army (Gran Akuma, Icarus and Brodie Lee). On May 13 at the promotion's second show, Frightmare and Hallowicked competed in a four-way tag team match, which was won by The Osirian Portal (Amasis and Ophidian). On September 11 at Evolve 5, Frightmare competed in a six-way match, which was won by Johnny Gargano. Frightmare returned to Evolve on April 19, 2011, at the promotion's first live internet pay-per-view, where he teamed with Jigsaw to defeat Facade and Jason Gory in a tag team match.

=== Independent circuit (2019–present) ===
On January 26, 2019, Frightmare defeated Matt Tremont and Drake Chambers in a Triple Threat Match to become Synergy Pro Wrestling Champion. Wrestling with partner Hallowicked as the Legion of Rot, the pair competed in the 2019 Dream Tag Team Invitational (DTTI) in the United Kingdom. During this event, Frightmare broke his elbow and as such, was forced to relinquish the Synergy Pro Wrestling Championship at Synergy's next live event. Frightmare regained the title on November 27, 2019, becoming the first 2-time Champion in Synergy Pro Wrestling history.

== Championships and accomplishments ==
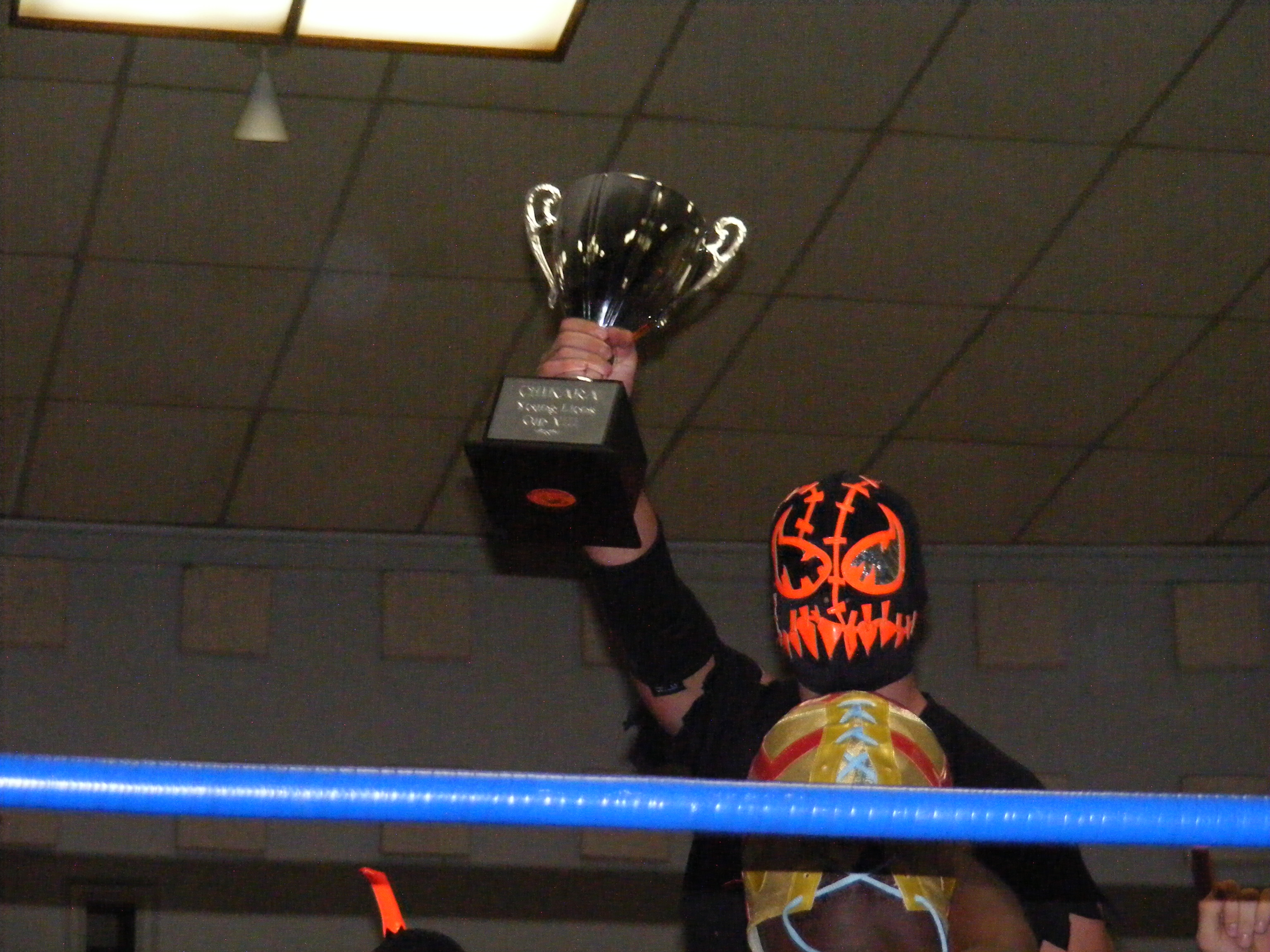
Frightmare holding the Chikara Young Lions Cup

- Blitzkrieg! Pro
  - B!P Tag Team Championship (2 times) – with Hallowicked
- Chikara
  - Young Lions Cup VIII (1 time)
  - King of Trios (2012) – with Hallowicked and UltraMantis Black
- Chile Lucha Libre
  - Torneo de Parejas (2013) – with Bajo Cero
- NWA Force One Pro Wrestling
  - NWA Force 1 Heritage Championship (1 time)
- Pro Wrestling Illustrated
  - Ranked No. 294 of the top 500 singles wrestlers in the PWI 500 in 2017
- Synergy Professional Wrestling
  - Synergy Pro Wrestling Champion (2 times)
- Wrestling Observer Newsletter
  - Rookie of the Year (2009)

=== Luchas de Apuestas record ===
Winner (wager)	Loser (wager)	Location	Event	Date	Notes
Frightmare (mask)	Amasis (mask)	Chicago, Illinois	Temple of Doom	December 3, 2016	
