= Multi-spectral phase coherence =

Multi-spectral phase coherence (MSPC) is a generalized cross-frequency coupling metric introduced by Yang and colleagues in 2016. MSPC can be used to quantify nonlinear phase coupling between a set of base frequencies and their harmonic/intermodulation frequencies. MSPC is a model-free method, which can provide a system description, including (i) the order of the nonlinearity, (ii) the direction of interaction, (iii) the time delay in the system, and both (iv) harmonic and (v) intermodulation coupling.

The MSPC is defined as:

$$\Psi(f_i,a_i) = \left\langle \exp \left( j\left(\sum_i a_i\varphi(f_i) -\varphi \left(f_\text{sum}\right)\right) \right) \right\rangle$$

where $\varphi(f_i)$ is the phase at frequency $f_i$, $a_i$ is the weight of $f_i$ to a harmonic/intermodulation frequency $f_\text{sum} = \sum_i a_if_i$), and $\langle \cdot \rangle$ represents the average over realizations.

Bi-phase locking value, also called bi-phase coherence in the literature, is a special case of MSPC when $a_1=a_2=1$, $i = 1, 2.$

The time-delay can be estimated from the phase lag when MSPC is computed between signals.
