= Chikara Young Lions Cup =

Professional wrestling championship

Young Lions Cup
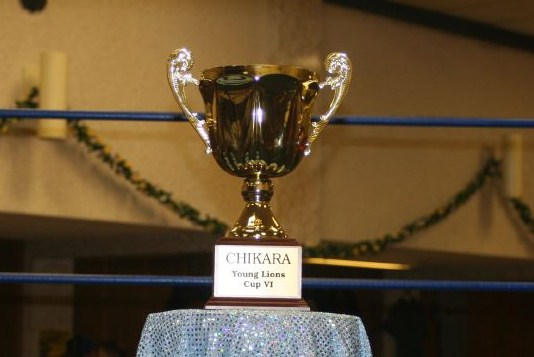
- The Young Lions Cup awarded to the winner of the Young Lions Cup VI tournament

Details
- Promotion: Chikara; WiF!
- Date established: November 16, 2002
- Date retired: June 24, 2020
Statistics
- First champion(s): Hallowicked
- Final champion(s): Ricky South
- Longest reign: Hallowicked (602 days)
- Shortest reign: Sylverhawk (14 days)
- Oldest champion: Tadasuke (25 years, 226 days)
- Youngest champion: Helios (19 years)
- Heaviest champion: Tadasuke (227 lb (103 kg))
- Lightest champion: Heidi Lovelace (132 lb (60 kg))

The Young Lions Cup was a professional wrestling championship contested for in the American professional wrestling promotion Chikara.

== History ==
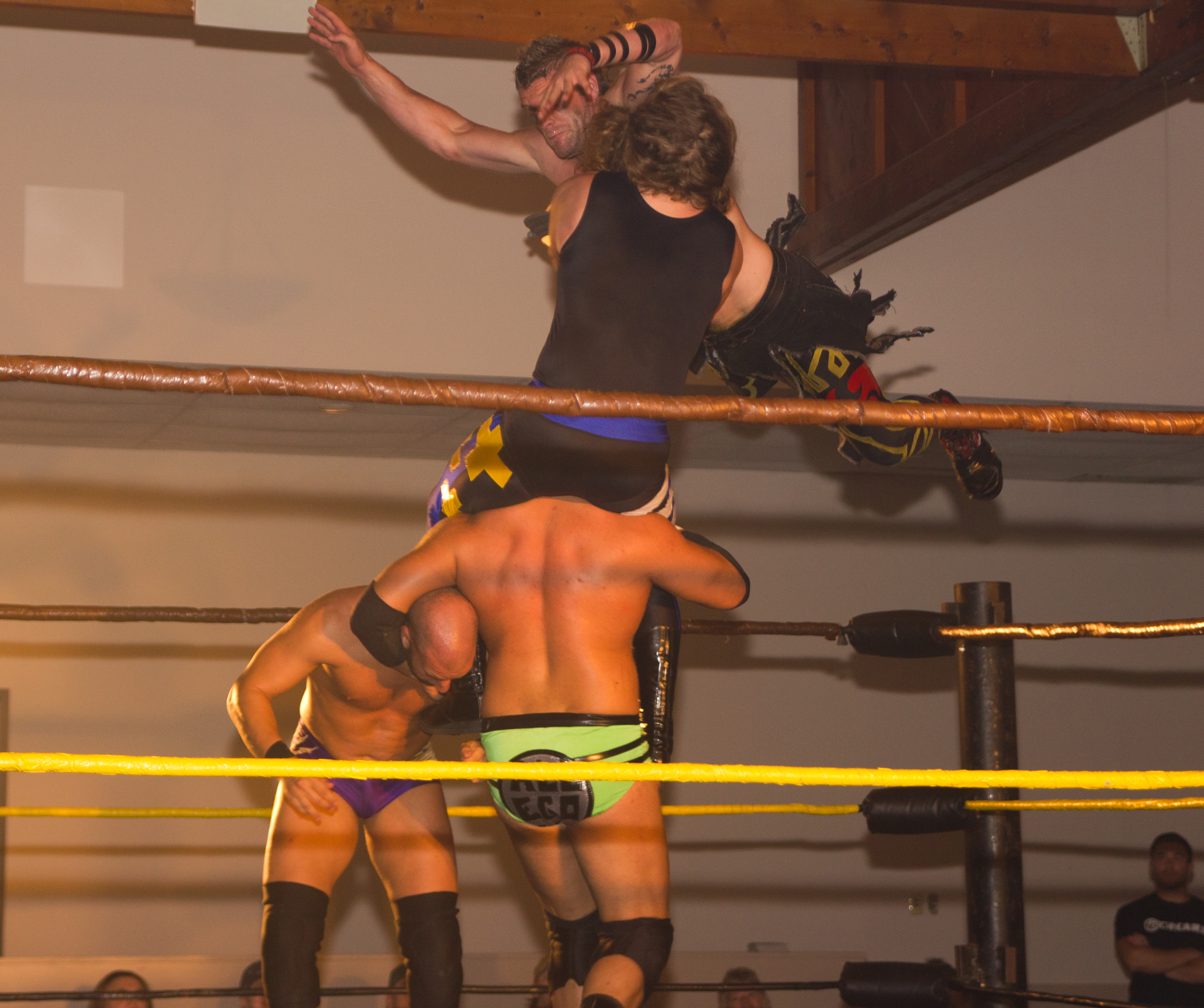
Action from the first qualifying match of the 2012 Young Lions Cup tournament

A tournament is held every year to determine the champion. Originally, experience level was the primary basis for eligibility in the tournament, as the first tournament was only open to those who have wrestled under 50 professional matches. The primary basis for eligibility was later changed to age, making the tournament open only to wrestlers who are 25 years old or younger. The winner of the Young Lions Cup can defend the cup as an actual title until the following tournament, and Young Lions Cup tournament winners are not allowed to compete in the tournament again once they win it.

The original rules also once stated that previous holders of the cup are not allowed to compete for the title once they are no longer champion, but this rule was 'changed' in 2008. Fire Ant was granted a rematch after losing the cup to Vin Gerard, and Director of Fun Leonard F. Chikarason claimed that the rules were now amended, stating that previous holders of the cup could challenge for the cup again any time they wanted until the next Young Lions Cup tournament. However, on February 1, 2010, new Director of Fun Dieter VonSteigerwalt reverted the rule change and announced that former champions could no longer challenge for the cup or enter the annual tournaments.

Though Chikara's one-year hiatus ended in May 2014, the title was never mentioned for a prolonged period. On September 18, it was announced that an eleventh tournament would be done and hosted by Chikara's sister promotion, Wrestling is Fun! (WiF!), from October 11 to November 1. The finals of the tournament took place on December 6 at Tomorrow Never Dies and saw Heidi Lovelace become the first female holder of the title.

The title has been deactivated following the closure of Chikara in June, 2020. There have been a total of 28 cup winners over a total of 16 cups, some of them winning the same cup on more than one occasion and three vacancies. The first holder was Hallowicked and the last one was Ricky South until the closure of the promotion.

== Title history ==
No.	Wrestler:	Cup:	Date:	Days held:	Location:	Successful defenses	Notes:	Ref.
1	Hallowicked	I	November 16, 2002	602	Allentown, PA	4	Defeated Mister Zero in the finals of the Young Lions Cup tournament.	
—	Vacated		July 10, 2004					
2	Larry Sweeney	II	July 31, 2004	111	Emmaus, PA	0	Defeated Jigsaw in the finals of the Young Lions Cup II tournament.	
3	Jigsaw	II	November 19, 2004	245	Reading, PA	4	Defeated Larry Sweeney at Fear of Music.	
—	Vacated		July 22, 2005					
4	Shane Storm	III	July 24, 2005	334	Pittston, PA	2	Defeated Icarus in the finals of the Young Lions Cup III tournament.	
—	Vacated		June 23, 2006					
5	Arik Cannon	IV	June 25, 2006	125	Philadelphia, PA	3	Defeated Cheech in the finals of the Young Lions Cup IV tournament.	
6	Max Boyer	IV	October 28, 2006	237	Philadelphia, PA	5	Defeated Arik Cannon at Cibernetico Forever.	
—	Vacated		June 22, 2007					
7	Chuck Taylor	V	June 24, 2007	125	Hellertown, PA	2	Defeated Ricochet in the finals of the Young Lions Cup V tournament.	
8	Helios	V	October 27, 2007	230	Barnesville, PA	3	Defeated Chuck Taylor at New Star Navigation.	
—	Vacated		June 13, 2008					
9	Fire Ant	VI	June 15, 2008	28	Hellertown, PA	0	Defeated Vin Gerard in the finals of the Young Lions Cup VI tournament.	
10	Vin Gerard	VI	July 13, 2008	154	Philadelphia, PA	4	Defeated Fire Ant at Tragedy and Triumph.	
—	Vacated	VI	December 14, 2008	—	N/A	N/A	Gerard was stripped of the cup and it was declared vacant following a double disqualification between him and Jimmy Olsen at Duel and Duality.	
11	Equinox (II)	VI	January 25, 2009	201	Philadelphia, PA	2	Defeated Vin Gerard in a ladder match for the vacant cup at Revelation X.	
—	Vacated		August 14, 2009					
12	Player Dos	VII	August 16, 2009	168	Philadelphia, PA	3	Defeated Colin Delaney in the finals of the Young Lions Cup VII tournament.	
13	Tim Donst	VII	January 31, 2010	208	Philadelphia, PA	4	Defeated Player Dos at A Touch of Class.	
—	Vacated		August 27, 2010					
14	Frightmare	VIII	August 29, 2010	363	Reading, PA	7	Defeated Lince Dorado in the finals of the Young Lions Cup VIII tournament.	
—	Vacated		August 27, 2011					
15	Tadasuke	IX	August 27, 2011	301	Easton, PA	2	Defeated Green Ant of The Colony in the finals of the Young Lions Cup IX tournament.	
—	Vacated		June 23, 2012					
16	Mark Angelosetti	X	August 18, 2012	288	Indianapolis, IN	6	Defeated ACH in the finals of the Young Lions Cup X tournament.	
—	Vacated		June 2, 2013					
17	Heidi Lovelace	XI	December 6, 2014	427	Philadelphia, PA	2	Defeated Missile Assault Ant in the finals of the Young Lions Cup XI tournament.	
—	Vacated		February 6, 2016					
18	The Estonian ThunderFrog/ Super ThunderFrog	XII	February 6, 2016	364	Reading, PA	4	Defeated Wani in the finals of the Young Lions Cup XII tournament. Won the championship as The Estonian ThunderFrog but defended it as Super ThunderFrog at F1RST Wrestling Wrestlepalooza VIII against Space Monkey and Wildcat.	
—	Vacated		February 4, 2017					
19	Space Monkey	XIII	February 4, 2017	56	Philadelphia, PA	0	Defeated The Whisper in the finals of the Young Lions Cup XIII tournament.	
20	Wani	XIII	April 1, 2017	64	Fern Park, FL	0	Defeated Space Monkey at Bad Wolf.	
21	Sylverhawk	XIII	June 4, 2017	14	Philadelphia, PA	1	Defeated Wani at Hour of Power - S.18.4.	
22	Hermit Crab	XIII	June 18, 2017	35	Philadelphia, PA	1	Defeated Sylverhawk at The Johnny Kidd Invitational.	
23	Razerhawk	XIII	July 23, 2017	84	Philadelphia, PA	1	Defeated Hermit Crab at Hour of Power - S.18.5.	
24	Ophidian (II) / The Whisper	XIII	October 15, 2017	153	Philadelphia, PA	2	Defeated Razerhawk at Hour of Power - S.18.7. Won the championship as Ophidian but defended it as The Whisper against Tony Deppen at CHIKARA National Pro Wrestling Day 2018.	
—	Vacated		March 17, 2018					
25	Cam Zagami	XIV	March 31, 2018	105	Philadelphia, PA	1	Defeated Omari in the finals of the Young Lions Cup XIV tournament.	
26	Danjerhawk	XIV	July 14, 2018	245	Philadelphia, PA	3	Defeated Cam Zagami at Clan Feuds.	
—	Vacated	XIV	March 16, 2019	—	N/A	N/A	The cup was declared vacant on March 16, 2019.	
27	Still Life with Apricots and Pears	XV	March 16, 2019	308	Philadelphia, PA	10	Defeated Boomer Hatfield in the finals of the Young Lions Cup XV tournament.	
—	Vacated	XIV	January 18, 2020	—	N/A	N/A	The cup was declared vacant on January 18, 2020.	
28	Ricky South	XVI	January 18, 2020	158	Philadelphia, PA	0	Defeated Green Ant in the finals of the Young Lions Cup XVI tournament.	
—	Deactivated	XVI	June 24, 2020	—	N/A	N/A	Deactivated when Chikara closed down.	

== Cup reigns ==
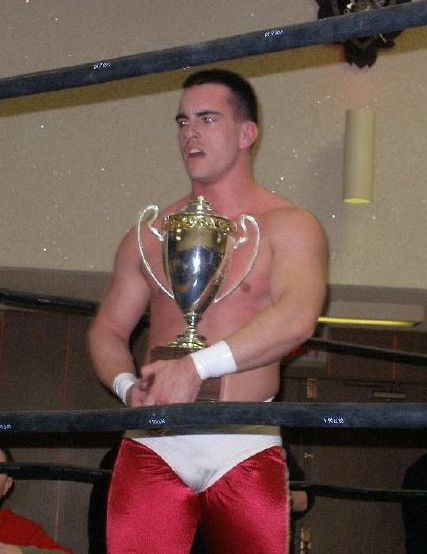
Max Boyer with the cup in 2006

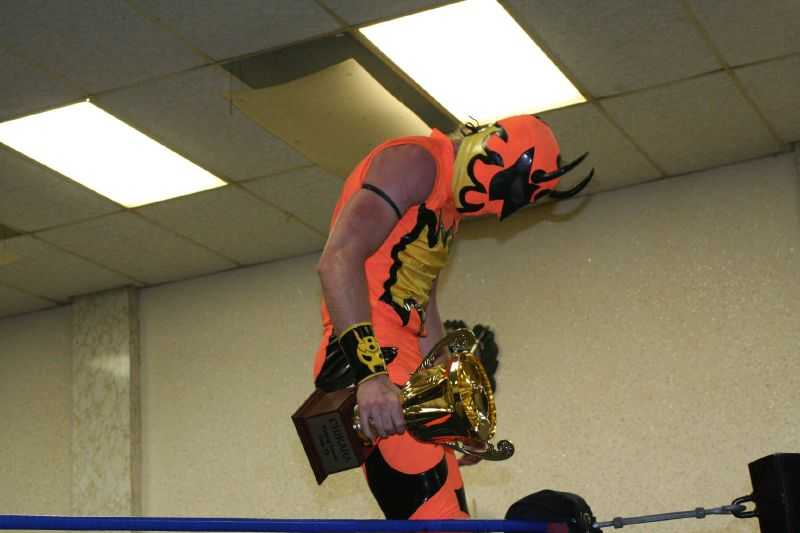
Fire Ant with the cup in 2008

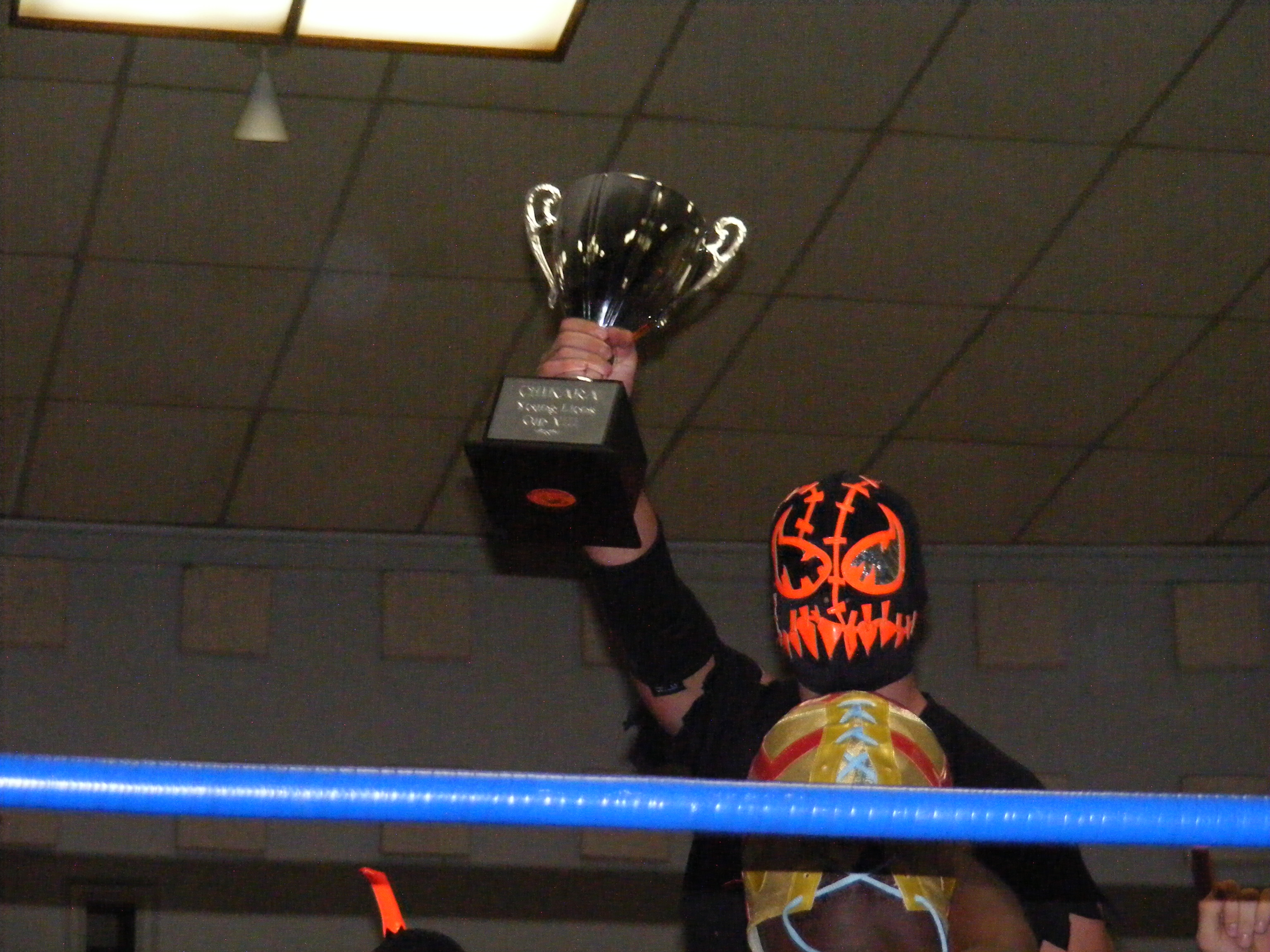
Frightmare with the cup in 2010

Rank	Wrestler	No. of cup	Combined defenses	Combined days
1	Hallowicked	I	4	602
2	Heidi Lovelace	XI	2	429
3	The Estonian ThunderFrog	XII	4	364
4	Frightmare	VIII	7	363
5	Shane Storm	III	2	334
6	Still Life with Apricots and Pears	XV	10	308
7	Tadasuke	IX	2	301
8	Mark Angelosetti	X	6	288
9	Danjerhawk	XIV	3	245
9	Jigsaw	II	4	245
11	Max Boyer	IV	5	237
12	Helios	V	3	230
13	Tim Donst	VII	4	208
14	Equinox II	VI	2	201
15	Player Dos	VII	3	168
16	Ophidian II/The Whisper	XIII	2	167
17	Ricky South	XVI	0	158
18	Vin Gerard	VI	4	154
19	Arik Cannon	IV	3	125
19	Chuck Taylor	V	2	125
21	Larry Sweeney	II	0	111
22	Cam Zagami	XIV	3	105
23	Razerhawk	XIII	1	84
24	Wani	XIII	0	64
25	Space Monkey	XIII	0	56
26	Hermit Crab	XIII	1	35
27	Fire Ant	VI	0	28
28	Sylverhawk	XIII	1	14

== See also ==
- Chikara Campeonatos de Parejas
- Chikara Grand Championship
