= Adhesion (disambiguation) =

Adhesion is the tendency of certain dissimilar molecules to cling together.

Adhesion may also refer to:

== Biology ==
- Adhesion (medicine), a fibrous band that forms between tissues and organs
- Cell adhesion, the binding of a cell to another cell or to a surface or matrix
- Focal adhesion, a type of macromolecular assembly in cell biology
- Interthalamic adhesion, a band connecting the brain's two thalami
- Adhesion barrier

== Other ==
- Rail adhesion, a type of railway
- Adhesion contract, in law
- Adhesion (Politics)

== See also ==
- Adhesive
- Cohesion (disambiguation)
