= Tim Donst =

American professional wrestler

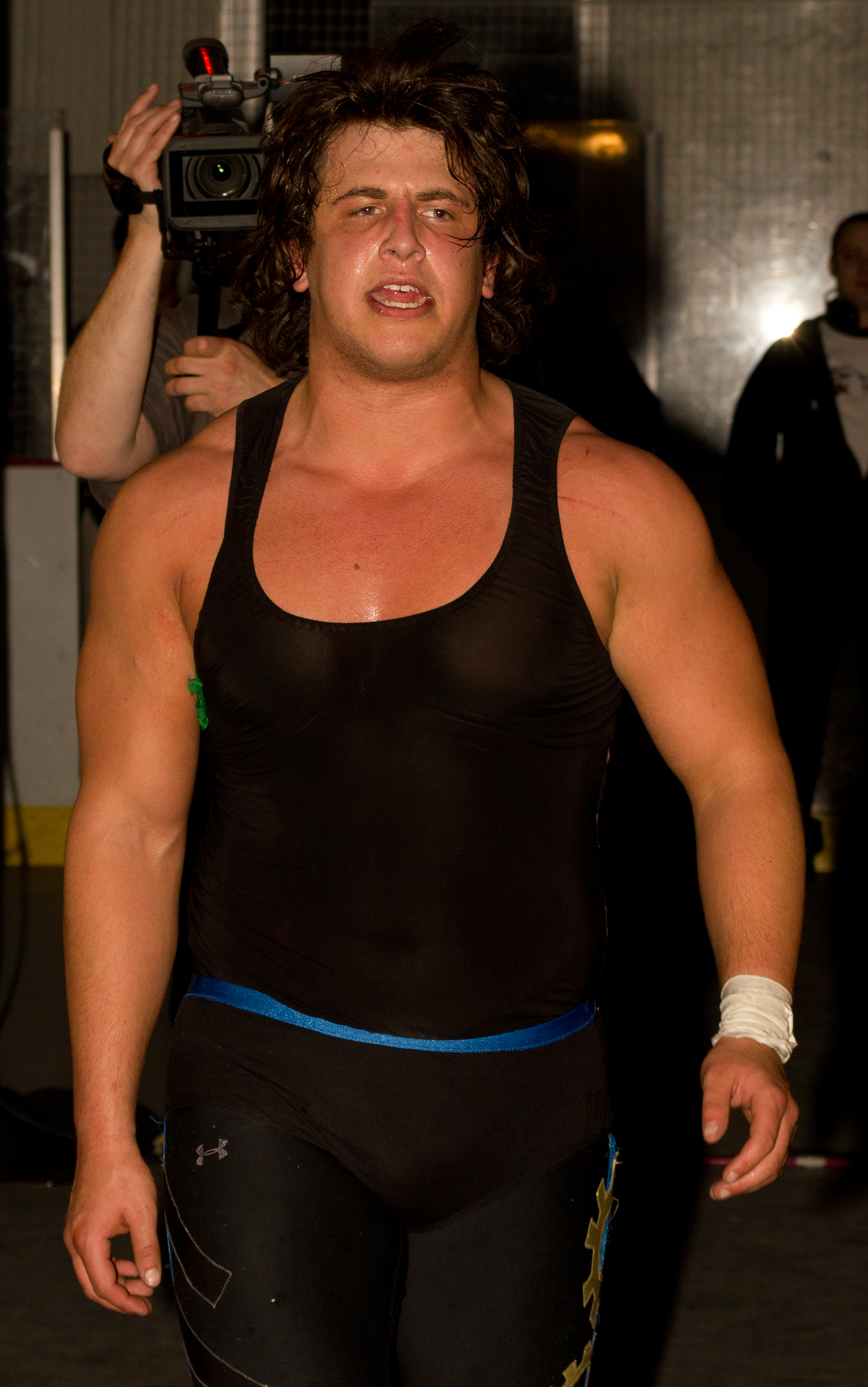
- Donst in 2012

Personal information
- Born: Michael Hopes; October 17, 1987 (age 38) St. Louis, Missouri

Professional wrestling career
- Ring name(s): Tim Donst; Vökoder
- Billed height: 5 ft 10 in (1.78 m)
- Billed weight: 241 lb (109 kg)
- Trained by: Chikara; Mike Quackenbush; Chris Hero; Skayde
- Debut: April 22, 2007

Michael Hopes (born October 17, 1987) is an American professional wrestler, better known under the ring name Tim Donst. currently performing on the independent circuit. He is best known for his time in Absolute Intense Wrestling (AIW), Chikara and Dragon Gate USA. He is known for his amateur wrestling background, which became the focal point of his gimmick. He is a former two-time AIW Absolute Champion and holder of the Young Lions Cup.

== Professional wrestling career ==
=== Chikara (2007–2013) ===
Hopes started out his career by training in Chikara's training facility under the tutelage of Claudio Castagnoli and Mike Quackenbush. He made his debut under the ring name Tim Donst in 2007 at Rey de Voladores in a trios match, which had his team end up on the losing end. This would continue for a while, as he would lose to many more opponents, slowly building some steam, before the match got him noticed against Eddie Kingston, who dished out vicious punishment that Donst would survive through, and keep coming back, but still lost. The effort gave him a strong fan base.

Following that, he moved on to gain his first victory over Alex Payne, then established himself as a tecnico, confronting other big challenges with tenacity, even breaking his nose.

In April 2008, Donst was dropped on his head via a Praying Mantis Bomb from UltraMantis Black. He followed Mantis and the rest of the Order of the Neo Solar Temple to the back and would appear with them for the next few shows, eventually donning facepaint and being called the "Chosen One" of the Order. What emerged was that Donst had lost his memory and had been convinced by UltraMantis that he was a true member of the Order. During his stint with the Neo Solar Temple, he and Hydra formed a tag team and amassed the three points required for a shot at the Campeonatos de Parejas.

On June 14, during a tag match between Mike Quackenbush and Shane Storm and the Super Smash Brothers, Tim Donst made his way to ringside and whispered something to Mike Quackenbush, which led him to attack Storm after winning the match. It was revealed that Donst's entire stint with the Order had been a setup between him and Quackenbush to infiltrate the rudo faction in Chikara to discover who in the tecnicos had revealed the counter to the Chikara Special, which turned out to be Storm. He left the Order, and Hydra would end up coming with him, and their team officially became known as the Sea Donsters. They feuded with the Order for the remainder of the year, and when the Donsters cashed in their three points and challenged the Campeones Incoherence on August 9, the Order cost them the match. The Donsters defeated them decisively in a tag match on December 12, and Hydra won a singles match against UltraMantis the next night, settling the feud.

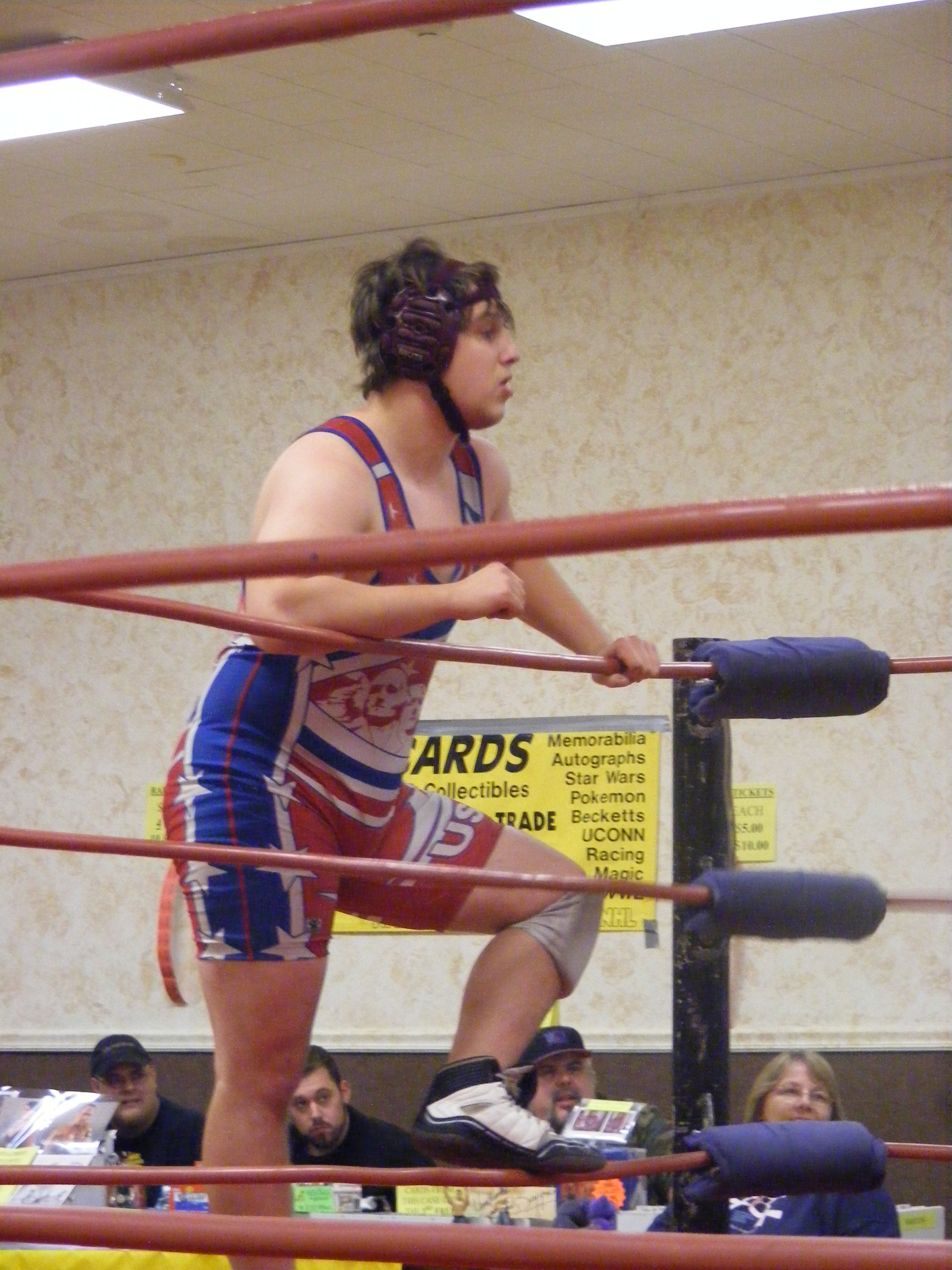
Donst on the ring apron in 2008

The same night Hydra beat UltraMantis, Donst wrestled in a tag match with Mike Quackenbush against STIGMA (the former Shane Storm) and Colin Delaney of the UnStable. STIGMA dropped him on his head during the match and knocked him out, requiring him to be sent to the back (a returning Jigsaw took his place afterwards), and STIGMA even stole his wrestling headgear, starting a new feud. It ended on May 23, 2009, where he beat STIGMA with the Chikara Special and took back his headgear.

One night later, dissention started brewing within the Sea Donsters when they lost to the team 2.0, with Hydra taking the fall. Donst became angry with Hydra for that loss, as well as a few other recent losses they had suffered in the tag team division. After losing to Hydra in a Young Lions Cup qualifying match on August 14, and then Hydra taking the fall in a trios match two nights later, Donst attacked Hydra following the loss, becoming a rudo in the process. He later explained that he was tired of being undervalued by the tecnicos, specifically Mike Quackenbush, and he told Hydra that he was nothing more than comic relief while he was with the Order, and when they teamed together, it made him look like a joke as well. He vowed to destroy him and then take the Young Lions Cup by any means necessary.

He got a match with Hydra on September 12, but he attacked and viciously beat his former partner before the match even started. When the match finally did start, he won in sixteen seconds by making Hydra submit. The next night, he jumped Hydra and beat him up again, prompting Director of Fun Leonard F. Chikarason to suspend him for sixty days. A month later, Hydra challenged him to a Loser Leaves Chikara Match for the November 21 show, which he accepted. Donst won the match after low blowing Hydra while distracting the referee.

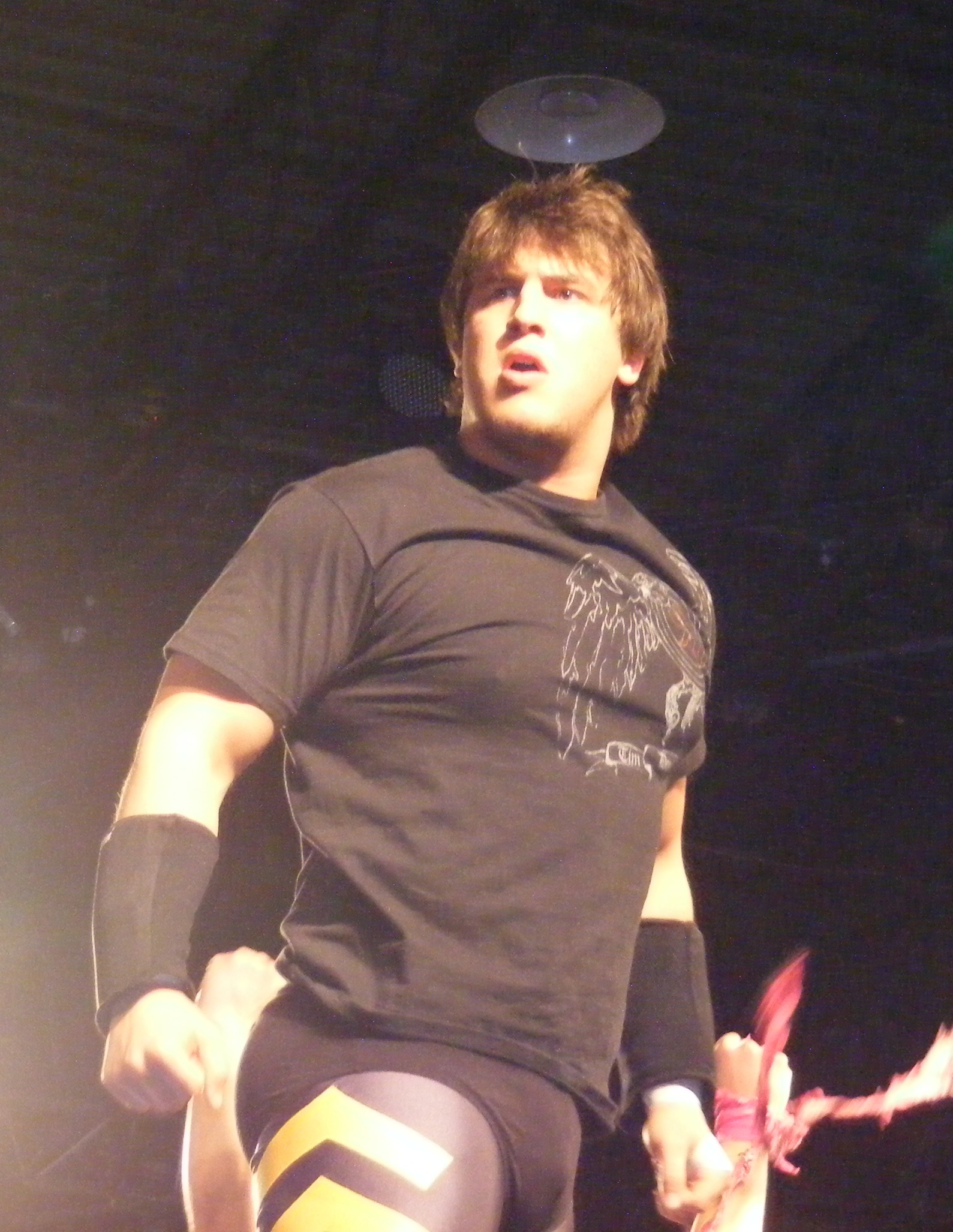
Donst representing Bruderschaft des Kreuzes in April 2010

The following night at the end of the show, the BDK duo that had been pestering UltraMantis Black and the Order of the Neo Solar Temple for the Eye of Tyr for some time came into the ring. They called out UltraMantis, and he gave the Eye to his newest recruit Vökoder - a masked man who had debuted at the Young Lions Cup Tournament back in August and became a member of the Order - and entered the ring to confront them. After one of them revealed himself to be Ares, and he, the still-masked other BDK member, Claudio Castagnoli, Carpenter Ant (who later unmasked to reveal he was Pinkie Sanchez), Sara Del Rey and Daizee Haze started to beat down members of the tecnico roster who came to ringside, Vökoder beat down UltraMantis and returned the Eye to Ares. When the new group of aforementioned wrestlers came together in the ring, Vökoder unmasked and revealed himself to be Tim Donst all along. He then joined the new group, which became known as Bruderschaft des Kreuzes. Jumping to BDK, Donst took with him the inverted Chikara Special, a supposedly unbreakable submission maneuver Quackenbush had taught him as a token of gratitude for infiltrating the Order. On January 31, 2010, at the season nine premiere, Donst used the move to defeat Player Dos to win the Chikara Young Lions Cup. After successful defenses against Player Uno, Dasher Hatfield, Soldier Ant and Frightmare, Donst was forced to vacate the title on August 27, 2010, in time for the eighth annual Young Lions Cup tournament. On October 23 Donst represented BDK in the torneo cibernetico match, where they faced a team composed of Chikara originals. After a strong showing, which saw Donst eliminate STIGMA, Icarus and Jigsaw from the match, he was himself eliminated by Mike Quackenbush, who managed to counter the Inverted Chikara Special into the original Chikara Special to force a submission. The following week Donst made his first tour of Japan with Osaka Pro Wrestling. In early 2011, when Ares, Castagnoli and Tursas decided not to enter the 2011 King of Trios, Donst was placed in charge of leading BDK in the tournament. After weeks of scouting, Donst, voicing his displeasure with the rest of BDK, announced Delirious and Jakob Hammermeier as his partners and, on April 15, led the BDK trio to defeat Da Soul Touchaz (Acid Jaz, Marshe Rockett and Willie Richardson) in the first round of the tournament. The following day, the BDK trio was eliminated from the tournament in the quarterfinal stage by The Colony (Fire Ant, Green Ant and Soldier Ant). For most of 2011, Donst feuded with Hallowicked, which saw the two men captaining opposite teams in the eighth annual torneo cibernetico match on November 12. After eliminating Sugar Dunkerton, Dasher Hatfield and Hallowicked from the match, Donst was pinned by former BDK member, Team Hallowicked's Sara Del Rey for the win. The following day at Chikara's first internet pay-per-view, High Noon, Donst put his hair and Ares the Eye of Tyr on the line against Hallowicked's and UltraMantis Black's masks in a No Disqualification match. At the end of the match, Donst abandoned Ares, leaving him to be pinned by UltraMantis, saving his hair, but costing BDK the Eye of Tyr in the process. Donst's long rivalry with Hallowicked culminated in a Lucha de Apuestas Mask vs. Hair match on June 2 at Chikarasaurus Rex: How to Hatch a Dinosaur. Originally, Donst won the match after choking out Hallowicked, however, the match was restarted, when the referee of the match discovered that Donst had used a shoelace with the choke. After the restart, Hallowicked won the match and afterwards shaved his rival bald.

On September 15, Donst set his sights on the Chikara Grand Championship, attacking reigning champion Eddie Kingston after his successful title defense against Tadasuke. On November 18, Donst represented Team Kingston in the ninth annual torneo cibernetico, where they faced a team captained by Kevin Steen. In the end, Donst won the match, lastly eliminating Kingston. On December 2, Donst unsuccessfully challenged Kingston for the Grand Championship in the main event of Chikara's third internet pay-per-view, Under the Hood. Following the loss, Donst adopted a new depressed persona, forming a stable known as The Nest of Donst with his storyline followers Jakob Hammermeier, Steve "The Turtle" Weiner and Veronica in early 2013. Also in early 2013, Donst started a rivalry with ring announcer and commentator Gavin Loudspeaker, which culminated in a Hair vs. Hair match at Aniversario: Never Compromise, where Donst lost, after Hammermeier turned on him, and was again forced to have his head shaved. When Chikara returned from its one-year hiatus in May 2014, Donst was no longer part of the promotion's roster.

=== Dragon Gate USA (2014) ===
On February 22, 2014, Donst made his debut for Dragon Gate USA, defeating Chris Dickinson in a singles match. The next day, Donst was defeated by Caleb Konley at Way of the Ronin 2014.

=== Combat Zone Wrestling (2015–2019) ===
On July 11, 2015, Donst made his debut for Combat Zone Wrestling (CZW), defeating Joe Gacy for the CZW Wired Championship. On October 10, 2015, at Tangled Web 8, he lost the title to Joey Janela following outside interference from Gacy. On June 11, 2016, he competed in the Annual CZW Tournament of Death, where he was defeated by Ricky Shane Page in the opening match in the bed of a pickup truck.

== Personal life ==
In February 2015, Hopes announced that his professional wrestling career was possibly over after being diagnosed with a kidney tumor. It was, however, later announced that Donst would be able to continue his career, returning to the ring on July 10.

In May 2015, Hopes submitted a video for WWE Tough Enough. He was, however, not chosen as part of the final 40 contenders for the program.

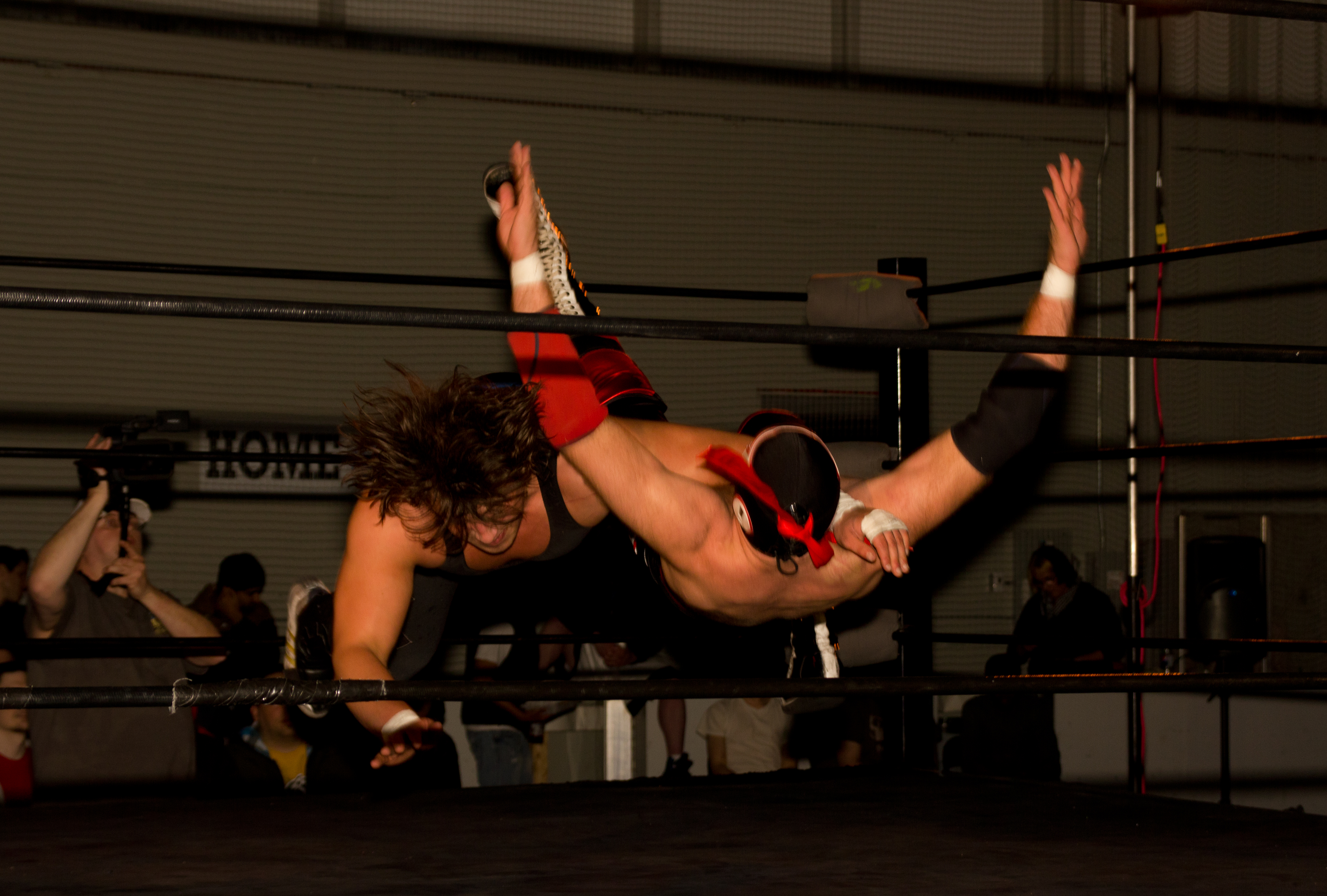
Donst performing an STO on El Generico.

== Championships and accomplishments ==
- Pure Xtremely Brutal Wrestling Entertainment
  - PXBWE Tag Team Championship (1 time) – with Jonathan Gresham
- Absolute Intense Wrestling
  - AIW Intense Championship (1 time)
  - AIW Absolute Championship (3 times)
  - Gauntlet for the Gold (2011, 2014)
- Chikara
  - Young Lions Cup (1 time)
  - Torneo Cibernetico (2012)
- Combat Zone Wrestling
  - CZW Wired Championship (1 time)
- Eastern Pennsylvania Wrestling Entertainment Underground
  - EPWE Underground United States Championship (1 time)
- Epic Pro Wrestling War
  - Epic War Championship (1 time)
  - Epic War Tag Team Championship (1 time) — with Jaysin Strife
- Heartland Wrestling Association
  - HWA Cruiserweight Championship (1 time)
- Pro Wrestling Illustrated
  - PWI ranked him #248 of the top 500 singles wrestlers in the PWI 500 in 2011
- Vicious Outcast Wrestling
  - VOW Hypersonic Championship (1 time)

=== Luchas de Apuestas ===
Winner (wager)	Loser (wager)	Location	Event	Date	Notes
Hallowicked (mask)	Tim Donst (hair)	Philadelphia, Pennsylvania	Chicarasurus Rex	June 2, 2012	
Gavin Loudspeaker (hair)	Tim Donst (hair)	Philadelphia, Pennsylvania	Chikara Anniversario 2013	June 2, 2013	
