= Claudio Castagnoli =

Swiss professional wrestler

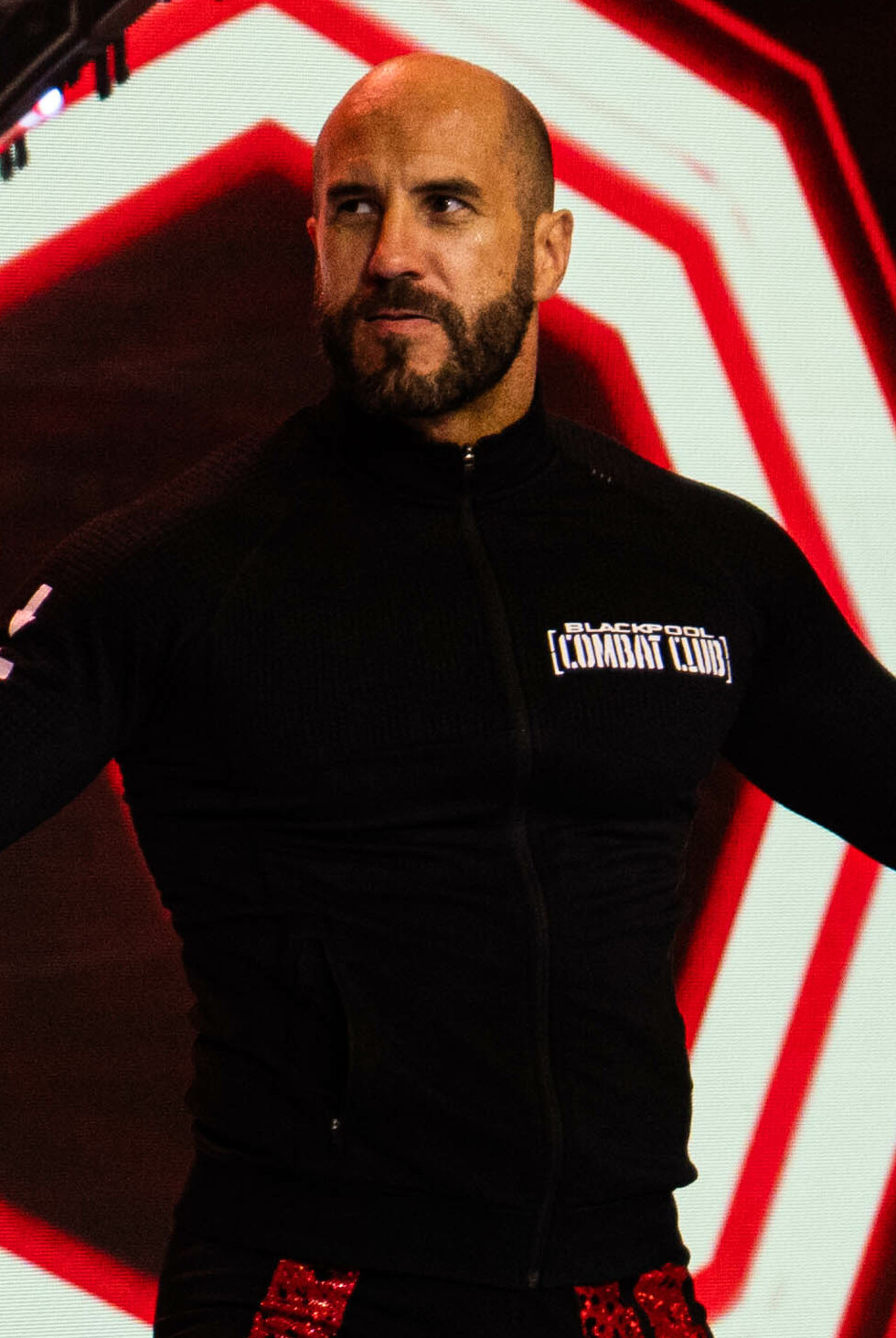
- Castagnoli in 2022

Personal information
- Born: Claudio Castagnoli; 27 December 1980 (age 45) Lucerne, Switzerland
- Life partners: Sara Del Rey (2011–present)

Professional wrestling career
- Ring name(s): Antonio Cesaro; Castaglerious; Cesaro; Claudio Castagnoli; Double C Tenshi Takami; Very Mysterious Ice Cream
- Billed height: 6 ft 5 in (196 cm)
- Billed weight: 232 lb (105 kg)
- Billed from: Lucerne, Switzerland
- Trained by: Chris Hero; Dave Taylor; Mike Quackenbush; SigMasta Rappo; Skayde
- Debut: 24 December 2000

Twitch information
- Channel: ClaudiosCafe
- Years active: 2019–present
- Genre: Gaming
- Followers: 51.7K
- Last updated: 16 March 2024

Claudio Castagnoli (/ˈkæstænˌjoʊli/ Italian: [kastaɲˈɲɔli]; born 27 December 1980) is a Swiss professional wrestler. He is signed to both American promotion All Elite Wrestling (AEW) and Mexican promotion Consejo Mundial de Lucha Libre (CMLL), where he performs under his real name. In AEW, he is a member of the Death Riders stable.

Castagnoli began his career in the European independent wrestling circuit in 2000, and wrestled for numerous independent promotions around the world, including Ring of Honor (ROH), Pro Wrestling Guerrilla (PWG), Combat Zone Wrestling (CZW), Pro Wrestling Noah (NOAH), and Westside Xtreme Wrestling (WxW). During his time on the independent circuit, Castagnoli won numerous championships, and became an accomplished tag team wrestler, most notably forming a team with Chris Hero known as the Kings of Wrestling. The Kings of Wrestling became two-time ROH World Tag Team Champions, with their 364-day reign as champions becoming the longest in ROH history up to that point. The team also held various independent tag team titles, such as the Chikara Campeonatos de Parejas, the JCW Tag Team Championship, and the CZW World Tag Team Championship, with Castagnoli also winning the PWG World Championship once. The Kings of Wrestling were voted as Tag Team of the Year by readers of the Wrestling Observer Newsletter in 2010.

Castagnoli was signed to WWE in 2011, and given the ring name of Antonio Cesaro. He was assigned to WWE's developmental territory, Florida Championship Wrestling (FCW), before making his debut for WWE's main roster in April 2012. Cesaro would hold the WWE United States Championship once, won the inaugural André the Giant Memorial Trophy at WrestleMania XXX, and shortened his name to simply Cesaro. In December 2014, he began a team with Tyson Kidd, with the pair later winning the WWE Tag Team Championship. After that team split, Cesaro would later form an alliance with Sheamus known as The Bar; The Bar won the WWE Raw Tag Team Championship four times, and the WWE SmackDown Tag Team Championship once. The Bar split up in April 2019, and Cesaro joined Sami Zayn and Shinsuke Nakamura to create a stable known as The Artist Collective. Cesaro and Nakamura won the WWE SmackDown Tag Team Championship once in July 2020, making Cesaro a seven-time WWE tag team champion in total. He left WWE in February 2022, and made his debut for AEW in June of that year, returning to his Claudio Castagnoli name and persona, becoming a one-time AEW World Trios Champion. He also returned to ROH and became a two-time ROH World Champion. In March 2026, he signed with CMLL on a dual deal with AEW, and would go on to become a one-time CMLL World Heavyweight Champion.

When playing a villainous character, particularly in the United States, Castagnoli has been known to emphasize his European origin as part of his gimmick, proclaiming a superior intellect and fashion sensibility while regularly using moves such as the European uppercut. He gained a reputation for impressive in-ring feats of strength, and was called one of WWE's best and most underrated performers for much of his time there. He was voted "Most Underrated Wrestler" for a record four years in a row (2013–2016), by the Wrestling Observer Newsletter.

== Early life ==
Claudio Castagnoli was born in Lucerne on 27 December 1980. He played basketball, football, and tennis in his youth, and supported his hometown football club FC Luzern. He became a fan of professional wrestling after discovering it on a German TV station, then found an advertisement on an online forum that encouraged him to train to become a wrestler.

== Professional wrestling career ==
=== Early career (2000–2004) ===
Castagnoli received his initial training in his homeland from fellow Swiss wrestler SigMasta Rappo, and made his debut on Christmas Eve 2000 in Essen for the Germany-based Westside Xtreme Wrestling under the name Double C, losing to SigMasta Rippo. He first used a Japanese gimmick before changing it to a Swiss banker, along with Ares, together known as Swiss Money Holding. While performing in England, Castagnoli received training from Dave Taylor. In Switzerland, he met Chris Hero and Mike Quackenbush, who invited Swiss Money Holding to perform in the United States. They competed in IWA Mid-South and Chikara and received training from Hero before returning to Europe. In 2004, Castagnoli received permanent United States residency in his first try at the green card lottery and moved to the United States, where he began making regular appearances for Ring of Honor and Chikara, while Ares remained in Switzerland and formed the new Swiss Money Holding with Marc Roudin.

=== Chikara (2003–2011) ===
==== Kings of Wrestling (2003–2006) ====
Castagnoli and Ares made their Chikara debuts on 5 July 2003, at the 2003 Tag World Grand Prix, from which they were eliminated after drawing with the SuperFriends (Chris Hero and Mike Quackenbush). Castagnoli returned to Chikara in 2004 as a member of Larry Sweeney's Sweet 'n' Sour International faction. The following year Castagnoli teamed up with Arik Cannon to form AC/CC. The team entered the 2005 Tag World Grand Prix and ended up winning the tournament after Hero turned on his partner Quackenbush in the final of the tournament. Together, Castagnoli, Cannon, and Hero formed the Kings of Wrestling faction. Cannon left the promotion at the end of 2005, leaving Hero and Castagnoli to form a regular tag team. They entered the 2006 Tag World Grand Prix, defeating Equinox and Hydra, Ranmaru and Sumie Sakai, the North Star Express (Ryan Cruz and Darin Corbin), Incoherence (Hallowicked and Delirious), and finally Team Dragondoor (Skayde and Milano Collection A.T.) to become the inaugural Chikara Campeones de Parejas.

On 17 November 2006 at the Chikara show Brick in Reading, Pennsylvania, Castagnoli and Hero lost the Chikara tag titles to Team F.I.S.T. (Icarus and Gran Akuma) in a two out of three falls match. Following the match, Hero and Team F.I.S.T. turned on Castagnoli and attacked him. In November 2006, it was revealed that Castagnoli had signed a developmental deal with the World Wrestling Entertainment, having impressed them with an appearance on Raw (as a police officer in a backstage segment) and a successful tryout for Deep South Wrestling. Shortly after, Castagnoli was released from his WWE contract.

==== Singles competition (2007–2009) ====
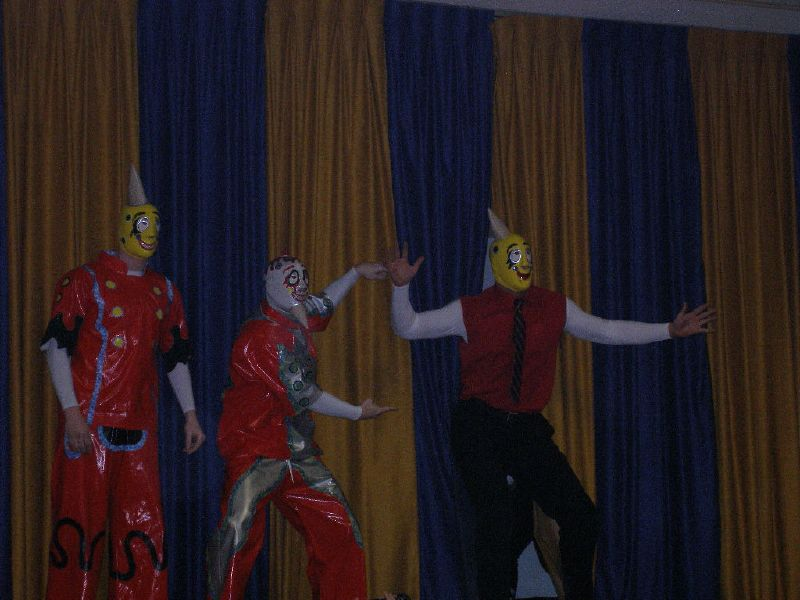
Castagnoli (right), upon his return to Chikara with Ice Cream Jr. (left) and El Hijo del Ice Cream

Castagnoli returned to Chikara on 16 February 2007 as a masked character named "A Very Mysterious Ice Cream", part of Los Ice Creams. Afterward Castagnoli started feuding with his former partner Chris Hero. On 22 April 2007, at Rey de Voladores Hero defeated Castagnoli and as per stipulation of the match Castagnoli was forced to re-join the Kings of Wrestling. The following month Hero, Castagnoli and Larry Sweeney joined forces with Team F.I.S.T. (Icarus, Akuma and Chuck Taylor) to form the Kings of Wrestling superstable, which was later joined by Mitch Ryder, Max Boyer and Shayne Hawke. On 22 September 2007, at Cibernetico & Robin the Kings of Wrestling faced Los Luchadores in the annual torneo cibernetico match. The Kings won the match with Hero, Castagnoli and Mitch Ryder as the survivors, but since the match could only have one winner, they were forced to face each other. Castagnoli forced Hero to tap out and then pinned Ryder to win not only the match, but also his freedom from the Kings of Wrestling. On 9 December 2007, Castagnoli defeated Hero to finally end their long feud. After the match, Hero left the company and Castagnoli took over his training duties at the Chikara Wrestle Factory.

In 2008, Castagnoli started a new feud, this time with Brodie Lee. On 7 September Castagnoli defeated Lee in the first steel cage match in Chikara history to win the feud. On 19 October 2008, Castagnoli won a seven-on-seven Global Gauntlet match where Chikara wrestlers faced off with wrestlers from Big Japan Pro Wrestling.

==== Bruderschaft des Kreuzes (2009–2011) ====
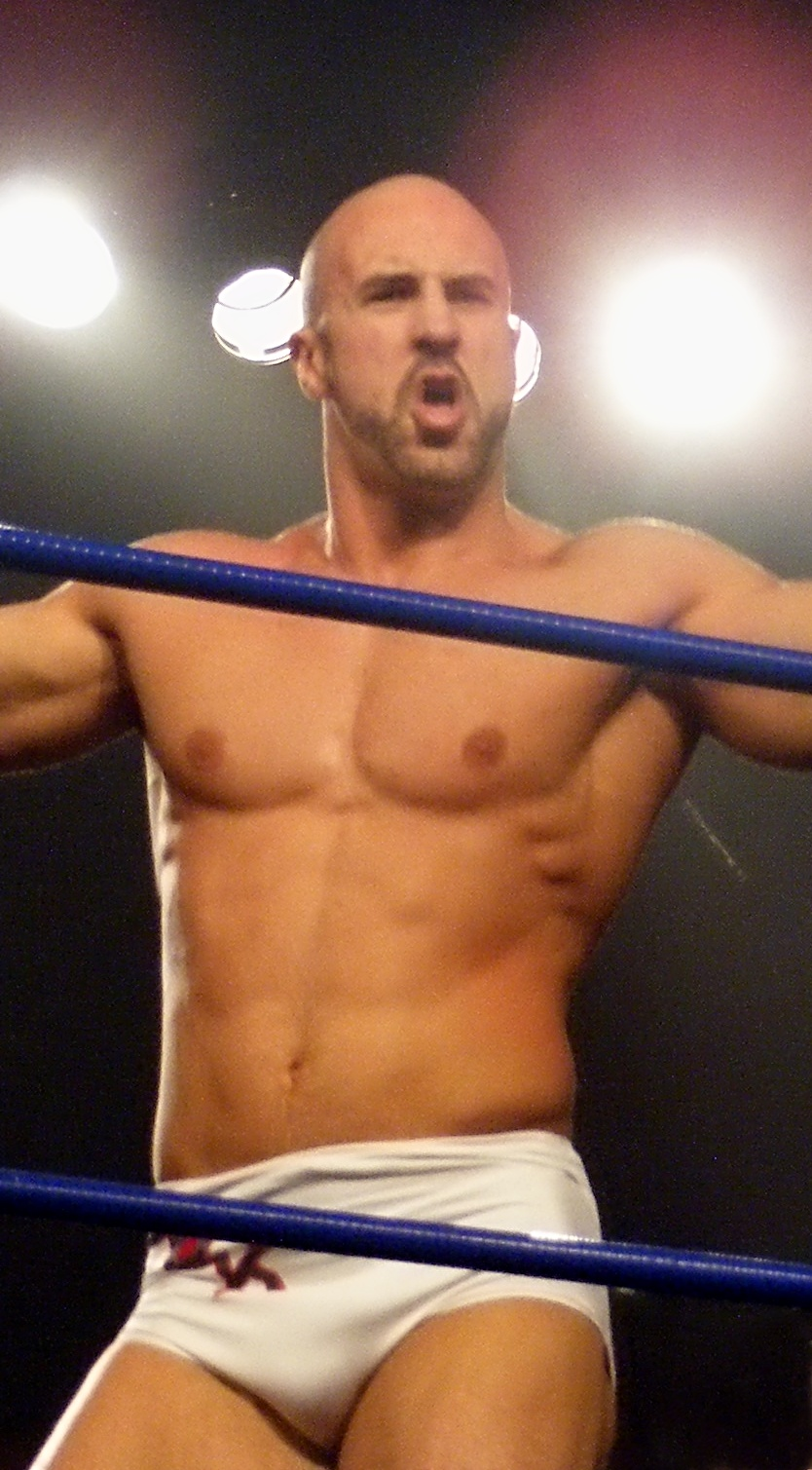
Castagnoli at a Chikara event in 2010

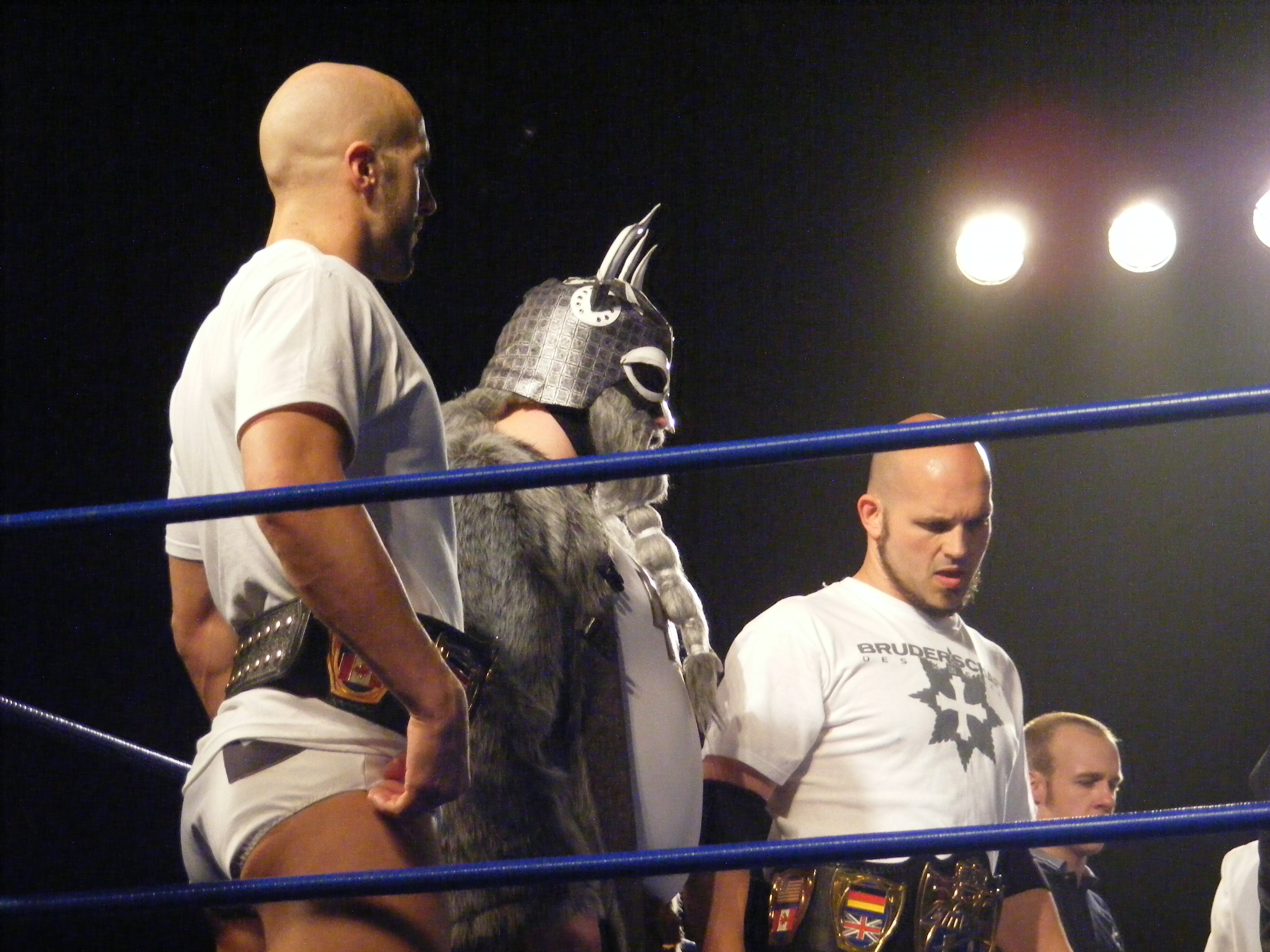
The Bruderschaft des Kreuzes (Castagnoli, Tursas and Ares) as Campeonatos de Parejas

Castagnoli entered the 2009 King of Trios teaming with Bryan Danielson and Dave Taylor as Team Uppercut. The team advanced to the finals of the tournament, where they were defeated by F.I.S.T. (Icarus, Akuma and Taylor). After the tournament Eddie Kingston, whose team The Roughnecks had been eliminated by Castagnoli and his team, claimed that he had been embarrassed and disrespected by Castagnoli. On 24 May 2009, Kingston, who had claimed technical superiority over Castagnoli, pinned him cleanly with an Oklahoma roll. After Castagnoli defeated Kingston via countout at the 2009 Young Lions Cup, the two of them were booked in a "Respect Match" on 22 November 2009, at the season eight finale Three-Fisted Tales, where the loser of the match had to show respect to the winner. Castagnoli won the match, but instead of showing respect, Kingston attacked him, claiming that both Castagnoli and his former partner (Chris Hero) were shady and did not deserve respect. At the conclusion of the show Ares revealed himself as the man who had been stalking UltraMantis Black, at which point Castagnoli turned rudo by attacking Mike Quackenbush. After beating the entire tecnico roster Castagnoli aligned himself with Ares, Tursas, Pinkie Sanchez, Tim Donst, Sara Del Rey, and Daizee Haze to form the Bruderschaft des Kreuzes.

After picking up the three points needed in order to challenge for the Campeonatos de Parejas in just one weekend, Castagnoli and Ares defeated The Colony (Fire Ant and Soldier Ant) on 20 March 2010, to win the championship, making Castagnoli the first two-time Campeon de Parejas in Chikara history. In April Castagnoli, Ares and Tursas defeated the teams of The Osirian Portal (Amasis and Ophidian) and Sara Del Rey, Team Perros del Mal (El Alebrije, Cuije and El Orientál), Team Big Japan Wrestling (Daisuke Sekimoto, Kankuro Hoshino and Yuji Okabayashi) and The Colony (Fire Ant, Soldier Ant and Green Ant) over a three-day tournament to win the 2010 King of Trios. On 23 October Castagnoli represented BDK in the torneo cibernetico match, where they faced a team composed of Chikara originals. He eliminated himself from the match by low blowing Eddie Kingston, but his plan did not work out as Kingston came back to eliminate Tursas and win the match. At the season nine finale on 12 December, Castagnoli and Ares lost the Campeonatos de Parejas to Jigsaw and Mike Quackenbush. On 13 March 2011, Castagnoli and Eddie Kingston finally faced each other in a grudge match fifteen months in the making, with Castagnoli emerging victorious after hitting Kingston with a chain. In May, Castagnoli entered the 12 Large: Summit to determine the first ever Chikara Grand Champion. During the Chikarasaurus Rex weekend on 30 and 31 July, Castagnoli was involved in two main event matches, both of which were also a part of the 12 Large: Summit. After losing to Mike Quackenbush on Night 1, Castagnoli suffered an upset loss against his BDK stablemate Sara Del Rey on Night 2, after which he turned on not only Del Rey, but also Daizee Haze as she was standing up for her regular tag team partner. At the following event on 27 August, Castagnoli was defeated by Icarus, eliminating him from contention in the 12 Large: Summit.

=== Combat Zone Wrestling (2004–2006) ===
In late 2004, Castagnoli made his way to Combat Zone Wrestling, where he teamed up with Chris Hero to once again form the Kings of Wrestling. Eventually, on 10 September 2005 they defeated The Tough Crazy Bastards of Necro Butcher and Toby Klein to win the CZW World Tag Team Championship. While feuding with BLKOUT, Castagnoli and Hero lost the titles to Eddie Kingston and Joker. In September the Tag Team Championship was vacated when Joker left the company and on 14 October 2006, at Last Team Standing Castagnoli and Hero defeated Human Tornado and Justice Pain in the finals of a tournament to regain the championship. With their victory, Castagnoli and Hero held the tag team titles of three of the top American independent companies simultaneously (CZW, Chikara, and ROH).

After news broke that WWE was interested in Castagnoli, he and Hero dropped the CZW World Tag Team Titles to the BLKOUT of Sabian and Robbie Mireno on 11 November 2006. Castagnoli has not returned to the company since the loss.

=== Ring of Honor (2005–2011) ===
==== Feud with Nigel McGuinness; CZW Invasion (2005–2006) ====
Castagnoli made his Ring of Honor debut on 16 July 2005, at Fate of an Angel. For the rest of the year, he feuded with Pure Champion Nigel McGuinness. On 17 December at Final Battle 2005 McGuinness defeated Castagnoli in a match for the title and as a result Claudio could no longer challenge for the title as long as McGuinness was the champion. At the beginning of 2006 Castagnoli's partner from other promotions, Chris Hero, along with other Combat Zone Wrestling wrestlers invaded ROH and started a cross-promotional war. Castagnoli initially sided with ROH, but on 22 April 2006, at The 100th Show turned on the company and assisted Hero, Super Dragon and Necro Butcher in defeating Team ROH (Samoa Joe, B. J. Whitmer and Adam Pearce) in a six-man main event match. On 15 July 2006, at Death Before Dishonor 4 Team ROH defeated Castagnoli, Hero, Necro Butcher, Nate Webb and Eddie Kingston in a Cage of Death match to end the feud. Due to having a contract with ROH prior to the invasion however, Castagnoli was allowed to stay in the company, while the rest of Team CZW were forced out. Hero returned to the company during the August tour of United Kingdom and on 16 September he revealed that he had stolen the ROH World Tag Team Championship belts from champions Austin Aries and Roderick Strong in order to get himself and Castagnoli a match for them. That match took place on 16 September 2006, at Glory By Honor V Night 2, where the Kings of Wrestling defeated Aries and Strong to become the new Ring of Honor tag team champions.

With the news of WWE showing interest in Castagnoli, the Kings of Wrestling dropped the ROH World Tag Team Championship to Christopher Daniels and Matt Sydal on 25 November 2006, at Dethroned. On 23 December at Final Battle 2006 the Briscoe Brothers (Jay and Mark) defeated Castagnoli and Hero in what was scheduled to be their last match together. After the match, Castagnoli announced that he would not be leaving for WWE after all, and promised great things for the Kings of Wrestling in 2007. Hero shook Castagnoli's hand, but left with his manager Larry Sweeney who promised Hero big things in 2007, thus ending the Kings of Wrestling.

==== Pursuit of the ROH World Championship (2007–2009) ====
Castagnoli wrestled on Ring of Honor's first pay-per-view Respect is Earned on 12 May 2007, teaming with Matt Sydal to challenge the Briscoe Brothers for the ROH World Tag Team Championship. Despite losing the match, Castagnoli was granted a rematch with the partner of his choosing. He chose former partner Chris Hero, but the duo lost to the Briscoes on 9 June.

Castagnoli gained success in ROH singles competition on 28 July 2007, by winning Ring of Honor's Race to the Top Tournament, a 16-man, two-night event. He defeated Hallowicked, Mike Quackenbush and Jack Evans en route to the final, where he defeated El Generico. He faced Takeshi Morishima for the ROH World Championship at Death Before Dishonor V: Night One on 10 August, but lost. He received a second shot, this time a three-way match with Brent Albright, later that month, but was again unable to win the title. On 29 December 2007, one year after Hero had abandoned Castagnoli, the two of them faced each other at the second ROH pay-per-view Rising Above. If Castagnoli won the match, he would get five minutes with Larry Sweeney, but if he lost, would have had to join Sweet 'n' Sour Inc. He won, but was defeated by Sweeney the following night at Final Battle 2007, when Sweet & Sour, Inc. member Daniel Puder interfered.

On 28 June 2008, Castagnoli scored one of his biggest victories in Ring of Honor by pinning Bryan Danielson in their first meeting in ROH. The following month, on 26 July, Castagnoli received a match for the ROH World Championship against Nigel McGuinness, but lost. On 2 August, Castagnoli failed a Championship rematch against McGuinness. Along with Bryan Danielson and ROH World Tag Team Champion Tyler Black, he competed in a four-man elimination match. He wound up being the first eliminated by Danielson and afterwards snapped and beat Danielson down setting him up to be eliminated by the eventual winner McGuinness. After turning heel Castagnoli started referring to himself as "very European", joined Prince Nana's heel stable The Embassy and feuded with Brent Albright.

==== Kings of Wrestling reunion (2009–2011) ====
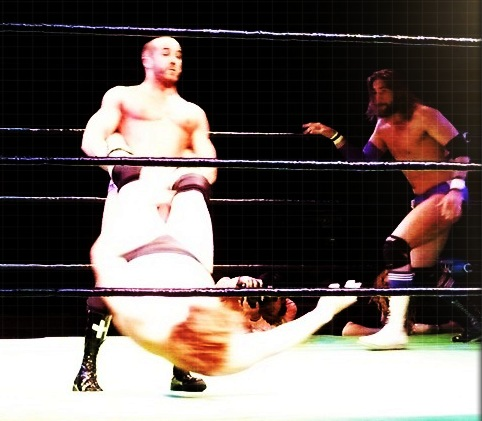
Castagnoli performing the giant swing as Hero waits to dropkick the spinning opponent

On 19 December 2009, at Final Battle 2009, ROH's first live pay-per-view, Castagnoli reunited with his former Kings of Wrestling partner Chris Hero as they attacked the new ROH World Tag Team Champions, the Briscoe Brothers. The two adopted Shane Hagadorn as their manager and Sara Del Rey as an associate. On 3 April 2010, at The Big Bang! Castagnoli and Hero defeated the Briscoes to win the ROH World Tag Team Championship for the second time. At the following pay-per-view, Death Before Dishonor VIII, on 19 June Castagnoli and Hero successfully defended their Championship against the Briscoes in a No Disqualification match. In July, ROH announced the return of Tag Wars, where 12 tag teams competed in three blocks to determine new challengers for the Kings of Wrestling in an Ultimate Endurance match. On 28 August the Kings of Wrestling defeated The Dark City Fight Club (Jon Davis and Kory Chavis), The All Night Express (Kenny King and Rhett Titus) and the Briscoes to retain their championship and win the 2010 Tag Wars. On 2 September it was announced that Castagnoli had signed a contract with ROH, which gave the company priority in his independent bookings.

At the following pay–per–view, Glory By Honor IX on 11 September, the Kings of Wrestling picked up a major victory by defeating Wrestling's Greatest Tag Team (Charlie Haas and Shelton Benjamin) in a non–title match. On 18 December at Final Battle 2010 the Kings of Wrestling ended their feud with the Briscoe Brothers in a six-man tag team match, where Jay, Mark and their father Mike defeated Castagnoli, Hero and Shane Hagadorn. On 4 January 2011 Castagnoli and Hero became the longest reigning ROH World Tag Team Champions by breaking the previous record of 275 days, set by the Briscoe Brothers. On 26 February at the 9th Anniversary Show, Castagnoli and Hero successfully defended the ROH World Tag Team Championship against The All Night Express. On 1 April at Honor Takes Center Stage, the Kings of Wrestling lost the ROH World Tag Team Championship to Haas and Benjamin, ending their reign at 363 days. Castagnoli and Hero received their rematch for the ROH World Tag Team Championship on 13 August at the first Ring of Honor Wrestling tapings under the Sinclair Broadcast Group banner, but were unable to regain the championship from Haas and Benjamin.

=== Pro Wrestling Guerrilla (2005–2008, 2010–2011) ===
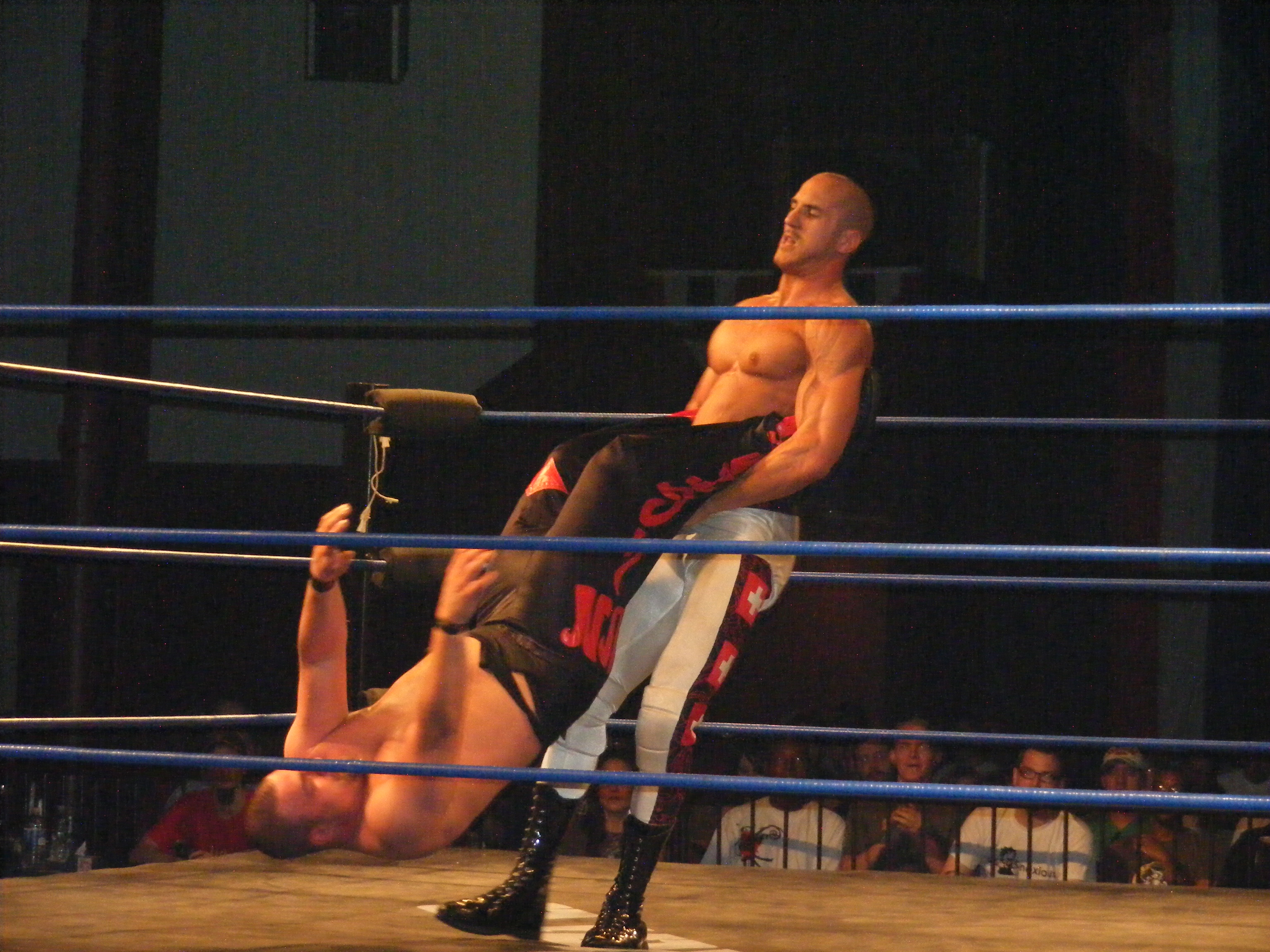
Castagnoli performing the giant swing in 2009

On 6 August 2005, Castagnoli made his debut for Pro Wrestling Guerrilla, losing to Joey Ryan. On 2 September 2006, Castagnoli entered his first Battle of Los Angeles tournament, but ended up being eliminated in the first round by Jack Evans. On 21 October, at Horror Business Castagnoli and Hero attempted to win the PWG World Tag Team Championship to hold four different sets of Tag Team titles simultaneously, but were unable to dethrone the Champions Super Dragon and Davey Richards. They received another match for the Championship during the 2007 DDT4 tournament, but were defeated in the first round by the Briscoes. In August 2007, Castagnoli competed in his second Battle of Los Angeles. He defeated Doug Williams in the first round, but lost to Pac in the second.

In late 2007, Chris Hero was involved in a feud with Human Tornado and when Hero's scheduled tag team partner Eddie Kingston turned on him in a mystery tag team partner match and sided with Tornado instead, Castagnoli came out and took Kingston's place as Hero's partner. However, when Hero went to tag Castagnoli, he nailed him with a European uppercut, turned heel and joined Tornado and Kingston. On 5 January 2008, at All Star Weekend 6: Night One Tornado, Castagnoli and Kingston defeated Hero, Necro Butcher and Hero's girlfriend/valet Candice LeRae in a six-person tag team match to earn Tornado a match with LeRae. On 21 March 2008, Hero defeated Castagnoli in a grudge match. On 6 July 2008, at PWG's fifth anniversary show Life During Wartime Castagnoli wrestled his last match at the time for the promotion, defeating Phoenix Star.

Castagnoli returned to the company for the annual Battle of Los Angeles Tournament on 4 September 2010. Castagnoli made it to the semifinals of the tournament, defeating Ricochet and Roderick Strong, before losing to the eventual winner Joey Ryan. Ryan should then have earned a match for the PWG World Championship, but as Davey Richards was stripped of the championship, Castagnoli and the three other Battle of Los Angeles semifinalists – Brandon Gatson, Chris Hero and Joey Ryan – were placed in a four-way match to determine a new Champion. On 9 October's The Curse of Guerrilla Island, Castagnoli defeated Gatson, Hero and Ryan to win the PWG World Championship, his first major singles title in the United States.

Castagnoli and Hero were scheduled to face PWG World Tag Team Champions, ¡Peligro Abejas! (El Generico and Paul London), in a non–title match at the following event. Due to Castagnoli's title win, the Champions agreed to put their belts on the line as long as Castagnoli agreed to give the victor a shot at the PWG World Championship, should the Kings lose. After Castagnoli had agreed to the stipulation, ¡Peligro Abejas! defeated him and Hero to retain the World Tag Team Championship and earn El Generico a shot at the PWG World Championship. On 29 January 2011, during the WrestleReunion 5 weekend, Castagnoli made his first successful defense by defeating El Generico. On 4 March Castagnoli and Hero entered the 2011 DDT 4 Tournament, defeating the Cutler Brothers (Brandon and Dustin Cutler) in their first-round match. However, in the semifinals of the tournament the Kings of Wrestling suffered an upset loss against the Nightmare Violence Connection (Akira Tozawa and Kevin Steen) when Tozawa rolled Hero up for the win. On 9 April Castagnoli defended the PWG World Championship against the Battle of Los Angeles winner, Joey Ryan, who had knocked him out of the previous year's tournament. On 27 May, during the first night of All Star Weekend 8, Castagnoli successfully defended the PWG World Championship against his longtime tag team partner Chris Hero. The following night, Castagnoli defeated Low Ki to retain the title. On 23 July at PWG's eighth anniversary show, Castagnoli defeated Hero in a rematch for the PWG World Championship. After the match Castagnoli accepted a challenge from Kevin Steen and ended up losing the title to him in the impromptu match, ending his reign at 287 days.

On 20 August, after both Castagnoli and Hero were eliminated from the 2011 Battle of Los Angeles in the first round, they challenged PWG World Tag Team Champions, The Young Bucks (Matt and Nick Jackson), to a match for the title. The match, which took place later that same evening, saw the Kings of Wrestling once again fail to win the PWG World Tag Team Championship.

=== Pro Wrestling Noah (2008–2011) ===
Castagnoli made his debut for Pro Wrestling Noah on 15 February 2008, when he teamed up with Chris Hero in a losing effort against Jun Akiyama and Kentaro Shiga. He primarily wrestled in the promotion as Chris Hero's tag team partner and in January 2010 the Kings of Wrestling entered the Global Tag League, where they ended up losing all of their matches. Castagnoli and Hero returned to Noah on 19 November 2010, for a three-week-long tour. The team went undefeated in tag team matches, before being defeated on the final day of the tour, 5 December, by Takuma Sano and Yoshihiro Takayama in a match for the GHC Tag Team Championship.

The Kings of Wrestling returned to Noah in April 2011 to take part in the 2011 Global Tag League, where they managed to win two out of their seven-round robin matches, finishing seventh out of eight teams in the block. On 15 May, he traveled to Germany to challenge Takashi Sugiura's GHC Heavyweight Championship on "Genesis in Germany", co-promoted by local Westside Xtreme Wrestling and NOAH. However, he was unsuccessful in his challenge, losing after an Olympic Slam.

=== Other promotions (2006–2010) ===
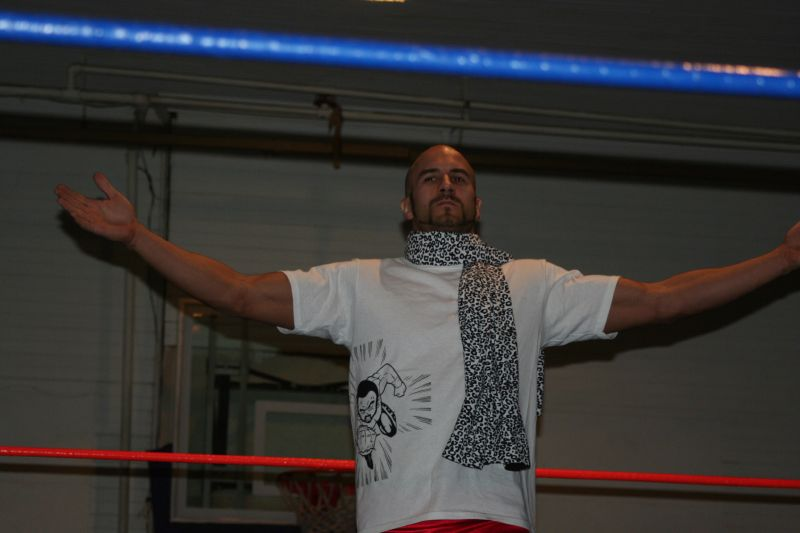
Castagnoli in the ring in 2009

In November 2006, he wrestled Antonio Thomas in one half of the main event at MXW Pro Wrestling's Capital Collision show in Albany, New York. In April 2007, Castagnoli represented Chikara in the inaugural King of Europe Cup, a sixteen-man tournament held in Liverpool, England. He lost in the opening match against CZW's representative and former partner, Chris Hero.

During mid-2007, Castagnoli competed in the Reclaiming the Glory Tournament for the newly vacated NWA World Heavyweight Championship under the Terry Funk bracket. He defeated Pepper Parks in the first-round qualifiers and Sicodelico Jr. in the second before losing to Brent Albright in the semi-finals on 12 August in Charlotte, North Carolina.

Later in September, Castagnoli competed in Independent Wrestling Association Mid-South's Ted Petty Invitational 2007 tournament. He defeated Nigel McGuinness in the first round, Davey Richards in the quarterfinals, and Brent Albright in the semifinals to compete in a three-way elimination match, with finalists Mike Quackenbush and IWA Mid-South Heavyweight Champion Chuck Taylor. He was first eliminated by the eventual winner, Quackenbush, being pinned following a Quackendriver II. Castagnoli replaced Fergal Devitt in the eight-man NWA Australian Championship Tournament which was held in November 2007.

On 13 March 2010, Castagnoli made his debut for Evolve Wrestling, at the promotion's second event, defeating Bobby Fish. At the following show on 1 May Castagnoli was defeated by Chuck Taylor.

=== WWE (2011–2022) ===
==== Florida Championship Wrestling (2011–2012) ====
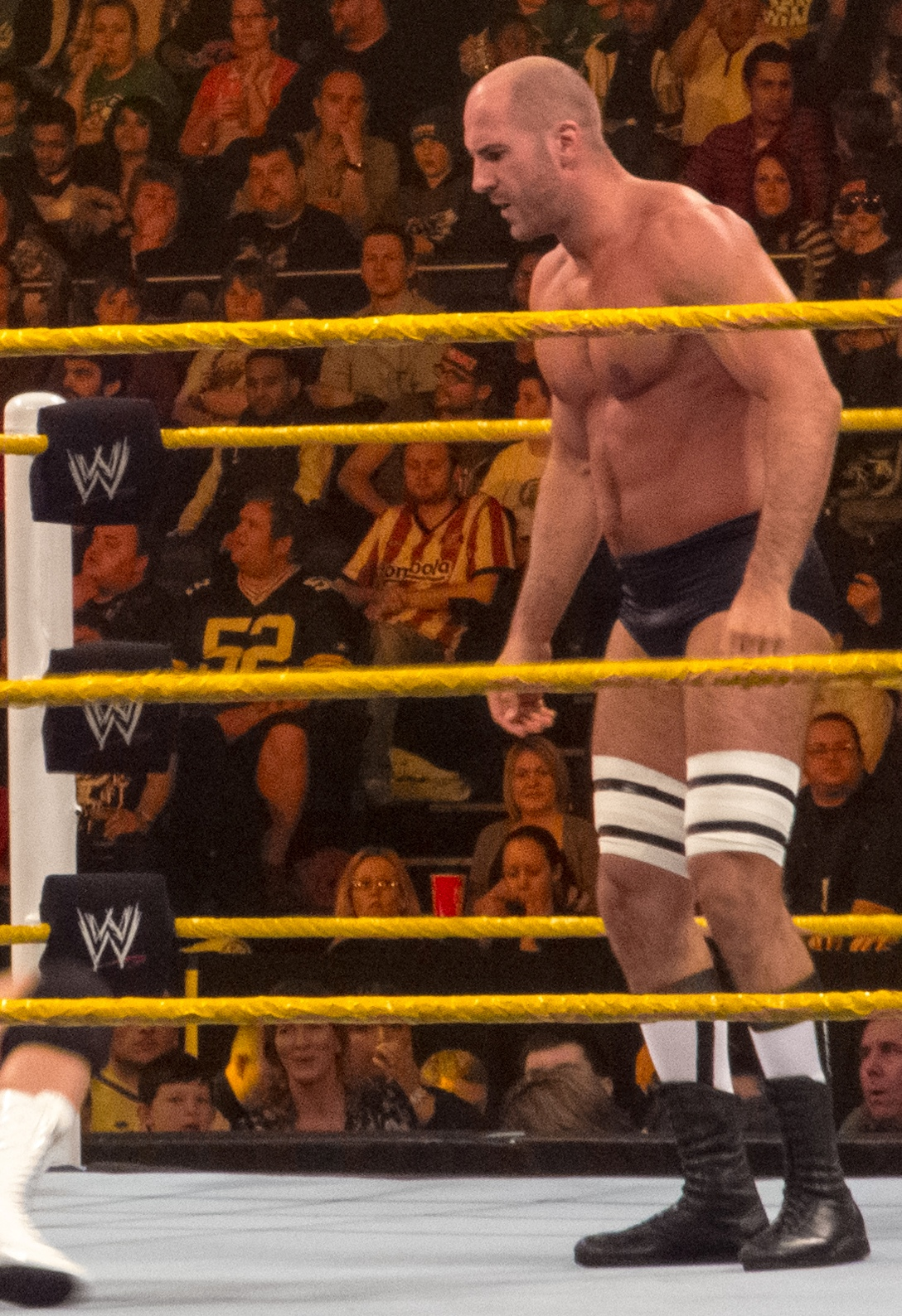
Castagnoli as Antonio Cesaro during a WWE dark match in 2012

In September 2011, Castagnoli signed a contract with WWE and began working in its developmental territory Florida Championship Wrestling (FCW) under the new ring name Antonio Cesaro. He worked on the television program FCW until March 2012.

==== United States Champion (2012–2013) ====
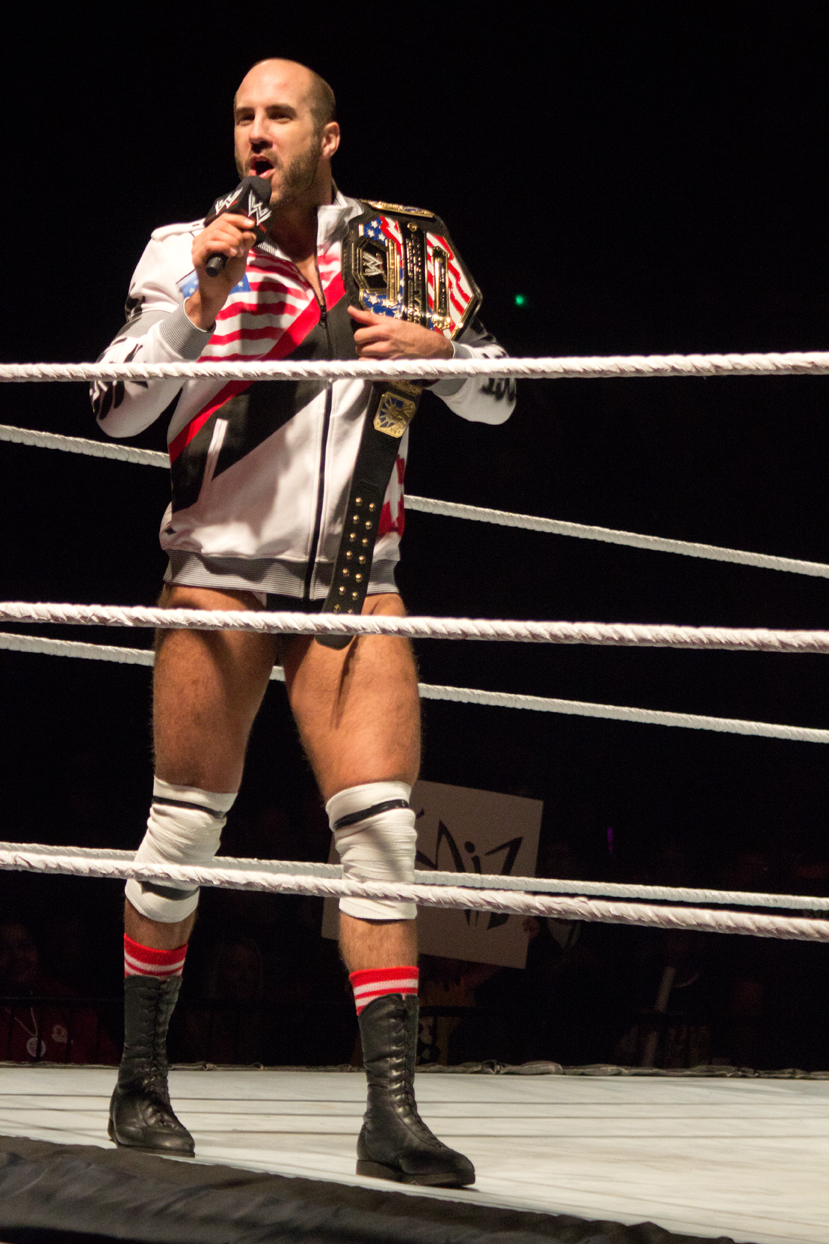
Cesaro as the United States Champion in 2013

Cesaro made his WWE television debut on 20 April episode of SmackDown, appearing in a backstage segment with Aksana. On 3 July live episode of The Great American Bash SmackDown, Cesaro suffered his first loss when he and Aksana were defeated in a mixed tag team match by The Great Khali and Layla. On the SummerSlam pre-show on 19 August, Cesaro defeated Santino Marella to win the WWE United States Championship, his first singles title in WWE. Cesaro retained the title against Zack Ryder on 16 September at Night of Champions. On 21 September SmackDown, Cesaro ended his relationship with Aksana after an inadvertent distraction from her cost him his non-title match with Santino Marella. This led to a title rematch between Cesaro and Marella the following week, where Cesaro was able to retain his title easily.

At Hell in a Cell on 28 October, Cesaro successfully retained the United States Championship against Justin Gabriel. Cesaro then began feuding with R-Truth after Truth saved Kofi Kingston from a post-match assault from Cesaro on 29 October Raw. On 18 November at Survivor Series, Cesaro defeated R-Truth to retain the United States Championship. The feud continued on the following SmackDown, with Truth defeating Cesaro in a non-title match. Cesaro then defeated Truth in two more matches, first in a four-way match, which also included Kofi Kingston and Wade Barrett on 3 December Raw and second on 16 December at TLC: Tables, Ladders & Chairs in a singles match, to retain his title. On 31 December Raw, Cesaro issued a title challenge to Sgt. Slaughter as part of the "Champion's Choice Night" and then defeated Slaughter in the match that followed to retain his championship. At the Royal Rumble pre-show on 27 January 2013, Cesaro defeated The Miz to retain the United States Championship. On 17 February at Elimination Chamber, he retained the United States Championship against Miz via disqualification after Miz accidentally hit him in the groin. Cesaro and Miz faced off in a two-out-of-three falls match for the title on 1 March SmackDown, where Cesaro retained his title to end their feud. On 15 April Raw, Cesaro lost the United States Championship to Kofi Kingston in an upset victory, ending his long-lived reign at 239 days.

==== Real Americans (2013–2014) ====
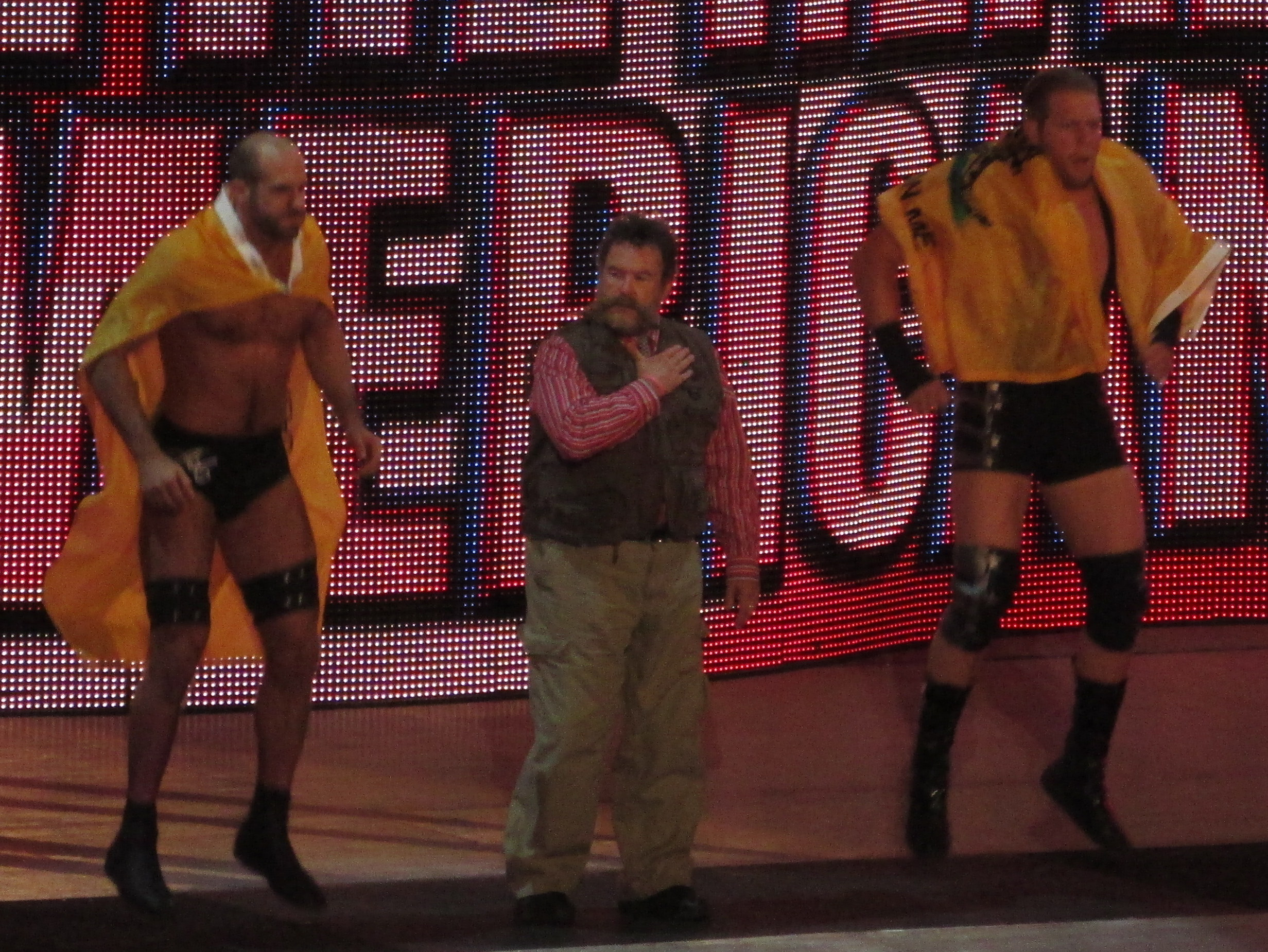
In 2013, Cesaro formed the Real Americans with Zeb Colter and Jack Swagger

In May, Cesaro started a feud with Sami Zayn in NXT, where the two held some of what would later be considered the best matches of 2013. On the 22 May episode of NXT, Zayn scored an upset victory over Cesaro in his debut match. Cesaro later defeated Zayn in a rematch on the 13 June episode of NXT. On the 17 June episode of Raw, Cesaro began to work with Zeb Colter and Jack Swagger as The Real Americans. On the 21 August episode of NXT, Cesaro defeated Zayn in a two-out-of-three falls match to conclude the feud.

On 15 September at the Night of Champions pre-show, The Real Americans competed in a #1 contenders Tag Team Turmoil match for the WWE Tag Team Championship, in which they were the last team eliminated by The Prime Time Players (Darren Young and Titus O'Neil). At Hell in a Cell on 27 October, they lost to Los Matadores (Diego and Fernando). The following night on Raw, The Real Americans defeated WWE Tag Team Champions Cody Rhodes and Goldust in a non-title match. On 18 November Raw, a fan handed out a hundred simple black and white signs on standard printer paper with the words "Cesaro Section" printed on them. A group of fans held them up together in Cesaro's match and this made it to air and was remarked on by the commentators, as well as by Cesaro himself after the show; this was picked up by other fans, and the Cesaro Section phenomenon quickly spread from there to other arenas and events."

Cesaro competed in the 30-man Royal Rumble match at Royal Rumble on 26 January, entering at #21 but was eliminated by Roman Reigns. On the 31 January episode of SmackDown, Cesaro defeated Dolph Ziggler to earn a spot at the Elimination Chamber match for the WWE World Heavyweight Championship. On 14 February SmackDown, while his ring name was shortened to Cesaro, he defeated WWE World Heavyweight Champion Randy Orton clean in a non-title match. At Elimination Chamber on 23 February, Cesaro was eliminated by Cena via submission. On 27 February at NXT Arrival, Cesaro defeated Zayn again, but embraced Zayn after the match.

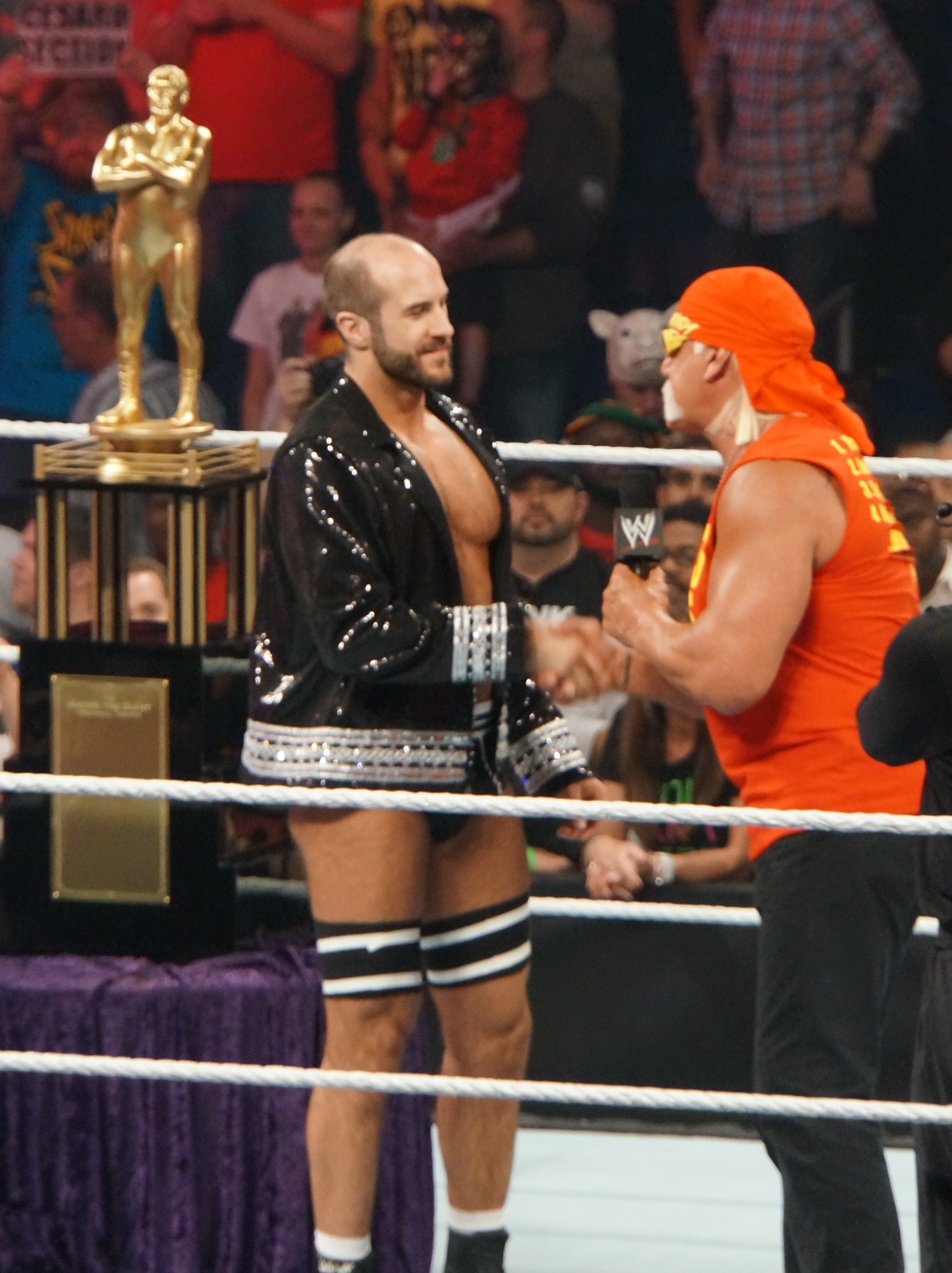
On the post-WrestleMania Raw, Hulk Hogan endorsed and congratulated Cesaro for winning the André the Giant Memorial Battle Royal at WrestleMania XXX

During the WrestleMania XXX pre-show on 6 April, The Real Americans were the final team eliminated during a fatal four-way tag team elimination match for the WWE Tag Team Championship. Jack Swagger blamed Cesaro for the loss and put Cesaro in the Patriot Lock before Colter demanded that the duo to shake hands. Cesaro instead retaliated with a Cesaro Swing on Swagger. Later during the pay-per-view Cesaro was a surprise entrant in the inaugural André the Giant Memorial Battle Royal, which he won by making the final elimination of the Big Show, body slamming him over the top rope and out of the ring in a manner reminiscent of Hulk Hogan's body slam of André at WrestleMania III. In a 2015 interview, Cesaro would describe this victory as his "career highlight" to that point.

==== Teaming with Tyson Kidd (2014–2015) ====
On the post-WrestleMania Raw on 7 April, Hogan endorsed Cesaro's WrestleMania victory. Cesaro proceeded to dump Colter as his manager, instead revealing that he was a Paul Heyman guy. After Cesaro was eliminated by Rob Van Dam from a tournament for an Intercontinental Championship title shot, he defeated Van Dam and Swagger in an elimination match at Extreme Rules on 4 May. At Payback on 1 June, Cesaro faced Sheamus for the United States Championship in a losing effort. At Money in the Bank on 29 June, he competed in a ladder match for the vacant WWE World Heavyweight Championship, which was won by John Cena. On 21 July Raw, Cesaro ended his partnership with Paul Heyman. In July 2014, WWE.com noted that one of Cesaro's signature moves, the Cesaro Swing, was "now a rarely used attraction" after previously being "a daily maneuver"; also that month, it was reported that WWE officials had told Cesaro to stop using the Cesaro Swing because it was making him too popular, and they did not want him being cheered as a heel.

Cesaro "was on the verge of big things with fans getting behind what they expected would be a babyface turn... Then it fell apart. They did a heel turn to put him with Paul Heyman, and apparently figured that enabled them to not give him wins at all since Heyman was with him... but he'd stay over [... this was] before his big babyface turn fell completely apart and the turn was forgotten about".

— Dave Meltzer on Cesaro winning the 2014 Wrestling Observer Newsletter award for Most Underrated.

Cesaro lost to Rob Van Dam at the SummerSlam pre-show on 17 August. By defeating Van Dam in a rematch on Raw, Cesaro earned a United States title match against Sheamus, but lost again at Night of Champions on 21 September. Instead, Cesaro switched his sights to another title, the Intercontinental Championship held by Dolph Ziggler, as Cesaro became #1 contender after winning a battle royal. From September to November, Cesaro faced Ziggler in a title match on five occasions, on Raw, SmackDown and on 26 October at Hell in a Cell, but lost every match, including three-way matches and a two-out-of-three falls match.

In a December 2014 interview, Stone Cold Steve Austin asked Vince McMahon why Cesaro had not gotten over yet and asked whether Cesaro was getting a proper push. McMahon replied that Cesaro was lacking in charisma, verbal skills, and the "it" factor, "might be because he's Swiss ... and the European style". McMahon concluded that he was not certain what could be done to restore Cesaro's momentum, but McMahon was not giving up.

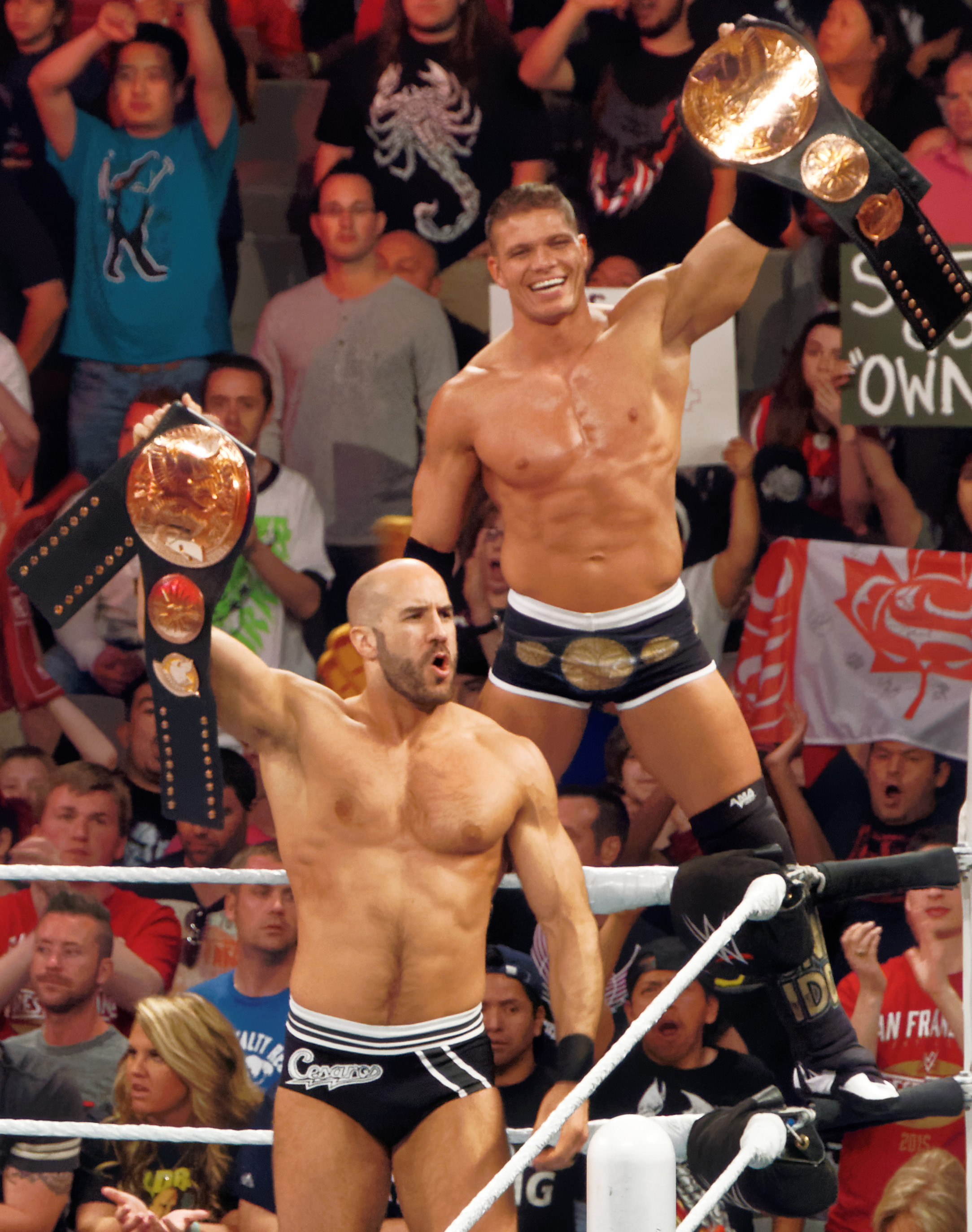
During the first half of 2015, Cesaro spent much of his time teaming with Tyson Kidd in pursuit of the WWE Tag Team Championship

Cesaro began teaming with Tyson Kidd on the 1 December episode of Raw and were eliminated from a gauntlet match for a tag title shot by The Usos. At the Royal Rumble pre-show on 25 January, Cesaro and Kidd defeated The New Day (Big E, Kofi Kingston and Xavier Woods). Later that night, Cesaro entered the Royal Rumble match at #28 but was eliminated by Dolph Ziggler. At Fastlane on 22 February, Cesaro and Kidd defeated The Usos to capture the WWE Tag Team Championship. They retained their titles in a rematch the following night on Raw after their valet Natalya caused a disqualification. Cesaro and Kidd retained their titles at the WrestleMania 31 pre-show on 29 March in a fatal four-way tag team match. Cesaro also competed in the André the Giant memorial battle royal, but was eliminated by Big Show. Cesaro and Kidd reignited their feud against The New Day, where a double turn took place; Cesaro and Kidd turned face by displaying a fighting spirit, marking Cesaro's first ever face turn in WWE, while The New Day turned heel by using underhanded tactics during their matches. At Extreme Rules on 26 April, Cesaro and Kidd lost the titles to The New Day (Big E and Kofi Kingston). They failed to regain the championship at Payback in a 2-out-of-3 falls match on 17 May due to Xavier Woods' interference. At Elimination Chamber on 31 May, they failed to win the titles in the inaugural tag team Elimination Chamber match. On 7 June, it was announced that Kidd had suffered a legitimate spinal injury and would be out of action for over a year.

==== Cesaro Section (2015–2016) ====
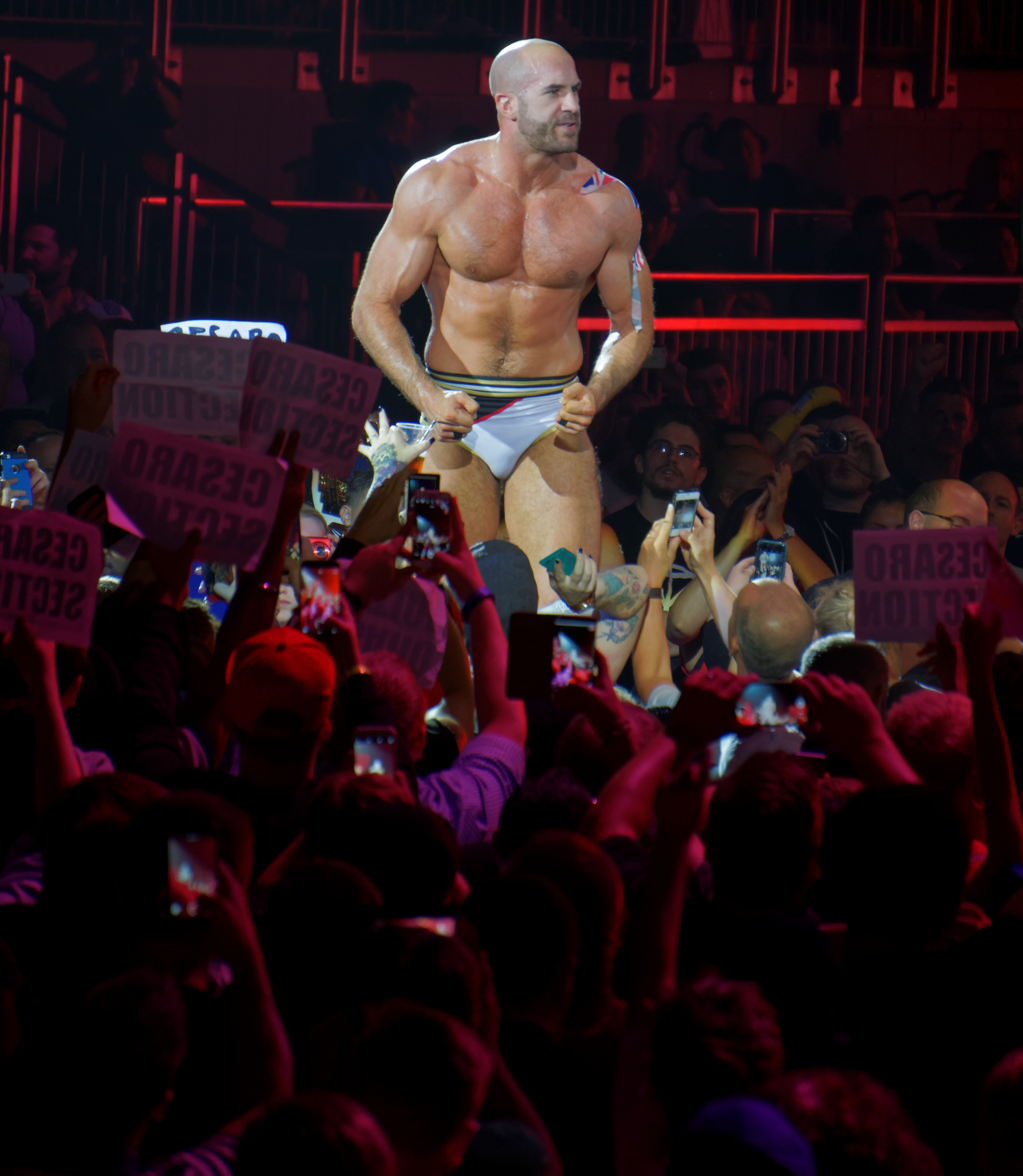
Cesaro with "Cesaro Section" in 2016

"... Cesaro's one main undesirable attribute: being a super talented wrestler whom the fans clearly want to see succeed, but is never given any serious push because of the decision of one man based on vague, shaky reasons."

— Zach Dominello writing for the Wrestling Observer website in 2015.

On the 29 June episode of Raw, Cesaro answered John Cena's United States Championship open challenge and won by disqualification after Kevin Owens interfered and assaulted Cesaro. He unsuccessfully challenged Cena for the title again the next week on Raw. Both matches were critically praised, and the second one was awarded the Slammy Award for "Best John Cena U.S. Open Challenge". On the 13 July episode of Raw, Cesaro confronted Kevin Owens and Rusev about who should face Cena for the championship. This resulted in a triple threat match, where the winner would face Cena immediately after, which Rusev won. On the 16 July episode of SmackDown, Cesaro became only the second man (after John Cena) to pin Rusev in a singles match. At SummerSlam on 23 August, Cesaro lost to Owens. Around this time, with Cesaro now firmly established as a fan favorite, the Cesaro Section phenomenon that originated in early 2014 again found traction, and home-made printed "Cesaro Section" signs again became circulated widely for fans to hold up during events to show their support for Cesaro. Cesaro defeated Sheamus on the 9 November episode of Raw to advance to the quarterfinals in a tournament to crown a new WWE World Heavyweight Champion at Survivor Series after previous champion Seth Rollins injured his knee at a house show in Dublin, but lost to Roman Reigns in the semi-finals on 16 November. On 23 November, WWE announced that Cesaro needed surgery for a torn rotator cuff muscle in his left shoulder that had been injured for at least two months, and that would leave him out of action for four to six months.

Cesaro made his return from injury on the Raw after WrestleMania 32 on the 4 April 2016 episode of Raw, introducing a new James Bond style entrance and attire to his character, including a tear-away business suit. He replaced Sami Zayn as a surprise entrant in the main event, a fatal 4-way match between himself, Kevin Owens, AJ Styles and Chris Jericho to determine the #1 contender for the WWE World Heavyweight Championship, with the match being won by Styles. On 11 April edition of Raw, Cesaro defeated Kevin Owens to become the #1 contender for the Intercontinental Championship held by The Miz. At Payback on 1 May, Cesaro failed to win the title after a distraction by Zayn and Owens, allowing Miz to retain the title. A fatal 4-way match for the title between Cesaro, Miz, Owens, and Zayn was then made for the Extreme Rules pay-per-view on 22 May. The Miz ultimately prevailed by pinning Cesaro after Zayn executed a Helluva Kick on Cesaro. The following night on Raw Cesaro defeated Miz for a spot in the Money in the Bank ladder match. On the following episode of SmackDown, The Miz retained the title against Cesaro. At Money in the Bank on 19 June, Cesaro was unsuccessful as the match was won by Dean Ambrose.

==== The Bar (2016–2019) ====
On 19 July at the 2016 WWE draft, Cesaro was drafted to Raw. Afterwards, while being interviewed live on the WWE Network by JoJo, Cesaro legitimately complained about how he should have been drafted "at least top 10" and thought he would be a better fit on the more wrestling-oriented SmackDown brand, as well as criticizing the decision to have the storyline focus on the potential drama between Stephanie McMahon and Raw General Manager Mick Foley as opposed to the wrestlers themselves. While WWE would eventually continue this as part of an angle, Dave Meltzer confirmed on Twitter that the interview was a shoot and that Cesaro had unexpectedly gone off-script. After the draft, Cesaro would then begin a rivalry with Sheamus, and Mick Foley announced that the pair would face each other in a Best of Seven Series, with the first match taking place on 21 August on the SummerSlam kick-off show, which Sheamus won. Sheamus would defeat Cesaro in the second and third matches, but Cesaro defeated Sheamus in the fourth, fifth and sixth match, tying the series 3–3. The two faced in the seventh and deciding match at Clash of Champions, which ended in a no contest, leaving the result of their series unclear. The next night on Raw, Mick Foley decided to make the two men partners. In spite of the two not getting along, Cesaro and Sheamus received a match for the Raw Tag Team Championship against The New Day (Big E and Xavier Woods) at Hell in a Cell on 30 October, winning the match by disqualification but not the titles since championships cannot change hands by disqualification.

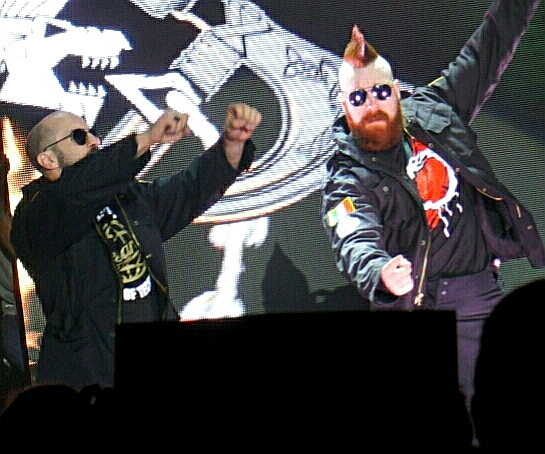
Cesaro (left) and Sheamus in May 2017

At Survivor Series on 20 November, Cesaro and Sheamus made up part of Team Raw as they defeated Team SmackDown in a 10-on-10 Survivor Series elimination tag team match. The next night on Raw, Cesaro and Sheamus again failed to capture Raw Tag Team Championship from The New Day. Following this, Cesaro and Sheamus finally began to co-operate with each other, and the two defeated the New Day on 18 December at Roadblock: End of the Line to win the tag team championship. Going into 2017, Cesaro and Sheamus began a feud with Luke Gallows and Karl Anderson. At the Royal Rumble on 29 January, Cesaro and Sheamus lost the championship to Anderson and Gallows. The pair also competed in the Royal Rumble match later that night, but both were eliminated by Chris Jericho after getting into an argument. At WrestleMania 33 on 2 April, Cesaro and Sheamus competed in a four-team ladder match for the Raw Tag Team Championship, which was won by The Hardy Boyz (Matt Hardy and Jeff Hardy).

At Payback on 30 April, Cesaro and Sheamus unsuccessfully challenged The Hardy Boyz for the championship and after the match, Cesaro turned heel for the first time since 2015, along with Sheamus by attacking The Hardy Boyz after the match. The duo then christened themselves as "The Bar", and again challenged The Hardy Boyz for the championship in a steel cage match at Extreme Rules on 4 June, which The Bar won. They then successfully defended the championship against The Hardy Boyz on Raw, and again on 9 July at Great Balls of Fire. However, at SummerSlam on 20 August, The Bar lost the Raw Tag Team Championship to Dean Ambrose and Seth Rollins. On 24 September at No Mercy, The Bar were again defeated by Ambrose and Rollins in a rematch for the championship, during which Cesaro suffered an injury to his two front teeth. WWE released a statement on Cesaro's medical condition stating that his teeth had been pushed up into his upper jaw by about 3 to 4 mm and that he would next go to see a maxillofacial surgeon.

After this, The Bar teamed up with The Miz, Braun Strowman and Kane against Ambrose, Rollins and Kurt Angle in a five-on-three TLC match at TLC: Tables, Ladders & Chairs on 23 October in a losing effort. On the 6 November episode of Raw, the duo regained their titles from Rollins and Ambrose, winning the title for the third time as a team. At Survivor Series on 19 November, as SmackDown Tag Team Champions they were defeated by The Usos in an inter-brand Champion vs Champion match. The Bar later lost the tag team titles to the team of Seth Rollins and Jason Jordan on the 25 December episode of Raw.

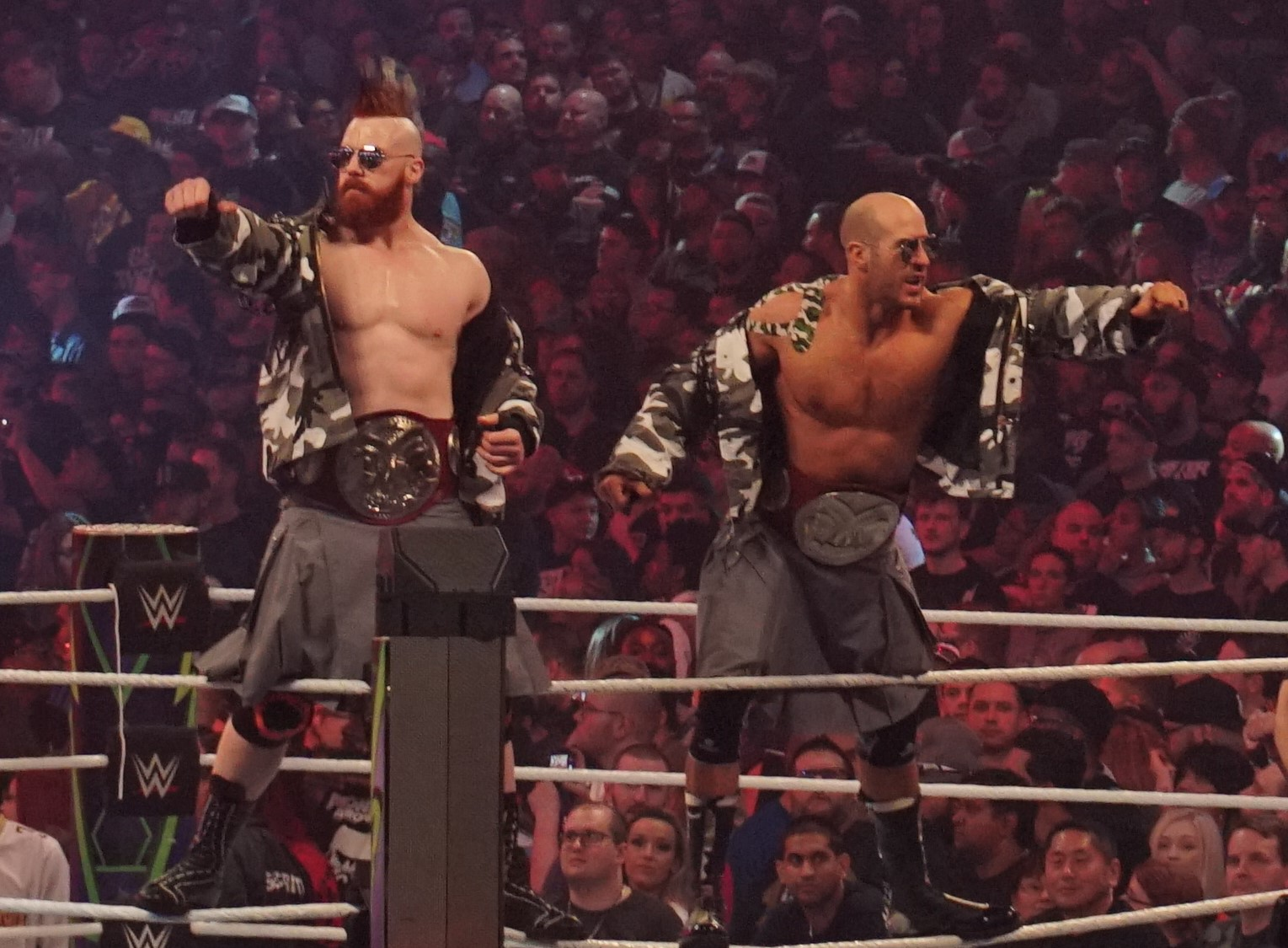
The Bar as the Raw Tag Team Champions at WrestleMania 34

On 28 January 2018, The Bar won back the title at the Royal Rumble, becoming record four-time champions as a team, and a record fifth reign for Cesaro individually. Following consecutive losses to Titus Worldwide (Apollo Crews and Titus O'Neil) on Raw, they defended their title against the two on 25 February at Elimination Chamber, retaining successfully. On the 12 March episode of Raw, Braun Strowman won a tag team battle royal to determine the number one contenders for their tag titles at WrestleMania 34, although he lacked a partner. Raw General Manager Kurt Angle still allowed Strowman to wrestle for the titles, under the provision that he reveal his mystery partner at the event. At the event on 8 April, Strowman revealed his partner to be a 10-year-old fan called Nicholas (in reality the son of referee John Cone). The Bar were defeated by Strowman and Nicholas, therefore losing the tag team title and in turn making Nicholas the youngest champion of any kind in WWE history.

On 17 April, as part of the 2018 WWE Superstar Shake-up, Cesaro and Sheamus were both drafted to SmackDown. Despite the trade, they still had an opportunity to challenge for the Raw Tag Team Championship as they faced Matt Hardy and Bray Wyatt at Greatest Royal Rumble event on 27 April, but they were defeated. At Super Show-Down on 6 October, The Bar challenged The New Day for the SmackDown Tag Team Championship, but were defeated. However, on the 1000th episode of SmackDown, The Bar won the titles from The New Day with the help of Big Show. The Bar lost to Raw Tag Team Champions AOP in an inter-brand Champion vs. Champion match at Survivor Series on 18 November. On the 27 November episode of SmackDown, they had a backstage argument with Big Show, causing him to break away from the team. At TLC: Tables, Ladders & Chairs on 16 December, they successfully defended the championship against The Usos and The New Day in a triple threat tag team match. At Royal Rumble pay-per-view on 27 January 2019, The Bar lost the championship to The Miz and Shane McMahon. On the following episode of SmackDown, they lost a #1 contenders match to The Usos.

At WrestleMania 35 on 7 April, The Bar lost to The Usos in a fatal-four-way tag team match for the SmackDown Tag Team Championships, which also included the teams of Aleister Black and Ricochet and Rusev and Shinsuke Nakamura. On 9 April SmackDown, Sheamus reportedly suffered a concussion in a six-man tag team match with The New Day. Cesaro was drafted to Raw a few weeks later, while Sheamus remained on SmackDown, bringing an end to the team.

==== The Artist Collective (2019–2021) ====
On the 20 May episode of Raw, Cesaro debuted a new entrance theme and titantron separate from The Bar as he defeated Ricochet. He also adopted a new part of his gimmick where he would only allow backstage interviewers to ask him only one question before walking away. Over the following weeks, Cesaro and Ricochet traded wins with each other. Their series of matches received praise from critics. At Extreme Rules on 14 July, Cesaro lost to Aleister Black. Cesaro would go on to issue an open challenge at NXT UK TakeOver: Cardiff on 31 August, which would be answered by Ilja Dragunov and Cesaro would go on to win the match. Cesaro would enter the 2019 King of the Ring tournament but was eliminated by Samoa Joe in the first round.

As part of the draft in October, Cesaro was drafted back to the SmackDown brand. He lost to Mansoor on 31 October at Crown Jewel. In the following weeks, Cesaro would align himself with Sami Zayn and Shinsuke Nakamura, teaming with Nakamura on several occasions, including challenging for the SmackDown Tag Team Championship, where they were unsuccessful. On 26 January 2020, at Royal Rumble, Cesaro entered at #9 but was eliminated by Brock Lesnar. At Elimination Chamber on 8 March, Sami Zayn, along with Nakamura and Cesaro, defeated Braun Strowman in 3-on-1 handicap match for the Intercontinental Championship. Zayn became the new champion pinning Strowman. On the first night of WrestleMania 36 on 4 April, Cesaro defeated Drew Gulak on the kickoff show. At Money in the Bank on 10 May, Cesaro was defeated by Jeff Hardy on the kickoff show.

Following this, Cesaro began teaming with Nakamura more frequently as they feuded with The New Day for the SmackDown Tag Team Titles. On the 10 July episode of SmackDown, Cesaro and Nakamura challenged New Day for the titles but the match ended in a no contest after Cesaro and Nakamura put Kofi Kingston and Big E through a table. On 19 July at The Horror Show at Extreme Rules, Cesaro and Nakamura defeated Kingston and Big E in a tables match to capture the titles, marking Cesaro's second reign. On the 9 October episode of SmackDown, they lost the titles to Kofi Kingston and Xavier Woods.

==== Various feuds and departure (2021–2022) ====
In early 2021, Cesaro and Nakamura quietly disbanded after Nakamura turned face. At Royal Rumble on 31 January, he entered at #28, but was eliminated by Braun Strowman. On the 5 February episode of SmackDown Cesaro gave Daniel Bryan a fist bump as a show of respect after their match, turning face for the first time since 2017.

The following week on SmackDown, Cesaro began a feud with Seth Rollins, after Rollins attacked him from behind following a walkout by the SmackDown roster. At Elimination Chamber on 21 February, Cesaro competed in the Elimination Chamber match where the winner would receive an immediate Universal Championship match, eliminating King Corbin but was the second to last man eliminated by Jey Uso. On the 26 March episode of SmackDown, he was challenged by Rollins to a match at WrestleMania 37, which Cesaro accepted. On the first night of WrestleMania on 10 April, Cesaro defeated Rollins. Cesaro faced Universal Champion Roman Reigns at WrestleMania Backlash on 16 May, but was defeated. After the match, Rollins attacked Cesaro and would continue to ambush him on subsequent episodes of SmackDown, culminating in Cesaro being taken out on a stretcher on the 21 May episode. Cesaro would make his return on the 11 June episode of SmackDown, attacking Rollins. A rematch would be scheduled for Hell in a Cell on 20 June the following week in which Rollins defeated Cesaro. He once again lost to Rollins on the 9 July episode of SmackDown, failing to qualify for that year's Money in the Bank ladder match and ending the feud.

In October, he entered the King of the Ring tournament, where he lost to Finn Bálor in the first round. At Survivor Series on 21 November, Cesaro participated in a 25-man dual-branded battle royal to commemorate the 25th anniversary of The Rock's debut at the 1996 Survivor Series, which was won by Omos. On the following episode of SmackDown, he failed to win a Black Friday Invitational battle royal where the winner would become the #1 contender for the Universal Championship. On 24 December (taped 17 December) episode of SmackDown, Cesaro competed in a gauntlet match for #1 contendership to the Intercontinental Championship, but was eliminated by Sheamus.

At the Day 1 pre-show on 1 January 2022, Cesaro and Ricochet lost to Sheamus and Ridge Holland. On the 11 February episode of SmackDown, Cesaro was defeated by Happy Corbin in what would be his last televised match in WWE. He quietly left WWE when his contract expired on 24 February, thus ending his 11-year tenure in the company. Reports stated that he was not actively looking to leave WWE, but did not like the contract extension offer he received.

=== All Elite Wrestling / Return to ROH (2022–present) ===
==== Blackpool Combat Club (2022–2024) ====
Castagnoli made his surprise debut for All Elite Wrestling (AEW) at the Forbidden Door event on 26 June 2022, replacing Bryan Danielson, who was injured and unable to compete in his match against Zack Sabre Jr. Castagnoli defeated Sabre Jr., and became the newest member of the Blackpool Combat Club (BCC), alongside Danielson, Jon Moxley and Wheeler Yuta. Several days later at the Blood and Guts event, Claudio, Moxley and Yuta teamed with Eddie Kingston and the duo of Santana and Ortiz to defeat the Jericho Appreciation Society (Chris Jericho, Sammy Guevara, Daniel Garcia, Matt Menard, Angelo Parker, and Jake Hager) in a Blood and Guts match. At the ROH Death Before Dishonor event on 23 July, he defeated Jonathan Gresham to win the ROH World Championship, capturing the first major world title of his career. AEW's Battle of the Belts III event on 5 August, he successfully defended the championship against Konosuke Takeshita. At All Out on 4 September, Castagnoli competed in the Casino Ladder Match, but was unsuccessful. At AEW's Grand Slam event on 21 September, Castagnoli lost the ROH World Championship to Jericho, ending his reign at 60 days. Castagnoli unsuccessfully challenged for the championship at AEW Full Gear on 18 November in a four-way match also involving Bryan Danielson and Sammy Guevara, before defeating Jericho at ROH Final Battle on 10 December to reclaim the championship for the second time.

At Supercard of Honor on 31 March 2023, Castagnoli successfully defended the championship against Eddie Kingston in the main event. In the month, the BCC became villainous characters, and defeated The Elite (Kenny Omega, Adam Page and The Young Bucks) in an Anarchy in the Arena match at Double or Nothing. At the Forbidden Door event on 25 June, Castagnoli, Moxley and Yuta teamed with Takeshita and Shota Umino to take on Page, The Young Bucks and Tomohiro Ishii in a ten-man tag team match, but were defeated. On 19 July at Blood and Guts, the Blackpool Combat Club, Takeshita, and Pac were defeated by The Elite in a Blood and Guts match. At Death Before Dishonor, Castagnoli defeated Pac to retain the championship. The Blackpool Combat Club continued to feud with Kingston, leading to a Stadium Stampede match at All In, which was won by Kingston, Pentagón Jr., Best Friends (Chuck Taylor and Trent Beretta) and Orange Cassidy. Castagnoli and Kingston finally faced off on 20 September at Grand Slam, in a title vs title match for Castagnoli's ROH World Championship and Kingston's NJPW Strong Openweight Championship, where Castagnoli lost the ROH title to Kingston. Following the match, the two men adhered to the Code of Honor, shaking hands thus ending the two men's 15+ year rivalry and turning Castagnoli face. Castagnoli was a participant in the inaugural Continental Classic, where was in the Blue block and finished with 7 points, but failed to advance to the playoff stage. On the 27 April 2024 episode of AEW Collision, Castagnoli unsuccessfully challenged Swerve Strickland for the AEW World Championship.

On the 21 August episode of Dynamite, Castagnoli and Kazuchika Okada fought to a 20-minute time limit draw for the AEW Continental Championship. On 25 August at All In, Castagnoli and Yuta teamed with Pac in the Four-way London Ladder match for the AEW World Trios Championship, which they won.

==== Death Riders (2024–present) ====
At All Out, Castagnoli and Yuta failed to win the AEW World Tag Team Championship from The Young Bucks. Later on in the show, Castagnoli and Moxley violently attacked Danielson and kicked him out of the BCC, turning them into heels in the process. On 28 September at the Collision edition of Grand Slam, Castagnoli, Pac, and Yuta successfully defended their titles against Komander and Private Party. In November 2024, the BCC rebranded to the "Death Riders", a nod to Moxley's nickname in NJPW. On 24 November, Castagnoli was announced as a participant in the 2024 Continental Classic, where he was placed in the Gold league. Castagnoli finished the tournament with 9 points, but failed to advance to the playoff stage due to losing a tiebreaker to Will Ospreay.

During Moxley's world title reign from October 2024 to July 2025, Castagnoli and the other members of the Death Riders would constantly interfere in Moxley's title defenses to help him retain. On 6 April 2025 at Dynasty, Castagnoli, Pac, and Yuta successfully defended their titles against Rated FTR. On 16 April at Dynamite: Spring BreakThru, Castagnoli and Yuta with Moxley filling in for an injured Pac lost the trios titles to Powerhouse Hobbs and The Opps (Samoa Joe and Katsuyori Shibata), ending their reign at 234 days. On 17 April at Collision: Spring BreakThru, Castagnoli accepted Adam Cole's open challenge for the AEW TNT Championship, but failed to win the title. On 25 May at Double or Nothing, the Death Riders teamed with The Young Bucks, losing to Kenny Omega, Swerve Strickland, Willow Nightingale, and The Opps (Samoa Joe, Powerhouse Hobbs, and Katsuyori Shibata) in an Anarchy in the Arena match. On 12 July at All In, Castagnoli and Yuta with Gabe Kidd failed to regain the trios titles from The Opps. The Death Riders were defeated by Darby Allin, Roderick Strong, and The Conglomeration (Mark Briscoe, Orange Cassidy, and Kyle O'Reilly) in Blood and Guts match on 12 November at the namesake event. On November 24, Castagnoli was announced as a participant in the 2025 Continental Classic, where he was placed in the Blue League. Castagnoli finished the tournament with 7 points, including a win over Moxley, but failed advanced to the semi-finals.

In May 2026, Castagnoli entered the Owen Hart Cup, losing to Brody King in the quarterfinals on the May 27 episode of Dynamite. On the October 21 episode of Dynamite, the Death Riders all officially turned face after they and The Conglomeration were all attacked by The Dogs and the Bang Bang Gang, who turned heel.

=== New Japan Pro-Wrestling (2023; 2025–2026) ===
Castagnoli made his debut for New Japan Pro-Wrestling (NJPW) at the Dominion 6.4 in Osaka-jo Hall event on 4 June 2023, teaming with Jon Moxley and Shota Umino to unsuccessfully face Kazuchika Okada, Hiroshi Tanahashi and Tomohiro Ishii in a six-man tag team match for the NEVER Openweight 6-Man Tag Team Championships. On 5 January 2025 at Wrestle Dynasty, Castagnoli was defeated by Umino. On 27 September 2026 at Destruction in Kobe, Castagonli was defeated by Shingo Takagi.

=== Consejo Mundial de Lucha Libre (2024–present) ===
Castagnoli made his Consejo Mundial de Lucha Libre (CMLL) debut on 29 March 2024, at Homenaje a Dos Leyendas, teaming with Bryan Danielson, Jon Moxley and Matt Sydal in a loss to Volador Jr., Blue Panther, Místico and Último Guerrero. On 23 August, he won the 2024 International Grand Prix as a member of Team World. On 28 November 2025, Castagnoli defeated Gran Guerrero to win the CMLL World Heavyweight Championship for the first time in his career. He made his first successful title defense against Último Guerrero on 19 December. Over the following months, Castagnoli retained the title against Xelhua, Akuma and Euforia in a three-way match, and Guerrero once more.

On 18 March 2026, it was announced that Castagnoli had signed with CMLL, while also keeping his contract with AEW. At Homenaje a Dos Leyendas two days later, Castagnoli lost the CMLL World Heavyweight Championship to Hechicero. On September 18 at the CMLL 93rd Anniversary Show, Castagnoli failed to regain the title from Hechicero in a three-way match, also involving Zack Sabre Jr..

== Professional wrestling style and persona ==
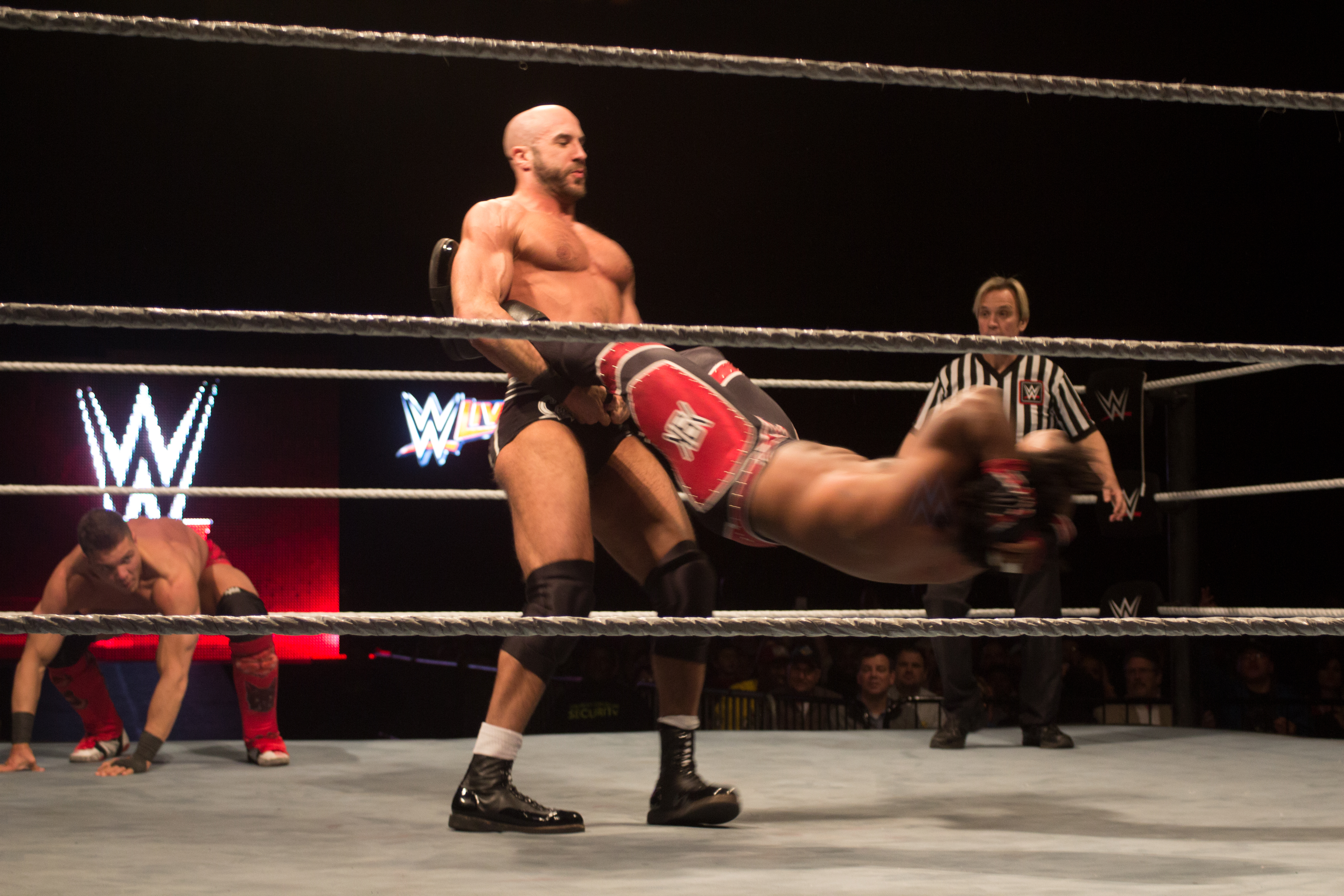
Castagnoli performing the "Giant Swing" during a house show in January 2015.

Castagnoli's wrestling ability has been praised by fellow wrestlers and wrestling icons such as Stone Cold Steve Austin, Mick Foley, Jim Ross, and William Regal. In 2019, Bleacher Report called him one of the best "pure wrestlers" in WWE. Criticism was levied at WWE by fans for underutilizing Castagnoli creatively on their shows. Later in his career, he became known as a "tag team specialist" due to his successful partnerships with Jack Swagger, Tyson Kidd, Sheamus, and Shinsuke Nakamura.

Castagnoli uses a "no-nonsense", European style as the basis for his move set. He uses the Gotch Neutralizer (a belly-to-back inverted mat slam) and Very European Uppercut (a pop-up European uppercut) as finishing moves. He also uses the giant swing. A big part of his wrestling style comes from his strength, which he has showcased by lifting heavier wrestlers such as The Great Khali, Brodus Clay, and Big Show, all of whom outweigh him by at least 100 lb (45.3 kg). He has been credited as one of the strongest wrestlers in WWE. His technical ability is also notable, and he has utilized the sharpshooter (adopted from his former tag team partner Kidd) as a signature move since 2015.

Castagnoli has been usually labeled as an underrated wrestler. From 2013 to 2016, he won the "Most Underrated Wrestler" award by Wrestling Observer Newsletter. In December 2020, Drew McIntyre called him the most underrated superstar in WWE.

Around the time of Castagnoli's shoulder injury in 2015, a number of prominent wrestling legends had increasingly been calling for WWE to move him into a more significant role in the company. In the months prior, former champion Mick Foley voiced strong support, declaring the day after Castagnoli's second United States Championship match with John Cena that "[Castagnoli] would make a great world champion". Foley later added that he was baffled by WWE's treatment of Castagnoli, stating that if he could make one change to WWE, it would simply be to "push [Castagnoli]". Just days before the injury was announced, Ric Flair answered a question on which current wrestler he thought should have already been WWE World Heavyweight Champion by discussing how he thought Castagnoli was "phenomenal" and that "nobody [brought] more to the table as a performer". Flair further stated that he thought Castagnoli could be built up for a major storyline with Brock Lesnar within two months, even suggesting for himself to become Castagnoli's manager to help with his work on the microphone. Meanwhile, long-time Castagnoli supporter Stone Cold Steve Austin reiterated that he believed Castagnoli had what was needed "to go up on top of the card" and blamed WWE for not helping him more.

== Personal life ==
Castagnoli resides in Orlando, Florida. In addition to his native Swiss German, he is fluent in English, French, German, and Italian. He is known for his love of coffee, having maintained a blog and YouTube channel called Claudio's Café before joining WWE. Claudio's Café is now the name of his secondary Instagram page and his Twitch channel, the former of which he uses to document his visits to coffee shops worldwide.

Castagnoli has been in a relationship with American professional wrestling trainer and former wrestler Sara Amato, better known as Sara Del Rey, since 2011. He is close friends with Canadian professional wrestling producer and former wrestler TJ Wilson, better known as Tyson Kidd, with whom he had originally been paired as a tag team by WWE without either man's input before the two became friends. He is also close friends with his former tag team partner Ares and Ares' wife Allison Danger.

Castagnoli is a fan of franchises such as James Bond, which he incorporated into his WWE gimmick from 2016 to 2018, and Star Wars. He also enjoys watching football. Having once been a supporter of hometown club FC Luzern, he no longer supports a professional club, instead preferring to follow the individual careers of players of the Swiss national team. He has said that he prides himself on being a consummate professional in every aspect: "Older values of older times, that are not as much around anymore, are still very important to me. [...] You have to be a professional in every single thing you do."

Noted for his exceptional physical strength and stating that he is completely steroid-free, Castagnoli has performed a one-arm snatch with 145 lbs (66 kg), a one-arm clean and jerk with 135 lbs (61 kg), and a two-arm clean and jerk with 286 lbs (130 kg). He described his training regime in 2015 as a mix of different approaches, with particular focus on CrossFit and variations of Olympic weightlifting. He has said that he continually tries to learn new ways to work out in order to keep improving.

As an avid gamer, Castagnoli invested into mobile gaming esports organization Tribe Gaming in 2020.

== Other media ==
Castagnoli made a brief appearance in the 2008 drama film The Wrestler. He regularly appeared on the WWE web series The JBL and Cole Show until its cancellation in June 2015. He has also made brief appearances on the E! show Total Divas.

Castagnoli became a fan of League of Legends after practicing the game prior to the WWE vs NXT League of Legends match, and has been a guest analyst during the North American League of Legends Championship series.

As "Cesaro", Castagnoli is a playable character in WWE '13 (as downloadable content), WWE 2K14, WWE 2K15, WWE 2K16, WWE 2K17, WWE 2K18, WWE 2K19, WWE 2K20, WWE 2K Battlegrounds, and WWE 2K22. As Claudio Castagnoli, he was added as a playable character to AEW Fight Forever as downloadable content.

== Championships and accomplishments ==
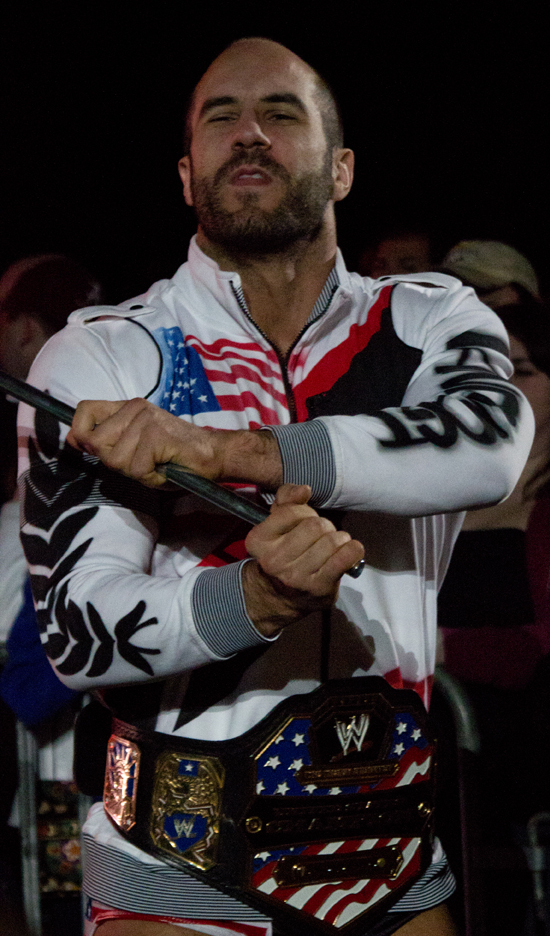
Castagnoli is a former WWE United States Champion...

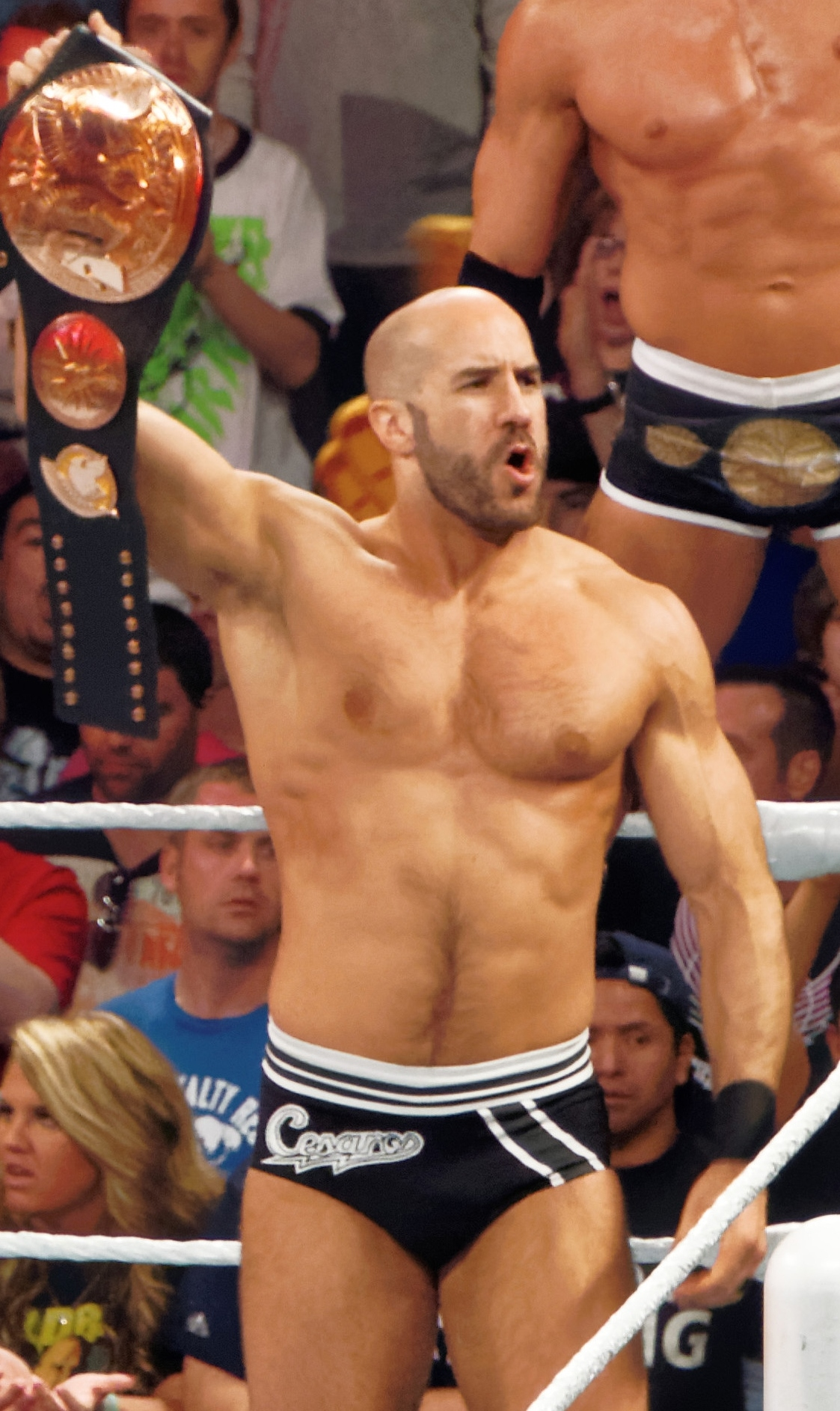
...a seven-time Tag Team Champion (including five WWE/Raw Tag Team Championships)...

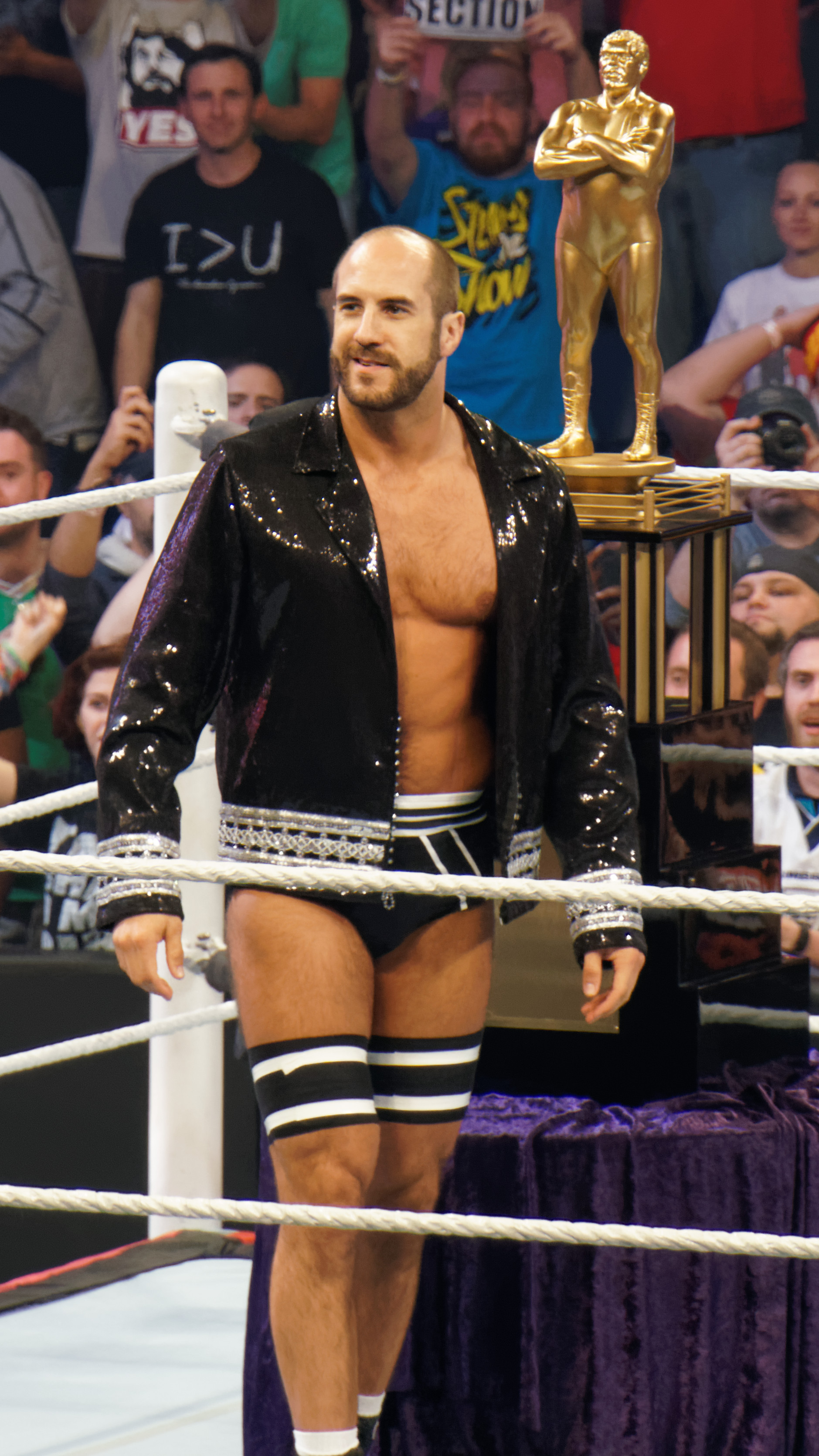
...and won the inaugural André the Giant Memorial Battle Royal trophy at WrestleMania XXX

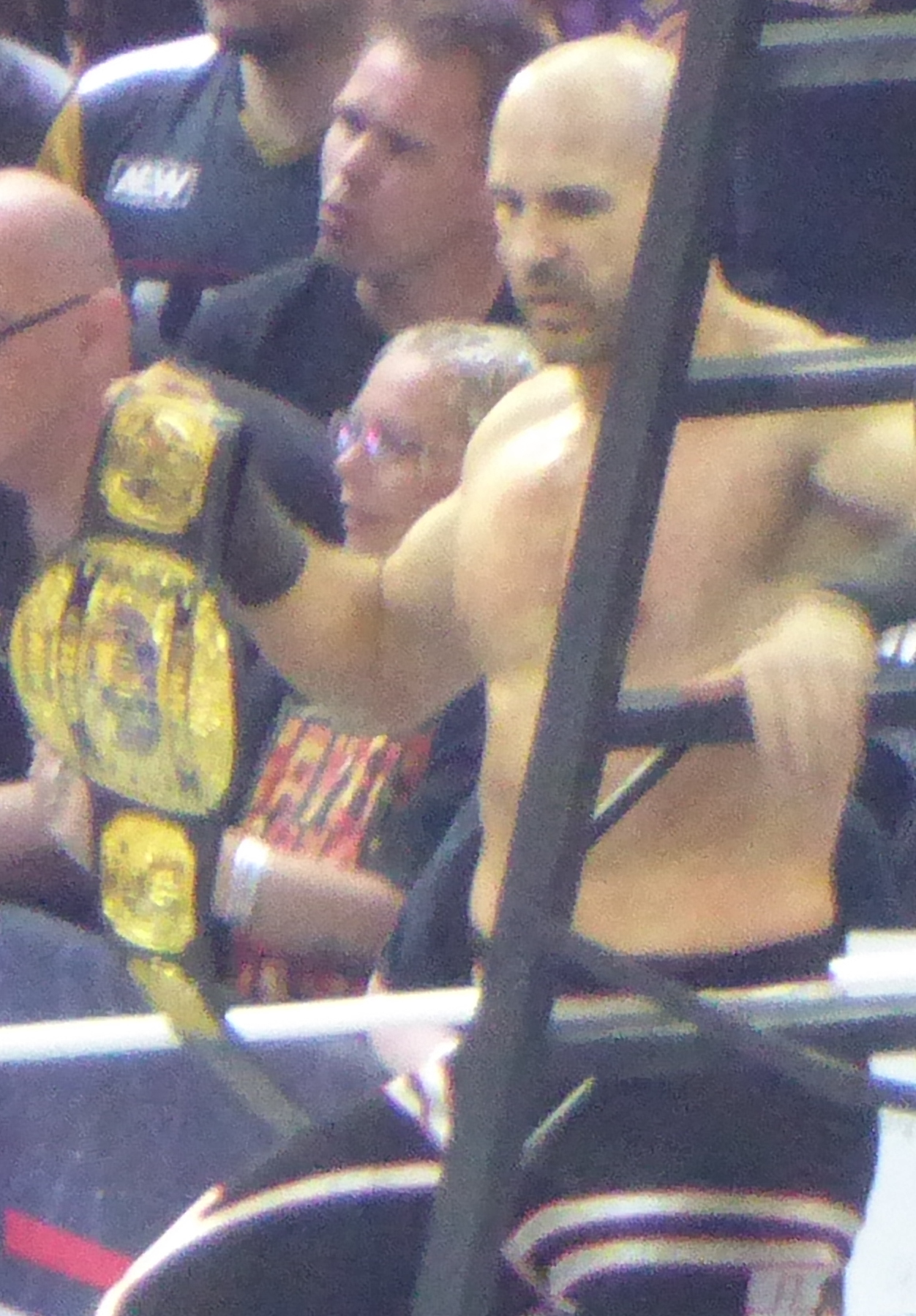
Castagnoli as AEW World Trios Champion

- All Elite Wrestling
  - AEW World Trios Championship (1 time) – with Pac and Wheeler Yuta
- Chikara
  - Chikara Campeonatos de Parejas (2 times) – with Chris Hero (1) and Ares (1)
  - King of Trios (2010) – with Ares and Tursas
  - Tag World Grand Prix (2005) – with Arik Cannon
  - Tag World Grand Prix (2006) – with Chris Hero
  - Torneo Cibernético (2007)
- Cleveland All-Pro Wrestling
  - CAPW Unified Heavyweight Championship (1 time)
- Consejo Mundial de Lucha Libre
  - CMLL World Heavyweight Championship (1 time)
  - International Gran Prix (2024)
- Combat Zone Wrestling
  - CZW World Tag Team Championship (2 times) – with Chris Hero
  - Last Team Standing (2006) – with Chris Hero
- German Stampede Wrestling
  - GSW Tag Team Championship (2 times) – with Ares
- Juggalo Championship Wrestling
  - JCW Tag Team Championship (1 time) – with Chris Hero
- Independent Wrestling Association: Switzerland
  - IWA Switzerland World Heavyweight Championship (1 time)
- International Pro Wrestling: United Kingdom
  - IPW:UK Tag Team Championship (1 time) – with Ares
- Pro Wrestling Guerrilla
  - PWG World Championship (1 time)
- Pro Wrestling Illustrated
  - Ranked No. 12 of the top 500 singles wrestlers in the PWI 500 in 2023
- Pro Wrestling Noah
  - Global Tag League Fighting Spirit Award (2011) – with Chris Hero
  - Global Tag League Technique Award (2010) – with Chris Hero
- Revolution Pro Wrestling
  - Undisputed British Tag Team Championship (1 time) – with Ares
- Ring of Honor
  - ROH World Championship (2 times)
  - ROH World Tag Team Championship (2 times) – with Chris Hero
  - Race to the Top Tournament (2007)
  - Tag Wars Tournament (2010) – with Chris Hero
- Swiss Wrestling Federation
  - SWF Powerhouse Championship (1 time)
  - SWF Tag Team Championship (1 time) – with Ares
  - SWF Powerhouse Championship Tournament (2001)
- Westside Xtreme Wrestling
  - wXw World Heavyweight Championship (2 time)
  - wXw Tag Team Championship (3 times) – with Ares
- Wrestling Observer Newsletter
  - Most Underrated (2013–2016)
  - Tag Team of the Year (2010) with Chris Hero
- WWE
  - WWE United States Championship (1 time)
  - WWE Raw Tag Team Championship (5 times) (Note: The title was named the WWE Tag Team Championship during his first reign.) – with Tyson Kidd (1) and Sheamus (4)
  - WWE SmackDown Tag Team Championship (2 times) – with Sheamus (1) and Shinsuke Nakamura (1)
  - André the Giant Memorial Battle Royal (2014)
  - Slammy Award for Best John Cena U.S. Open Challenge (2015)
  - WWE Year-End Award for Tag Team of the Year (2018) – with Sheamus
