= ROH Respect is Earned =

- Promotions: Ring of Honor
- First event: Respect is Earned (2007)
- Last event: Respect is Earned II

ROH Respect Is Earned was a professional wrestling pay-per-view (PPV) event produced by Ring of Honor.

== Events ==
| # | Event | Date | Venue | City | Main Event |
|---|---|---|---|---|---|
| 1 | Respect is Earned (2007) | May 12, 2007 (taped); July 1, 2007 (aired) | Manhattan Center | New York, New York | Takeshi Morishima and Bryan Danielson vs. Nigel McGuinness and KENTA |
| 2 | Respect is Earned II | June 7, 2008 (taped); August 1, 2008 (aired) | Pennsylvania National Guard Armory | Philadelphia, Pennsylvania | The Age of the Fall (Jimmy Jacobs and Tyler Black) (c) vs. Austin Aries and Bryan Danielson for the ROH World Tag Team Championship. |
(c) – refers to the champion(s) heading into the match
