= Shimmer Volumes =

DVDs produced by Shimmer Women Athletes

Shimmer Volumes are the DVDs produced by the all-female professional wrestling promotion Shimmer Women Athletes. Since 2005, it has had 86 releases, with the most recent releases (82-91) being two volume, two disc sets, representing one night of events each, a practice not done since the out of print special edition of volume 1-2. Each volume is intended for release on DVD but about eight years behind the actual live dates, with many (including volumes 91, 100, and 109-113) appearing in Streaming VOD services in the meantime. Official information on these releases regularly appears on the Shimmer Wrestling website, though no updates on DVDs have appeared since late 2024 after the promotion folded. To date, all but 13 of the events have been recorded live at the Berwyn Eagles Club.

== Volume 1 ==
Shimmer Women Athletes Volume 1
- Promotion: Shimmer Women Athletes
- Date: November 6, 2005
- City: Berwyn, Illinois
- Venue: The Eagles Club
- Attendance: 180

No.	Results	Stipulations	Times
1^{D}	Jimmy Jacobs won (Note: Other participants were Austin Aries, Alex Shelley, Claudio Castagnoli, Delirious, Trik Davis, Danny Daniels, Brad Bradley, Matt Sydal, Dan Lawrence and Bryce Benjamin)	Battle royal	—
2	Shantelle Taylor defeated Tiana Ringer	Singles match	8:39
3	Team Blondage (Amber O'Neal and Krissy Vaine) defeated Cindy Rogers and Nikki Roxx	Tag team match	12:56
4	Ariel defeated Rain	Singles match	8:50
5	MsChif defeated Cheerleader Melissa by	Singles match	15:05
6	Lexie Fyfe defeated Christie Ricci by	Singles match	8:26
7	Allison Danger defeated Beth Phoenix by	Singles match	10:44
8	Sara Del Rey vs. Mercedes Martinez ended in a time limit draw	Singles match	20:00
9	Daizee Haze defeated Lacey	Singles match	23:25
D / – this was a dark match

== Volume 2 ==
Shimmer Women Athletes Volume 2
- Promotion: Shimmer Women Athletes
- Date: November 6, 2005
- City: Berwyn, Illinois
- Venue: The Eagles Club
- Attendance: 180

No.	Results	Stipulations	Times
1	Cindy Rogers defeated Krissy Vaine by submission	Singles match	7:57
2	Nikki Roxx defeated Lexie Fyfe	Singles match	8:59
3	Cheerleader Melissa and Tiana Ringer defeated Ariel and Shantelle Taylor	Tag team match	10:41
4	Christie Ricci defeated Amber O'Neal	Singles match	7:47
5	Allison Danger defeated Rain	Singles match	13:19
6	Beth Phoenix defeated MsChif	Singles match	8:26
7	Sara Del Rey defeated Daizee Haze, Lacey and Mercedes Martinez	Four-way elimination match	17:12

Four-way match eliminations
Eliminated	Wrestler	Eliminated by	Method of elimination	Time
1	Lacey	Mercedes Martinez	pinned after a fisherman buster	12:53
2	Mercedes Martinez	Daizee Haze	pinned after a yakuza kick	15:03
3	Daizee Haze	Sara Del Rey	pinned after a Royal Butterfly	17:12
Winner	Sara Del Rey			17:12

== Volume 3 ==
Shimmer Women Athletes Volume 3
- Promotion: Shimmer Women Athletes
- Date: February 12, 2006
- City: Berwyn, Illinois
- Venue: The Eagles Club
- Attendance: 180

No.	Results	Stipulations	Times
1	Rain defeated Nikki Roxx	Singles match	10:16
2	Cindy Rogers defeated Amber O'Neal and Tiana Ringer by submission	Three-way elimination match	7:22
3	Lorelei Lee defeated Malia Hosaka	Singles match	11:56
4	Lexie Fyfe defeated MsChif	Singles match	10:38
5	Cheerleader Melissa defeated Shantelle Taylor	Singles match	17:40
6	Rebecca Knox defeated Allison Danger	Singles match	22:56
7	Sara Del Rey defeated Daizee Haze	Singles match	19:51

Three-way match eliminations
Eliminated	Wrestler	Eliminated by	Method of elimination	Time
1	Amber O'Neal	Cindy Rogers	pinned after a sitout facebuster	5:05
2	Tiana Ringer	Cindy Rogers	submitted to the TCB	7:22
Winner	Cindy Rogers			7:22

== Volume 4 ==
Shimmer Women Athletes Volume 4
- Promotion: Shimmer Women Athletes
- Date: February 12, 2006
- City: Berwyn, Illinois
- Venue: The Eagles Club
- Attendance: 180

No.	Results	Stipulations	Times
1	Nikki Roxx defeated Amber O'Neal	Singles match	9:22
2	Shantelle Taylor defeated Ann Brookstone	Singles match	5:53
3	The Experience (Lexie Fyfe and Malia Hosaka) defeated Cindy Rogers and Lorelei Lee	Tag team match	16:01
4	Allison Danger defeated Tiana Ringer	Singles match	11:09
5	Sara Del Rey defeated Rain	Singles match	14:08
6	Cheerleader Melissa defeated MsChif by submission	Falls Count Anywhere match	26:13
7	Daizee Haze defeated Rebecca Knox	Singles match	20:14

== Volume 5 ==
Shimmer Women Athletes Volume 5
- Promotion: Shimmer Women Athletes
- Date: May 21, 2006
- City: Berwyn, Illinois
- Venue: The Eagles Club
- Attendance: 180

No.	Results	Stipulations	Times
1^{D}	Daizee Haze defeated Portia Perez	Singles match	2:31
2	Rain defeated Lorelei Lee	Singles match	9:17
3	MsChif defeated Cindy Rogers	Singles match	8:00
4	Amber O'Neal defeated Serena Deeb	Singles match	8:16
5	The Experience (Lexie Fyfe and Malia Hosaka) defeated Ariel and Josie	Tag team match	11:55
6	Allison Danger defeated Cheerleader Melissa	Singles match	9:45
7	Amazing Kong defeated Nikki Roxx	Singles match	10:39
8	Nikita defeated Lacey	Singles match	14:54
9	Rebecca Knox defeated Daizee Haze	Two-out-of-three falls match	28:03
10	Sara Del Rey defeated Mercedes Martinez	No Time Limit match	24:00
D / – this was a dark match

== Volume 6 ==
Shimmer Women Athletes Volume 6
- Promotion: Shimmer Women Athletes
- Date: May 21, 2006
- City: Berwyn, Illinois
- Venue: The Eagles Club
- Attendance: 180

No.	Results	Stipulations	Times
1	Serena Deeb defeated Amber O'Neal	Singles match	7:27
2	Amazing Kong and The Experience (Lexie Fyfe and Malia Hosaka) defeated Ariel, Cindy Rogers and Josie	Six-woman tag team match	16:40
3	Nikki Roxx defeated Lorelei Lee	Singles match	8:44
4	Daizee Haze defeated Nikita	Singles match	11:40
5	Rebecca Knox defeated Allison Danger	Pure Wrestling Rules match	25:46
6	The Minnesota Home Wrecking Crew (Lacey and Rain) defeated Sara Del Rey and Mercedes Martinez	Tag team match	15:48
7	MsChif defeated Cheerleader Melissa	Last Woman Standing match	20:20

== Volume 7 ==
Shimmer Women Athletes Volume 7
- Promotion: Shimmer Women Athletes
- Date: October 22, 2006
- City: Berwyn, Illinois
- Venue: The Eagles Club
- Attendance: 180

No.	Results	Stipulations	Times
1	Tiana Ringer defeated Lorelei Lee	Singles match	5:29
2	Ariel defeated Cindy Rogers	Singles match	8:42
3	The Experience (Lexie Fyfe and Malia Hosaka) defeated Serena Deeb and Portia Perez	Tag team match	6:58
4	MsChif defeated Rain by disqualification	Singles match	8:30
5	Allison Danger defeated Amber O'Neal by submission	Singles match	12:21
6	Nikki Roxx defeated Lacey	Singles match	14:59
7	Mercedes Martinez defeated LuFisto	Singles match	13:06
8	Sara Del Rey defeated Nattie Neidhart	Singles match	19:45
9	Cheerleader Melissa defeated Daizee Haze	Singles match	21:52

== Volume 8 ==
Shimmer Women Athletes Volume 8
- Promotion: Shimmer Women Athletes
- Date: October 22, 2006
- City: Berwyn, Illinois
- Venue: The Eagles Club
- Attendance: 180

No.	Results	Stipulations	Times
1^{D}	Sara Del Rey defeated Lorelei Lee	Singles match	2:18
2	Lexie Fyfe defeated Lorelei Lee	Singles match	6:24
3	Cindy Rogers defeated Serena Deeb by submission	Singles match	8:16
4	LuFisto defeated Allison Danger by submission	Singles match	13:40
5	Amber O'Neal defeated Josie	Singles match	10:30
6	Nikki Roxx defeated Malia Hosaka	Singles match	11:21
7	Nattie Neidhart defeated Ariel by submission	Singles match	14:19
8	Daizee Haze defeated Tiana Ringer	Singles match	13:53
9	The Minnesota Home Wrecking Crew (Lacey and Rain) defeated Cheerleader Melissa and MsChif	Tag team match	15:07
10	Mercedes Martinez defeated Sara Del Rey	Singles match	18:46
D / – this was a dark match

== Volume 9 ==
Shimmer Women Athletes Volume 9
- Promotion: Shimmer Women Athletes
- Date: April 7, 2007
- City: Berwyn, Illinois
- Venue: The Eagles Club
- Attendance: 180

No.	Results	Stipulations	Times
1	Eden Black defeated Rain	Singles match	12:11
2	Ariel defeated Alexa Thatcher	Singles match	5:56
3	The Experience (Lexie Fyfe and Malia Hosaka) defeated Allison Danger and Cindy Rogers	Tag team match	15:12
4	Portia Perez defeated Josie	Singles match	7:33
5	Daizee Haze defeated Amber O'Neal	Singles match	8:43
6	Nikki Roxx defeated Tiana Ringer	Singles match	10:25
7	Lacey defeated Serena Deeb	Singles match	15:55
8	Amazing Kong defeated MsChif	Singles match	12:22
9	Sara Del Rey defeated Cheerleader Melissa	Singles match	19:19

== Volume 10 ==
Shimmer Women Athletes Volume 10
- Promotion: Shimmer Women Athletes
- Date: April 7, 2007
- City: Berwyn, Illinois
- Venue: The Eagles Club
- Attendance: 180

No.	Results	Stipulations	Times
1	Ariel defeated Portia Perez	Singles match	5:09
2	Rain defeated Alexa Thatcher, Josie and Malia Hosaka	Four-way match	8:56
3	Cindy Rogers defeated Allison Danger	Singles match	12:02
4	Serena Deeb defeated Lexie Fyfe	Singles match	7:39
5	MsChif (with Daffney) defeated Amber O'Neal	Singles match	6:40
6	Tiana Ringer defeated Eden Black	Singles match	9:54
7	Cheerleader Melissa defeated Lacey	Singles match	10:41
8	Amazing Kong defeated Daizee Haze	Singles match	11:05
9	Sara Del Rey defeated Nikki Roxx	Singles match	17:54

== Volume 11 ==
Shimmer Women Athletes Volume 11
- Promotion: Shimmer Women Athletes
- Date: June 1, 2007
- City: Berwyn, Illinois
- Venue: The Eagles Club
- Attendance: 180

No.	Results	Stipulations	Times
1	Malia Hosaka defeated Allison Danger	Shimmer Championship tournament first round match	9:21
2	Daizee Haze defeated Portia Perez	Shimmer Championship tournament first round match	5:46
3	Sara Del Rey defeated Cindy Rogers	Shimmer Championship tournament first round match	10:45
4	Alicia defeated Ariel^{1}	Shimmer Championship tournament first round match	6:15
5	MsChif (with Daffney) defeated Lexie Fyfe	Shimmer Championship tournament first round match	8:23
6	Sarah Stock defeated Cheerleader Melissa^{2}	Shimmer Championship tournament first round match	8:25
7	Lacey defeated Eden Black	Shimmer Championship tournament first round match	10:57
8	Nikki Roxx defeated Rain	Shimmer Championship tournament first round match	8:09
9	Daizee Haze defeated Malia Hosaka	Shimmer Championship tournament second round match	9:01
10	Sara Del Rey defeated Alicia	Shimmer Championship tournament second round match	9:00
11	Sarah Stock defeated MsChif (with Daffney)	Shimmer Championship tournament second round match	9:12
12	Lacey defeated Nikki Roxx	Shimmer Championship tournament second round match	16:21

^{1}: Alicia substituted for Serena Deeb, who was unable to make it to the building in time for her match due to a car accident.

^{2}: Sarah Stock was listed as an 'International Wildcard' entry, having never competed in Shimmer before.

== Volume 12 ==
Shimmer Women Athletes Volume 12
- Promotion: Shimmer Women Athletes
- Date: June 2, 2007
- City: Berwyn, Illinois
- Venue: The Eagles Club
- Attendance: 180

No.	Results	Stipulations	Times
1	Josie defeated Alicia	Singles match	6:46
2	Lacey defeated Daizee Haze	Shimmer Championship tournament semi-final match	14:05
3	Sara Del Rey defeated Sarah Stock	Shimmer Championship tournament semi-final match	19:51
4	Allison Danger defeated Cindy Rogers	No Holds Barred Street Fight	13:10
5	Nikki Roxx defeated Ariel, Eden Black and Portia Perez	Four Corner Survival match	9:06
6	Rain defeated Serena Deeb	Singles match	9:56
7	Cheerleader Melissa and MsChif (with Daffney) defeated The Experience (Lexie Fyfe and Malia Hosaka)	Tag team match	18:14
8	Sara Del Rey defeated Lacey	Shimmer Championship tournament final match	19:33

First Round
MsChif	Pin
Lexie Fyfe	8:23
Cheerleader Melissa	8:25
Sarah Stock	Pin
Sara Del Rey	Pin
Cindy Rogers	10:45
Ariel	6:15
Alicia^{1}	Pin
Allison Danger	9:21
Malia Hosaka	Pin
Daizee Haze	Pin
Portia Perez	5:46
Lacey	Pin
Eden Black	10:57
Nikki Roxx	Pin
Rain	8:09

Quarterfinals
MsChif	9:12
Sarah Stock	Pin
Sara Del Rey	Pin
Alicia	9:00
Malia Hosaka	9:01
Daizee Haze	Pin
Lacey	Pin
Nikki Roxx	16:21

Semifinals
Sarah Stock	19:51
Sara Del Rey	Pin
Daizee Haze	14:05
Lacey	Pin

Final
Sara Del Rey	Pin
Lacey	19:33

== Volume 13 ==
Shimmer Women Athletes Volume 13
- Promotion: Shimmer Women Athletes
- Date: June 2, 2007
- City: Berwyn, Illinois
- Venue: The Eagles Club
- Attendance: 180

No.	Results	Stipulations	Times
1	Serena Deeb defeated Alicia	Singles match	10:13
2	Malia Hosaka defeated Josie	Singles match	6:08
3	MsChif (with Daffney) defeated Portia Perez	Singles match	6:19
4	Eden Black defeated Lexie Fyfe by submission	Singles match	7:45
5	Cheerleader Melissa defeated Ariel	Singles match	10:13
6	Sarah Stock defeated Daizee Haze	Singles match	18:07
7	Cindy Rogers defeated Allison Danger	Dog Collar Chain match	15:09
8	Nikki Roxx and Sara Del Rey defeated The Minnesota Home Wrecking Crew Lacey and Rain	Tag team match	11:51

== Volume 14: Hot Summer Nights ==
Shimmer Women Athletes Volume 14: Hot Summer Nights
- Promotion: Shimmer Women Athletes
- Date: July 1, 2007
- City: Inverness, Florida
- Venue: Citrus County Auditorium

No.	Results	Stipulations	Times
1^{D}	Roderick Strong (c) defeated Chasyn Rance, Masked Fipper #16 and Masked Sparkler	Four Corner Survival match for the FIP Heavyweight Championship	—
2	Ariel defeated Amber O'Neal	Singles match	9:15
3	Cindy Rogers defeated Allison Danger by technical submission	Two-out-of-three falls match	18:55
4	Lexie Fyfe defeated Daffney by submission	Singles match	6:36
5	Serena Deeb defeated Malia Hosaka	Singles match	11:31
6	Cheerleader Melissa defeated Rain	Singles match	14:17
7	Daizee Haze defeated MsChif	Singles match	17:45
8	Amazing Kong defeated Nikki Roxx	Singles match	14:43
9	Sara Del Rey (c) defeated Lacey by submission	Singles match for the Shimmer Championship	29:11
(c) / – the champion(s) heading into the match; D / – this was a dark match

== Volume 15 ==
Shimmer Women Athletes Volume 15
- Promotion: Shimmer Women Athletes
- Date: October 13, 2007
- City: Berwyn, Illinois
- Venue: The Eagles Club
- Attendance: 180

No.	Results	Stipulations	Times
1	Eden Black defeated Amber O'Neal by submission	Singles match	9:44
2	Nicole Matthews and Portia Perez defeated Ashley Lane and Lorelei Lee	Tag team match	4:44
3	Jetta defeated Serena Deeb	Singles match	9:53
4	Allison Danger defeated Cindy Rogers	Singles match	7:24
5	The Minnesota Home Wrecking Crew (Lacey and Rain defeated Ariel and Josie	Tag team match	11:03
6	Cheerleader Melissa defeated Alexa Thatcher	Singles match	10:20
7	The Experience (Lexie Fyfe and Malia Hosaka) defeated The Scream Queens (Daffney and MsChif)	Tag team match	11:15
8	Sarah Stock defeated Daizee Haze	Singles match to determine the #1 contender for the Shimmer Championship	18:55
9	Sara Del Rey (c) defeated Amazing Kong by countout	Singles match for the Shimmer Championship	16:40
(c) / – the champion(s) heading into the match

== Volume 16 ==
Shimmer Women Athletes Volume 16
- Promotion: Shimmer Women Athletes
- Date: October 13, 2007
- City: Berwyn, Illinois
- Venue: The Eagles Club
- Attendance: 180

No.	Results	Stipulations	Times
1	Lorelei Lee defeated Amber O'Neal	Singles match	9:43
2	Ariel and Josie defeated Nicole Matthews and Portia Perez	Tag team match	10:04
3	Alexa Thatcher defeated Ashley Lane	Singles match	4:57
4	The Experience (Lexie Fyfe and Malia Hosaka) defeated Allison Danger and Serena Deeb	Tag team match	11:56
5	Cindy Rogers defeated Daffney by submission	Singles match	5:39
6	Daizee Haze, Eden Black and MsChif defeated The Minnesota Home Wrecking Crew (Jetta, Lacey and Rain)	Six-woman tag team match	23:00
7	Amazing Kong defeated Cheerleader Melissa	Singles match	14:58
8	Sara Del Rey (c) defeated Sarah Stock	Two-out-of-three falls match for the Shimmer Championship	21:08
(c) / – the champion(s) heading into the match

=== Two-out-of-three falls match ===
Score	Fall	Decision	Notes	Time
0–1	Sara Del Rey	Pinfall	Sara Del Rey pinned Sarah Stock with a bridging German suplex	9:00
1–1	Sarah Stock	Pinfall	Sarah Stock pinned Sara Del Rey with a sunset flip	17:25
2–1	Sara Del Rey	Pinfall	Sara Del Rey pinned Sarah Stock with a roll-up	21:08

== Volume 17 ==
Shimmer Women Athletes Volume 17
- Promotion: Shimmer Women Athletes
- Date: April 26, 2008
- City: Berwyn, Illinois
- Venue: The Eagles Club

No.	Results	Stipulations	Times
1^{D}	Allison Danger defeated Cat Power	Singles match	—
2	The International Home Wrecking Crew (Jetta and Rain) defeated Danyah and Jennifer Blake by submission	Tag team match	12:37
3	Shark Girl defeated Nicole Matthews	Singles match	7:00
4	The Experience (Lexie Fyfe and Malia Hosaka) defeated Ashley Lane and Nevaeh	Tag team match	10:14
5	Amber O'Neal defeated Lorelei Lee	Singles match	5:20
6	Daizee Haze defeated Cindy Rogers	Singles match	10:04
7	Ariel defeated Amazing Kong by disqualification	Singles match	8:27
8	Mercedes Martinez defeated Wesna Busic	Singles match	12:34
9	Sarah Stock defeated Lacey	Singles match	17:38
10	Cheerleader Melissa and MsChif defeated The Dangerous Angels (Allison Danger and Sara Del Rey)	Tag team match	24:13
D / – this was a dark match

== Volume 18 ==
Shimmer Women Athletes Volume 18
- Promotion: Shimmer Women Athletes
- Date: April 26, 2008
- City: Berwyn, Illinois
- Venue: The Eagles Club

No.	Results	Stipulations	Times
1	Shark Girl defeated Amber O'Neal	Singles match	7:03
2	Nicole Matthews defeated Lorelei Lee	Singles match	7:37
3	Daizee Haze defeated Jetta	Singles match	11:16
4	The Experience (Lexie Fyfe and Malia Hosaka) defeated Danyah and Jennifer Blake	Tag team match	9:51
5	Ariel defeated Cat Power	Singles match	4:06
6	Mercedes Martinez defeated Cindy Rogers	Singles match	12:36
7	Ashley Lane and Nevaeh defeated The International Home Wrecking Crew (Lacey and Rain)	Tag team match	12:11
8	Amazing Kong defeated Wesna Busic	Singles match	10:20
9	Cheerleader Melissa defeated Sarah Stock	Singles match	20:22
10	MsChif defeated Sara Del Rey (c)	Singles match for the Shimmer Championship	16:21
(c) / – the champion(s) heading into the match

== Volume 19 ==
Shimmer Women Athletes Volume 19
- Promotion: Shimmer Women Athletes
- Date: July 05, 2008
- City: Berwyn, Illinois
- Venue: The Eagles Club

No.	Results	Stipulations	Times
1	Jetta won as Ariel was eliminated last	Battle royal for a Shimmer Championship match later in the night	11:51
2	Portia Perez defeated Shark Girl	Singles match	5:32
3	Serena Deeb defeated Danyah	Singles match	6:33
4	Ashley Lane and Nevaeh defeated Cat Power and Veronika Vice	Tag team match	7:00
5	Amazing Kong defeated Lorelei Lee	Singles match	4:23
6	Nikki Roxx defeated Nicole Matthews	Singles match	9:18
7	Allison Danger defeated Jennifer Blake	Singles match	9:52
8	LuFisto defeated Rain	Singles match	10:20
9	Sara Del Rey defeated Ariel	Singles match	14:26
10	Mercedes Martinez defeated Cheerleader Melissa	Singles match	15:47
11	MsChif (c) defeated Jetta	Singles match for the Shimmer Championship	14:04
(c) / – the champion(s) heading into the match

Battle Royal Entrances and Eliminations
Draw	Entrant	Order	Eliminated by	Time
1	Portia Perez	15	Amazing Kong	09:39
2	Serena Deeb	8	Sara Del Rey	07:33
3	Jennifer Blake	1	Portia Perez	00:35
4	Nicole Matthews	4	Ariel	03:18
5	Shark Girl	2	Portia Perez	02:09
6	Cat Power	3	Serena Deeb	01:57
7	Jetta	-	WINNER	08:47
8	LuFisto	9	Sara Del Rey	04:10
9	Veronika Vice	5	LuFisto	00:59
10	Ariel	20	Sara Del Rey	07:30
11	Rain	10	Ariel	02:47
12	Lorelei Lee	6	Rain	00:46
13	Cheerleader Melissa	13	Amazing Kong	03:21
14	Nevaeh	7	Sara Del Rey	00:39
15	Sara Del Rey	19	Ariel	04:24
16	Allison Danger	12	Amazing Kong	01:45
17	Danyah	11	Amazing Kong	01:09
18	Ashley Lane	14	Amazing Kong	01:06
19	Amazing Kong	16	Ariel, Mercedes Martinez and Del Rey	00:52
20	Mercedes Martinez	18	Sara Del Rey	01:48
21	Nikki Roxx	17	Sara Del Rey	00:46

After Sara Del Rey was eliminated, she remained at ringside and pulled Ariel over the top rope to eliminate her.

== Volume 20 ==
Shimmer Women Athletes Volume 20
- Promotion: Shimmer Women Athletes
- Date: July 05, 2008
- City: Berwyn, Illinois
- Venue: The Eagles Club

No.	Results	Stipulations	Times
1	Shark Girl defeated Veronika Vice	Singles match	7:03
2	The Canadian NINJAs (Nicole Matthews and Portia Perez) defeated Allison Danger and Jennifer Blake	Tag team match	10:56
3	Amazing Kong defeated Danyah	Singles match	4:33
4	Cat Power defeated Daffney by submission	Singles match	5:30
5	The International Home Wrecking Crew (Jetta and Rain) defeated Ashley Lane and Nevaeh	Tag team match	12:09
6	Ariel defeated Nikki Roxx	Singles match	11:01
7	Sara Del Rey defeated Serena Deeb by submission	Singles match	16:46
8	Cheerleader Melissa defeated LuFisto	Singles match	12:06
9	MsChif (c) defeated Mercedes Martinez	Singles match for the Shimmer Championship	17:05
(c) / – the champion(s) heading into the match

== Volume 21 ==
Shimmer Women Athletes Volume 21
- Promotion: Shimmer Women Athletes
- Date: October 19, 2008
- City: Berwyn, Illinois
- Venue: The Eagles Club

No.	Results	Stipulations	Times
1^{D}	Melanie Cruise defeated Cherry Bomb	Singles match	—
2^{D}	Rachel Summerlyn defeated Sassy Stephie	Singles match	—
3	Sara Del Rey defeated Serena Deeb	Singles match	9:36
4	Miss Natural defeated Lorelei Lee	Singles match	5:35
5	Daffney defeated Cat Power	Singles match	5:14
6	Nikki Roxx defeated Danyah	Singles match	6:03
7	Wesna Busic defeated Amber O'Neal	Singles match	7:21
8	Ashley Lane and Nevaeh defeated The Experience (Lexie Fyfe and Malia Hosaka), The International Home Wrecking Crew (Jetta and Rain), The Suicide Blondes (Jennifer Blake and LuFisto), The Canadian NINJAs (Nicole Matthews and Portia Perez) and The Pink Ladies (Jessie McKay and Madison Eagles)	Gauntlet match for the inaugural Shimmer Tag Team Championship	44:57
9	Ariel defeated Amazing Kong, Cheerleader Melissa and Mercedes Martinez	Four Corner Survival match	9:06
10	MsChif (c) defeated Daizee Haze	Singles match for the Shimmer Championship	18:58
(c) / – the champion(s) heading into the match; D / – this was a dark match

Tag team gauntlet match eliminations
Elimination #	Team eliminated	Eliminated by	Time
1	The Pink Ladies	The Canadian NINJAs	10:10
2	The Canadian NINJAs	The Suicide Blondes	18:53
3	The Suicide Blondes	The International Home Wrecking Crew	26:33
4	The International Home Wrecking Crew	Ashley Lane and Nevaeh	32:18
5	The Experience	Ashley Lane and Nevaeh	44:57

== Volume 22 ==
Shimmer Women Athletes Volume 22
- Promotion: Shimmer Women Athletes
- Date: October 19, 2008
- City: Berwyn, Illinois
- Venue: The Eagles Club

No.	Results	Stipulations	Times
1	Rain defeated Daffney	Singles match	11:11
2	Danyah defeated Cat Power	Singles match	4:37
3	Amazing Kong defeated Rachel Summerlyn	Singles match	5:59
4	The Experience (Lexie Fyfe and Malia Hosaka) defeated The Pink Ladies (Jessie McKay and Madison Eagles)	Tag team match	11:22
5	Mercedes Martinez defeated Amber O'Neal	Singles match	10:40
6	Cheerleader Melissa defeated Jennifer Blake	Singles match	9:06
7	Daizee Haze defeated Miss Natural	Singles match	5:56
8	Jetta defeated Nikki Roxx	Singles match	9:49
9	Ashley Lane and Nevaeh (c) defeated The Canadian NINJAs (Nicole Matthews and Portia Perez)	Tag team match for the Shimmer Tag Team Championship	9:36
10	LuFisto defeated Wesna Busic	Singles match	12:24
11	MsChif (c) defeated Ariel	Singles match for the Shimmer Championship	10:09
12	Serena Deeb defeated Sara Del Rey	Singles match	13:52
(c) / – the champion(s) heading into the match

== Volume 23 ==
Shimmer Women Athletes Volume 23
- Promotion: Shimmer Women Athletes
- Date: May 2, 2009
- City: Berwyn, Illinois
- Venue: The Eagles Club

No.	Results	Stipulations	Times
1^{D}	T.D. defeated Jeff Brooks	Singles match	—
2^{D}	Silas Young and Dan Lawrence defeated Jordan McIntyre and Knight Wagner	Tag team match	—
3^{D}	Rachel Summerlyn and Rayna von Tosh defeated Kimberly Kash and Sassy Stephie	Tag team match	—
4	Nikki Roxx defeated Cat Power	Singles match	7:55
5	Amber O'Neal defeated Tenille Tayla	Singles match	9:19
6	Daffney defeated Melanie Cruise	Singles match	4:02
7	Sara Del Rey defeated Madison Eagles	Singles match	10:23
8	LuFisto defeated Kellie Skater	Singles match	4:29
9	Nicole Matthews and Daizee Haze ended in a time limit draw	Singles match	20:00
10	Amazing Kong defeated Mercedes Martinez	Singles match	9:43
11	Ashley Lane and Nevaeh (c) defeated The International Home Wrecking Crew (Rain and Jetta) (with Lacey)	Two-out-of-three falls tag team match for the Shimmer Tag Team Championship	14:54
12	Wesna Busic defeated Cheerleader Melissa	Singles match	24:07
13	MsChif (c) defeated Serena Deeb	Singles match for the Shimmer Championship	12:11
(c) / – the champion(s) heading into the match; D / – this was a dark match

== Volume 24 ==
Shimmer Women Athletes Volume 24
- Promotion: Shimmer Women Athletes
- Date: May 2, 2009
- City: Berwyn, Illinois
- Venue: The Eagles Club

No.	Results	Stipulations	Times
1	Kellie Skater defeated Jessie McKay	Singles match	4:42
2	The Experience (Lexie Fyfe and Malia Hosaka) defeated Rayna Von Tash and Tenille Tayla	Tag team match	10:46
3	Jennifer Blake defeated Amber O'Neal	Singles match	8:44
4	Mercedes Martinez defeated Madison Eagles	Singles match	11:05
5	The International Home Wrecking Crew (Jetta and Rain) defeated Pretty Bitchin' (Ariel and Nikki Roxx)	Tag team match	12:03
6	Serena Deeb defeated Cat Power	Singles match	8:24
7	Daizee Haze defeated Nicole Matthews	No Time Limit Singles match	13:17
8	Portia Perez defeated Allison Danger	No Disqualification Street Fight	11:33
9	Wesna Busic (with Annie Social) defeated LuFisto	Singles match	12:51
10	Amazing Kong and Sara Del Rey defeated Cheerleader Melissa and MsChif	Tag team match to determine the #1 contenders for the Shimmer Tag Team Championship	21:46

== Volume 25 ==
Shimmer Women Athletes Volume 25
- Promotion: Shimmer Women Athletes
- Date: May 3, 2009
- City: Berwyn, Illinois
- Venue: The Eagles Club

No.	Results	Stipulations	Times
1^{D}	Kimberly Kash defeated Sassy Stephie	Singles match	—
2	Tenille Tayla defeated Jetta (with Lacey)	Singles match	6:56
3	Cat Power defeated Ariel, Kellie Skater and Rachel Summerlyn	Four Corner Survival match	7:01
4	Nikki Roxx defeated Melanie Cruise (with Annie Social)	Singles match	6:47
5	Rain (with Lacey) defeated Jennifer Blake	Singles match	10:10
6	Cheerleader Melissa defeated Jessie McKay	Singles match	8:57
7	LuFisto defeated Amber O'Neal by submission	Singles match	7:42
8	Allison Danger and Daizee Haze defeated The Canadian NINJAs (Nicole Matthews and Portia Perez)	Tag team match	10:19
9	Serena Deeb defeated Mercedes Martinez	Singles match	11:41
10	Ashley Lane and Nevaeh (c) defeated Amazing Kong and Sara Del Rey) by disqualification	Tag team match for the Shimmer Tag Team Championship	8:23
11	MsChif (c) defeated Wesna Busic (with Annie Social)	Singles match for the Shimmer Championship	14:15
(c) / – the champion(s) heading into the match; D / – this was a dark match

== Volume 26 ==
Shimmer Women Athletes Volume 26
- Promotion: Shimmer Women Athletes
- Date: May 3, 2009
- City: Berwyn, Illinois
- Venue: The Eagles Club

No.	Results	Stipulations	Times
1	Jetta (with Lacey) defeated Daffney	Singles match	7:08
2	Daizee Haze defeated Rayna Von Tash	Singles match	7:06
3	Jessie McKay defeated Jennifer Blake, Kellie Skater and Melanie Cruise (with Annie Social)	Four Corner Survival match	8:26
4	Pretty Bitchin' (Ariel and Nikki Roxx) defeated The Experience (Lexie Fyfe and Malia Hosaka)	Tag team match	8:47
5	Rain (with Lacey) defeated Tenille Tayla	Singles match	8:33
6	Amazing Kong and Sara Del Rey defeated Mercedes Martinez and Serena Deeb	Tag team match	11:04
7	Cheerleader Melissa defeated Wesna Busic (with Annie Social)	Knockout or Submission match	17:46
8	The Canadian NINJAs (Nicole Matthews and Portia Perez) defeated Ashley Lane and Nevaeh (c)	Tag team match for the Shimmer Tag Team Championship	7:48
9	MsChif (c) defeated LuFisto	Singles match for the Shimmer Championship	14:58
(c) / – the champion(s) heading into the match

== Volume 27 ==
Shimmer Women Athletes Volume 27
- Promotion: Shimmer Women Athletes
- Date: November 8, 2009
- City: Berwyn, Illinois
- Venue: The Eagles Club

No.	Results	Stipulations	Times
1^{D}	Knight Wagner defeated ??? and ???	Three-way match	—
2^{D}	Nicole Matthews defeated Skilled Death Artist #2	Singles match	—
3^{D}	Kacey Diamond and Sassy Stephie (with Mademoiselle Rachelle) defeated Kimberly Kash and Leva Bates	Tag team match	—
4	Malia Hosaka defeated Tenille Tayla	Singles match	10:57
5	Allison Danger defeated Kellie Skater	Singles match	8:18
6	The International Home Wrecking Crew (Jetta and Rain) (with Lacey) defeated Daffney and Rachel Summerlyn by submission	Tag team match	10:59
7	Cat Power defeated Ariel	Singles match with Daizee Haze as the special guest referee	10:40
8	Melanie Cruise and Wesna Busic defeated Ashley Lane and Nevaeh	Tag team match	11:01
9	Cheerleader Melissa defeated Nicole Matthews	Singles match	14:08
10	Sara Del Rey defeated Jessie McKay by submission	Singles match	12:30
11	Amazing Kong vs. LuFisto ended in a double countout	Singles match to determine the #1 contender for the Shimmer Championship with Daizee Haze as the special guest referee	7:18
12	Ayako Hamada defeated Mercedes Martinez	Singles match	15:11
13	MsChif (c) defeated Nikki Roxx	Singles match for the Shimmer Championship	12:29
(c) / – the champion(s) heading into the match; D / – this was a dark match

== Volume 28 ==
Shimmer Women Athletes Volume 28
- Promotion: Shimmer Women Athletes
- Date: November 8, 2009
- City: Berwyn, Illinois
- Venue: The Eagles Club

No.	Results	Stipulations	Times
1	Ariel defeated Malia Hosaka	Singles match	9:07
2	Melanie Cruise defeated Kimberly Kash	Singles match	1:59
3	Ashley Lane and Nevaeh defeated Kacey Diamond and Sassy Stephie (with Mademoiselle Rachelle)	Tag team match	9:05
4	Nikki Roxx defeated Wesna Busic	Singles match	10:21
5	Rachel Summerlyn defeated Daffney by disqualification	Singles match	0:50
6	The International Home Wrecking Crew (Jetta and Rain) (with Lacey) defeated Jessie McKay and Tenille Tayla	Tag team match	11:01
7	Cheerleader Melissa defeated Kellie Skater	Singles match	7:12
8	Mercedes Martinez defeated Cat Power	Singles match	10:59
9	Nicole Matthews defeated Allison Danger	Singles match	8:35
10	Ayako Hamada defeated Sara Del Rey by disqualification	Singles match	3:23
11	Sara Del Rey defeated Ayako Hamada	No Disqualification, No Count-Out match	12:03
12	MsChif (c) defeated Amazing Kong and LuFisto	Three-way elimination match for the Shimmer Championship	10:35
(c) / – the champion(s) heading into the match

Three-way match eliminations
Eliminated	Wrestler	Eliminated by	Method of elimination	Time
1	LuFisto	Amazing Kong	pinned after an Amazing Bomb	4:30
2	Amazing Kong	MsChif	pinned after a Desecrator	10:35
Winner	MsChif			10:35

== Volume 29 ==
Shimmer Women Athletes Volume 29
- Promotion: Shimmer Women Athletes
- Date: April 10, 2010
- City: Berwyn, Illinois
- Venue: The Eagles Club

No.	Results	Stipulations	Times
1^{D}	The Chan Clan (Jordan McEntyre and Knight Wagner) defeated Dillinger and Green Man	Tag team match	—
2^{D}	Anna Minouska defeated P.J. Tyler	Singles match	—
3^{D}	Leva Bates defeated She Nay Nay	Singles match	—
4	Kellie Skater defeated Nevaeh	Singles match	6:23
5	Pretty Bitchin' (Ariel and Nikki Roxx) defeated Annie Social and Melanie Cruise	Tag team match	9:20
6	LuFisto defeated Rachel Summerlyn by submission	Singles match	3:54
7	Mercedes Martinez defeated Jamilia Craft	Singles match	6:36
8	Allison Danger defeated Rayna Von Tash	Singles match	6:52
9	Madison Eagles defeated Sassy Stephie	Singles match	6:19
10	Jessie McKay defeated Cat Power	Singles match	8:15
11	Sara Del Rey defeated Tenille Tayla	Singles match	11:11
12	Misaki Ohata defeated Daizee Haze	Singles match	10:28
13	Ayumi Kurihara defeated Tomoka Nakagawa	Singles match	14:19
14	The Canadian NINJAs (Nicole Matthews and Portia Perez) (c) defeated Cheerleader Melissa and MsChif	Tag team match for the Shimmer Tag Team Championship	16:24
(c) / – the champion(s) heading into the match; D / – this was a dark match

== Volume 30 ==
Shimmer Women Athletes Volume 30
- Promotion: Shimmer Women Athletes
- Date: April 10, 2010
- City: Berwyn, Illinois
- Venue: The Eagles Club

No.	Results	Stipulations	Times
1	Malia Hosaka defeated Leva Bates	Singles match	7:15
2	Annie Social and Melanie Cruise defeated Rachel and Jessica's Excellent Tag Team (Jessica James and Rachel Summerlyn)	Tag team match	8:19
3	LuFisto defeated Cat Power	Singles match	8:08
4	Mercedes Martinez defeated Kellie Skater	Singles match	8:15
5	Ayumi Kurihara defeated Nikki Roxx	Singles match	10:51
6	Daizee Haze and Tomoka Nakagawa defeated Jamilia Craft and Misaki Ohata	Tag team match	8:29
7	Nicole Matthews defeated Jessie McKay	Singles match	11:21
8	Sara Del Rey defeated Hiroyo Matsumoto	Singles match	8:45
9	Allison Danger defeated Portia Perez	Last Woman Standing match	14:57
10	Madison Eagles defeated Cheerleader Melissa	Singles match to determine the #1 contender for the Shimmer Championship	13:27
11	MsChif (c) defeated Sarah Stock	Singles match for the Shimmer Championship	9:25
(c) / – the champion(s) heading into the match

== Volume 31 ==
Shimmer Women Athletes Volume 31
- Promotion: Shimmer Women Athletes
- Date: April 11, 2010
- City: Berwyn, Illinois
- Venue: The Eagles Club

No.	Results	Stipulations	Times
1^{D}	Knight Wagner defeated Ninja #46	Singles match	—
2^{D}	Leva Bates and P.J. Tyler defeated Anna Minouska and She Nay Nay	Tag team match	—
3	Kellie Skater defeated Jessica James	Singles match	4:52
4	Jessie McKay defeated Sassy Stephie	Singles match	6:45
5	Malia Hosaka defeated Rayna Von Tash	Singles match	6:13
6	Mercedes Martinez defeated Tomoka Nakagawa	Singles match	8:57
7	Melanie Cruise (with Annie Social) defeated Allison Danger	Singles match	4:52
8	Daffney defeated Rachel Summerlyn	No Disqualification match	4:57
9	Hiroyo Matsumoto defeated LuFisto	Singles match	7:40
10	Cheerleader Melissa defeated Misaki Ohata	Singles match	9:47
11	The Canadian NINJAs (Nicole Matthews and Portia Perez) (c) defeated Pretty Bitchin' (Ariel and Nikki Roxx)	Tag team match for the Shimmer Tag Team Championship	8:25
12	Ayako Hamada defeated Daizee Haze	Singles match	10:36
13	Ayumi Kurihara defeated Sara Del Rey	Singles match	17:01
14	Madison Eagles defeated MsChif (c)	Singles match for the Shimmer Championship	11:59
(c) / – the champion(s) heading into the match; D / – this was a dark match

== Volume 32 ==
Shimmer Women Athletes Volume 32
- Promotion: Shimmer Women Athletes
- Date: April 11, 2010
- City: Berwyn, Illinois
- Venue: The Eagles Club

No.	Results	Stipulations	Times
1	Jamilia Craft defeated Malia Hosaka	Singles match	7:13
2	Rachel Summerlyn defeated Kellie Skater by submission	Singles match	6:29
3	Cat Power defeated Nevaeh	Singles match	6:23
4	Allison Danger and Jennifer Blake defeated Annie Social and Melanie Cruise	Tag team match	10:29
5	Tomoka Nakagawa defeated Jessie McKay	Singles match	9:08
6	Portia Perez defeated Tenille Tayla	Singles match	9:49
7	Sara Del Rey defeated Misaki Ohata	Singles match	10:47
8	MsChif defeated Daffney	Singles match	8:57
9	Sarah Stock defeated Nicole Matthews	Singles match	12:31
10	Daizee Haze defeated Ayumi Kurihara by countout	Singles match	9:19
11	Mercedes Martinez defeated Hiroyo Matsumoto	Singles match	12:26
12	Cheerleader Melissa defeated Ayako Hamada	Singles match	19:38

== Volume 33 ==
Shimmer Women Athletes Volume 33
- Promotion: Shimmer Women Athletes
- Date: September 11, 2010
- City: Berwyn, Illinois
- Venue: The Eagles Club

No.	Results	Stipulations	Times
1^{D}	Mia Yim and Taylor Made defeated Maja Svensson and Mena Libra	Tag team match	6:08
2	Rachel and Jessica's Excellent Tag Team (Jessica James and Rachel Summerlyn) defeated Athena and Bonesaw	Tag team match	8:14
3	Cat Power defeated Jamilia Craft	Singles match	7:24
4	Allison Danger defeated Leva Bates	Singles match	10:37
5	Melanie Cruise defeated Taylor Made	Singles match	6:47
6	Misaki Ohata defeated Ariel by submission	Singles match	7:00
7	Serena Deeb defeated Kellie Skater	Singles match	8:06
8	Sara Del Rey defeated Nevaeh by submission	Singles match	5:07
9	Jessie McKay defeated Nicole Matthews	Singles match	14:17
10	Ayumi Kurihara defeated Daizee Haze	No Countout match	9:11
11	Ayako Hamada defeated Tomoka Nakagawa	Singles match	12:22
12	Madison Eagles (c) defeated Cheerleader Melissa	Singles match for the Shimmer Championship	16:55
(c) / – the champion(s) heading into the match; D / – this was a dark match

== Volume 34 ==
Shimmer Women Athletes Volume 34
- Promotion: Shimmer Women Athletes
- Date: September 11, 2010
- City: Berwyn, Illinois
- Venue: The Eagles Club

No.	Results	Stipulations	Times
1	Kellie Skater defeated Jamilia Craft	Singles match	6:40
2	Melanie Cruise defeated Leva Bates	Singles match	5:28
3	Nikki Roxx defeated Misaki Ohata	Singles match	7:35
4	Daffney defeated Nevaeh	Singles match	4:57
5	Veronika Vice defeated Allison Danger	Singles match	9:19
6	Tenille Tayla defeated Daizee Haze	Singles match	—
7	The Canadian NINJAs (Nicole Matthews and Portia Perez) (c) defeated Rachel and Jessica's Excellent Tag Team (Jessica James and Rachel Summerlyn)	Tag team match for the Shimmer Tag Team Championship	9:34
8	Cheerleader Melissa defeated Tomoka Nakagawa	Singles match	12:54
9	Tenille defeated Athena by submission	Singles match	7:20
10	Jessie McKay defeated Ayako Hamada and Sara Del Rey	Three-way match	10:22
11	Madison Eagles (c) defeated Ayumi Kurihara	Singles match for the Shimmer Championship	16:11
(c) / – the champion(s) heading into the match

== Volume 35 ==
Shimmer Women Athletes Volume 35
- Promotion: Shimmer Women Athletes
- Date: September 12, 2010
- City: Berwyn, Illinois
- Venue: The Eagles Club

No.	Results	Stipulations	Times
1^{D}	Maja Svensson defeated Mia Yim	Singles match	—
2	Melanie Cruise defeated Jessica James	Singles match	5:53
3	Mercedes Martinez defeated Misaki Ohata	Singles match	7:47
4	Daizee Haze and Tomoka Nakagawa defeated Pretty Bitchin' (Ariel and Nikki Roxx)	Tag team match	16:51
5	Allison Danger defeated Veronika Vice	Singles match	8:57
6	Portia Perez defeated Serena Deeb by submission	Singles match	12:43
7	Amazing Kong defeated Kellie Skater	Singles match	5:57
8	Sara Del Rey defeated Rachel Summerlyn	Singles match	9:11
9	Ayako Hamada defeated Nicole Matthews	Singles match	10:49
10	Ayumi Kurihara defeated Cheerleader Melissa	Singles match	11:25
11	Madison Eagles (c) defeated Jessie McKay	Singles match for the Shimmer Championship	19:59
(c) / – the champion(s) heading into the match; D / – this was a dark match

== Volume 36 ==
Shimmer Women Athletes Volume 36
- Promotion: Shimmer Women Athletes
- Date: September 12, 2010
- City: Berwyn, Illinois
- Venue: The Eagles Club

No.	Results	Stipulations	Times
1	Mercedes Martinez defeated Nikki Roxx	Singles match	9:15
2	Jamilia Craft defeated Bonesaw	Singles match	4:26
3	Mena Libra defeated Taylor Made	Singles match	—
4	Leva Bates defeated Cat Power	Singles match	7:17
5	Veronika Vice defeated Jessica James	Singles match	6:27
6	Misaki Ohata defeated Kellie Skater by submission	Singles match	8:53
7	Nevaeh defeated Athena	Singles match	5:15
8	The Canadian NINJAs (Nicole Matthews and Portia Perez) (c) defeated Jessie McKay and Tenille Tayla	Tag team match for the Shimmer Tag Team Championship	11:43
9	Rachel Summerlyn defeated Daffney	"I Quit" match	12:36
10	Ayako Hamada, Ayumi Kurihara, Cheerleader Melissa and Serena Deeb defeated Daizee Haze, Sara Del Rey, Madison Eagles and Tomoka Nakagawa	Eight-woman elimination tag team match	17:30
(c) / – the champion(s) heading into the match

Four-on four tag team match eliminations
Elimination	Wrestler	Team	Eliminated by	Elimination move	Time
1	Tomoka Nakagawa	Team #2	Serena Deeb	Pinfall	12:34
2	Daizee Haze and Serena Deeb	Team #1 and Team #2	Each other	Pinfall	13:13
3	Ayumi Kurihara	Team #1	Sara Del Ray	Pinfall	14:07
4	Sara Del Ray	Team #2	Ayako Hamada	Pinfall	15:56
5	Madison Eagles	Team #2	Cheerleader Melissa	Pinfall	17:30
Winner(s):	Ayako Hamada and Cheerleader Melissa (Team #1)				

== Volume 37 ==
Shimmer Women Athletes Volume 37
- Promotion: Shimmer Women Athletes
- Date: March 26, 2011
- City: Berwyn, Illinois
- Venue: The Eagles Club

No.	Results	Stipulations	Times
1^{D}	Bonesaw defeated Jett Riley	Singles match	—
2^{D}	Brittany Force defeated Rhia O'Reilly	Singles match	—
3	MsChif defeated Kellie Skater	Singles match	7:28
4	Mena Libra defeated Courtney Rush	Singles match	5:28
5	LuFisto defeated Tomoka Nakagawa	Singles match	8:57
6	Regeneration X (Allison Danger and Leva Bates) defeated Jamilia Craft and Mia Yim	Tag team match	6:03
7	Christina Von Eerie defeated Sara Del Rey by countout	Singles match	4:04
8	Cheerleader Melissa defeated Athena	Singles match	8:14
9	The Knight Dynasty (Britani Knight and Saraya Knight) (with Rebecca Knox) defeated Pretty Bitchin' (Ariel and Nikki Roxx) by disqualification	Tag team match	13:14
10	Serena Deeb defeated Daizee Haze	Singles match	14:22
11	Ayako Hamada defeated Jessie McKay	Singles match	8:12
12	Seven Star Sisters (Hiroyo Matsumoto and Misaki Ohata) defeated The Canadian NINJAs (Nicole Matthews and Portia Perez) (c)	Tag team match for the Shimmer Tag Team Championship	13:26
13	Madison Eagles (c) defeated Mercedes Martinez	Singles match for the Shimmer Championship	15:29
(c) / – the champion(s) heading into the match; D / – this was a dark match

== Volume 38 ==
Shimmer Women Athletes Volume 38
- Promotion: Shimmer Women Athletes
- Date: March 26, 2011
- City: Berwyn, Illinois
- Venue: The Eagles Club

No.	Results	Stipulations	Times
1	Daizee Haze defeated Courtney Rush	Singles match	7:26
2	Tomoka Nakagawa defeated Jessica James	Singles match	8:46
3	Pretty Bitchin' (Ariel and Nikki Roxx) defeated Regeneration X (Allison Danger and Leva Bates)	Tag team match	7:15
4	Sara Del Rey defeated Christina Von Eerie	Singles match	8:43
5	Cheerleader Melissa defeated Melanie Cruise	Singles match	9:54
6	Jessie McKay and Serena Deeb defeated The Canadian NINJAs (Nicole Matthews and Portia Perez)	Tag team match	8:38
7	Mercedes Martinez defeated Rachel Summerlyn	Singles match	9:47
8	Madison Eagles (c) defeated MsChif	Singles match for the Shimmer Championship	9:20
9	Seven Star Sisters (Hiroyo Matsumoto and Misaki Ohata) (c) defeated The Knight Dynasty (Britani Knight and Saraya Knight) (with Rebecca Knox)	Tag team match for the Shimmer Tag Team Championship	12:03
10	Ayako Hamada defeated Ayumi Kurihara	Singles match	16:35
(c) / – the champion(s) heading into the match

== Volume 39 ==
Shimmer Women Athletes Volume 39
- Promotion: Shimmer Women Athletes
- Date: March 27, 2011
- City: Berwyn, Illinois
- Venue: The Eagles Club

No.	Results	Stipulations	Times
1^{D}	Jett Riley and Rhia O'Reilly defeated Brittany Force and December	Tag team match	—
2	Kellie Skater defeated Courtney Rush	Singles match	5:41
3	LuFisto defeated Sassy Stephie (with Madamoiselle Rachelle)	Singles match	7:57
4	Rachel Summerlyn defeated Mena Libra	Singles match	4:07
5	Seven Star Sisters (Hiroyo Matsumoto and Misaki Ohata) (c) defeated Pretty Bitchin' (Ariel and Nikki Roxx)	Tag team match for the Shimmer Tag Team Championship	12:49
6	Mercedes Martinez defeated Britani Knight (with Rebecca Knox)	Singles match	8:40
7	Daizee Haze and Tomoka Nakagawa defeated Jamilia Craft and Mia Yim	Tag team match	7:00
8	Jessica James defeated Athena	Singles match	8:19
9	MsChif defeated Saraya Knight (with Rebecca Knox)	Singles match	7:17
10	Serena Deeb defeated Portia Perez by disqualification	Singles match	9:54
11	Nicole Matthews defeated Jessie McKay 2–1	Two-out-of-three falls match	21:54
12	Ayako Hamada and Cheerleader Melissa defeated Madison Eagles and Sara Del Rey	Tag team match	20:04
(c) / – the champion(s) heading into the match; D / – this was a dark match

== Volume 40 ==
Shimmer Women Athletes Volume 40
- Promotion: Shimmer Women Athletes
- Date: March 27, 2011
- City: Berwyn, Illinois
- Venue: The Eagles Club

No.	Results	Stipulations	Times
1	Kellie Skater defeated Taylor Made	Singles match	6:18
2	Rachel Summerlyn defeated Bonesaw	Singles match	—
3	Mercedes Martinez defeated Christina Von Eerie	Singles match	7:57
4	MsChif defeated Melanie Cruise	Singles match	8:01
5	Jessie McKay defeated Athena	Singles match	11:51
6	The Knight Dynasty (Britani Knight and Saraya Knight) (with Rebecca Knox) defeated Regeneration X (Allison Danger and Leva Bates)	Tag team match	11:24
7	Sara Del Rey defeated Jessica James	Singles match	10:10
8	Serena Deeb defeated Cheerleader Melissa, LuFisto and Portia Perez	Four Corner Survival match	21:46
9	Ayumi Kurihara defeated Nicole Matthews	Singles match	8:24
10	Daizee Haze and Tomoka Nakagawa defeated Seven Star Sisters (Hiroyo Matsumoto and Misaki Ohata) (c)	Tag team match for the Shimmer Tag Team Championship	14:58
11	Madison Eagles (c) defeated Ayako Hamada	Singles match for the Shimmer Championship	10:40
(c) / – the champion(s) heading into the match

== Volume 41 ==
Shimmer Women Athletes Volume 41
- Promotion: Shimmer Women Athletes
- Date: October 1, 2011
- City: Berwyn, Illinois
- Venue: The Eagles Club

No.	Results	Stipulations	Times
1^{D}	Bonesaw, Buggy Nova and She Nay Nay defeated Kimberly Maddox, Su Yung and Veda Scott	Six-woman tag team match	8:24
2^{D}	Allysin Kay and Maja Svensson vs. Cherry Bomb and K. C. Spinelli ended in a time limit draw	Tag team match	10:00
3	Nikki Roxx defeated Kellie Skater	Singles match	7:30
4	Mercedes Martinez defeated Davina Rose	Singles match	6:30
5	Hailey Hatred defeated Kalamity	Singles match	7:28
6	Sara Del Rey defeated Yumi Ohka	Singles match	11:17
7	Kana defeated Mia Yim by submission	Singles match	5:47
8	Ayumi Kurihara and Ayako Hamada defeated Daizee Haze and Tomoka Nakagawa (c)	Tag team match for the Shimmer Tag Team Championship	11:36
9	Nevaeh defeated Ashley Lane	Singles match	7:18
10	Cheerleader Melissa defeated Britani Knight	Singles match	6:38
11	Portia Perez defeated Jessie McKay	Singles match	7:48
12	Saraya Knight (with Britani Knight) defeated Allison Danger (with Leva Bates)	British Rounds match	12:18
13	Hiroyo Matsumoto defeated Nicole Matthews	Singles match	11:41
14	Madison Eagles (c) defeated Serena Deeb	Singles match for the Shimmer Championship	16:39
(c) / – the champion(s) heading into the match; D / – this was a dark match

== Volume 42 ==
Shimmer Women Athletes Volume 42
- Promotion: Shimmer Women Athletes
- Date: October 1, 2011
- City: Berwyn, Illinois
- Venue: The Eagles Club

No.	Results	Stipulations	Times
1	Mercedes Martinez defeated Leva Bates	Singles match	5:59
2	Melanie Cruise and Mena Libra defeated Hailey Hatred and Kalamity	Tag team match	7:08
3	Tomoka Nakagawa defeated Kellie Skater, LuFisto and MsChif	Four-way match	5:22
4	Yumi Ohka defeated Courtney Rush	Singles match	7:08
5	Portia Perez defeated Davina Rose by submission	Singles match	6:06
6	Nevaeh and Sassy Stephie defeated Pretty Bitchin' (Ariel and Nikki Roxx)	Tag team match	5:59
7	Cheerleader Melissa defeated Christina Von Eerie	Singles match	9:24
8	Athena defeated Jessie McKay and Mia Yim	Three-way match	4:56
9	Nicole Matthews defeated Serena Deeb	Singles match	14:18
10	Ayako Hamada and Ayumi Kurihara (c) defeated The Knight Dynasty (Britani Knight and Saraya Knight)	Tag team match for the Shimmer Tag Team Championship	7:55
11	Kana defeated Sara Del Rey by technical submission	Singles match	14:01
12	Madison Eagles (c) defeated Hiroyo Matsumoto	Singles match for the Shimmer Championship	12:53
(c) / – the champion(s) heading into the match

== Volume 43 ==
Shimmer Women Athletes Volume 43
- Promotion: Shimmer Women Athletes
- Date: October 2, 2011
- City: Berwyn, Illinois
- Venue: The Eagles Club

No.	Results	Stipulations	Times
1^{D}	El Tigre Gordo and The Awesome Threesome (Jordan McEntyre and Knight Wagner) (with Eryn) defeated The CLASH (Austin Manix, Cameron Skyy and Tommy Treznik)	Six-man tag team match	—
2^{D}	Jett Riley and Kimberly Maddox defeated Buggy Nova and December	Tag team match	—
3^{D}	K. C. Spinelli defeated Su Yung	Singles match	—
4	LuFisto defeated Maja Svensson	Singles match	5:21
5	Regeneration-X (Allison Danger and Leva Bates) defeated Nevaeh and Sassy Stephie	Tag team match	7:55
6	Nicole Matthews defeated Davina Rose	Singles match	7:09
7	Hiroyo Matsumoto defeated Kellie Skater	Singles match	8:22
8	Saraya Knight defeated Ariel	Singles match	7:00
9	Courtney Rush defeated Nikki Roxx	Singles match	7:54
10	Yumi Ohka defeated Mia Yim	Singles match	8:31
11	MsChif defeated Tomoka Nakagawa	Singles match	7:18
12	Athena vs. Mercedes Martinez ended in a double countout	Singles match	6:05
13	Jessie McKay defeated Britani Knight	Singles match	7:40
14	Serena Deeb defeated Portia Perez	No Holds Barred match	12:08
15	Cheerleader Melissa defeated Kana	Singles match to determine the #1 contender for the Shimmer Championship	12:57
16	Ayako Hamada and Ayumi Kurihara (c) defeated Madison Eagles and Sara Del Rey	Tag team match for the Shimmer Tag Team Championship	18:13
(c) / – the champion(s) heading into the match; D / – this was a dark match

== Volume 44 ==
Shimmer Women Athletes Volume 44
- Promotion: Shimmer Women Athletes
- Date: October 2, 2011
- City: Berwyn, Illinois
- Venue: The Eagles Club

No.	Results	Stipulations	Times
1	Kellie Skater defeated Davina Rose	Singles match	5:37
2	Taylor Made defeated Veda Scott	Singles match	3:31
3	Kalamity defeated Tomoka Nakagawa	Singles match	5:23
4	Nevaeh and Sassy Stephie defeated Ashley Lane and Mia Yim	Tag team match	6:36
5	Serena Deeb defeated Yumi Ohka	Singles match	10:46
6	Christina Von Eerie, MsChif and Regeneration X (Allison Danger and Leva Bates) defeated Bonesaw, Melanie Cruise, Mena Libra and She Nay Nay	Eight-woman tag team match	10:04
7	Hiroyo Matsumoto defeated Jessie McKay	Singles match	6:07
8	Sara Del Rey defeated Courtney Rush	Singles match	10:30
9	Athena defeated Mercedes Martinez by disqualification	Singles match	6:45
10	Kana defeated LuFisto by technical submission	Singles match	9:17
11	Britani Knight defeated Saraya Knight	No Disqualification match	14:01
12	Ayako Hamada and Ayumi Kurihara (c) defeated The Canadian NINJAs (Nicole Matthews and Portia Perez)	Tag team match for the Shimmer Tag Team Championship	8:54
13	Cheerleader Melissa defeated Madison Eagles (c)	Singles match for the Shimmer Championship	18:26
(c) / – the champion(s) heading into the match

== Volume 45 ==
Shimmer Women Athletes Volume 45
- Promotion: Shimmer Women Athletes
- Date: March 17, 2012
- City: Berwyn, Illinois
- Venue: The Eagles Club

No.	Results	Stipulations	Times
1^{D}	The Awesome Threesome (Jordan McEntyre and Knight Wagner) defeated Markus Crane and Tommy Treznik	Tag team match	—
2^{D}	December defeated Angelus Layne	Singles match	—
3	Courtney Rush defeated Rhia O'Reilly	Singles match	8:40
4	Melanie Cruise and Mena Libra defeated Shazza McKenzie and Veda Scott	Tag team match	7:07
5	Sara Del Rey defeated Leon	Singles match	9:02
6	Saraya Knight defeated Davina Rose by submission	Singles match	6:27
7	Jessie McKay defeated Mia Yim	Singles match	8:41
8	Ray defeated Kellie Skater	Singles match	12:12
9	Hailey Hatred and Kalamity defeated Kana and LuFisto	Tag team match	10:28
10	Portia Perez defeated Christina Von Eerie	Singles match	8:34
11	Ayako Hamada and Ayumi Kurihara (c) defeated Regeneration X (Allison Danger and Leva Bates)	Tag team match for the Shimmer Tag Team Championship	12:11
12	Athena defeated Mercedes Martinez	Singles match	13:46
13	Cheerleader Melissa (c) defeated Nicole Matthews	Singles match for the Shimmer Championship	16:00
(c) / – the champion(s) heading into the match; D / – this was a dark match

== Volume 46 ==
Shimmer Women Athletes Volume 46
- Promotion: Shimmer Women Athletes
- Date: March 17, 2012
- City: Berwyn, Illinois
- Venue: The Eagles Club

No.	Results	Stipulations	Times
1	Courtney Rush defeated Sassy Stephie	Singles match	8:07
2	Veda Scott defeated Saraya Knight by disqualification	Singles match	6:39
3	LuFisto defeated New York Knockout	Singles match	7:58
4	Sara Del Rey defeated Leva Bates	Singles match	6:22
5	Leon and Ray defeated Davina Rose and Mia Yim	Tag team match	13:38
6	Kellie Skater defeated K. C. Spinelli	Singles match	7:53
7	Jessie McKay defeated MsChif	Singles match	6:59
8	Nicole Matthews defeated Athena	Singles match	15:48
9	Mercedes Martinez defeated Kana	Singles match	11:23
10	Ayako Hamada and Ayumi Kurihara (c) defeated Hailey Hatred and Kalamity	Tag team match for the Shimmer Tag Team Championship	12:10
11	Cheerleader Melissa (c) defeated Portia Perez	Singles match for the Shimmer Championship	11:24
(c) / – the champion(s) heading into the match

== Volume 47 ==
Shimmer Women Athletes Volume 47
- Promotion: Shimmer Women Athletes
- Date: March 18, 2012
- City: Berwyn, Illinois
- Venue: The Eagles Club

No.	Results	Stipulations	Times
1^{D}	Nikki St. John defeated Angelus Layne	Singles match	—
2	Rhia O'Reilly defeated Taylor Made	Singles match	4:32
3	Kellie Skater defeated Veda Scott	Singles match	7:08
4	Kalamity defeated K. C. Spinelli	Singles match	6:17
5	Kana and LuFisto defeated MsEerie (Christina Von Eerie and MsChif)	Tag team match	8:16
6	Athena defeated Sassy Stephie	Singles match	6:42
7	The Canadian NINJAs (Nicole Matthews and Portia Perez) defeated Davina Rose and Mia Yim	Tag team match	9:31
8	Shazza McKenzie defeated Saraya Knight by disqualification	Singles match	5:36
9	Queens of Winning (Courtney Rush and Sara Del Rey) defeated Regeneration X (Allison Danger and Leva Bates)	Tag team match	10:22
10	Mercedes Martinez defeated Hailey Hatred	Singles match	15:15
11	Ayako Hamada and Ayumi Kurihara (c) defeated Leon and Ray	Tag team match for the Shimmer Tag Team Championship	14:33
12	Cheerleader Melissa (c) defeated Jessie McKay	Singles match for the Shimmer Championship	14:33
(c) / – the champion(s) heading into the match; D / – this was a dark match

== Volume 48 ==
Shimmer Women Athletes Volume 48
- Promotion: Shimmer Women Athletes
- Date: March 18, 2012
- City: Berwyn, Illinois
- Venue: The Eagles Club

No.	Results	Stipulations	Times
1	K. C. Spinelli defeated New York Knockout	Singles match	6:06
2	Davina Rose and Mia Yim defeated Melanie Cruise and Mena Libra	Tag team match	5:23
3	Shazza McKenzie defeated Rhia O'Reilly	Singles match	5:55
4	Kana defeated Kellie Skater by submission	Singles match	6:57
5	Leon defeated LuFisto	Singles match	8:28
6	MsEerie (Christina Von Eerie and MsChif) defeated Hailey Hatred and Kalamity	Tag team match	11:42
7	Athena defeated Ray	Singles match	16:58
8	Queens of Winning (Courtney Rush and Sara Del Rey) defeated The Canadian NINJAs (Nicole Matthews and Portia Perez), Ayako Hamada and Ayumi Kurihara (c) and Regeneration X (Allison Danger and Leva Bates)	Four-way elimination tag team match for the Shimmer Tag Team Championship	24:49
9	Saraya Knight defeated Cheerleader Melissa (c)	Singles match for the Shimmer Championship	14:56
(c) / – the champion(s) heading into the match

Four-way tag team match eliminations
Elimination	Wrestler	Team	Eliminated by	Elimination move	Time
1	Leva Bates	Team #3	Portia Perez	Pinfall	N/A
2	Ayumi Kurihara	Team #4	Sara Del Ray	Pinfall	N/A
3	Portia Perez	Team #2	Courtney Rush	Pinfall	N/A
Winner(s):	Sara Del Ray and Courtney Rush (Team #1)				

== Volume 49 ==
Shimmer Women Athletes Volume 49
- Promotion: Shimmer Women Athletes
- Date: October 27, 2012
- City: Berwyn, Illinois
- Venue: The Eagles Club

No.	Results	Stipulations	Times
1^{D}	Knight Wagner, Marcus Crane and Sweet Ninja defeated The Yukon Moondogs and ???	Six-man tag team match	—
2^{D}	Angelus Layne defeated Sweet Cherie	Singles match	—
3^{D}	Pink Flash Kira and Thunderkitty defeated Angie Skye and Nikki St. John	Tag team match	—
4	Miss Natural defeated K. C. Spinelli	Singles match	6:22
5	Yumi Ohka defeated Christina Von Eerie	Singles match	7:15
6	Made in Sin (Allysin Kay and Taylor Made) defeated Shazza McKenzie and Veda Scott	Tag team match	7:35
7	Hiroyo Matsumoto defeated Sassy Stephie (with Mademoiselle Rachelle)	Singles match	9:05
8	Ryo Mizunami defeated Courtney Rush	Singles match	9:33
9	Cheerleader Melissa defeated Rhia O'Reilly	Singles match	9:11
10	Tomoka Nakagawa defeated Davina Rose	Singles match	8:14
11	Kellie Skater defeated Leva Bates	Singles match	11:49
12	Mercedes Martinez defeated MsChif	Singles match	9:44
13	Ayako Hamada defeated Kalamity	Singles match	11:35
14	The Canadian NINJAs (Nicole Matthews and Portia Perez) (c) defeated Kana and LuFisto	Tag team match for the Shimmer Tag Team Championship	16:37
15	Saraya Knight (c) defeated Athena	Singles match for the Shimmer Championship	19:14
(c) / – the champion(s) heading into the match; D / – this was a dark match

== Volume 50 ==
Shimmer Women Athletes Volume 50
- Promotion: Shimmer Women Athletes
- Date: October 27, 2012
- City: Berwyn, Illinois
- Venue: The Eagles Club

No.	Results	Stipulations	Times
1	Miss Natural defeated Veda Scott	Singles match	6:52
2	Shazza McKenzie defeated Santana Garrett	Singles match	4:44
3	Sassy Stephie (with Mademoiselle Rachelle) defeated Su Yung	Singles match	6:39
4	Courtney Rush defeated Taylor Made	Singles match	9:02
5	Christina Von Eerie defeated Cherry Bomb, Kalamity and Ryo Mizunami	Four-way match	8:52
6	Rhia O'Reilly defeated Davina Rose	Singles match	7:59
7	Hiroyo Matsumoto defeated Melanie Cruise	Singles match	9:35
8	Athena defeated Tomoka Nakagawa	Singles match	10:11
9	Kellie Skater defeated Yumi Ohka	Singles match	10:19
10	Ayako Hamada defeated Kana	Singles match	14:16
11	Allison Danger, Cheerleader Melissa, Leva Bates, LuFisto and MsChif defeated Lexie Fyfe, Mercedes Martinez, Nicole Matthews, Portia Perez and Saraya Knight	Ten-woman elimination tag team match	29:44

Ten-woman tag team match eliminations
Elimination	Wrestler	Team	Eliminated by	Elimination move	Time
1	Nicole Matthews	Team #2	Allison Danger	Pinfall	N/A
2	Allison Danger	Team #1	Portia Perez	Pinfall	N/A
3	Leva Bates	Team #1	Lexie Fyfe	Pinfall	N/A
4	Lexie Fyfe	Team #2	LuFisto	Pinfall	N/A
5	LuFisto	Team #1	Portia Perez	Pinfall	N/A
6	Portia Perez	Team #2	MsChif	Pinfall	N/A
7	Mercedes Martinez	Team #2	MsChif	Pinfall	N/A
8	Sweet Saraya	Team #2	Cheerleader Melissa	Pinfall	N/A
Winner(s):	MsChif and Cheerleader Melissa (Team #1)				

== Volume 51 ==
Shimmer Women Athletes Volume 51
- Promotion: Shimmer Women Athletes
- Date: October 28, 2012
- City: Berwyn, Illinois
- Venue: The Eagles Club

No.	Results	Stipulations	Times
1^{D}	Marcus Crane and Tripp Cassidy defeated Dickey Bronson and El Tigre Gordo	Tag team match	—
2^{D}	Pink Flash Kira and Sweet Cherie defeated December and Heidi Lovelace	Tag team match	—
3^{D}	Angie Skye defeated Thunderkitty	Singles match	—
4	Melanie Cruise defeated Santana Garrett	Singles match	5:54
5	Davina Rose defeated Cherry Bomb	Singles match	7:49
6	Tomoka Nakagawa defeated Veda Scott	Singles match	7:40
7	Regeneration X (Allison Danger and Leva Bates) defeated Made in Sin (Allysin Kay and Taylor Made)	Tag team match	13:19
8	Rhia O'Reilly defeated K. C. Spinelli	Singles match	7:04
9	LuFisto defeated Ryo Mizunami	Singles match	9:17
10	Cheerleader Melissa defeated Miss Natural	Singles match	7:37
11	Ayako Hamada defeated Portia Perez	Singles match	9:37
12	Courtney Rush defeated Mercedes Martinez	Singles match	11:52
13	Yumi Ohka defeated Nicole Matthews	Singles match	14:57
14	Kana defeated Athena	Singles match	11:59
15	Saraya Knight (c) defeated Hiroyo Matsumoto, Kellie Skater and MsChif	Four-way elimination match for the Shimmer Championship	24:00
(c) / – the champion(s) heading into the match; D / – this was a dark match

Four-way match eliminations
Elimination #	Wrestler	Eliminated by	Elimination move	Time
1	MsChif	Hiroyo Matsumoto	Pinfall	N/A
2	Hiroyo Matsumoto	Kellie Skater	Pinfall	N/A
3	Kellie Skater	Saraya Knight	Pinfall	N/A

== Volume 52 ==
Shimmer Women Athletes Volume 52
- Promotion: Shimmer Women Athletes
- Date: October 28, 2012
- City: Berwyn, Illinois
- Venue: The Eagles Club

No.	Results	Stipulations	Times
1	K. C. Spinelli defeated Angelus Layne	Singles match	4:04
2	Miss Natural defeated Su Yung	Singles match	6:41
3	Davina Rose defeated Rhia O'Reilly	Singles match	8:20
4	Kana and LuFisto defeated Made in Sin (Allysin Kay and Taylor Made)	Tag team match	9:25
5	Kalamity defeated Sassy Stephie (with Mademoiselle Rachelle)	Singles match	9:01
6	Mercedes Martinez defeated Shazza McKenzie	Singles match	5:47
7	Global Green Gangsters (Kellie Skater and Tomoka Nakagawa) defeated MsEerie (Christina Von Eerie and MsChif)	Tag team match	8:21
8	Yumi Ohka defeated Ryo Mizunami	Singles match	10:48
9	Hiroyo Matsumoto defeated Courtney Rush	Singles match	11:00
10	The Canadian NINJAs (Nicole Matthews and Portia Perez) (c) defeated Regeneration X (Allison Danger and Leva Bates)	Tag team match for the Shimmer Tag Team Championship	17:43
11	Ayako Hamada defeated Athena	Singles match	20:49
12	Saraya Knight (c) defeated Cheerleader Melissa	Singles match for the Shimmer Championship	12:54
(c) / – the champion(s) heading into the match

== Volume 53 ==
Shimmer Women Athletes Volume 53
- Promotion: Shimmer Women Athletes
- Date: April 6, 2013
- City: Secaucus, New Jersey
- Venue: Meadowlands Exposition Center

No.	Results	Stipulations	Times
1	Amazing Kong defeated Mia Yim	Singles match	7:43
2	Shazza McKenzie and Veda Scott defeated Cherry Bomb and Kimber Lee	Tag team match	5:05
3	Christina Von Eerie defeated Evie, Kalamity, Rhia O'Reilly and Yuu Yamagata	Five-way match	6:00
4	Mercedes Martinez defeated Ayumi Kurihara	Singles match	10:07
5	Regeneration X (Allison Danger and Leva Bates) and Serena Deeb (with Daffney) defeated The Midwest Militia (Jessicka Havok, Nevaeh and Sassy Stephie) (with Mademoiselle Rachelle)	Six-woman tag team match	11:07
6	Madison Eagles defeated Jessie McKay	Singles match	12:37
7	The Canadian NINJAs (Nicole Matthews and Portia Perez) (c) defeated Global Green Gangsters (Kellie Skater and Tomoka Nakagawa), Kana and LuFisto, and Made In Sin (Allysin Kay and Taylor Made)	Four-way elimination tag team match for the Shimmer Tag Team Championship	17:22
8	Athena defeated Ayako Hamada	Singles match	13:48
9	Cheerleader Melissa defeated Saraya Knight (c)	Steel Cage match for the Shimmer Championship	14:47
(c) / – the champion(s) heading into the match

Four-way tag team match eliminations
Elimination no.	Wrestler	Team	Eliminated by	Elimination move	Time
1	Allysin Kay	Team #4	Kellie Skater	Pinfall	N/A
2	LuFisto	Team #2	Kellie Skater	Pinfall	N/A
3	Kellie Skater	Team #3	Nicole Matthews	Pinfall	N/A

== Volume 54 ==
Shimmer Women Athletes Volume 54
- Promotion: Shimmer Women Athletes
- Date: April 13, 2013
- City: Berwyn, Illinois
- Venue: The Eagles Club

No.	Results	Stipulations	Times
1^{D}	Angie Skye, Marti Belle and Miss December defeated Leah Von Dutch, Pink Flash Kira and Xandra Bale	Six-woman tag team match	—
2^{D}	Heidi Lovelace defeated Angelus Layne	Singles match	—
3	Santana Garrett defeated Miss Natural	Singles match	7:39
4	MsChif defeated Rhia O'Reilly	Singles match	7:13
5	Evie defeated Kimber Lee	Singles match	7:31
6	Kalamity defeated Yuu Yamagata	Singles match	7:00
7	Shazza McKenzie and Veda Scott defeated Regeneration X (Allison Danger and Leva Bates)	Tag team match	9:28
8	Kana defeated Jessie McKay	Singles match	7:06
9	Ayako Hamada defeated Melanie Cruise	Singles match	7:28
10	Jessicka Havok defeated Serena Deeb	Singles match	9:22
11	Global Green Gangsters (Kellie Skater and Tomoka Nakagawa) defeated The Canadian NINJAs (Nicole Matthews and Portia Perez) (c) by countout	Tag team match for the Shimmer Tag Team Championship	12:19
12	Courtney Rush defeated Athena, Madison Eagles and Saraya Knight	Four-way #1 contender's match	15:56
13	Cheerleader Melissa (c) defeated Mercedes Martinez	Singles match for the Shimmer Championship	20:11
(c) / – the champion(s) heading into the match; D / – this was a dark match

== Volume 55 ==
Shimmer Women Athletes Volume 55
- Promotion: Shimmer Women Athletes
- Date: April 13, 2013
- City: Berwyn, Illinois
- Venue: The Eagles Club

No.	Results	Stipulations	Times
1	Jessie McKay defeated Yuu Yamagata	Singles match	6:03
2	Allysin Kay (with Taylor Made) defeated Thunderkitty	Singles match	8:59
3	The Midwest Militia (Jessicka Havok and Sassy Stephie) (with Mademoiselle Rachelle) defeated Heidi Lovelace and Santana Garrett	Tag team match	8:37
4	Christina Von Eerie defeated Saraya Knight by disqualification	Singles match	10:14
5	Athena defeated Taylor Made (with Allysin Kay)	Singles match	9:33
6	Shazza McKenzie and Veda Scott defeated The Canadian NINJAs (Nicole Matthews and Portia Perez) (c) by disqualification	Tag team match for the Shimmer Tag Team Championship	10:33
7	Kalamity defeated MsChif	Singles match	8:43
8	Global Green Gangsters (Kellie Skater and Tomoka Nakagawa) defeated Regeneration X (Allison Danger and Leva Bates)	Tag team match	12:43
9	Madison Eagles defeated Kana	Singles match	15:38
10	Mercedes Martinez defeated Ayako Hamada	Singles match	12:47
11	Cheerleader Melissa (c) defeated Courtney Rush	Singles match for the Shimmer Championship	18:20
(c) / – the champion(s) heading into the match

== Volume 56 ==
Shimmer Women Athletes Volume 56
- Promotion: Shimmer Women Athletes
- Date: April 14, 2013
- City: Berwyn, Illinois
- Venue: The Eagles Club

No.	Results	Stipulations	Times
1^{D}	Angelus Layne defeated Marti Belle	Singles match	—
2^{D}	Pink Flash Kira and Xandra Bale defeated Angie Skye and Miss December	Tag team match	—
3	Kimber Lee defeated Shazza McKenzie	Singles match	7:01
4	Leva Bates defeated Miss Natural	Singles match	6:50
5	Rhia O'Reilly defeated Leah Von Dutch	Singles match	4:35
6	Kellie Skater defeated Nicole Matthews	Singles match	10:08
7	Saraya Knight defeated Jessie McKay	Singles match	8:20
8	Mia Yim defeated Evie	Singles match	8:59
9	Made in Sin (Allysin Kay and Taylor Made) defeated Christina Von Eerie and MsChif	Tag team match	9:51
10	Portia Perez vs. Tomoka Nakagawa ended in a double disqualification	Singles match	8:50
11	Kana defeated Ayako Hamada, Mercedes Martinez and Yuu Yamagata	Four-way match	17:41
12	Madison Eagles defeated Athena	Singles match	16:19
13	Serena Deeb defeated Jessicka Havok	Singles match	10:59
14	Cheerleader Melissa (c) defeated Kalamity	Singles match for the Shimmer Championship	14:34
(c) / – the champion(s) heading into the match; D / – this was a dark match

== Volume 57 ==
Shimmer Women Athletes Volume 57
- Promotion: Shimmer Women Athletes
- Date: April 14, 2013
- City: Berwyn, Illinois
- Venue: The Eagles Club

No.	Results	Stipulations	Times
1	Santana Garrett defeated Rhia O'Reilly	Singles match	7:41
2	Melanie Cruise defeated Xandra Bale	Singles match	4:30
3	Jessicka Havok defeated Mia Yim	Singles match	6:16
4	Christina Von Eerie, Shazza McKenzie and Veda Scott defeated Made in Sin (Allysin Kay and Taylor Made) and Saraya Knight	Six-woman tag team match	6:14
5	Thunderkitty defeated Sassy Stephie (with Mademoiselle Rachelle)	Singles match	7:25
6	Athena defeated Kimber Lee	Singles match	8:28
7	Jessie McKay defeated Mercedes Martinez	Singles match	8:12
8	Kana defeated Kalamity	Singles match	9:32
9	Regeneration X (Allison Danger and Leva Bates) defeated Ayako Hamada and Cheerleader Melissa by disqualification	Tag team match	13:44
10	Madison Eagles defeated Courtney Rush	Singles match	16:03
11	Global Green Gangsters (Kellie Skater and Tomoka Nakagawa) defeated The Canadian NINJAs (Nicole Matthews and Portia Perez) (c)	No Disqualification, No Count-Out tag team match for the Shimmer Tag Team Championship	11:22
(c) / – the champion(s) heading into the match

== Volume 58 ==
Shimmer Women Athletes Volume 58
- Promotion: Shimmer Women Athletes
- Date: October 19, 2013
- City: Berwyn, Illinois
- Venue: The Eagles Club

No.	Results	Stipulations	Times
1^{D}	JK Kennedy defeated Midiane	Singles match	—
2^{D}	Angie Skye defeated Crazy Mary Dobson	Singles match	—
3	Portia Perez defeated Thunderkitty	Singles match	7:22
4	Santana Garrett defeated Sassy Stephie (with Mademoiselle Rachelle)	Singles match	6:36
5	Jessicka Havok defeated Mary Lee Rose	Singles match	4:09
6	Nikki Storm defeated Su Yung	Singles match	6:56
7	Mercedes Martinez defeated Veda Scott	Singles match	6:50
8	Hikaru Shida defeated Mia Yim	Singles match	12:26
9	Cherry Bomb and Kimber Lee defeated MsEerie (Christina Von Eerie and MsChif)	Tag team match	8:18
10	Cheerleader Melissa (c) defeated Leva Bates	Singles match for the Shimmer Championship	7:57
11	Hiroyo Matsumoto defeated Saraya Knight	Singles match	5:06
12	Madison Eagles vs. Nicole Matthews ended in a time limit draw	Singles match	20:00
13	Global Green Gangsters (Kellie Skater and Tomoka Nakagawa) (c) defeated Kana and LuFisto	Tag team match for the Shimmer Tag Team Championship	16:19
(c) / – the champion(s) heading into the match; D / – this was a dark match

== Volume 59 ==
Shimmer Women Athletes Volume 59
- Promotion: Shimmer Women Athletes
- Date: October 19, 2013
- City: Berwyn, Illinois
- Venue: The Eagles Club

No.	Results	Stipulations	Times
1	Thunderkitty defeated Miss Natural	Singles match	8:37
2	Christina Von Eerie defeated Melanie Cruise, Su Yung and Saraya Knight	Four-way match	7:36
3	Nikki Storm defeated Veda Scott	Singles match	6:57
4	Nevaeh and Sassy Stephie (with Mademoiselle Rachelle) defeated Santana Garrett and Savannah Summers	Tag team match	6:00
5	Portia Perez defeated MsChif	Singles match	7:49
6	Kana defeated Kimber Lee	Singles match	8:44
7	Jessicka Havok defeated Leva Bates	Singles match	10:23
8	Madison Eagles defeated Mia Yim	Singles match	15:29
9	Global Green Gangsters (Kellie Skater and Tomoka Nakagawa) (c) defeated Made in Sin (Allysin Kay and Taylor Made)	Tag team match for the Shimmer Tag Team Championship	11:13
10	Nicole Matthews defeated Hikaru Shida	Singles match	10:21
11	LuFisto defeated Mercedes Martinez	Singles match	8:38
12	Cheerleader Melissa (c) defeated Hiroyo Matsumoto	Singles match for the Shimmer Championship	14:16
(c) / – the champion(s) heading into the match

== Volume 60 ==
Shimmer Women Athletes Volume 60
- Promotion: Shimmer Women Athletes
- Date: October 20, 2013
- City: Berwyn, Illinois
- Venue: The Eagles Club

No.	Results	Stipulations	Times
1^{D}	The New Old School Wrecking Crew (Knight Wagner and Markus Crane) defeated Moondog Bernard and Sea Man	Tag team match	—
2^{D}	Midiane defeated JK Kennedy	Singles match	—
3	Nikki Storm defeated Heidi Lovelace	Singles match	7:05
4	Mia Yim defeated Melanie Cruise	Singles match	8:50
5	Cherry Bomb and Kimber Lee defeated Crazy Mary Dobson and Mary Lee Rose	Tag team match	5:24
6	Saraya Knight defeated Thunderkitty	Singles match	8:45
7	Kana defeated Allysin Kay	Singles match	11:51
8	Portia Perez defeated Hiroyo Matsumoto	Singles match	12:44
9	Mercedes Martinez defeated Santana Garrett	Singles match	9:21
10	Global Green Gangsters (Kellie Skater and Tomoka Nakagawa) (c) defeated Nevaeh and Sassy Stephie (with Mademoiselle Rachelle)	Tag team match for the Shimmer Tag Team Championship	10:14
11	Madison Eagles defeated Jessicka Havok	Singles match	11:44
12	Hikaru Shida defeated Nicole Matthews	Kendo stick match	14:54
13	Cheerleader Melissa (c) defeated LuFisto	Singles match for the Shimmer Championship	15:36
(c) / – the champion(s) heading into the match; D / – this was a dark match

== Volume 61 ==
Shimmer Women Athletes Volume 61
- Promotion: Shimmer Women Athletes
- Date: October 20, 2013
- City: Berwyn, Illinois
- Venue: The Eagles Club

No.	Results	Stipulations	Times
1	Santana Garrett defeated Nevaeh (with Mademoiselle Rachelle)	Singles match	6:32
2	Jessicka Havok defeated Crazy Mary Dobson	Singles match	6:24
3	Mia Yim defeated Angie Skye	Singles match	7:46
4	Thunderkitty defeated Taylor Made	Singles match	8:06
5	Nicole Matthews defeated Heidi Lovelace	Singles match	8:14
6	Leva Bates defeated Nikki Storm	Singles match	6:51
7	MsChif defeated Miss Natural	Singles match	7:59
8	Hiroyo Matsumoto defeated Portia Perez	Singles match	8:43
9	Global Green Gangsters (Kellie Skater and Tomoka Nakagawa) (c) defeated Cherry Bomb and Kimber Lee	Tag team match for the Shimmer Tag Team Championship	9:04
10	Christina Von Eerie defeated Saraya Knight	3 Stages of Hell match	14:36
11	Madison Eagles defeated Hikaru Shida and Kana	Three-way match	7:13
12	Mercedes Martinez defeated LuFisto	Falls Count Anywhere match	13:57
(c) / – the champion(s) heading into the match

== Volume 62 ==
Shimmer Women Athletes Volume 62
- Promotion: Shimmer Women Athletes
- Date: April 5, 2014
- City: New Orleans, Louisiana
- Venue: McAllister Auditorium

No.	Results	Stipulations	Times
1	Nevaeh and Sassy Stephie defeated Heidi Lovelace and Solo Darling	Tag team match	8:09
2	Leva Bates defeated Veda Scott	Singles match	4:58
3	Kay Lee Ray defeated Vanessa Kraven	Singles match	8:47
4	Ivelisse defeated Kimber Lee	Singles match	10:36
5	Athena defeated Candice LeRae	Singles match	11:27
6	Mercedes Martinez (c) defeated Courtney Rush	Singles match for the NCW Femmes Fatales International Championship	16:48
7	Nikki Storm defeated Thunderkitty	Singles match	6:32
8	Hikaru Shida defeated Evie	Singles match	11:02
9	Global Green Gangsters (Kellie Skater and Tomoka Nakagawa) (c) defeated Madison Eagles and Nicole Matthews	Tag team match for the Shimmer Tag Team Championship	15:41
10	Cheerleader Melissa (c) defeated LuFisto	Two out of three falls match for the Shimmer Championship	33:24
(c) / – the champion(s) heading into the match

== Volume 63 ==
Shimmer Women Athletes Volume 63
- Promotion: Shimmer Women Athletes
- Date: April 12, 2014
- City: Berwyn, Illinois
- Venue: The Eagles Club

No.	Results	Stipulations	Times
1^{D}	Angelus Layne defeated Mary Lee Rose	Singles match	—
2^{D}	Angie Skye and Stacy Shadows defeated Diana Hall and Pink Flash Kira	Tag team match	—
3	Evie defeated Rhia O'Reilly	Singles match	5:33
4	Nevaeh defeated Christina Von Eerie	Singles match	6:15
5	Jessicka Havok defeated Kay Lee Ray	Singles match	7:26
6	Courtney Rush defeated Marti Belle	Singles match	8:00
7	Cherry Bomb and Kimber Lee defeated Leva Bates and Veda Scott	Tag team match	7:48
8	Madison Eagles defeated Heidi Lovelace	Singles match	9:08
9	Saraya Knight defeated Tomoka Nakagawa	Singles match	9:10
10	Yumi Ohka defeated Athena	Singles match	9:15
11	Leon and Ray defeated The Canadian NINJAs (Nicole Matthews and Portia Perez)	Tag team match	11:58
12	Kellie Skater defeated Nikki Storm	Singles match	13:08
13	Mia Yim defeated Hikaru Shida	Singles match	15:52
14	LuFisto and Kana defeated Cheerleader Melissa and Mercedes Martinez	Tag team match	18:24
D / – this was a dark match

== Volume 64 ==
Shimmer Women Athletes Volume 64
- Promotion: Shimmer Women Athletes
- Date: April 12, 2014
- City: Berwyn, Illinois
- Venue: The Eagles Club

No.	Results	Stipulations	Times
1	Melanie Cruise defeated Kay Lee Ray and Nikki Storm	Three-way match	9:30
2	Athena defeated Cherry Bomb	Singles match	9:52
3	Heidi Lovelace defeated Angie Skye	Singles match	6:47
4	Rhia O'Reilly and Saraya Knight defeated Leva Bates and Veda Scott	Tag team match	7:14
5	Christina Von Eerie defeated Marti Belle	Singles match	5:05
6	LuFisto defeated Nevaeh	Singles match	10:18
7	Courtney Rush defeated Evie, Madison Eagles, and Nicole Matthews	Four-way match	14:57
8	Kana defeated Thunderkitty	Singles match	7:32
9	Hikaru Shida defeated Kimber Lee	Singles match	8:32
10	Mia Yim defeated Mercedes Martinez	Singles match	12:50
11	Global Green Gangsters (Kellie Skater and Tomoka Nakagawa) (c) defeated Leon and Ray	Tag team match for the Shimmer Tag Team Championship	22:25
12	Cheerleader Melissa (c) defeated Yumi Ohka	Singles match for the Shimmer Championship	22:36
(c) / – the champion(s) heading into the match

== Volume 65 ==
Shimmer Women Athletes Volume 65
- Promotion: Shimmer Women Athletes
- Date: April 13, 2014
- City: Berwyn, Illinois
- Venue: The Eagles Club

No.	Results	Stipulations	Times
1^{D}	Pink Flash Kira defeated Angelus Layne	Singles match	—
2^{D}	Alex Bernadino and Markus Crane defeated The Archangel and Moondog Bernard	Tag team match	—
3^{D}	Mary Lee Rose defeated Stacy Shadows	Singles match	—
4	Veda Scott defeated Leva Bates	Singles match	7:40
5	Christina Von Eerie defeated Angie Skye	Singles match	7:45
6	Thunderkitty defeated The Spider Lady	Singles match	7:04
7	Courtney Rush, Evie, and Heidi Lovelace defeated Jessicka Havok and The Canadian NINJAs (Nicole Matthews and Portia Perez)	Six-woman tag team match	12:49
8	Kana defeated Nikki Storm	Singles match	13:13
9	Global Green Gangsters (Kellie Skater and Tomoka Nakagawa) (c) defeated Rhia O'Reilly and Saraya Knight	Tag team match for the Shimmer Tag Team Championship	12:01
10	Yumi Ohka defeated LuFisto	Singles match	10:43
11	Leon and Ray defeated Cherry Bomb and Kimber Lee	Tag team match	12:42
12	Athena defeated Kay Lee Ray	Singles match	9:34
13	Mercedes Martinez defeated Hikaru Shida	Singles match	11:06
14	Cheerleader Melissa (c) defeated Mia Yim	Singles match for the Shimmer Championship	13:44
(c) / – the champion(s) heading into the match; D / – this was a dark match

== Volume 66 ==
Shimmer Women Athletes Volume 66
- Promotion: Shimmer Women Athletes
- Date: April 13, 2014
- City: Berwyn, Illinois
- Venue: The Eagles Club

No.	Results	Stipulations	Times
1	Leva Bates defeated Marti Belle	Singles match	6:33
2	Nikki Storm defeated Christina Von Eerie	Singles match	9:07
3	Kay Lee Ray defeated Leon, Kimber Lee, and Nevaeh	Four-way match	8:35
4	Evie defeated Nicole Matthews	Singles match	7:27
5	Yumi Ohka defeated Melanie Cruise	Singles match	6:53
6	Veda Scott defeated Courtney Rush	Singles match	7:15
7	Kana defeated Cherry Bomb	Singles match	11:25
8	Heidi Lovelace defeated Jessicka Havok	Singles match	8:28
9	Mia Yim defeated Ray	Singles match	11:47
10	LuFisto defeated Saraya Knight	No Disqualification, No Countout match	6:37
11	Hikaru Shida defeated Athena	Singles match	11:44
12	Global Green Gangsters (Kellie Skater and Tomoka Nakagawa) (c) defeated Cheerleader Melissa and Mercedes Martinez	Tag team match for the Shimmer Tag Team Championship	13:10
(c) / – the champion(s) heading into the match

== Volume 67 ==
Shimmer Women Athletes Volume 67
- Promotion: Shimmer Women Athletes
- Date: October 18, 2014
- City: Berwyn, Illinois
- Venue: The Eagles Club

No.	Results	Stipulations	Times
1	The Kimber Bombs (Cherry Bomb and Kimber Lee) defeated Bambi Hall and Peyton Royce	Tag team match	3:53
2	Heidi Lovelace defeated Nicole Savoy	Singles match	7:31
3	Sassy Stephie (with Mademoiselle Rachelle) defeated Crazy Mary Dobson	Singles match	6:01
4	Athena defeated Nikki Storm	Singles match	9:07
5	Portia Perez defeated Courtney Rush by disqualification	Singles match	7:26
6	Nevaeh defeated Jenny Rose	Singles match	8:53
7	Mayumi Ozaki defeated Saraya Knight	No disqualification match	6:24
8	Evie defeated Kay Lee Ray	Singles match	11:57
9	LuFisto defeated Rhia O'Reilly	Singles match	7:53
10	Madison Eagles vs. Nicole Matthews ended in a draw	No Disqualification, No Countout match	20:13
11	Akino, Kaori Yoneyama and Tsukasa Fujimoto defeated Mia Yim and Global Green Gangsters (Kellie Skater and Tomoka Nakagawa)	Six-woman tag team match	20:59
12	Cheerleader Melissa (c) defeated Kana	Singles match for the Shimmer Championship	21:35
(c) / – the champion(s) heading into the match

== Volume 68 ==
Shimmer Women Athletes Volume 68
- Promotion: Shimmer Women Athletes
- Date: October 18, 2014
- City: Berwyn, Illinois
- Venue: The Eagles Club

No.	Results	Stipulations	Times
1	Cherry Bomb defeated Thunderkitty	Singles match	7:35
2	Marti Belle defeated Solo Darling (with Daffney)	Singles match	6:02
3	Xandra Bale defeated Miss Natural	Singles match	8:12
4	Kay Lee Ray defeated Kimber Lee	Singles match	8:20
5	Leva Bates defeated Nevaeh	Singles match	8:23
6	Nikki Storm defeated Candice LeRae	Singles match	6:58
7	Courtney Rush defeated Veda Scott	Singles match	8:07
8	Akino defeated Heidi Lovelace	Singles match	11:41
9	Vanessa Kraven defeated Jessicka Havok by countout	Singles match	11:21
10	Mayumi Ozaki and Saraya Knight (with Rhia O'Reilly) defeated Kana and LuFisto	No disqualification match	7:56
11	Evie defeated Mia Yim	Singles match	13:26
12	Global Green Gangsters (Kellie Skater and Tomoka Nakagawa) (c) defeated Kaori Yoneyama and Tsukasa Fujimoto	Tag team match for the Shimmer Tag Team Championship	11:18
13	Nicole Matthews defeated Cheerleader Melissa (c), Athena and Madison Eagles	Four-way elimination match for the Shimmer Championship	18:01
(c) / – the champion(s) heading into the match

== Volume 69 ==
Shimmer Women Athletes Volume 69
- Promotion: Shimmer Women Athletes
- Date: October 19, 2014
- City: Berwyn, Illinois
- Venue: The Eagles Club

No.	Results	Stipulations	Times
1	Courtney Rush defeated Nikki Storm	Singles match	8:18
2	Madison Eagles defeated Marti Belle	Singles match	2:16
3	The Kimber Bombs (Cherry Bomb and Kimber Lee) defeated The Buddy System (Heidi Lovelace and Solo Darling) (with Daffney)	Tag team match	7:09
4	Rhia O'Reilly defeated Xandra Bale	Singles match	5:51
5	Jenny Rose defeated Candice LeRae, Leva Bates and Veda Scott	Four-way match	4:33
6	LuFisto defeated Nicole Savoy	Singles match	9:42
7	Kaori Yoneyama and Tsukasa Fujimoto defeated Nevaeh and Sassy Stephie (with Mademoiselle Rachelle)	Tag team match	11:48
8	Cheerleader Melissa defeated Athena	Singles match	5:02
9	Kana defeated Kay Lee Ray	Singles match	10:31
10	Portia Perez defeated Jessicka Havok by disqualification	Singles match	4:46
11	Mia Yim defeated Akino	Singles match	13:10
12	Global Green Gangsters (Kellie Skater and Tomoka Nakagawa) (c) defeated Mayumi Ozaki and Saraya Knight (with Rhia O'Reilly)	No disqualification tag team match for the Shimmer Tag Team Championship	13:19
13	Nicole Matthews (c) defeated Evie	Singles match for the Shimmer Championship	15:01
(c) / – the champion(s) heading into the match

== Volume 70 ==
Shimmer Women Athletes Volume 70
- Promotion: Shimmer Women Athletes
- Date: October 19, 2014
- City: Berwyn, Illinois
- Venue: The Eagles Club

No.	Results	Stipulations	Times
1	Nikki Storm defeated Kaori Yoneyama	Singles match	6:06
2	Vanessa Kraven defeated Crazy Mary Dobson	Singles match	7:28
3	Made in Sin (Allysin Kay and Taylor Made) defeated Bambi Hall and Peyton Royce	Tag team match	6:32
4	Kay Lee Ray defeated Candice LeRae	Singles match	10:59
5	Mayumi Ozaki, Rhia O'Reilly and Saraya Knight defeated Leva Bates and The Buddy System (Heidi Lovelace and Solo Darling) (with Daffney)	No disqualification six-woman tag team match	11:02
6	Veda Scott defeated Thunderkitty	Singles match	5:10
7	Evie defeated Jenny Rose	Singles match	7:02
8	Akino defeated LuFisto	Singles match	6:20
9	Miss Natural defeated Xandra Bale	Singles match	6:19
10	Mia Yim defeated Tsukasa Fujimoto	Singles match	8:39
11	Kana defeated Courtney Rush	Singles match	6:34
12	Athena defeated Cheerleader Melissa	Knockout or Submission match	15:04
13	Global Green Gangsters (Kellie Skater and Tomoka Nakagawa), Jessicka Havok and Madison Eagles defeated The Canadian NINJAs (Nicole Matthews and Portia Perez) and The Kimber Bombs (Cherry Bomb and Kimber Lee)	No disqualification eight-woman tag team match	25:49

== Volume 71 ==
Shimmer Women Athletes Volume 71
- Promotion: Shimmer Women Athletes
- Date: March 28, 2015
- City: San Jose, California
- Venue: Santa Clara County Fairgrounds

No.	Results	Stipulations	Times
1	Evie defeated Portia Perez	Singles match; first round of the ChickFight tournament	7:28
2	Nicole Savoy defeated Candice LeRae	Singles match; first round of the ChickFight tournament	7:37
3	Nikki Storm defeated Cherry Bomb	Singles match; first round of the ChickFight tournament	6:30
4	Kay Lee Ray defeated Kimber Lee	Singles match; first round of the ChickFight tournament	7:18
5	Mia Yim defeated Athena	Singles match; first round of the ChickFight tournament	11:38
6	Cheerleader Melissa defeated Jessicka Havok	Singles match; first round of the ChickFight tournament	8:10
7	Evie defeated Nicole Savoy	Singles match; semifinals of the ChickFight tournament	9:05
8	Kay Lee Ray defeated Nikki Storm	Singles match; semifinals of the ChickFight tournament	8:28
9	Cheerleader Melissa defeated Mia Yim by disqualification	Singles match; semifinals of the ChickFight tournament	7:46
10	Nicole Matthews (c) defeated Tomoka Nakagawa	Singles match for the Shimmer Championship	16:14
11	Kay Lee Ray defeated Cheerleader Melissa and Evie	Three-way elimination match; finals of the ChickFight tournament	12:11
(c) / – the champion(s) heading into the match

== Volume 72 ==
Shimmer Women Athletes Volume 72
- Promotion: Shimmer Women Athletes
- Date: April 11, 2015
- City: Berwyn, Illinois
- Venue: The Eagles Club

No.	Results	Stipulations	Times
1	Jessicka Havok defeated Cheerleader Melissa	Singles match	11:26
2	Courtney Rush and Xandra Bale defeated Made in Sin (Allysin Kay and Taylor Made)	Tag team match	9:24
3	Vanessa Kraven defeated Thunderkitty	Singles match	6:42
4	Misaki Ohata defeated Nicole Savoy	Singles match	7:50
5	LuFisto defeated Miss Natural	Singles match	7:40
6	Veda Scott defeated Shazza McKenzie	Singles match	7:57
7	Akino defeated Portia Perez	Singles match	11:02
8	Evie and Heidi Lovelace defeated Mayumi Ozaki and Saraya Knight	No disqualification tag team match	7:40
9	Madison Eagles defeated Yumi Ohka	Singles match	17:37
10	Athena defeated Mia Yim	Two out of three falls match	22:15
11	The Kimber Bombs (Cherry Bomb and Kimber Lee) defeated Global Green Gangsters (Kellie Skater and Tomoka Nakagawa) (c)	Tag team match for the Shimmer Tag Team Championship	16:23
12	Nicole Matthews (c) defeated Kay Lee Ray	Singles match for the Shimmer Championship	11:13
(c) / – the champion(s) heading into the match

== Volume 73 ==
Shimmer Women Athletes Volume 73
- Promotion: Shimmer Women Athletes
- Date: April 11, 2015
- City: Berwyn, Illinois
- Venue: The Eagles Club

No.	Results	Stipulations	Times
1^{D}	LuFisto defeated Marti Belle	Singles match	7:28
2	Melanie Cruise defeated Crazy Mary Dobson	Singles match	5:44
3	Cheerleader Melissa defeated Thunderkitty	Singles match	7:50
4	Mia Yim defeated Kyoko Kimura	Singles match	10:28
5	Kay Lee Ray defeated Saraya Knight	Singles match	6:43
6	Evie defeated Allysin Kay, Kellie Skater and Nicole Savoy	Four-way match	8:05
7	Tessa Blanchard defeated Athena	Singles match	7:52
8	The Kimber Bombs (Cherry Bomb and Kimber Lee) (c) defeated Ontario's Top Team (Courtney Rush and Xandra Bale)	Tag team match for the Shimmer Tag Team Championship	9:23
9	Heidi Lovelace defeated Misaki Ohata	Singles match	12:37
10	Madison Eagles defeated Portia Perez	#1 contender the Shimmer Championship match	6:31
11	Tomoka Nakagawa defeated Akino	Singles match	16:34
12	Nicole Matthews (c) defeated Jessicka Havok	Singles match for the Shimmer Championship	18:11
(c) / – the champion(s) heading into the match; D / – this was a dark match

== Volume 74 ==
Shimmer Women Athletes Volume 74
- Promotion: Shimmer Women Athletes
- Date: April 12, 2015
- City: Berwyn, Illinois
- Venue: The Eagles Club

No.	Results	Stipulations	Times
1	Crazy Mary Dobson defeated Portia Perez	Singles match	4:32
2	Thunderkitty defeated Angelus Layne	Singles match	5:27
3	Saraya Knight defeated Kay Lee Ray, Kimber Lee and Mia Yim	Four Corner Survival match	6:50
4	Yumi Ohka defeated Nicole Savoy	Singles match	8:30
5	Melanie Cruise defeated Shazza McKenzie	Singles match	7:02
6	Candice LeRae defeated Cherry Bomb	Singles match	8:57
7	Jessicka Havok defeated Veda Scott	Singles match	5:10
8	Team Slap Happy (Evie and Heidi Lovelace) defeated Ontario's Top Team (Courtney Rush and Xandra Bale)	Tag team match	8:44
9	Athena defeated Vanessa Kraven (with Tessa Blanchard) by disqualification	Singles match	9:47
10	Cheerleader Melissa defeated Akino	Singles match	13:55
11	Nicole Matthews (c) defeated Madison Eagles	Singles match for the Shimmer Championship	17:11
12	Aja Kong, Dynamite Kansai, Kyoko Kimura and Mayumi Ozaki defeated Hiroyo Matsumoto, Kellie Skater, Misaki Ohata and Tomoka Nakagawa	No disqualification eight-woman tag team match	26:10
(c) / – the champion(s) heading into the match

== Volume 75 ==
Shimmer Women Athletes Volume 75
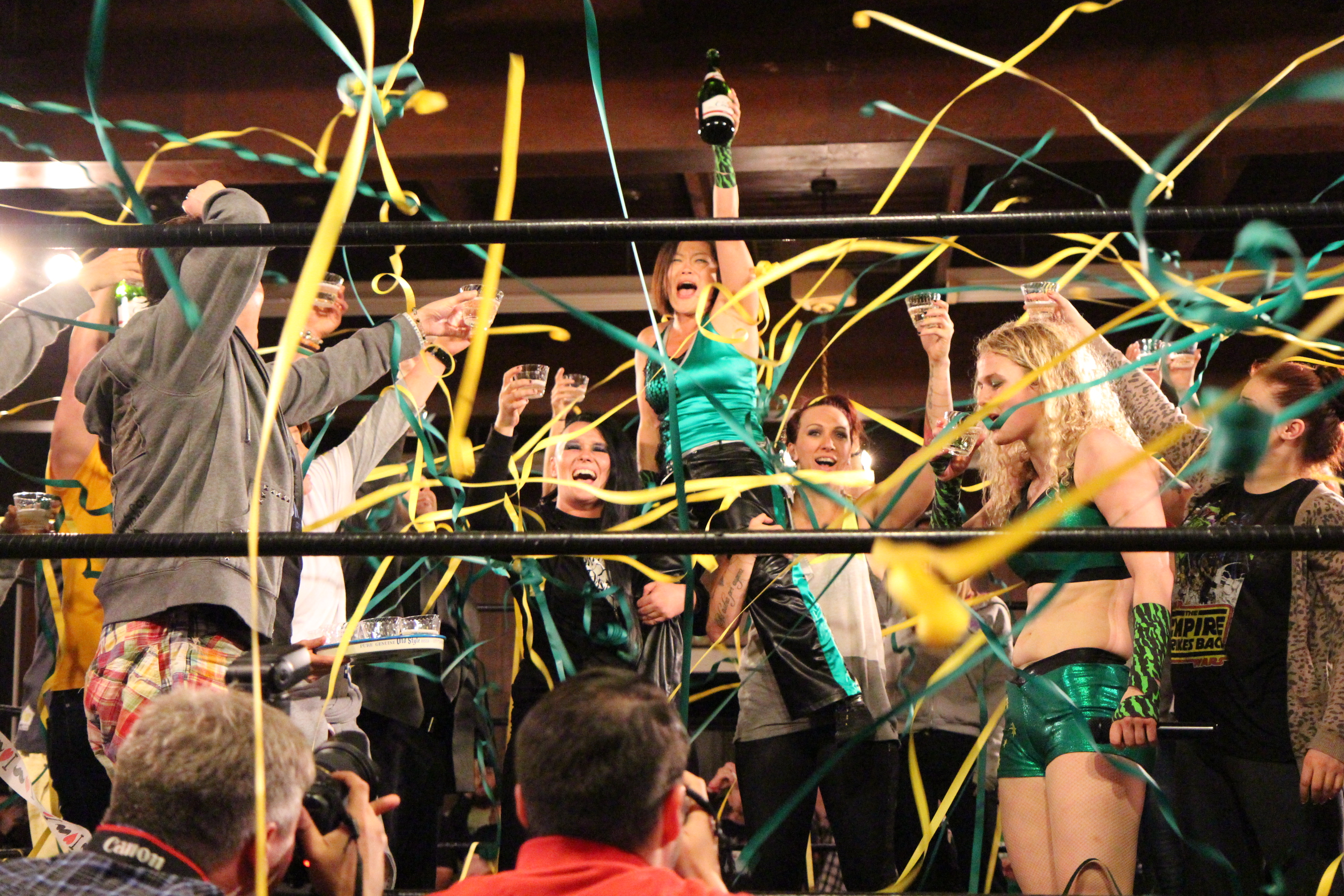
- Volume 75 featured the final match and retirement of Tomoka Nakagawa
- Promotion: Shimmer Women Athletes
- Date: April 12, 2015
- City: Berwyn, Illinois
- Venue: The Eagles Club

No.	Results	Stipulations	Times
1	Shazza McKenzie defeated Marti Belle	Singles match	5:37
2	Miss Natural defeated Crazy Mary Dobson	Singles match	5:18
3	Akino defeated Kay Lee Ray	Singles match	10:29
4	Jessicka Havok defeated Melanie Cruise	Singles match	6:26
5	Courtney Rush defeated Xandra Bale	Singles match	6:11
6	Misaki Ohata defeated LuFisto	Singles match	9:49
7	Athena defeated Tessa Blanchard (with Vanessa Kraven)	Singles match	9:43
8	Nicole Savoy defeated Mia Yim	Singles match	10:30
9	Cheerleader Melissa defeated Candice LeRae	Singles match	13:34
10	The Kimber Bombs (Cherry Bomb and Kimber Lee) (c) defeated Team Slap Happy (Evie and Heidi Lovelace)	Tag team match for the Shimmer Tag Team Championship	10:34
11	Madison Eagles defeated Saraya Knight	Singles match	8:46
12	Global Green Gangsters (Kellie Skater and Tomoka Nakagawa) defeated The Canadian NINJAs (Nicole Matthews and Portia Perez)	Tag team match	16:51
(c) / – the champion(s) heading into the match

== Volume 76 ==
Shimmer Women Athletes Volume 76
- Promotion: Shimmer Women Athletes
- Date: October 10, 2015
- City: Berwyn, Illinois
- Venue: The Eagles Club

No.	Results	Stipulations	Times
1	Candice LeRae defeated Allysin Kay, Cheerleader Melissa, Evie, Heidi Lovelace, Hiroyo Matsumoto, Kay Lee Ray, Kellie Skater, Kellyanne English, Kimber Lee, Madison Eagles, Mia Yim, Rhia O’Reilly, Shazza McKenzie, Tessa Blanchard, Thunderkitty, Vanessa Kraven, Veda Scott, Xandra Bale and Yumi Ohka	Number one contender's Battle royal for the Shimmer Championship	13:12
2	LuFisto defeated Taylor Made	Singles match	7:21
3	Sonoko Kato defeated Kimber Lee (with Cherry Bomb)	Singles match	8:51
4	Courtney Rush defeated Shazza McKenzie	Singles match	5:33
5	Mia Yim defeated Kellyane English	Singles match	9:21
6	Yumi Ohka defeated Makoto	Singles match	9:24
7	Cheerleader Melissa defeated Crazy Mary Dobson	Singles match	8:02
8	Team Slap Happy (Evie and Heidi Lovelace) defeated Rhia O'Reilly and Saraya Knight	Shimmer Tag Team Championship number one contender's tournament match	8:31
9	Nicole Savoy defeated Hiroyo Matsumoto	Singles match	9:03
10	Kellie Skater defeated Kay Lee Ray	Singles match	5:02
11	Nicole Matthews (c) defeated Candice LeRae	Singles match for the Shimmer Championship	14:20
(c) / – the champion(s) heading into the match

== Volume 77 ==
Shimmer Women Athletes Volume 77
- Promotion: Shimmer Women Athletes
- Date: October 10, 2015
- City: Berwyn, Illinois
- Venue: The Eagles Club

No.	Results	Stipulations
1	Veda Scott defeated K. C. Spinelli	Singles match
2	Saraya Knight (with Rhia O'Reilly) defeated Xandra Bale	Singles match
3	Liberty defeated Sammi Baynz	Singles match
4	Kay Lee Ray defeated Allysin Kay, Candice LeRae, Kellie Skater, Marti Belle and Sonoko Kato	Six-way match
5	Courtney Rush defeated Crazy Mary Dobson	Singles match
6	Jessicka Havok defeated Yumi Ohka	Singles match
7	Kimber Lee (with Cherry Bomb) defeated Heidi Lovelace	Singles match
8	Cheerleader Melissa defeated Makoto	Singles match
9	Tessa Blanchard and Vanessa Kraven defeated The Lucha Sisters (Leva Bates and Mia Yim)	Shimmer Tag Team Championship number one contender's tournament match
10	Nicole Savoy defeated Evie	Singles match
11	Madison Eagles defeated Nicole Matthews (c)	No disqualification match for the Shimmer Championship
12	Hiroyo Matsumoto defeated Thunderkitty	Singles match (match taped October 11, 2015)
(c) / – the champion(s) heading into the match

== Volume 78 ==
Shimmer Women Athletes Volume 78
- Promotion: Shimmer Women Athletes
- Date: October 11, 2015
- City: Berwyn, Illinois
- Venue: The Eagles Club

No.	Results	Stipulations
1^{D}	Mary Elizabeth Monroe defeated Paloma Starr	Singles match
2	Solo Darling defeated ACR	Singles match
3	LuFisto defeated Veda Scott	Singles match
4	Allysin Kay defeated Shazza McKenzie	Singles match
5	Rhia O'Reilly defeated Leva Bates	Singles match
6	Team Slap Happy (Evie and Heidi Lovelace) defeated Tessa Blanchard and Vanessa Kraven	Shimmer Tag Team Championship number one contender's tournament final
7	Jessicka Havok defeated Kimber Lee (with Cherry Bomb)	Singles match
8	Courtney Rush defeated Liberty	Singles match
9	Nicole Matthews defeated Mia Yim	Singles match
10	Kay Lee Ray defeated Kellyanne	Singles match
11	Cheerleader Melissa and Yumi Ohka defeated Hiroyo Matsumoto and Makoto	Tag team match
12	Kellie Skater defeated Sonoko Kato	Singles match
13	Madison Eagles (c) defeated Nicole Savoy	Singles match for the Shimmer Championship
(c) / – the champion(s) heading into the match; D / – this was a dark match

== Volume 79 ==
Shimmer Women Athletes Volume 79
- Promotion: Shimmer Women Athletes
- Date: October 11, 2015
- City: Berwyn, Illinois
- Venue: The Eagles Club

No.	Results	Stipulations
1	Leva Bates defeated Thunderkitty	Singles match
2	Vanessa Kraven (with Tessa Blanchard) defeated LuFisto	Singles match
3	Makoto defeated Marti Belle	Singles match
4	Jessicka Havok defeated Sammi Baynz	Singles match
5	Cheerleader Melissa and Yumi Ohka defeated Team BaleSpin (K. C. Spinelli and Xandra Bale)	Tag team match
6	Kay Lee Ray defeated Liberty	Singles match
7	Shazza McKenzie defeated Allysin Kay, Mia Yim and Veda Scott	Four-way match
8	Heidi Lovelace (with Evie) defeated Kellyanne	Singles match
9	Crazy Mary Dobson defeated Saraya Knight	Singles match
10	Sonoko Kato defeated Nicole Savoy	Singles match
11	Hiroyo Matsumoto defeated Rhia O'Reilly	Singles match
12	Team Danger (Daizee Haze, Kellie Skater, Lexie Fyfe and Madison Eagles) (with Allison Danger and Tomoka Nakagawa) defeated Team Perez (Kimber Lee, Lacey, Nicole Matthews and Portia Perez) (with Cherry Bomb)	Eight-woman tag team match

== Volume 80 ==
Shimmer Women Athletes Volume 80
- Promotion: Shimmer Women Athletes
- Date: April 2, 2016
- City: Dallas, Texas
- Venue: Eddie Deen's Ranch

12 Woman Tournament to crown the first Heart of Shimmer Champion.

No.	Results	Stipulations
1	Cheerleader Melissa defeated Leva Bates	1st round tournament match for the Heart of Shimmer Championship
2	Candice LaRae defeated Cherry Bomb	1st round tournament match for the Heart of Shimmer Championship
3	Nicole Savoy defeated LuFisto	1st round tournament match for the Heart of Shimmer Championship
4	Kimber Lee defeated Jessicka Havok	1st round tournament match for the Heart of Shimmer Championship
5	Heidi Lovelace defeated Veda Scott	1st round tournament match for the Heart of Shimmer Championship
6	Nicole Matthews defeated Crazy Mary Dobson	1st round tournament match for the Heart of Shimmer Championship
7	Candice LaRae defeated Cheerleader Melissa	2nd round tournament match for the Heart of Shimmer Championship
8	Nicole Savoy defeated Kimber Lee	2nd round tournament match for the Heart of Shimmer Championship
9	Heidi Lovelace defeated Nicole Matthews	2nd round tournament match for the Heart of Shimmer Championship
10	Nicole Savoy defeated Candice LaRae and Heidi Lovelace	Tournament finals match for the Heart of Shimmer Championship

== Volume 81 ==
Shimmer Women Athletes Volume 81
- Promotion: Shimmer Women Athletes
- Date: June 24, 2016
- City: Chicago, Illinois
- Venue: Logan Square Auditorium

No.	Results	Stipulations
1	Veda Scott defeated Nixon Newell	Singles match
2	Shayna Baszler defeated Rhia O'Reilly	Singles match
3	Kellie Skater defeated LuFisto and Shazza McKenzie and Vanessa Kraven	Four-way match
4	Viper defeated Jessicka Havok	Singles match
5	Flying High WDSS (Kay Lee Ray and Mia Yim) defeated Melanie Cruise and Yumi Ohka	Tag team match
6	Arisa Nakajima defeated Nicole Matthews	Singles match
7	Ryo Mizunami defeated K. C. Spinelli	Singles match
8	Nicole Savoy (c) defeated Crazy Mary Dobson	Singles match for the Heart of Shimmer Championship
9	The Kimber Bombs (Cherry Bomb and Kimber Lee) (c) defeated Team Slap Happy (Evie and Heidi Lovelace)	Tag Team match for the Shimmer Tag Team Championship
10	Madison Eagles (c) defeated Courtney Rush	Singles match for the Shimmer Championship
(c) / – the champion(s) heading into the match

== Volume 82 ==
Shimmer Women Athletes Volume 82
- Promotion: Shimmer Women Athletes
- Date: June 25, 2016
- City: Chicago, Illinois
- Venue: Logan Square Auditorium

No.	Results	Stipulations
1	LuFisto defeated Vanessa Kraven (with Tessa Blanchard)	Singles match
2	Shayna Baszler defeated Solo Darling	Singles match
3	Viper defeated Heidi Lovelace	Singles match
4	K. C. Spinelli and Xandra Bale defeated Crazy Mary Dobson and Samantha Heights	Tag team match
5	Shazza McKenzie defeated Evie	Singles match
6	Nicole Matthews defeated Nixon Newell	Singles match
7	Tessa Blanchard (with Vanessa Kraven) defeated Thunderkitty	Singles match
8	Kellie Skater defeated Courtney Rush	Singles match
9	Nicole Savoy (c) defeated Ryo Mizunami	Singles match for the Heart of Shimmer Championship
10	The Kimber Bombs (Cherry Bomb and Kimber Lee) (c) defeated Fly High WDSS (Kay Lee Ray and Mia Yim)	Tag Team match for the Shimmer Tag Team Championship
11	Madison Eagles (c) defeated Arisa Nakajima by disqualification	Singles match for the Shimmer Championship
(c) / – the champion(s) heading into the match

== Volume 83 ==
Shimmer Women Athletes Volume 83
- Promotion: Shimmer Women Athletes
- Date: June 25, 2016
- City: Chicago, Illinois
- Venue: Logan Square Auditorium

No.	Results	Stipulations
1	Veda Scott defeated Crazy Mary Dobson	Singles match
2	Heidi Lovelace defeated Taylor Made	Singles match
3	Nicole Matthews defeated Shazza McKenzie	Singles match
4	Jessicka Havok defeated Allysin Kay, Mia Yim and Yumi Ohka	Four-way match
5	Kay Lee Ray defeated Rhia O'Reilly	Singles match
6	Tessa Blanchard (with Vanessa Kraven) defeated Evie	Singles match
7	Nicole Savoy (c) defeated Shayna Baszler	Singles match for the Heart of Shimmer Championship
8	The Kimber Bombs (c) (Cherry Bomb and Kimber Lee) defeated Balespin (K. C. Spinelli and Xandra Bale)	Tag team match for the Shimmer Tag Team Championship
9	Kellie Skater defeated Ryo Mizunami	Singles match
10	Madison Eagles (c) defeated Viper	Singles match for the Shimmer Championship
(c) / – the champion(s) heading into the match

== Volume 84 ==
Shimmer Women Athletes Volume 84
- Promotion: Shimmer Women Athletes
- Date: June 26, 2016
- City: Berwyn, Illinois
- Venue: The Eagles Club

No.	Results	Stipulations
1	Nixon Newell defeated Veda Scott in a rematch from Volume 81.	Singles match
2	Melanie Cruise and Yumi Ohka defeated Solo Darling and Scarlett Bordeaux	Tag team match
3	Arisa Nakajima defeated Rhia O'Reilly	Singles match
4	Nicole Matthews defeated Thunderkitty	Singles match
5	Tessa Blanchard defeated Lufisto	Singles match
6	Ryo Mizunami defeated Courtney Rush	Singles match
7	Nicole Savoy (c) defeated Jessicka Havok	Singles match for the Heart of Shimmer Championship
8	Team Slap Happy (Evie and Heidi Lovelace) defeated The Kimber Bombs (c) (Kimber Lee and Cherry Bomb), Fly High WDSS (Mia Yim and Kay Lee Ray) and Balespin (K. C. Spinelli and Xandra Bale)	Four-way tag team match for the Shimmer Tag Team Championship
9	Kellie Skater defeated Madison Eagles (c) by countout	Singles match for the Shimmer Championship
(c) / – the champion(s) heading into the match

== Volume 85 ==
Shimmer Women Athletes Volume 85
- Promotion: Shimmer Women Athletes
- Date: June 26, 2016
- City: Berwyn, Illinois
- Venue: The Eagles Club

No.	Results	Stipulations
1	Lufisto defeated ACR	Singles match
2	Nicole Matthews defeated Rhia O'Reilly.	Singles match
3	Allysin Kay defeated Xandra Bale.	Singles match
4	Arisa Nakajima defeated Shazza McKenzie	Singles match
5	Kimber Lee defeated Thunderkitty	Singles match
6	Shayna Baszler defeated Mia Yim	Singles match
7	Courtney Rush defeated Nixon Newell, Vanessa Kraven (with Tessa Blanchard) and Viper	Four-way match
8	Nicole Savoy (c) defeated Kay Lee Ray by submission	Singles match for the Heart of Shimmer Championship
9	Team Slap Happy (Evie and Heidi Lovelace) (c) defeated Melanie Cruise and Yumi Ohka	Tag team match for the Shimmer Tag Team Championship
10	Mercedes Martinez defeated Madison Eagles (c)	Singles match for the Shimmer Championship
(c) / – the champion(s) heading into the match

== Volume 86 ==
Shimmer Women Athletes Volume 86
- Promotion: Shimmer Women Athletes
- Date: November 11, 2016
- City: Chicago, Illinois
- Venue: Logan Square Auditorium

No.	Results	Stipulations
1	Rhia O'Reilly defeated Kimber Lee	Singles match
2	Leva Bates defeated Angel Dust	Singles match
3	Melanie Cruise defeated Shotzi Blackheart	Singles match
4	Hudson Envy defeated Xandra Bale	Singles match
5	Cat Power defeated Nixon Newell	Singles match
6	Tessa Blanchard (with Vanessa Kraven) defeated Jessicka Havok	Singles match
7	Team Slap Happy (c) (Evie and Heidi Lovelace) defeated Fly High WDSS (Kay Lee Ray and Mia Yim)	Tag team match for the Shimmer Tag Team Championship
8	Vanessa Kraven (with Tessa Blanchard) defeated Candice LeRae	Singles match
9	Mickie James defeated Nicole Matthews	Singles match
10	The Aussie Squad (Kellie Skater and Shazza McKenzie) defeated Trifecta (Mercedes Martinez and Shayna Baszler) (with Nicole Savoy)	Tag team match
(c) / – the champion(s) heading into the match

== Volume 87 ==
Shimmer Women Athletes Volume 87
- Promotion: Shimmer Women Athletes
- Date: November 12, 2016
- City: Chicago, Illinois
- Venue: Logan Square Auditorium

No.	Results	Stipulations
1^{D}	The Buru Death Squad (Kikyo and Roni Nicole) defeated Arianna and Savannah Evans	Tag team match
2	Evie defeated Veda Scott	Singles match
3	Taeler Hendrix defeated Thunderkitty	Singles match
4	Candice LeRae defeated Leva Bates	Singles match
5	The Rejected (Christina Von Eerie and Hudson Envy) defeated K. C. Spinelli and Xandra Bale	Tag team match
6	Rhia O'Reilly defeated Cherry Bomb	Singles match
7	Cat Power defeated Mia Yim	Singles match
8	Dulce Garcia defeated LuFisto	Singles match
9	Vanessa Kraven (with Tessa Blanchard) defeated Shayna Baszler (with Nicole Savoy) and Kay Lee Ray and Heidi Lovelace	Fatal four-way match
10	Nicole Matthews defeated Saraya Knight by submission	Singles match
11	Kellie Skater defeated Mercedes Martinez (c)	Singles match for the Shimmer Championship
(c) / – the champion(s) heading into the match; D / – this was a dark match

== Volume 88 ==
Shimmer Women Athletes Volume 88
- Promotion: Shimmer Women Athletes
- Date: November 12, 2016
- City: Chicago, Illinois
- Venue: Logan Square Auditorium

No.	Results	Stipulations
1	Marti Belle defeated K. C. Spinelli	Singles match
2	Tessa Blanchard defeated Jessicka Havok	Singles match
3	Mia Yim defeated Nevaeh	Singles match
4	Allysin Kay defeated Candice LeRae	Singles match
5	Veda Scott defeated Solo Darling	Singles match
6	Mercedes Martinez defeated Nixon Newell	Singles match
7	Team Slap Happy (Evie and Heidi Lovelace) (c) defeated The Rejected (Christina Von Eerie and Hudson Envy)	Tag team match for the Shimmer Tag Team Championship
8	Shazza McKenzie defeated Shayna Baszler by disqualification	Singles match
9	Cat Power defeated Kay Lee Ray	Singles match
10	Mickie James, Rhia O'Reilly and Saraya Knight defeated The Kimber Bombs (Cherry Bomb and Kimber Lee) and Nicole Matthews	Six-man tag team match
11	Kellie Skater (c) defeated Vanessa Kraven (with Tessa Blanchard)	Singles match for the Shimmer Championship
(c) / – the champion(s) heading into the match

== Volume 89 ==
Shimmer Women Athletes Volume 89
- Promotion: Shimmer Women Athletes
- Date: November 13, 2016
- City: Berwyn, Illinois
- Venue: Berwyn Eagles Club

No.	Results	Stipulations
1^{D}	Sonya Strong defeated Heather Monroe	Singles match
2^{D}	Angie Skye defeated Kate Carney	Singles match
3	Cherry Bomb defeated Solo Darling	Singles match
4	Thunderkitty defeated Taeler Hendrix by submission	Singles match
5	Nixon Newell defeated LuFisto	Singles match
6	Mia Yim defeated Kennadi Brink	Singles match
7	Kimber Lee defeated Samantha Heights	Singles match
8	BaleSpin (K. C. Spinelli and Xandra Bale) defeated The Rejected (Christina Von Eerie and Hudson Envy)	Tag team match
9	Jessicka Havok defeated Allysin Kay	Singles match
10	Nicole Matthews defeated Candice LeRae, Kay Lee Ray and Rhia O'Reilly	Four-way match
11	Shazza McKenzie defeated Shayna Baszler	No disqualification match
12	Mount Tessa (Tessa Blanchard and Vanessa Kraven) defeated Team Slap Happy (Evie and Heidi Lovelace) (c)	Tag team match for the Shimmer Tag Team Championship
13	Mercedes Martinez defeated Dulce Garcia	Singles match
14	Kellie Skater (c) defeated Cat Power	Singles match for the Shimmer Championship
(c) / – the champion(s) heading into the match; D / – this was a dark match

== Volume 90 ==
Shimmer Women Athletes Volume 90
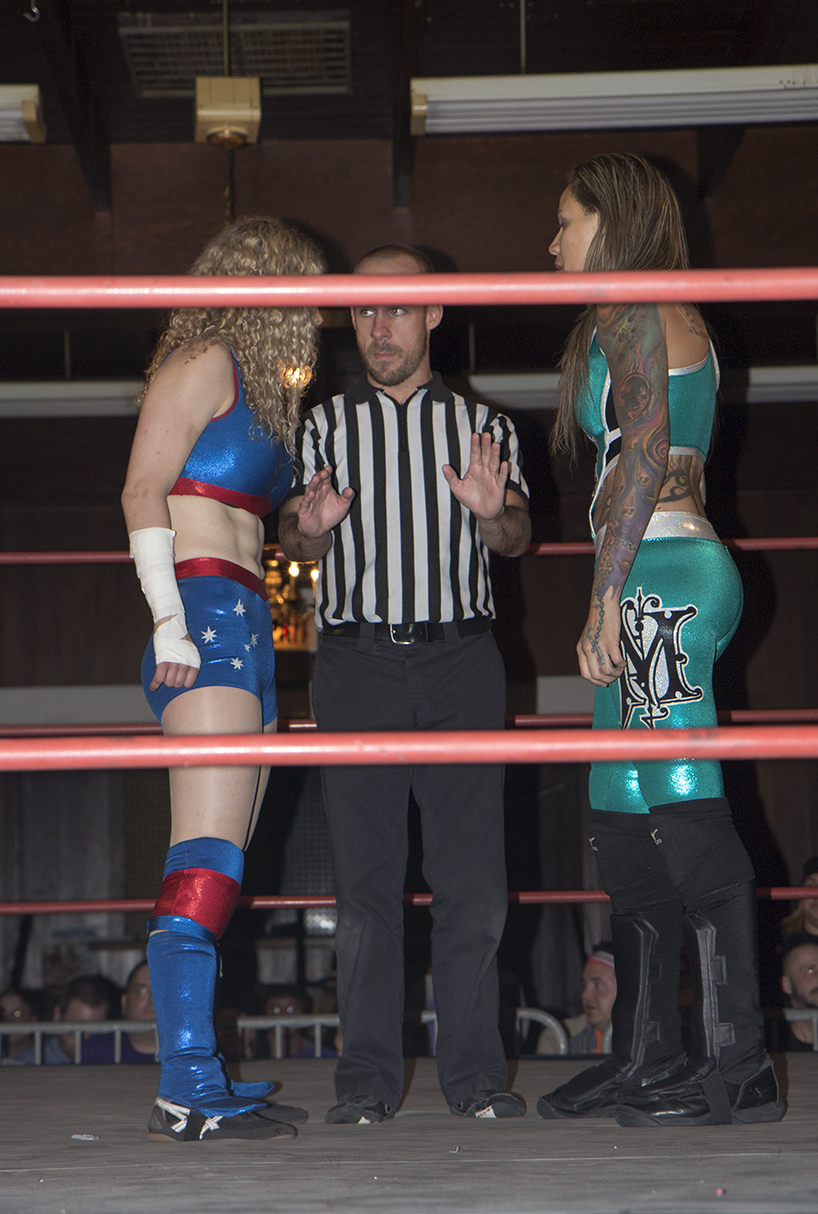
- The main event of Volume 90 was Kellie Skater vs. Mercedes Martinez for the SHIMMER Championship
- Promotion: Shimmer Women Athletes
- Date: November 13, 2016
- City: Berwyn, Illinois
- Venue: Berwyn Eagles Club

No.	Results	Stipulations
1	Marti Belle defeated Sonya Strong	Singles match
2	Samantha Heights defeated Nevaeh	Singles match
3	Melanie Cruise defeated Kiera Hogan	Singles match
4	Cherry Bomb defeated Leva Bates	Singles match
5	LuFisto defeated Solo Darling	Singles match
6	Kay Lee Ray defeated Nixon Newell	Singles match
7	Mount Tessa (Tessa Blanchard and Vanessa Kraven) (c) defeated BaleSpin (K. C. Spinelli and Xandra Bale)	Tag team match for the Shimmer Tag Team Championship
8	Mia Yim defeated Allysin Kay and Evie and Kimber Lee	Four-way match
9	Shayna Baszler defeated Heidi Lovelace	Singles match
10	Saraya Knight defeated Nicole Matthews	Bunkhouse Brawl match
11	Mercedes Martinez defeated Kellie Skater (c)	Singles match for the Shimmer Championship
(c) / – the champion(s) heading into the match

== Volume 91 ==
Shimmer Women Athletes Volume 91
- Promotion: Shimmer Women Athletes
- Date: April 1, 2017
- City: Fern Park, Florida
- Venue: Orlando Live Events Center

No.	Results	Stipulations	Times
1	Cherry Bomb defeated Alex Windsor	Singles match	7:35
2	Britt Baker defeated Veda Scott, Nevaeh and Samantha Heights	Four-way match	8:50
3	LuFisto defeated Leva Bates	Singles match	8:55
4	Shayna Baszler defeated Santana Garrett by submission	Singles match	6:20
5	Jessicka Havok defeated Cat Power	Singles match	6:45
6	Nicole Matthews defeated Shotzi Blackheart	Singles match	10:25
7	Mount Tessa (Tessa Blanchard and Vanessa Kraven) (c) defeated Fly High WDSS (Mia Yim and Kay Lee Ray)	Tag team match for the Shimmer Tag Team Championship	13:10
8	Dulce Garcia defeated Kellyanne	Singles match	11:57
9	Mercedes Martinez (c) (with Nicole Savoy) defeated Candice LeRae	Singles match for the Shimmer Championship	12:22
(c) / – the champion(s) heading into the match

== Volume 92 ==
Shimmer Women Athletes Volume 92
- Promotion: Shimmer Women Athletes
- Date: July 8, 2017
- City: Berwyn, Illinois
- Venue: Berwyn Eagles Club

No.	Results	Stipulations
1	Thunderkitty defeated Charli Evans	Singles match
2	Allysin Kay defeated Samantha Heights	Singles match
3	Ashley Lane defeated Taeler Hendrix	Singles match
4	Cheerleader Melissa defeated Savannah Evans	Singles match
5	Shotzi Blackheart (c) defeated Hudson Envy	Singles match for the Phoenix of Rise Championship
6	Cat Power defeated Nicole Matthews, Delilah Doom, and Leva Bates	Fatal four-way match
7	Fire and Nice (Britt Baker and Chelsea Green) defeated Paradise Lost (Courtney Rush and Angel Dust)	Tag team match
8	Deonna Purrazzo defeated Cherry Bomb	Singles match
9	Lufisto defeated K. C. Spinelli	Singles match
10	Mount Tessa (Tessa Blanchard and Vanessa Kraven) (c) defeated Fly High WDSS (Mia Yim and Kay Lee Ray)	Tag team match for the Shimmer Tag Team Championship
11	Madison Eagles, Shazza McKenzie, and Saraya Knight defeated Trifecta (Mercedes Martinez, Nicole Savoy and Shayna Baszler)	Six-woman tag team match
(c) / – the champion(s) heading into the match

== Volume 93 ==
Shimmer Women Athletes Volume 93
- Promotion: Shimmer Women Athletes
- Date: July 8, 2017
- City: Berwyn, Illinois
- Venue: Berwyn Eagles Club

No.	Results	Stipulations
1	Veda Scott defeated Ashley Lane	Singles match
2	Delilah Doom and Leva Bates defeated Blue Nation (Jessica Troy and Charli Evans)	Tag team match
3	Nicole Matthews defeated Samantha Heights	Singles match
4	Hudson Envy defeated Deonna Purrazzo	Singles match
5	Shotzi Blackheart defeated Cheerleader Melissa	Singles match
6	Courtney Rush defeated Britt Baker	Singles match
7	Madison Eagles defeated Shayna Baszler (with Nicole Savoy)	Singles match
8	Mia Yim defeated Kay Lee Ray	Singles match to determine the Number one contender for the Shimmer Championship
9	Mount Tessa (Tessa Blanchard and Vanessa Kraven) (c) defeated The Killer Death Machines (Jessicka Havok and Nevaeh)	Tag team match for the Shimmer Tag Team Championship
10	Shazza McKenzie defeated Nicole Savoy (c) (with Shayna Baszler)	Singles match for the Heart of Shimmer Championship
11	Mercedes Martinez (c) defeated Saraya Knight	Singles match for the Shimmer Championship
(c) / – the champion(s) heading into the match

== Volume 94 ==
Shimmer Women Athletes Volume 94
- Promotion: Shimmer Women Athletes
- Date: July 9, 2017
- City: Berwyn, Illinois
- Venue: Berwyn Eagles Club

No.	Results	Stipulations
1^{D}	Aja Perera defeated Laynie Luck	Singles match
2^{D}	Dementia D'Rose defeated Valentina Loca	Singles match
3^{D}	Stefany Sinclair defeated Jewells Malone by submission	Singles match
4	Allysin Kay vs. Nevaeh ended in no contest	Singles match
5	Jessicka Havok defeated Kikyo	Singles match
6	Cheerleader Melissa defeated Samantha Heights	Singles match
7	Cherry Bomb defeated Angel Dust and Kay Lee Ray and Taeler Hendrix	Fatal four-way match
8	Ashley Lane defeated Veda Scott	Singles match
9	Allysin Kay defeated Dynamite DiDi	Singles match
10	LuFisto defeated Shotzi Blackheart (with Thunderkitty)	Singles match
11	Nicole Matthews defeated Deonna Purrazzo	Singles match
12	Fire And Nice (Britt Baker and Chelsea Green) defeated Mount Tessa (Tessa Blanchard and Vanessa Kraven) (c) by disqualification	Tag team match for the Shimmer Tag Team Championship
13	Shayna Baszler defeated K. C. Spinelli by submission	Singles match
14	Madison Eagles defeated Nicole Savoy	Singles match
15	Shazza McKenzie (c) defeated Courtney Rush	Singles match for the Heart of Shimmer Championship
16	Mercedes Martinez (c) defeated Mia Yim by submission	Singles match for the Shimmer Championship
(c) / – the champion(s) heading into the match; D / – this was a dark match

== Volume 95 ==
Shimmer Women Athletes Volume 95
- Promotion: Shimmer Women Athletes
- Date: July 9, 2017
- City: Berwyn, Illinois
- Venue: Berwyn Eagles Club

No.	Results	Stipulations
1	Shotzi Blackheart defeated Veda Scott by submission	Singles match
2	Samantha Heights defeated Jessica Troy	Singles match
3	Cheerleader Melissa defeated K. C. Spinelli	Singles match
4	Jessicka Havok defeated Charli Evans	Singles match
5	Solo Darling defeated LuFisto by disqualification	Singles match
6	Hudson Envy defeated Mia Yim	Singles match
7	Saraya Knight defeated Cat Power by submission	Singles match
8	Nicole Savoy defeated Deonna Purrazzo by submission	Singles match
9	Mount Tessa (Tessa Blanchard and Vanessa Kraven) (c) defeated Fire And Nice (Britt Baker and Chelsea Green) and Paradise Lost (Angel Dust and Courtney Rush) and Delilah Doom and Leva Bates	Four-way elimination match for the Shimmer Tag Team Championship
10	Shazza McKenzie (c) defeated Nicole Matthews	Singles match for the Heart of Shimmer Championship
11	Mercedes Martinez (c) (with Nicole Savoy and Shayna Baszler) defeated Madison Eagles	Singles match for the Shimmer Championship
(c) / – the champion(s) heading into the match

== Volume 96 ==
Shimmer Women Athletes Volume 96
- Promotion: Shimmer Women Athletes
- Date: November 11, 2017
- City: Berwyn, Illinois
- Venue: Berwyn Eagles Club

No.	Results	Stipulations
1	ACR and Valentine Loca defeated Hawlee Layne and Samara	Tag team match
2	Kylie Rae and Miranda Salinas defeated Karen Q and Ray Lyn	Tag team match
3	Kikyo Nakamura defeated Heather Monroe	Singles match
4	Rachael Ellering defeated Zoe Lucas	Singles match
5	The Hottest Free Agents (Ashley Lane and Deonna Purrazzo) defeated Blue Nation (Charli Evans and Jessica Troy)	Tag team match
6	Kellyanne defeated Britt Baker, Ivelisse, Kiera Hogan, Samantha Heights and Shotzi Blackheart	6-way Scramble match
7	Saraya Knight defeated Marti Belle	Singles match
8	Tessa Blanchard (with Vanessa Kraven) defeated Candice LaRae	Singles match
9	Mia Yim defeated Aoi Kizuki	Singles match
10	Solo Darling and Thunderkitty defeated Hudson Envy and LuFisto	Tag team match
11	Delilah Doom defeated Vanessa Kraven (with Tessa Blanchard)	Singles match
12	Shazza McKenzie (c) defeated Cheerleader Melissa	Singles match for the Heart of Shimmer Championship
13	Hikaru Shida defeated Nicole Savoy	Singles match
14	Mercedes Martinez (c) defeated Jessicka Havok (with Nevaeh)	Singles match for the Shimmer Championship
(c) / – the champion(s) heading into the match

== Volume 97 ==
Shimmer Women Athletes Volume 97
- Promotion: Shimmer Women Athletes
- Date: November 11, 2017
- City: Berwyn, Illinois
- Venue: Berwyn Eagles Club

No.	Results	Stipulations
1	Aoi Kizuki defeated Veda Scott	Singles match
2	Paradise Lost (Courtney Rush and Dust) defeated The Sinister Sweethearts (Brittany Blake and Samantha Heights)	Tag team match
3	Britt Baker defeated Zoe Lucas	Singles match
4	LuFisto defeated Rachael Ellering	Singles match
5	Candice LaRae defeated Charli Evans (with Jessica Troy)	Singles match
6	Hiroyo Matsumoto defeated Hudson Envy	Singles match
7	Cheerleader Melissa defeated Chelsea Green	Singles match
8	Nicole Savoy defeated Saraya Knight	Singles match
9	Totally Tubular Tag Team (Delilah Doom and Leva Bates) defeated Mount Tessa (Tessa Blanchard and Vanessa Kraven) (c)	Tag team match for the Shimmer Tag Team Championship
10	Shazza McKenzie (c) defeated Kellyanne	Singles match for the Heart of Shimmer Championship
11	Aja Kong defeated Mia Yim	Singles match
12	Mercedes Martinez (c) defeated Hikaru Shida	Singles match for the Shimmer Championship
(c) / – the champion(s) heading into the match

== Volume 98 ==
Shimmer Women Athletes Volume 98
- Promotion: Shimmer Women Athletes
- Date: November 12, 2017
- City: Berwyn, Illinois
- Venue: Berwyn Eagles Club

No.	Results	Stipulations
1	Cherry Layne and Trixie Tash defeated Hyan and Jewells Malone	Tag team match
2	Heather Monroe defeated Kylie Rae	Singles match
3	Tessa Blanchard defeated Indi Hartwell	Singles match
4	Jessicka Havok defeated Zoe Lucas	Singles match
5	The Blue Nation (Charli Evans and Jessica Troy) defeated Solo Darling and Thunderkitty	Tag team match
6	Cheerleader Melissa defeated Rachael Ellering	Singles match
7	Totally Tubular Tag Team (Delilah Doom and Leva Bates) (c) defeated The Hottest Free Agents (Ashley Lane and Deonna Purrazzo)	Tag team match for the Shimmer Tag Team Championship
8	Aoi Kizuki defeated Chelsea Green	Singles match
9	Saraya Knight defeated Ivelisse	Singles match
10	Veda Scott defeated Shotzi Blackheart, Candice LaRae and Dust	Fatal four-way match
11	Mia Yim defeated Courtney Rush	Singles match
12	Kellyanne defeated Hiroyo Matsumoto	Singles match
13	Vanessa Kraven defeated Tessa Blanchard by countout	Singles match
14	Shazza McKenzie (c) and Allysin Kay ended in a no contest	Singles match for the Heart of Shimmer Championship
15	Aja Kong and Mercedes Martinez defeated Hikaru Shida and Nicole Savoy	Tag team match
(c) / – the champion(s) heading into the match

== Volume 99 ==
Shimmer Women Athletes Volume 99
- Promotion: Shimmer Women Athletes
- Date: November 12, 2017
- City: Berwyn, Illinois
- Venue: Berwyn Eagles Club

No.	Results	Stipulations
1	Candice LaRae defeated Jessica Troy	Singles match
2	Shotzi Blackheart defeated Heather Monroe	Singles match
3	LuFisto and Hudson Envy defeated The Sinister Sweethearts (Brittany Blake and Samantha Heights)	Tag team match
4	Deonna Purrazzo defeated Kiera Hogan, Mia Yim and Marti Belle	Fatal four-way match
5	Shazza McKenzie (c) defeated Veda Scott	Singles match for the Heart of Shimmer Championship
6	Fire and Nice (Britt Baker and Chelsea Green) defeated Aoi Kizuki and Hiroyo Matsumoto	Tag team match
7	Hikaru Shida defeated Cheerleader Melissa	Singles match
8	Totally Tubular Tag Team (Delilah Doom and Leva Bates) defeated Paradise Lost (Courtney Rush and Dust)	Tag team match for the Shimmer Tag Team Championship
9	Kellyanne defeated Jessicka Havok	Singles match
10	Vanessa Kraven defeated Tessa Blanchard	Lumberjack match
11	Nicole Savoy defeated Mercedes Martinez (c)	Singles match for the Shimmer Championship
(c) / – the champion(s) heading into the match

== Volume 100 ==
Shimmer Women Athletes Volume 100
- Promotion: Shimmer Women Athletes
- Date: April 7, 2018
- City: Kenner, Louisiana
- Venue: Pontchartrain Center

No.	Results	Stipulations	Times
1	Team Blue Nation (Charli Evans and Jessica Troy) defeated Fire And Nice (Britt Baker and Chelsea Green)	Tag team match	7:15
2	Mia Yim, Kay Lee Ray and Rhia O’Reilly defeated Kellyanne, Veda Scott and Zoe Lucas	Six-woman tag team match	15:10
3	Kimber Lee defeated Samantha Heights	Singles match	7:10
4	Totally Tubular Tag Team (Delilah Doom and Leva Bates) (c) defeated Hudson Envy and LuFisto	Tag team match for the Shimmer Tag Team Championship	9:25
5	Cheerleader Melissa defeated Shotzi Blackheart	Singles match	7:25
6	Madison Eagles defeated Deonna Purrazzo	Singles match	11:01
7	Toni Storm defeated Nicole Matthews by submission	Singles match	12:22
8	Shazza McKenzie (c) defeated Tessa Blanchard	Singles match for the Heart of Shimmer Championship	12:14
9	Nicole Savoy (c) defeated Mercedes Martinez by submission	Singles match for the Shimmer Championship	13:02
(c) / – the champion(s) heading into the match

== Volume 101 ==
Shimmer Women Athletes Volume 101
- Promotion: Shimmer Women Athletes
- Date: April 14, 2018
- City: Berwyn, Illinois
- Venue: Berwyn Eagles Club

No.	Results	Stipulations
1^{D}	Dementia D'Rose and Nina Monet defeated Tesha Price and Queen Aminata	Tag team match
2^{D}	FaceBrooke defeated Ray Lyn	Singles match
3	Zoe Lucas defeated Aerial Monroe	Singles match
4	Samantha Heights defeated Sierra	Singles match
5	Hudson Envy defeated Dynamite DiDi, Kay Lee Ray and Miranda Alize	Four-way match
6	Rachael Ellering defeated Veda Scott	Singles match
7	Dust (with Rosemary) defeated Rhia O'Reilly	Singles match
8	Marti Belle defeated Brittany Blake	Singles match
9	The Totally Tubular Tag Team (Delilah Doom and Leva Bates) (c) defeated The Blue Nation (Charli Evans and Jessica Troy)	Tag team match for the Shimmer Tag Team Championship
10	Mercedes Martinez defeated Willow Nightingale by submission	Singles match
11	Shazza McKenzie (c) defeated Shotzi Blackheart	Singles match for the Heart of Shimmer Championship
12	Mia Yim defeated Nicole Matthews	Singles match
13	Deonna Purrazzo defeated Madison Eagles by submission	Submission match
14	Nicole Savoy (c) defeated Cheerleader Melissa by submission	Singles match for the Shimmer Championship
(c) / – the champion(s) heading into the match; D / – this was a dark match

== Volume 102 ==
Shimmer Women Athletes Volume 102
- Promotion: Shimmer Women Athletes
- Date: April 14, 2018
- City: Berwyn, Illinois
- Venue: Berwyn Eagles Club

No.	Results	Stipulations
1	Zoe Lucas defeated Leva Bates	Singles match
2	Paradise Lost (Dust and Melanie Cruise) (with Rosemary) defeated Rhia O'Reilly and Saraya Knight	Tag team match
3	Shazza McKenzie (c) defeated Hudson Envy by submission	Singles match for the Heart of Shimmer Championship
4	Cheerleader Melissa defeated FaceBrooke	Singles match
5	Gokumon-to (Dynamite DiDi and Kikyo) defeated The Killer Death Machines (Jessicka Havok and Nevaeh)	Tag team match
6	Kay Lee Ray defeated LuFisto by disqualification	Singles match
7	Madison Eagles defeated Kiera Hogan	Singles match
8	Kris Wolf defeated Charli Evans, Mia Yim and Shotzi Blackheart	Four-way match
9	Kimber Lee defeated Delilah Doom	Singles match
10	Mercedes Martinez defeated Vanessa Kraven	Singles match
11	Nicole Savoy (c) defeated Deonna Purrazzo by submission	Singles match for the Shimmer Championship
(c) / – the champion(s) heading into the match

== Volume 103 ==
Shimmer Women Athletes Volume 103
- Promotion: Shimmer Women Athletes
- Date: April 15, 2018
- City: Berwyn, Illinois
- Venue: Berwyn Eagles Club

No.	Results	Stipulations
1^{D}	Cici Galavis defeated Harlow O'Hara	Singles match
2^{D}	Karen Q (with Ray Lyn) defeated Tesha Price by submission	Singles match
3	Chelsea Green defeated Jessica Troy	Singles match
4	Cheerleader Melissa defeated Aerial Monroe	Singles match
5	Willow Nightingale defeated Sierra	Singles match
6	Undeniably Impressive (Indi Hartwell and Tessa Blanchard) defeated The Sinister Sweethearts (Brittany Blake and Samantha Heights)	Tag team match
7	Saraya Knight defeated Hyan	Singles match
8	Kris Wolf defeated Kiera Hogan	Singles match
9	Dust (with Rosemary) defeated Britt Baker	Singles match
10	The Totally Tubular Tag Team (Delilah Doom and Leva Bates) (c) defeated Gokumon-to (Dynamite DiDi and Kikyo)	Tag team match for the Shimmer Tag Team Championship
11	Nicole Matthews defeated Rachael Ellering	Singles match
12	Hudson Envy and LuFisto defeated Fly High WDSS (Kay Lee Ray and Mia Yim)	Tag team match
13	Shazza McKenzie (c) defeated Zoe Lucas by submission	Singles match for the Heart of Shimmer Championship
14	Kimber Lee defeated Mercedes Martinez, Rhia O'Reilly and Vanessa Kraven	Four-way match
15	Nicole Savoy (c) defeated Su Yung by submission	Singles match for the Shimmer Championship
(c) / – the champion(s) heading into the match; D / – this was a dark match

== Volume 104 ==
Shimmer Women Athletes Volume 104
- Promotion: Shimmer Women Athletes
- Date: April 15, 2018
- City: Berwyn, Illinois
- Venue: Berwyn Eagles Club

No.	Results	Stipulations
1	Veda Scott defeated Samantha Heights	Singles match
2	The Killer Death Machines (Jessicka Havok and Nevaeh) defeated The Blue Nation (Charli Evans and Jessica Troy)	Tag team match
3	Melanie Cruise (with Rosemary) defeated Willow Nightingale	Singles match
4	Tessa Blanchard defeated Miranda Alize	Singles match
5	Saraya Knight defeated Rain (with Lacey)	Singles match
6	Cheerleader Melissa defeated Leva Bates	Singles match
7	Nicole Matthews defeated Kris Wolf	Singles match
8	Shotzi Blackheart defeated Britt Baker, Chelsea Green, Marti Belle, Rachael Ellering and Su Yung	Six-way Scramble match
9	Vanessa Kraven defeated Mercedes Martinez	Singles match
10	Dust (with Rosemary) defeated Shazza McKenzie (c) (with Kellie Skater)	Singles match for the Heart of Shimmer Championship
11	Fly High WDSS (Kay Lee Ray and Mia Yim) defeated Hudson Envy and LuFisto	Tornado tag team match
12	Nicole Savoy (c) defeated Kimber Lee	Singles match for the Shimmer Championship
(c) / – the champion(s) heading into the match

== Volume 105 ==
Shimmer Women Athletes Volume 105
- Promotion: Shimmer Women Athletes
- Date: October 20, 2018
- City: Berwyn, Illinois
- Venue: Berwyn Eagles Club

No.	Results	Stipulations
1^{D}	Rachael Ellering defeated Karen Q	Singles match
2	The Blue Nation (Charli Evans and Jessica Troy) defeated Team Sea Stars (Ashley Vox and Delmi Exo)	Tag team match
3	Britt Baker defeated Sierra	Singles match
4	Veda Scott defeated Delilah Doom	Singles match
5	Samantha Heights defeated Kiera Hogan	Singles match
6	Jinny defeated Shotzi Blackheart	Singles match
7	Kimber Lee defeated Indi Hartwell and Shazza McKenzie	Three-way match
8	Dust (c) (with Rosemary) defeated Ashley Lane	Singles match for the Heart of Shimmer Championship
9	Viper defeated Kay Lee Ray	Singles match to determine the #1 contender for the Shimmer Championship
10	Nicole Savoy (c) defeated Cheerleader Melissa, Mercedes Martinez and Vanessa Kraven	Four-way elimination match for the Shimmer Championship
(c) / – the champion(s) heading into the match; D / – this was a dark match

== Volume 106 ==
Shimmer Women Athletes Volume 106
- Promotion: Shimmer Women Athletes
- Date: October 20, 2018
- City: Berwyn, Illinois
- Venue: Berwyn Eagles Club

No.	Results	Stipulations
1	K. C. Spinelli defeated Holidead	Singles match
2	The Blue Nation (Charli Evans and Jessica Troy) defeated The Killer Death Machines (Jessicka Havok and Nevaeh)	Tag team match to determine the #1 contenders for the Shimmer Tag Team Championship
3	Solo Darling defeated Sierra	Singles match
4	Willow Nightingale defeated Dynamite DiDi	Singles match
5	LuFisto defeated Shazza McKenzie	Singles match
6	Samantha Heights defeated Zoe Lucas	Singles match
7	Kay Lee Ray defeated Hyan	Singles match
8	The Totally Tubular Tag Team (Delilah Doom and Leva Bates) (c) vs. Cheerleader Melissa and Mercedes Martinez ended in no contest	Tag team match for the Shimmer Tag Team Championship
9	Dust (c) (with Rosemary) defeated Rachael Ellering	Singles match for the Heart of Shimmer Championship
10	Nicole Savoy (c) defeated Viper	Singles match for the Shimmer Championship
(c) / – the champion(s) heading into the match

== Volume 107 ==
Shimmer Women Athletes Volume 107
- Promotion: Shimmer Women Athletes
- Date: October 21, 2018
- City: Berwyn, Illinois
- Venue: Berwyn Eagles Club

No.	Results	Stipulations
1^{D}	Queen Aminata defeated Layne Rosario	Singles match
2^{D}	Dementia D'Rose defeated Trixie Tash	Singles match
3	Holidead defeated Thunderkitty	Singles match
4	Vanessa Kraven defeated Dynamite DiDi	Singles match
5	Hyan defeated Solo Darling	Singles match
6	Kay Lee Ray defeated Britt Baker, Kiera Hogan and Shotzi Blackheart	Four-way match
7	Willow Nightingale defeated Zoe Lucas	Singles match
8	Dust (c) (with Rosemary) defeated Samantha Heights	Singles match for the Heart of Shimmer Championship
9	Shazza McKenzie defeated Jinny	Singles match
10	Cheerleader Melissa and Mercedes Martinez defeated The Totally Tubular Tag Team (Delilah Doom and Leva Bates) (c), The Blue Nation (Charli Evans and Jessica Troy) and The Killer Death Machines (Jessicka Havok and Nevaeh)	Four-way tag team elimination match for the Shimmer Tag Team Championship
11	K. C. Spinelli defeated Veda Scott	Singles match
12	Team Sea Stars (Ashley Vox and Delmi Exo) defeated Undeniably Impressive (Indi Hartwell and Tessa Blanchard)	Tag team match
13	Nicole Savoy (c) defeated LuFisto	Singles match for the Shimmer Championship
(c) / – the champion(s) heading into the match; D / – this was a dark match

== Volume 108 ==
Shimmer Women Athletes Volume 108
- Promotion: Shimmer Women Athletes
- Date: October 21, 2018
- City: Berwyn, Illinois
- Venue: Berwyn Eagles Club

No.	Results	Stipulations
1	Sierra defeated Allie Kat	Singles match
2	Kiera Hogan defeated Solo Darling	Singles match
3	Shotzi Blackheart defeated Hyan	Singles match
4	Jinny defeated Leva Bates	Singles match
5	Zoe Lucas defeated Ashley Vox	Singles match
6	Britt Baker defeated Indi Hartwell by submission	Singles match
7	Dust (c) (with Rosemary) defeated Willow Nightingale	Singles match for the Heart of Shimmer Championship
8	Tessa Blanchard defeated Kay Lee Ray	Singles match
9	Nicole Savoy, Shazza McKenzie, Vanessa Kraven and Viper defeated Cheerleader Melissa, Kimber Lee, LuFisto and Mercedes Martinez	Eight-woman tag team match
(c) / – the champion(s) heading into the match

== Volume 109 ==
Shimmer Women Athletes Volume 109
- Promotion: Shimmer Women Athletes
- Date: March 30, 2019
- City: Berwyn, Illinois
- Venue: Berwyn Eagles Club

No.	Results	Stipulations
1^{D}	Rok-C and Session Moth Martina defeated Jenna Lynn defeated Phoebe	Tag team match
2	Sierra defeated Thunderkitty	Singles match
3	Shazza McKenzie defeated Alisha Edwards by submission	Singles match
4	Indi Hartwell (with Steph De Lander) defeated Allie Kat	Singles match
5	Shotzi Blackheart defeated AQA, Hyan, Kiera Hogan, Penelope Ford and Miranda Alize	Six-way match
6	Dash Chisako and Hiroyo Matsumoto defeated The Blue Nation (Charli Evans and Jessica Troy)	Tag team match
7	Solo Darling defeated Zoe Lucas by submission	Singles match
8	Hudson Envy defeated Aerial Monroe, Kimber Lee and Kris Wolf	Four Corners match
9	Dust (c) (with Rosemary) defeated Leva Bates	Singles match for the Heart of Shimmer Championship
10	Cheerleader Melissa and Mercedes Martinez (c) defeated The Sea Stars (Ashley Vox and Delmi Exo)	Tag team match for the Shimmer Tag Team Championship
11	Nicole Savoy (c) defeated Britt Baker by submission	Singles match for the Shimmer Championship
(c) / – the champion(s) heading into the match; D / – this was a dark match

== Volume 110 ==
Shimmer Women Athletes Volume 110
- Promotion: Shimmer Women Athletes
- Date: March 30, 2019
- City: Berwyn, Illinois
- Venue: Berwyn Eagles Club

No.	Results	Stipulations
1	Charli Evans defeated Cherry	Singles match
2	Hyan defeated Aerial Monroe	Singles match
3	Jessicka Havok defeated Sonya Strong by submission	Singles match
4	Steph De Lander (with Indi Hartwell) defeated Brittany Blake, Nevaeh and Veda Scott	Four Corners match
5	Su Yung defeated Shotzi Blackheart	Singles match
6	Dust (c) (with Rosemary) defeated Solo Darling	Singles match for the Heart of Shimmer Championship
7	Dash Chisako and Hiroyo Matsumoto defeated The Twisted Sisterz (Holidead and Thunder Rosa)	Tag team match
8	Allysin Kay defeated Shazza McKenzie	Singles match
9	Rosemary (with Dust) defeated Samantha Heights	Singles match
10	Charlie Morgan defeated Mercedes Martinez	Singles match
11	Nicole Savoy (c) defeated Hudson Envy by submission	Singles match for the Shimmer Championship
(c) / – the champion(s) heading into the match

== Volume 111 ==
Shimmer Women Athletes Volume 111
- Promotion: Shimmer Women Athletes
- Date: March 31, 2019
- City: Berwyn, Illinois
- Venue: Berwyn Eagles Club

No.	Results	Stipulations
1^{P}	Harlow O’Hara defeated Rocky Radley	Singles match
2^{P}	Session Moth Martina defeated Big Mamma, Hawlee Cromwell, Jenna Lynn, Phoebe, Sloan and Valentina Loca	Battle royal
3	Cherry defeated Veda Scott	Singles match
4	Jessicka Havok (with Neveah) defeated Steph De Lander (with Indi Hartwell) by submission	Singles match
5	Jessica Troy (with Charli Evans) defeated AQA by submission	Singles match
6	Leva Bates defeated Delmi Exo, Miranda Alize and Zoe Lucas	Four-way match
7	Shotzi Blackheart defeated Sierra	Singles match
8	Shazza McKenzie defeated Thunder Rosa	Singles match
9	The Sinister Sweethearts (Brittany Blake and Samantha Heights) defeated Paradise Lost (Dust and Rosemary).	Tag team match
10	Kimber Lee defeated Charlie Morgan	Singles match
11	Dash Chisako and Hiroyo Matsumoto defeated Cheerleader Melissa and Mercedes Martinez (c) by disqualification	Tag team match for the Shimmer Tag Team Championship
12	Nicole Savoy (c) defeated Allysin Kay by submission	Singles match for the Shimmer Championship
(c) / – the champion(s) heading into the match; P / – the match was broadcast on the pre-show

== Volume 112 ==
Shimmer Women Athletes Volume 112
- Promotion: Shimmer Women Athletes
- Date: March 31, 2019
- City: Berwyn, Illinois
- Venue: Berwyn Eagles Club

No.	Results	Stipulations
1	Zoe Lucas defeated Penelope Ford	Singles match
2	Britt Baker defeated Kimber Lee by submission	Singles match
3	Twisted Sisterz (Holidead and Thunder Rosa) defeated Hyan and Miranda Alize	Tag team match
4	Cheerleader Melissa defeated Solo Darling	Singles match
5	Dash Chisako defeated Ashley Vox, Cherry and Kiera Hogan	Four-way match
6	Hiroyo Matsumoto defeated Su Yung	Singles match
7	Kris Wolf and Charlie Morgan defeated Team Blue Nation (Charli Evans and Jessica Troy)	Tag team match
8	Samantha Heights (with Brittany Blake) defeated Dust (c) (with Rosemary) by disqualification	Singles match for the Heart of Shimmer Championship
9	Nicole Savoy (c) defeated Shazza McKenzie	Singles match for the Shimmer Championship
(c) / – the champion(s) heading into the match

== Volume 113 ==
Shimmer Women Athletes Volume 113
- Promotion: Shimmer Women Athletes
- Date: April 5, 2019
- City: Woodside, New York
- Venue: La Boom

No.	Results	Stipulations
1	Nicole Savoy (c) defeated Hiroyo Matsumoto	Singles match for the Shimmer Championship
2	Hyan defeated Allie Recks, Brandi Lauren, Brittany Blake, Indi Hartwell, Leva Bates, Shotzi Blackheart and Veda Scott	Eight-way match
3	Allysin Kay defeated Kris Stadtlander	Singles match
4	Shazza McKenzie defeated Su Yung	Singles match
5	Cheerleader Melissa and Mercedes Martinez (c) defeated The Twisted Sisters (Holidead and Thunder Rosa)	Tag team match for the Shimmer Tag Team Championship
6	Tessa Blanchard defeated Britt Baker	Singles match
7	Team Sea Stars (Ashley Vox and Delmi Exo), Kris Wolf and Solo Darling defeated Charli Evans, Jessica Troy, Steph De Lander and Zoe Lucas	Eight-woman tag team match
8	Samantha Heights defeated Dust (C)	Singles match for the Heart of Shimmer Championship
(c) / – the champion(s) heading into the match

== Volume 114 ==
Shimmer Women Athletes Volume 114
- Promotion: Shimmer Women Athletes
- Date: November 2, 2019
- City: Berwyn, Illinois
- Venue: Berwyn Eagles Club

No.	Results	Stipulations
1^{D}	Lady Frost defeated Jenna Lynn	Singles match
2	Kris Statlander defeated Marti Belle	Interim Heart of Shimmer Championship Tournament first round match
3	Charli Evans defeated Bel Pierce	Singles match
4	Team Sea Stars (Ashley Vox and Delmi Exo) defeated Davienne and Skylar	Tag team match
5	Hyan defeated Brittany Blake	Interim Heart of Shimmer Championship Tournament first round match
6	Kimber Lee defeated Nevaeh	Singles match
7	Saraya Knight defeated Ruby Raze	Singles match
8	Priscilla Kelly defeated Shazza McKenzie by submission	Singles match
9	KellyAnne defeated Allysin Kay, Jessicka Havok, Jessica Troy, Su Yung and Solo Darling	Six-way scramble match to determine the #1 contender for the Shimmer Championship at Volume 115
10	Shotzi Blackheart defeated Dust by submission	Singles match
11	Cheerleader Melissa and Mercedes Martinez defeated Big Swole and Nicole Savoy	Tag team match for the Shimmer Tag Team Championship
D / – this was a dark match

== Volume 115 ==
Shimmer Women Athletes Volume 115
- Promotion: Shimmer Women Athletes
- Date: November 2, 2019
- City: Berwyn, Illinois
- Venue: Berwyn Eagles Club

No.	Results	Stipulations
1	Jenna Lynn defeated Hawlee Cromwell	Singles match
2	Ruby Raze defeated Nevaeh	Singles match
3	Shazza McKenzie defeated Jody Threat	Singles match
4	Team Blue Nation (Charli Evans and Jessica Troy) defeated The Bird and the Bee (Solo Darling and Willow Nightingale) by submission	Tag team match
5	Rhia O’Reilly defeated Veda Scott	Interim Heart of Shimmer Championship Tournament first round match
6	Priscilla Kelly defeated Dust	Singles match
7	Thunderkitty defeated Lady Frost by submission	Singles match
8	Kimber Lee defeated Saraya Knight	Singles match
9	Shotzi Blackheart defeated Holidead	Singles match
10	Team Sea Stars (Ashley Vox and Delmi Exo) defeated Cheerleader Melissa and Mercedes Martinez (c)	Tag team match for the Shimmer Tag Team Championship
11	Nicole Savoy (c) defeated KellyAnne	Singles match for the Shimmer Championship
(c) / – the champion(s) heading into the match

== Volume 116 ==
Shimmer Women Athletes Volume 116
- Promotion: Shimmer Women Athletes
- Date: November 3, 2019
- City: Berwyn, Illinois
- Venue: Berwyn Eagles Club

No.	Results	Stipulations
1^{D}	Candy Lee defeated Jamie Senegal	Intergender match
2^{D}	Elayna Black defeated Sophie King	Singles match
3^{D}	Valentina Loca defeated Zan Phoenix	Singles match
4	Holidead defeated Veda Scott	Singles match
5	The Bird and the Bee (Solo Darling and Willow Nightingale) defeated The Top Dogs (Davienne and Skylar)	Tag team match
6	Su Yung defeated Thunderkitty	Singles match
7	Marti Belle defeated Shazza McKenzie	Singles match
8	Zoey Skye defeated Kellyanne	Singles match
9	Jessicka Havok defeated Ruby Raze	Singles match
10	Hyan defeated Kris Statlander and Rhia O'Reilly	Three-way elimination match to determine the interim Heart of Shimmer Championship
11	Mercedes Martinez defeated Big Swole	Singles match
12	Team Sea Stars (Ashley Vox and Delmi Exo) (c) defeated The Blue Nation (Charli Evans and Jessica Troy)	Tag team match for the Shimmer Tag Team Championship
13	Kimber Lee defeated Nicole Savoy (c), Priscilla Kelly and Shotzi Blackheart	Four-way elimination match for the Shimmer Championship
(c) / – the champion(s) heading into the match; D / – this was a dark match

== Volume 117 ==
Shimmer Women Athletes Volume 117
- Promotion: Shimmer Women Athletes
- Date: November 3, 2019
- City: Berwyn, Illinois
- Venue: Berwyn Eagles Club

No.	Results	Stipulations
1	Marti Belle defeated Bel Pierce	Singles match
2	Brittany Blake defeated Jody Threat	Singles match
3	Veda Scott defeated Laynie Luck	Singles match
4	Team Sea Stars (Ashley Vox and Delmi Exo) (c) defeated The Bird and the Bee (Solo Darling and Willow Nightingale)	Tag team match for the Shimmer Tag Team Championship
5	Saraya Knight defeated Davienne	Singles match
6	Allysin Kay defeated Rhia O'Reilly	Singles match
7	Shazza McKenzie defeated Cheerleader Melissa, Elayna Black, Kris Statlander, Nevaeh and Skylar	Scramble match
8	Hyan (c) defeated Holidead	Singles match for the Interim Heart of Shimmer Championship
9	Big Swole and Nicole Savoy defeated The Blue Nation (Charli Evans and Jessica Troy)	Tag team match
10	Zoey Skye defeated Mercedes Martinez	Singles match
11	Kimber Lee (c) defeated Jessicka Havok	Singles match for the Shimmer Championship
(c) / – the champion(s) heading into the match

== Shimmer at The Collective ==
Shimmer at The Collective
- Promotion: Shimmer Women Athletes
- Date: October 11, 2020
- City: Indianapolis, Indiana
- Venue: Marion County Fairgrounds

No.	Results	Stipulations
1	Nevaeh defeated Kenzie Paige	Singles match
2	Alice Crowley defeated Big Mama, Brittany Blake, Elayna Black, Jody Threat and Queen Aminata	Scramble match
3	Heather Monroe defeated Leyla Hirsch	Singles match
4	The Bird and the Bee (Solo Darling and Willow Nightingale) defeated Kayla Kassidy and Sierra by submission	Tag team match
5	Lacey Ryan defeated Davienne	Singles match
6	Hyan (c) defeated Thunderkitty	Singles match for the Heart of Shimmer Championship
7	Zoey Skye defeated Holidead	Singles match
8	Team Sea Stars (Ashley Vox and Delmi Exo) (c) defeated The Hex (Allysin Kay and Marti Belle)	Tag team match for the Shimmer Tag Team Championship
9	Kimber Lee (c) defeated Nicole Savoy	Singles match for the Shimmer Championship
(c) / – the champion(s) heading into the match

== Volume 119 ==
Shimmer Women Athletes Volume 119
- Promotion: Shimmer Women Athletes
- Date: October 31, 2021
- City: Berwyn, Illinois
- Venue: Eagles Club

No.	Results	Stipulations
1	Allysin Kay defeated Laynie Luck	Singles match
2	Team Sea Stars (Ashley Vox and Delmi Exo) (c) defeated Kayla Kassidy and Sierra	Tag team match for the Shimmer Tag Team Championship
3	Marti Belle defeated Alice Crowley	Singles match
4	Davienne defeated Brittany Blake	Singles match
5	Zoey Skye defeated Heather Monroe (with Ray Lyn)	Singles match
6	Charli Evans defeated Holidead	Singles match
7	Nicole Savoy defeated Janai Kai	Singles match
8	Nevaeh defeated Hyan (c)	Singles match for the Heart of Shimmer Championship
9	Mercedes Martinez defeated Jody Threat	Singles match
10	Kimber Lee (c) defeated Willow Nightingale	Singles match for the Shimmer Championship
(c) / – the champion(s) heading into the match

== Volume 120 ==
Shimmer Women Athletes Volume 120
- Promotion: Shimmer Women Athletes
- Date: October 31, 2021
- City: Berwyn, Illinois
- Venue: Eagles Club

No.	Results	Stipulations
1	Becca defeated Blair Onyx	Singles match
2	Thunderkitty defeated Skylar	Singles match
3	Veda Scott defeated Vipress	Singles match
4	Brittany Blake defeated Tesha Price	Singles match
5	Holidead defeated Sierra	Singles match
6	The Hex (Allysin Kay and Marti Belle) defeated Janai Kai and Nicole Savoy	Tag team match
7	Willow Nightingale defeated Hyan	Singles match
8	Mercedes Martinez defeated Charli Evans	Singles match
9	Nevaeh (c) defeated Davienne	Singles match for the Heart of Shimmer Championship
10	Team Sea Stars (Ashley Vox and Delmi Exo) (c) defeated Blonde Force Trauma (Heather Monroe and Ray Lyn)	Tag team match for the Shimmer Tag Team Championship
11	Zoey Skye defeated Kimber Lee (c)	Singles match for the Shimmer Championship
(c) / – the champion(s) heading into the match

== See also ==
- Shine Wrestling events
- List of NCW Femme Fatales events
