= ChickFight =

Former female wrestling federation

- Acronym: CF
- Founded: 2004
- Defunct: 2008
- Style: Women's professional wrestling
- Headquarters: San Francisco, California
- Founder(s): Jason Deadrich
- Website: ChickFight.tv

ChickFight was a women's professional wrestling promotion based in San Francisco, California.

== History ==
ChickFight originally began as an eight-woman tournament with the first one taking place on October 29, 2004, in Hayward, California as part of All Pro Wrestling's Halloween Hell weekend. In 2006, ChickFight moved to San Francisco, California and ran regularly at the Kezar Pavilion in San Francisco's Haight Ashbury district. In 2007, the tournament was moved to England. The promotion closed in 2008.

== Events ==
=== ChickFight I ===
- Date: October 29, 2004
- Location: APW Garage in Hayward, California

Quarterfinals
Princess Sugey | Pin
Candice LeRae
Nikki Roxx | Pin
Hailey Hatred
Cheerleader Melissa | Pin
Nene Kimura
Christie Ricci | Pin
Tiffany

Semifinals
Princess Sugey | Pin
Nikki Roxx
Cheerleader Melissa | Pin
Christie Ricci

Final
Princess Sugey | Steel
Cheerleader Melissa | Cage

=== ChickFight II ===
- Date: May 13, 2005
- Location: APW Garage in Hayward, California

Quarterfinals
Mariko Yoshida | Pin
Nene Kimura
Princess Sugey | Pin
Luscious
Cheerleader Melissa | Pin
Katwoman
Nikki T | Pin
Tiffany

Semifinals
Mariko Yoshida | Pin
Princess Sugey
Cheerleader Melissa | Pin
Tiffany

Final
Mariko Yoshida | Pin
Cheerleader Melissa

=== ChickFight III ===
- Date: October 29, 2005
- Location: APW Garage in Hayward, California

Quarterfinals
Mariko Yoshida | Pin
Rain
Rebecca Knox | Sub
Morgan
Mickie Knuckles | Pin
Tiffany
Cheerleader Melissa | Double
Sara Del Rey | DQ

Semifinals
Mariko Yoshida | Pin
Rebecca Knox
Mickie Knuckles | Pin
Hailey Hatred

Final
Mariko Yoshida | Pin
Mickie Knuckles

=== ChickFight IV ===
- Date: April 15, 2006
- Location: Kezar Pavilion in San Francisco, California

Quarterfinals
Mercedes Martinez | Pin
Carla Jade
Cheerleader Melissa | Pin
Rain
MsChif | Pin
Candice LeRae
Lacey | Pin
Hailey Hatred

Semifinals
Mercedes Martinez | Pin
Cheerleader Melissa
MsChif | Pin
Lacey

Final
Mercedes Martinez | Pin
MsChif

=== ChickFight V ===
- Date: June 24, 2006
- Location: Kezar Pavilion in San Francisco, California

Quarterfinals
Cheerleader Melissa | Pin
Tanny Mouse
Yoshiko Tamura | Pin
Allison Danger
Jazz | Pin
Simply Luscious
MsChif | Pin
Sumie Sakai

Semifinals
Cheerleader Melissa | Pin
Yoshiko Tamura
Jazz | Pin
MsChif

Final (Falls Count Anywhere)
Cheerleader Melissa | Pin
Jazz

=== ChickFight VI ===
- Date: September 1, 2006
- Location: Kezar Pavilion in San Francisco, California

Quarterfinals
MsChif | Pin
Hailey Hatred
Kaoru | KO
Tiana Ringer
Allison Danger | Pin
Frankie
Cheerleader Melissa | Draw
Daizee Haze | 35:00

Semifinals
MsChif
Kaoru | Pin
Cheerleader Melissa; Allison Danger
Daizee Haze | Pin

Final
Kaoru
Daizee Haze | Pin

=== ChickFight VII: The UK vs The USA ===
- Date: January 14, 2007
- Location: The Marina Centre in Great Yarmouth, Norfolk

Quarterfinals
Cheerleader Melissa | Ref
Sweet Saraya | Stoppage
MsChif | Pin
Jade
Eden Black | Sub
Lacey
Skye
Daizee Haze | Pin

Semifinals
Cheerleader Melissa | Pin
MsChif
Eden Black | Sub
Daizee Haze

Final
Cheerleader Melissa | Pin
Eden Black

Non-Tournament Match

- Destiny and Kharisma defeated The Norfolk Dolls (Britani and Melodi)

=== ChickFight VIII ===
- Date: April 22, 2007
- Location: Liquid Nightclub in Gloucester, Gloucestershire

Quarterfinals
Wesna | Pin
Pandora
Jade | DQ
Violet
MsChif | Pin
Kelly Adams
Skye
Jetta | Pin

Semifinals
Wesna | Pin
Jade
MsChif | Sub
Jetta

Final
Wesna | Pin
MsChif

Non-Tournament Matches

- Cheerleader Melissa defeated "The Jezebel" Eden Black by knockout to become the first Trans-Atlantic Women's champion
- Pandora defeated Bubbles
- Cheerleader Melissa defeated Wesna to retain the Trans-Atlantic Women's Championship

=== ChickFight IX: Our Final Chance ===
- Date: June 17, 2007
- Location: Orpington Halls in Orpington, Kent

Quarterfinals
Blue Nikita | Pin
Jetta
Amazing Kong | Bye
Sweet Saraya
Eden Black | Pin
Jade
Skye | No
Bubbles | Contest^{2}

Semifinals
Blue Nikita
Amazing Kong | Pin
Eden Black | BYE

Final
Amazing Kong | Pin
Eden Black

1. Kong received a bye after her scheduled opponent, Sweet Saraya, could not compete due to injury.
2. Match ended when Cheerleader Melissa attacked both wrestlers, neither advanced.

Non-Tournament Match

- Wesna drew with Cheerleader Melissa (45:00), Wesna retains the RQW Women's Championship

=== ChickFight IX.5 ===
- Date: August 26, 2007
- Location: The Suncastle in Skegness, Lincolnshire

Episode 1

| # | Results | Stipulations | Times |
|---|---|---|---|
| 1 | Jade and Blue Nikita fought to a no contest | Singles match | N/A |
| 2 | Jetta defeated Skye 2-0 | Two out of three falls match | N/A |
| 3 | Bubbles defeated Cheerleader Melissa | Singles match | N/A |
| 4 | Wesna (c) defeated Eden Black by DQ | Singles match for the RQW Women's Championship | N/A |

The first match was declared a no contest after Cheerleader Melissa attacked both Jade and Blue Nikita.
The RQW Women's Championship match ended in disqualification when Jetta made it appear as if Eden Black had used a weapon leading to a grudge match.

Episode 2

| # | Results | Stipulations | Times |
|---|---|---|---|
| 1 | Wesna (c) defeated Bubbles, Jade and Skye | Four Corners elimination match for the RQW Women's Championship | N/A |
| 2 | Jetta defeated Eden Black | Singles match | N/A |
| 3 | Cheerleader Melissa defeated Blue Nikita | Singles match | N/A |

=== ChickFight X ===
- Date: May 4, 2008
- Location: The Caribbean Centre in Ipswich, Suffolk

Episode 1

| # | Results | Stipulations | Times |
|---|---|---|---|
| 1 | Cheerleader Melissa defeated Wesna | Singles match | 20:23 |
| 2 | Jetta defeated Becky James | Singles match | 09:31 |
| 3 | Team Blossom (Holly & Hannah) defeated Jade & Maya | Tag team match | 10:22 |
| 4 | Wesna defeated Bubbles | Singles match | 09:18 |

Episode 2

| # | Results | Stipulations | Times |
|---|---|---|---|
| 1 | Cheerleader Melissa defeated Jetta by DQ | Singles match | 12:56 |
| 2 | Jade defeated Becky James | Singles match | 06:53 |
| 3 | Bubbles defeated Maya | Singles match | 03:27 |
| 4 | Faith Lehaine defeated Skarlett Venom and Chrissy V | Three-way match | 05:06 |
| 5 | Wesna defeated Cheerleader Melissa | Singles match | 19:45 |

Jetta was disqualified when Wesna interfered in the match, preventing Cheerleader Melissa from applying the Kudo Driver.

=== ChickFight XI ===
- Date: August 3, 2008
- Location: The Caribbean Centre in Ipswich, Suffolk

Episode 1

| # | Results | Stipulations | Times |
|---|---|---|---|
| 1 | Jetta and Wesna defeated Team Blossom (Holly & Hannah) | Tag team match | 10:10 |
| 2 | Jade defeated Faith Lehaine | Singles match | 05:19 |
| 3 | Blue Nikita defeated Becky James, Skarlett Venom and Maya | Four Corners elimination match | 05:35 |

Episode 2

| # | Results | Stipulations | Times |
|---|---|---|---|
| 1 | Jetta defeated Faith Lehaine | Singles match | 00:28 |
| 2 | Maya defeated Becky James | Singles match | 04:34 |
| 3 | Blue Nikita defeated Wesna | ChickFight Rules match | 20:28 |
| 4 | Eden Black defeated Jetta | Career vs Humiliation match | 17:30 |

== ECWA Super 8 ChickFight XII Tournament ==
ECWA Super 8 ChickFight Tournament
- Promotion: ChickFight East Coast Wrestling Association
- Date: October 11, 2014
- City: Carney's Point, New Jersey, USA
- Venue: YMCA of Carney's Point

| No. | Results | Stipulations | Times |
|---|---|---|---|
| 1 | Jenny Rose defeated Annie Social | Singles match; first round of the Super 8 ChickFight tournament | |
| 2 | Gabby Gilbert defeated Nikki Addams | Singles match; first round of the Super 8 ChickFight tournament | |
| 3 | Tessa Blanchard defeated Tina San Antonio | Singles match; first round of the Super 8 ChickFight tournament | |
| 4 | Renee Michelle defeated Candy Cartwright | Singles match; first round of the Super 8 ChickFight tournament | |
| 5 | Bobby Shields (c) defeated Ricky Martinez and Robbie E | Three-way match; ECWA Heavyweight Championship | |
| 6 | Mark Harro (c) defeated Mr. Ooh La La | Singles match; ECWA Mid Atlantic Championship | |
| 7 | Jenny Rose defeated Gabby Gilbert | Singles match; semifinals of the Super 8 ChickFight tournament | |
| 8 | Tessa Blanchard defeated Renee Michelle | Singles match; semifinals of the Super 8 ChickFight tournament | |
| 9 | Tessa Blanchard defeated Jenny Rose | Singles match; ECWA Women's Championship Super 8 ChickFight tournament final match | |

== ECWA 2nd Annual Super 8 ChickFight XIII Tournament ==
ECWA 2nd Annual Super 8 ChickFight Tournament
- Promotion: ChickFight East Coast Wrestling Association
- Date: October 17, 2015
- City: Woodbury Heights, New Jersey
- Venue: Woodbury Heights Community Center

| No. | Results | Stipulations | Times |
|---|---|---|---|
| 1 | Deonna Purrazzo defeated Miranda Vionette | Singles match; first round of the 2nd Annual Super 8 ChickFight tournament | |
| 2 | Brittany Blake defeated Terra Calaway | Singles match; first round of the 2nd Annual Super 8 ChickFight tournament | |
| 3 | Kennadi Brink defeated Savannah Evans | Singles match; first round of the 2nd Annual Super 8 ChickFight tournament | |
| 4 | Tessa Blanchard defeated Daysia Danielle | Singles match; first round of the 2nd Annual Super 8 ChickFight tournament | |
| 5 | Team PCA (Damian Adams and Ricky Martinez) defeated The Extreme Rednecks (Chuck Payne and Kyle Payne) (c) | Tag team match; ECWA Tag Team Championship | |
| 6 | Bobby Shields (c) defeated Ricky Martinez | Singles match; ECWA Mid Atlantic Championship | |
| 7 | Deonna Purrazzo defeated Brittany Blake | Singles match; semifinals of the 2nd Annual Super 8 ChickFight tournament | |
| 8 | Tessa Blanchard defeated Kennadi Brink | Singles match; semifinals of the 2nd Annual Super 8 ChickFight tournament | |
| 9 | Sean Carr defeated Matt Saigon (c) | Singles match; ECWA Heavyweight Championship | |
| 10 | Deonna Purrazzo defeated Tessa Blanchard | Singles match; ECWA Women's Championship 2nd Annual Super 8 ChickFight tournament final match | |

== Shimmer Women Athletes Volume 71 ChickFight XIV Tournament ==
Shimmer Women Athletes Volume 71
- Promotion(s): ChickFight; Shimmer Women Athletes
- Date: March 28, 2015
- City: San Jose, California
- Venue: Santa Clara County Fairgrounds

| No. | Results | Stipulations | Times |
|---|---|---|---|
| 1 | Evie defeated Portia Perez | Singles match; first round of the ChickFight tournament | |
| 2 | Nicole Savoy defeated Candice LeRae | Singles match; first round of the ChickFight tournament | |
| 3 | Nikki Storm defeated Cherry Bomb | Singles match; first round of the ChickFight tournament | |
| 4 | Kay Lee Ray defeated Kimber Lee | Singles match; first round of the ChickFight tournament | |
| 5 | Mia Yim defeated Athena | Singles match; first round of the ChickFight tournament | |
| 6 | Cheerleader Melissa defeated Jessicka Havok | Singles match; first round of the ChickFight tournament | |
| 7 | Evie defeated Nicole Savoy | Singles match; semifinals of the ChickFight tournament | |
| 8 | Kay Lee Ray defeated Nikki Storm | Singles match; semifinals of the ChickFight tournament | |
| 9 | Cheerleader Melissa defeated Mia Yim by disqualification | Singles match; semifinals of the ChickFight tournament | |
| 10 | Nicole Matthews (c) defeated Tomoka Nakagawa | Singles match for the Shimmer Championship | |
| 11 | Kay Lee Ray defeated Cheerleader Melissa and Evie | Three-way elimination match; finals of the ChickFight tournament | |

== Trans-Atlantic Championship ==
After the promotion moved to the UK whilst still retaining many North American wrestlers, the company entered into an agreement with Real Quality Wrestling and created a suitably titled Trans-Atlantic Champion to be defended. However, after nine months of inactivity the title was retired on August 3, 2008.

Key
| No. | Overall reign number |
| Reign | Reign number for the specific champion |
| Days | Number of days held |

| No. | Champion | Championship change | | | Reign statistics | | Notes | Ref. |
| No. | Champion | Date | Event | Location | Reign | Days | Notes | Ref. |
|---|---|---|---|---|---|---|---|---|
| 1 | Cheerleader Melissa | April 22, 2007 | ChickFight 8 | Gloucester, Gloucestershire | 1 | 469 | Defeated Eden Black in a falls count anywhere match to become the inaugural champion. | |
| — | Deactivated | August 3, 2008 | — | — | — | — | The championship retired due to conflicting business schedules. | |
