= Rachel Summerlyn =

American retired professional wrestler (born 1986)

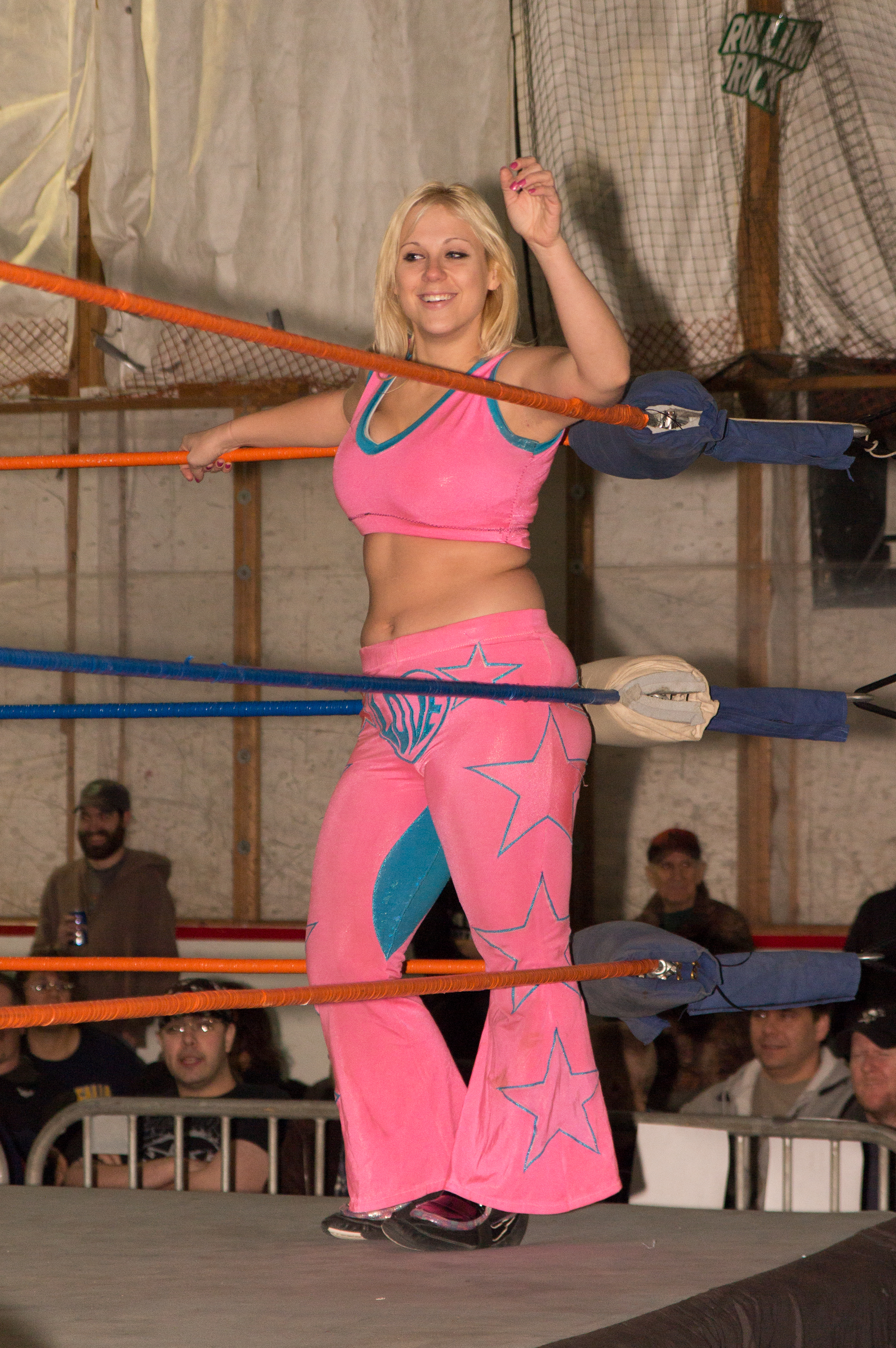
- Summerlyn at a 2CW show in 2013

Personal information
- Born: Rachel Childres; July 1, 1986 (age 40) Austin, Texas, United States

Professional wrestling career
- Ring name(s): Rachel Summerlyn; Rachel Putski
- Billed height: 5 ft 7 in (1.70 m)
- Billed weight: 165 lb (75 kg)
- Billed from: Austin, Texas; The International House of Paincakes
- Trained by: Jacob Ladder; Darin Childs
- Debut: 2006
- Retired: 2014

Rachel Childres (born July 1, 1986) is an American retired professional wrestler best known by her ring name Rachel Summerlyn. She wrestled for several independent wrestling promotions, most notably for Shimmer Women Athletes and IWA Mid-South. She formerly performed for several Northern United States–based independent promotions as well as the all-female promotion Shimmer Women Athletes. Under her original ring name Rachel Putski, she was billed as the granddaughter of former professional wrestler and 1995 WWF Hall of Famer Ivan Putski, though they are not actually related or otherwise associated.

== Career ==
=== Early career ===
Rachel made her debut as Rachel Putski and on November 3, 2006, took part in the first ever Queen of the Deathmatch tournament, where she defeated Vanessa Kraven in a thumbtack death match in the first round, but ended up being eliminated in the quarter finals by the eventual winner of the whole tournament Mickie Knuckles in a taipei death match. After the tournament, and a call from Ivan Putski's lawyers, she changed her ring name to Rachel Summerlyn. After missing the following year's tournament, she came back to take part in Queen of the Deathmatch 2008. She defeated Annie Social in the first round but lost in the semifinals to the eventual winner Rebecca Payne. On May 4, 2009, she defeated Hailey Hatred, Daffney and Mickie Knuckles to win IWA-MS' second Volcano Girls tournament. On June 21, 2009, she took part in Anarchy Championship Wrestling's first annual American Joshi Queen of Queens tournament where she was eliminated in the semifinals by Sara Del Rey.

=== SHIMMER Women Athletes ===
On October 19, 2008, at the tapings of Volume 21, Summerlyn debuted on SPARKLE, the preshow of Shimmer Women Athletes, where she defeated Sassy Stephie to win a part in the main roster. On Volume 22, taped that same night, she was defeated by Amazing Kong. On May 2, 2009, she returned to SPARKLE where she teamed with Rayna Von Tosh in a winning effort against the team of Sassy Stephie and Kimberly Kash. On Volume 25, she tapped out to Cat Power in a 4-way match which also included Ariel and Kellie Skater. On November 8, 2009, Rachel teamed with Daffney against The International Home Wrecking Crew (Rain and Jetta) in a tag team match on Volume 27, only for Daffney to abandon Rachel and leave her to be defeated by the IHWC. Later in the night, Rachel defeated Daffney in a grudge match via DQ after Daffney didn't release an illegal hold over Rachel for more than 5 seconds.

As part of Volume 29 she wrestled LuFisto in a hard-hitting match where she was forced to submit to the juji-gatame.

On April 10, 2010, as part of SHIMMER Volume 30, Rachel teamed up with Jessica James as Rachel & Jessica's Excellent Tag Team in a losing effort against Annie Social & Melanie Cruise. The following night of SHIMMER tapings saw Rachel lose to Daffney in a No Disqualification match on Volume 31, while she defeated Kellie Skater on Volume 32.

In September, Rachel participated in the SHIMMER tapings of Volumes 33–36. On Volume 33, Rachel & Jessica's Excellent Tag Team defeated Athena & Bonesaw in the opening contest. On Volume 34, Rachel and Jessica's Excellent Tag Team were defeated by the Canadian NINJAs in a Shimmer Tag Team Championship match got Rachel was distracted by Daffney. On Volume 35, after being distracted by Daffney, was defeated by Sara Del Rey after a cross armbreaker. On Volume 36 she defeated Daffney in an I Quit Match with a Texas Cloverleaf in the ropes.

Rachel took part in the SHIMMER tapings of Volumes 37-40 in March 2011. On Volume 38, she was defeated by Mercedes Martinez and then she bounced back with a victory over Mena Libra on Volume 39. Rachel did not return to SHIMMER following these tapings, saying that she chose not to return to what she felt was not a fun working environment.

=== JAPW Women's Division ===
Rachel Summerlyn made her awaited debut for Jersey All Pro Wrestling WD on January 9, 2010 in a match against Ayako Hamada. Even if Rachel went strike for strike she lost to Hamada but due to her performance she will be booked back.

=== ACW and Texas Indys ===
Rachel has continued working in Anarchy Championship Wrestling as a mainstay based out of Austin, Texas. In 2009, she and Jessica James formed Rachel & Jessica's Excellent Tag Team. Teamed up against the Canadian NINJAs for the SHIMMER tag championships on October 18, 2009 for the NINJAs' first tag title defense. They teamed up on February 21 in a loss to Gary Jay and Davey Vega. In March, Rachel appeared in various promotions including Victory Crown Championship Wrestling, where she teamed with Darin Childs to defeat Robert Evans, and Insane Hardcore Wrestling Entertainment where she successfully defend the ACW American Joshi title over Lillie Mae. On May 29, Rachel lost the ACW American Joshi title to Athena but quickly regained it two weeks later.

She lost the ACW American Joshi title to Daffney on June 27, 2010, in the 1st round of the ACW Queen of Queens tournament. Summerlyn & Jessica James will receive an ACW tag team title shot on July 18. On January 16, 2011, Rachel competed in a 10,000 thumbtacks match where she was defeated by Athena at ACW Guilty by Association V.

On February 21 at A Psychotic Break Summerlyn and James defeated Flippy Sh!t (Brent Masters and Matt Fitchett), The Lost Boys (Jason Silver and Sky de Lacrimosa) and tag team champions The Smurf Nation (Chingo Smurf and JC Bravo) in a Four Way Elimination Match winning tag team titles (second for Rachel, first for Jessica) On June 8, 2012, Rachel defeated Jen Alise to win the NWA Lonestar Women's Championship for the first time. On August 10 she successfully defended the title against Miss Maulie, Then On September 14 she lost the championship to Barbi Hayden. On November 11, 2012, Rachel won ACW's annual Lonestar Classic tournament to become the ACW Heavyweight Champion. Rachel lost the championship to Evan Gelistico on January 20, 2013 in what is being said to be her final match in ACW.

Rachel has also appeared for Squared Circle Wrestling, where she won the Girls Grand Prix 1 Tournament on February 24, 2012; defeating Sara Del Rey in the finals. On July 13, Rachel defeated the evil Mickie James in a singles match, despite James turning villainous and resorting to heel tactics during the match.

In July 2014, Rachel appeared at an Inspire Pro Wrestling event to give a final farewell to the fans of Austin, Texas.

== Championships and accomplishments ==
- Anarchy Championship Wrestling
  - ACW-IWA Texas Tag Team Championship (2 times) – with Skylar Skelly (1) with Jessica James (1)
  - ACW American Joshi Championship (2 times)
  - ACW Televised Championship (1 time)
  - American Joshi Queen of Queens (2011)
  - ACW Heavyweight Championship (1 time)
  - ACW Lonestar Classic (2012)
- Independent Wrestling Association Mid-South
  - Volcano Girls (2008)
- Pro Wrestling Illustrated
  - Ranked No. 34 of the top 50 female wrestlers in the PWI Female 50 in 2011
- NWA Lonestar
  - NWA Lonestar Women's Championship (1 time)
- Squared Circle Wrestling
  - Girls Grand Prix (2012)
