= Jetta (wrestler) =

British professional wrestler (born 1987)

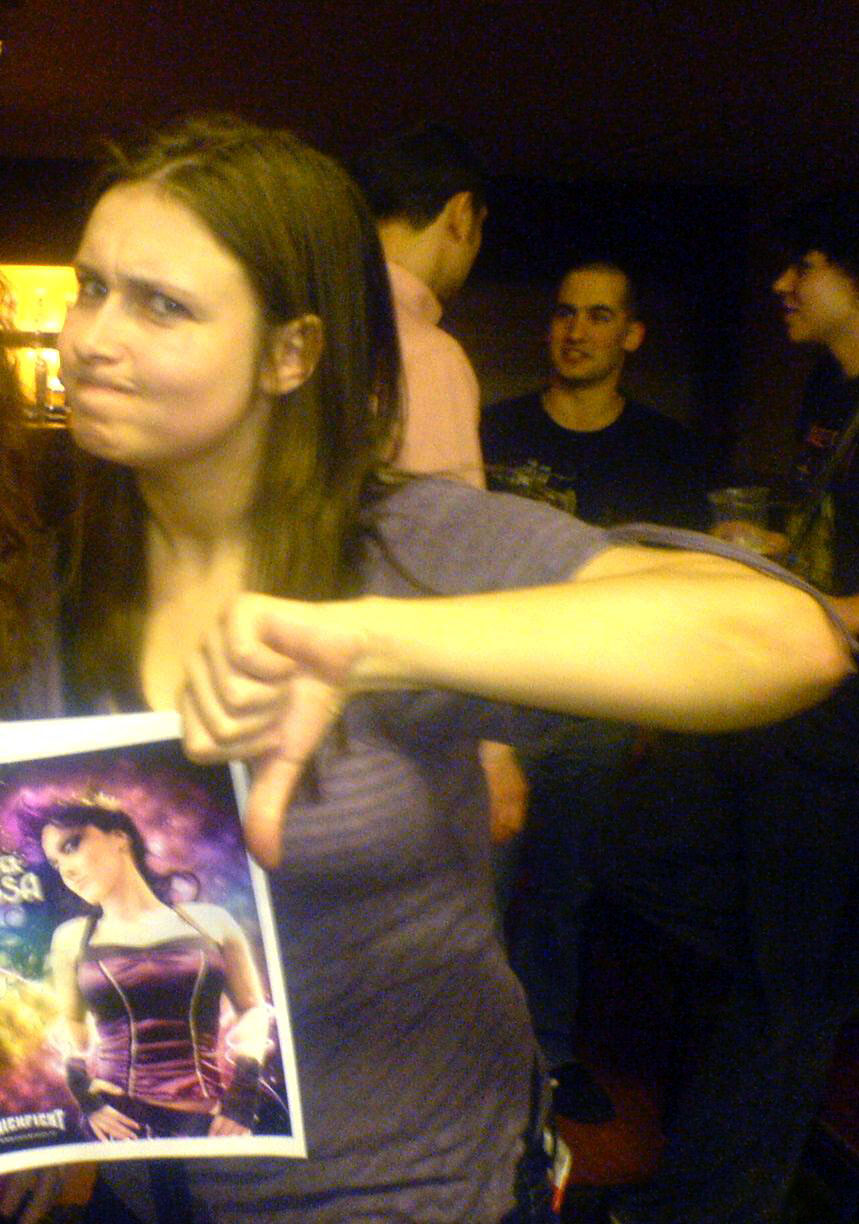
- Jetta in 2008 after taping ChickFight X

Personal information
- Born: Victoria Owen; 6 August 1987 (age 38) Coventry, England
- Spouse: Yasmin Lander (m. 2023)

Professional wrestling career
- Billed height: 5 ft 5 in (1.65 m)
- Billed weight: 130 lb (9.3 st)
- Trained by: Midlands Professional Wrestling; Majik; Psycho Steve
- Debut: August 2002
- Retired: June 2024

Victoria Owen (born 6 August 1987) is a retired English professional wrestler who wrestles as Jetta. She is best known for her work on the independent circuit in England with various promotions including LDN Wrestling, ChickFight and Real Quality Wrestling. She also wrestled in America with Shimmer Women Athletes, where she was part of the alliance The International Home Wrecking Crew.

She has primarily performed as a villainous character, using the gimmick of an arrogant and outspoken individual earning her the name 'Coventry's Loudest'. Fighting Spirit Magazine exclusively named her and early rival Eden Black as "spearheading a revolution in British wrestling" with regards to serious female wrestling. In April 2010, Jetta announced after a match in her home town that she would be retiring from wrestling in June of that year.

== Professional wrestling career ==
=== Midlands Professional Wrestling (2002–2005) ===
Jetta started her career in 2002 training with the Midlands Professional Wrestling (MPW) training school near where she lived, in her hometown of Coventry. She showed little interest in wrestling until the late '90s wrestling boom in America. She trained under the tutelage of NWA UK Hammerlock veterans Majik and Psycho Steve. Jetta wrestled many matches for MPW, eventually establishing herself as one their most talented performers, mixing it up with both the male and female wrestlers. Although she denies having any influences, having started wrestling so late, she admires World Wrestling Entertainment's Hulk Hogan, as well as British talent Dynamite Kid and World Association of Wrestling's Ricky Knight and Sweet Saraya. Her career was temporarily impeded in July 2005 when she broke both forearms and had to have metal plates inserted, stopping her wrestling for the rest of the year.

=== LDN Wrestling (2006–2009) ===
Jetta made her television debut on LDN Wrestling in a match against "The Jezebel" Eden Black who she would feud with for the next two years across different promotions and continents. The match took place at Caesar's Beatings on 15 July 2006, in Jezebel's hometown of Romford. Black managed to pick up the victory which did nothing but anger Jetta, who swiftly demanded a rematch. Jetta had her wish on the televised show of 10 September 2006 but she was beaten once again by her rival. Jetta had to wait until Born to be Wyld in November before she could proclaim victory over Eden Black, in a four way elimination match including Skye and Violet. The feud grew into a scheduled mixed tag match at the LDN Anniversary Show including Jetta's manager John Chapman, however the match went to a no contest after Black's partner, JP Monroe, turned on her nine minutes into the match. Skye reclaimed victory from the fatal-four way the following year in a singles match on 14 April. As well taking on, and defeating, male opponent "Sweet" Steven Lee, and losing to Sean King in January 2009 Jetta has made a guest appearance commentating for the Capital TV programme.

=== Real Quality Wrestling (2006–2009) ===
Jetta debuted in the umbrella promotion Real Quality Wrestling (RQW) in August 2006 at Summer Brawl after gaining some notoriety on the wrestling circuit and was put straight into a three-way match for the RQW Women's Championship where she was bested by her nemesis, Eden Black with Sweet Saraya also featuring. In a tag team contest that saw two feuds collide, Jetta teamed with Cheerleader Melissa to take on their respective rivals Black and MsChif in a winning effort. Later on that year, on 16 June, Jetta attempted to gain the RQW Women's Championship from her nemesis in a four-way elimination match, also including Amazing Kong and Wesna that ultimately saw Wesna pick up the victory, winning the title from Eden Black. Jetta made a further attempt for RQW gold in December by making a backstage assault on Eden Black at Not Just For Christmas, sending a message to champion Wesna and demanding a title shot. The match, refereed by Sweet Saraya at No Pain, No Gain the following month came to an abrupt end when Jetta walked out, resulting in a count out, due to a legitimate injury that caused her to collapse afterwards, she lost a rematch at Athletik Club Wrestling's Riptide II the next month too.

==== World Association of Women's Wrestling ====
Sweet Saraya's presence as referee harked back to her feud with Jetta in World Association of Women's Wrestling, a promotion under RQW, where Jetta won the WAWW British Championship from Saraya, ostensibly putting her out of action for over six months as a result (this was actually due to an injury during an RQW match with Cheerleader Melissa). Saraya made her return in December 2007, only to see Jetta reclaim the WAWW British Championship. Saraya instantly set her sights on the belt, losing on 24 February by disqualification and on 26 May after being hit by a foreign object from Britani Knight that was meant to help her. Jetta also won a tag match against Saraya and Knight, alongside Jade, thanks to interference from Knight's erstwhile partner Melodi, on 18 May; when Jetta tagged up with Melodi, Saraya and Knight earned the win on 26 May without any interference or disqualifications and Saraya earned a shot at the British Ladies Championship as a result. The two fought in a point-based eight rounds match, with lumberjacks, on Sunday 29 June with Jetta losing 2–1 from a boston crab in the final round and instantly demanded a rematch, blaming distraction from Saraya's husband.

When she did not receive a rematch of the British Ladies Championship, she aimed for Saraya's recently won RQW Women's Championship and, in August 2008, competed in a number one contendership three way match under the auspices of Saraya who acted as special guest referee, making the three count to let Jetta beat Britani Knight and Destiny. Her win earned her a place at the following February's WAW 15th Anniversary Show where she won the RQW Women's Championship after some assistance from Britani Knight.

=== ChickFight (2007–2008) ===
Jetta made her ChickFight debut at the Liquid Nightclub in Gloucester on 22 April 2007, at ChickFight VIII. In the first round Jetta won a bout with fellow LDN alumnus Skye, but she fell to Shimmer rival MsChif in the semi-finals. Chickfight IX: Our Final Chance took place on 17 July 2007, at the Orpington Halls in Orpington, Kent, otherwise known as the home of IPW:UK. Jetta was eliminated from the tournament in the first round by Blue Nikita.

Jetta trapped in the Garden of Eden around the ringpost at ChickFight XI

Despite, or perhaps because of this loss, she is fast becoming the premiere heel of the promotion. At the next event, ChickFight IX.5, she berated the Skegness crowd before viciously defeating Skye in two straight falls. Before the night was over she cost Eden Black her contest with Wesna due to interference, leading to a hastily scheduled match between the pair which quickly degenerated into a ringside brawl before Jetta screwed Black, pinning her using the ropes. To top off an already mischievous evening, Jetta then reported Cheerleader Melissa, who was on already on a warning, to the CF management leading to her suspension. She continued to interfere in others' business at 4 May 2008 CF taping; she came to the ring after Melissa and Wesna's fight, defending the losing Wesna claiming company bias due to Melissa's new television fame (Wesna returned the favour by interrupting Jetta vs Melissa, saving Jetta from the Kudo Driver) and later, as Black was announcing her retirement due to a severe shoulder injury, Jetta interrupted and cut a promo demanding The Jezebel recognise Jetta as the real reason she was retiring, this resulted in the two being booked for the main event on 3 August ChickFight card. The event, hampered by injuries, saw Jetta attempt to send a message to Black by squashing Faith Lehain in twenty-eight seconds early in the show but, despite spending most of the match working on The Jezebel's injured and taped up shoulder, Jetta would tap out to the Garden of Eden after a twenty-minute match.

=== Shimmer Women Athletes (2007–2009) ===
==== Singles competition ====
In what was probably Jetta's biggest match to date, she put her long standing issues with Eden Black aside and both women represented the United Kingdom in a Shimmer Women Athletes guest match, for Ring of Honor (ROH). The match took place on 4 March 2007 at ROH's Fifth Year Festival Finale in Liverpool, during their tour of the United Kingdom. Jetta and Jezebel were defeated by United States representatives, Sara Del Rey and Allison Danger, but still managed to show a strong effort against the experienced duo. Jetta would return to the promotion across the pond, becoming a regular for Shimmer tapings from October 2007's Volume 15 where she defeated Serena Deeb. Despite a singles loss to Haze, she still impressed as a singles wrestler by winning the Volume 19 battle royal, entering seventh out of twenty one competitors and earning a Shimmer Championship match later on that same evening; the victory was somewhat tainted, though, as rather than eliminate the final competitor, Ariel was merely pulled out by enraged former champion Del Rey. She lost to MsChif's desecrator the championship match late that night.

==== International Home Wrecking Crew ====
Though she has made some progress as a singles wrestler, Jetta's best-known contribution to Shimmer has been as part of a team. During Volume 16 she fought alongside The Minnesota Home Wrecking Crew (Lacey and Rain), taking the pin from Daizee Haze who had teamed up with "The Jezebel" Eden Black and MsChif, who she had defeated in Real Quality Wrestling earlier in the year. Later Lacey and Rain revealed that Jetta had become part of the newly named International Home Wrecking Crew as the proverbial cream in their Oreo. Though they lost their outing as a trio, Lacey soon absented herself from wrestling and just partnering with Rain, the team won against Danyah and Jennifer Blake during Volume 17.

During Volume 20 the tag team picked up a victory over Ashley Lane and Nevaeh, sparking a feud between the two teams. The feud heightened in October when Shimmer held a Tag team gauntlet to crown the inaugural Shimmer Tag Team Champions. After defeating The Suicide Blondes (LuFisto and Jennifer Blake), they lost their chance at being inaugural champions by being eliminated by eventual winners Lane and Nevaeh. With the teams evenly matched at a fall each, and the new tag team belts deepening the feud, the two were announced to compete at Volume 23 in a two out of three falls match. The Home Wrecking Crew scored the first fall when Lacey made a shocking return to wrestling after months of being absent and reversed a cradle pin behind the referee's back to help them win the first fall. When the referee tried to eject her she handed him a certified manager license and was allowed to stay at ringside but could not stop Lane from tying the score over Rain. The challengers got the third pinfall when Lacey threw a chain to Jetta and it appeared she had won the championships for the team. However, the match was restarted when the senior official notified the referee and in the end Lane and Nevaeh retained their titles when Nevaeh pinned Jetta. Later in the night the team of Jetta and Rain defeated the team of Nikki Roxx and The Portuguese Princess Ariel. After two Volume of singles action, where Jetta lost to Tenille and defeated Daffney, Jetta and Rain defeated the teams of Rachel Summerlyn and Daffney and Jessie McKay and Tenille as part of Volumes 27 and 28.

Jetta and Rain reunited in November 2011 at Women Superstars Uncensored for their iPPV Breaking Barriers II in a fan favourite role, challenging The Boston Shore for the WSU Tag Team titles but they were unsuccessful.

== Other media ==
Jetta has appeared on Sky Digital channel 427, otherwise known as TWC Fight!. She has appeared on the channel for LDN Wrestling, Irish Whip Wrestling, and Real Quality Wrestling. Jetta has also appeared on ABC 7 and Rumble Radio in Chicago as part of Shimmer promotional news features. She has also been interviewed for Fighting Spirit magazine, mainly about her involvement in ChickFight.

== Personal life ==
On 12 December 2020, Jetta confirmed her engagement to a fellow professional wrestler Yasmin Lander, better known by the ring name Charlie Morgan. They got married in August 2023.

== Championships and accomplishments ==
  - ABC Women's Championship (1 time, current)
- Dragon Pro Wrestling
  - Celtic Crown Womens Championship (1 time, inaugural)
- Elite Wrestling Federation
  - EWF Joint Championship (1 time) – with Leon Van Owen
- Independent Wrestling Federation
  - IWF Women's Championship (1 time)
- International Pro Wrestling: United Kingdom
  - IPW:UK Women's Championship (1 time)
- Midlands Professional Wrestling
  - Queen of the Ring (3 times)
- Pro-Wrestling: EVE
  - Pro-Wrestling: EVE Championship (2 time)
  - Pro-Wrestling: EVE Tag Team Championship (1 time) – with Erin Angel
- Pro Wrestling Illustrated
  - Ranked No. 29 of the top 50 female wrestlers in the PWI Female 50 in 2009
- World Association of Women's Wrestling
  - RQW Women's Championship (1 time)
  - WAWW British Ladies Championship (1 time)
