= Eden Black =

British professional wrestler

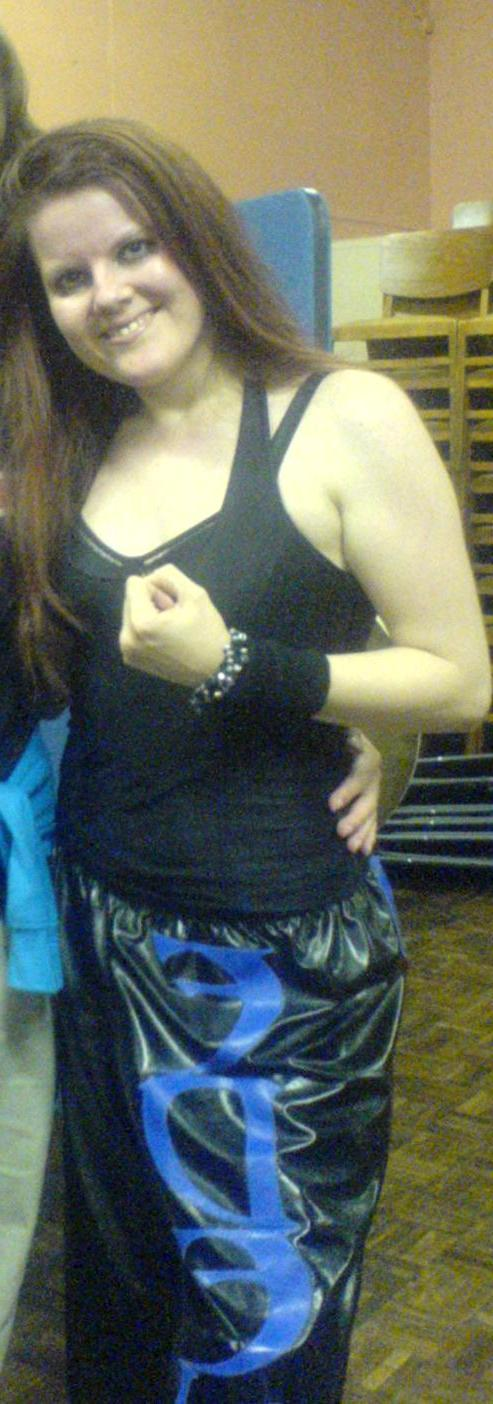
- Eden Black after her final match

Personal information
- Born: 28 January 1981 (age 45)

Professional wrestling career
- Ring name: Eden Black
- Billed height: 5 ft 5 in (165 cm)
- Billed weight: 126 lb (57.2 kg)
- Billed from: Romford, London
- Trained by: NWA UK Hammerlock; Andre Baker; Jon Ryan; JP Monroe
- Debut: 2001
- Retired: 2008

"The Jezebel" Eden Black (born 28 January 1981) is the ring name of a retired British professional wrestler who wrestled internationally on the independent circuit in promotions such as Real Quality Wrestling, Shimmer Women Athletes and ChickFight among others. She was known for her wrestling attire, choosing loose-fitting street clothes similar in style to Homicide, her strike-based style of fighting and her relationship with fellow wrestler JP Monroe. Fighting Spirit Magazine exclusively named her and rival Jetta as "spearheading a revolution in British wrestling" with regard to serious female wrestling.

== Professional wrestling career ==
=== Early career ===
After enjoying the World Wrestling Federation at a young age, particularly Ultimate Warrior, Black became reinterested in the late '90s by the age of 18. After achieving a 2:1 in Journalism and Contemporary History, Black began attending independent shows in Barking Town Hall, East London and after being inspired by wrestlers such as Robbie Brookside and James Mason, Black turned her own hand at wrestling through the NWA UK Hammerlock school in Kent, where she would wrestle her first matches, mainly battle royals.

=== Domestic circuit ===
After wrestling for Hammerlock her first significant appearance was part of an Independent Wrestling Federation Ladies Night to benefit Cancer research in 2004. After beating Jade in the first round, she lost to eventual winner Lexie Fyfe By 2006 she began to work in promotions around the UK, as well beating Skye in Irish Whip Wrestling, including appearing on the second televised show of LDN Wrestling, Caesar's Beatings, where she defeated Coventry-born wrestler Jetta beginning a long-standing feud between the two. The feud saw Jetta being inserted into a three-way match, also featuring Sweet Saraya, for the vacant Real Quality Wrestling Women's Championship at Summer Brawl where Black won her first title. She was initially successful in the feud winning all her matches until the two competed in an intergender tag team match which Black and partner JP Monroe lost; the second match ended in a no-contest when Monroe turned on Black.

=== International Circuit ===
Black began 2007 with RQW's No Pain, No Gain event, having to defend her Women's Championship against American wrestlers Cheerleader Melissa and MsChif but went on to lose singles matches against both of them, first to MsChif the next day for 3 Count Wrestling. The day after this was the first ChickFight to be held in the UK where Black advanced to the finals of a three-round tournament after defeating Daizee Haze and Lacey, but coming up short against Melissa. Her feud with Melissa continued at RQW's Taking on the World where she tagged with fellow Melissa enemy MsChif to take on the Cheerleader and her own long-standing rival Jetta. The match also served as a warm up for ChickFight VIII where Black was booked to meet Melissa again to crown the first TransAtlantic Champion; Black came out on the losing end of both matches.

Her losing streak to American wrestlers was not exclusive to MsChif and Melissa though. In March she put aside her longstanding rivalry with Jetta to team up against Allison Danger and Sara Del Rey at Ring of Honor's Liverpool show Fifth Year Festival: Finale. Allison Danger used the victory to bid for Black's title, gaining a chance at the Women's Championship during an RQW event; Black would retain the belt after the match went to a fifteen-minute time limit draw. Eden Black then began to make regular appearances at Danger's all-female Shimmer Women Athletes in Chicago eventually picking up a win over an American athlete in the form of Rain, who submitted to her Garden of Eden hold on Volume 9. In June at Shimmer's Volume 11 event, Black was entered into a knock-out tournament to crown the first Shimmer Champion but lost in the first round to Rain's fellow Minnesota Home Wrecking Crew member Lacey; incidentally these two would later team up with Jetta to form The International Home Wrecking Crew. The day after this, at Volume 12 Nikki Roxx pinned her in a four-way match with the Barbie Crusher. On Volume 13, taped that same day, Black had a chance to settle an old score when she fought Lexie Fyfe, who had beaten her early on in her career in 2004. Once again it was her Garden of Eden submission which led her to victory. Black's success continued onto Volume 14 in October, where she again forced her opponent, this time Amber O'Neal, to tap out to the Garden of Eden. In her last Shimmer appearance to date, she teamed with MsChif and Daizee Haze in a six-woman tag team contest in the debut match of the International Home Wrecking Crew. Though Black did not secure the victory herself, she was on the winning team and it was her rival Jetta who was pinned after 25 minutes following Haze's Heart punch/Yakuza kick combination.

=== Back in Britain ===
Black using the Garden of Eden on Jetta in her final match

Although Black was mostly successful in America, months prior to her final SHIMMER appearance she lost her RQW Women's Championship at a 16 June RQW event to German wrestler Wesna, with Jetta and Amazing Kong also competing in the four-way elimination match. Her rematch with Wesna, this time in a singles match, took place at ChickFight IX.5 but ended in a controversial manner when Jetta interfered in the match to make it seem as if Black had used a foreign object, thus having her disqualified. Enraged, Black chased Jetta out of the building but the two were booked for a grudge match later on that same night; Giving Jetta a taste of her own medicine, Black attacked her from behind during her entrance leading to a brawl all around ringside that consumed most of the match until it officially began inside the ring with Black eventually losing as Jetta used the ropes for the pin. After Black was on the winning side of the tag team match at Shimmer, it became clear the two needed to settle their feud one-on-one and RQW decided to host the match in October. However, the hotly anticipated bout ended in a double count-out ostensibly due to the fierce fighting between the two, though Black had actually suffered a legitimate shoulder injury during the match and could not carry on.

Black would not appear again until April at a ChickFight event where she made an emotional retirement announcement that was interrupted by Jetta who demanded Black explicitly acknowledge she was the reason Black was retiring but rather than ignore her, Black challenged her to what was dubbed a "Career vs. Humiliation" match at ChickFight XI where, should she lose, Black would have to admit it was Jetta that retired her but if she won Jetta would have to publicly go on her knees and admit Black's superiority. Jetta made her intentions known by squashing Faith LeHaine early on in the evening, wrenching her shoulder with a Japanese stranglehold and spent most of the match against Black working on her shoulder but Black retaliated, applying the Garden of Eden around the ring post and eventually locking it on Jetta in the middle of the ring forcing her to tap out. Following the match Black announced that she didn't need Jetta to go on her knees as she had just proven her superiority in the match. She later announced her retirement from wrestling.

== Championships and accomplishments ==
- Real Quality Wrestling
  - RQW Women's Championship (1 time)
