= Lacey (wrestler) =

American professional wrestler

Personal information
- Born: April 27, 1983 (age 43) Minneapolis, Minnesota, U.S.

Professional wrestling career
- Ring name(s): Lacey; The Lovely Lacey; White Magic
- Billed height: 5 ft 6 in (1.68 m)
- Billed weight: 135 lb (61 kg)
- Billed from: Minneapolis, Minnesota
- Trained by: Eddie Sharkey; Horace the Psychopath
- Debut: August 2000
- Retired: April 2008

Larissa Vados (born April 27, 1983) is an American former professional wrestler who went under the ring name Lacey, most known for working with numerous promotions throughout Northern America such as Ring of Honor, Shimmer, IWA-Mid South, Full Impact Pro, and NWA Midwest. She has also wrestled for Chikara, ChickFight, and was part of Wrestling Society X. As well as managing many wrestlers, she regularly teamed with Rain as the Minnesota Homewrecking Crew (a play on the name of the Minnesota Wrecking Crew) and then with the addition of British wrestler Jetta as The International Home Wrecking Crew in Shimmer. Lacey is considered one of ROH's Women of Honor, a title taken from the Straight Shootin' shoot interview of the same name. She is now semi-retired, wrestling matches for custom shoots and websites and assuming a valet/manager role in Shimmer to the International Home Wrecking Crew.

== Professional wrestling career ==
Lacey made her ring debut in August, 2000 as The Lovely Lacey in Minnesota in a handicap match that also featured Shawn Daivari. From then until late 2003 she regularly feuded with Rain all across the Midwest wrestling circuit in promotions such as Steel Domain Wrestling and Mid American Wrestling (MAW). This includes a Falls Count Anywhere match held in MAW on September 28, 2002. On January 14, 2007, she participated in the seventh ChickFight tournament, losing in the first round to Eden Black.

=== IWA Mid-South ===
Lacey made her IWA Mid-South debut on November 2, 2002, in a three-way dance that featured Rain but was won by Hailey Hatred. In late 2003 Lacey and Rain put their kayfabe differences aside and formed a tag team known as The Minnesota Home Wrecking Crew. The team proceed to have matches against the team of Daizee Haze and Mickie Knuckles, losing to them on December 20, 2003, but defeating them on May 7, 2004.

In singles competition Lacey had greater success. On February 13, 2004, Lacey defeated Daizee Haze. On March 6, she emerged the victor in a 6-way dance which featured Rain, Haze, MsChif, Mickie Knuckles and ODB. Lacey defeated Mercedes Martinez and Haze in a 3-way dance to win a 1-night Tournament on May 30 to become the first NWA Midwest Women's Champion. On September 17, she lost the title to Martinez, ending her 110-day reign as champion. The following night, September 18 she was unsuccessful in winning the title back in a 6-way elimination match which was won by MsChif and featured Rain, Mickie Knuckles, Daizee Haze and Martinez.

=== Ring of Honor ===
==== Special K ====
Lacey made her Ring of Honor (ROH) debut as part of the Special K faction as a girlfriend in mid-2004. During September up until November Lacey would become involved in arguments and then catfights with fellow Special K valet Becky Bayless, sparked by the factions frequent tag-team losses. On December 4, after the group lost an 8-man tag to a team of ROH students Special K finally broke up as Izzy, Deranged and Lacey turned on Dixie, AngelDust and Bayless. On December 26 Deranged and Lacey defeated AngelDust and Becky Bayless when Lacey pinned Bayless.

==== Lacey's Angels ====
In 2005, as well as wrestling Lacey began a manager and valet role, leading Lacey's Angels of Izzy and Deranged, and now featuring Cheech and Cloudy. On October 1, Lacey announced that after her men had failed to get the wins she wanted a new Lacey's Angels would debut the following night. On October 2, after BJ Whitmer and Jimmy Jacobs defeated Izzy & Deranged, she fired them and hired Whitmer and Jacobs as her new angels. Lacey accompanied Jacobs and Whitmer to the ring for their tag and singles matches.

As part of making the new Lacey's Angels into a dominant force, Lacey in particular made continued efforts to turn Jacobs into a serious wrestler away from his previous comical gimmick. This including giving him a 'flashy' ring robe, refusing him to wear furry boots or shout 'Huss' and wear proper ring gear. However, in doing so she had unwittingly made Jacobs fall in love with her, to the point where he was more concerned with winning her heart rather than matches. Jacobs' antics began to aggravate BJ Whitmer when it cost them both matches. Whitmer finally turned on Jacobs in January 2006 after losing an ROH Tag Team Championship match against Austin Aries and Roderick Strong when Jacobs paid more attention to Lacey at ringside than the match. Lacey and Jacobs then entered into a feud with Whitmer, based on Lacey ordering Jacobs to put Whitmer out of wrestling. Lacey went as far as offering advice to Christopher Daniels on how to beat Whitmer in a match. On April 22, Jacobs made one last attempt to win Lacey's heart in a match with Colt Cabana. Pre-match, Lacey gave Jacobs a final ultimatum, demanding that he win or he would never be allowed to talk to her again. Jacobs subsequently lost the match. But the following night Lacey gave the same ultimatum to Jacobs before his 6-way match. Jacobs won the match.

From June onward, ROH began placing teases and hints that there was a 'romantic' relationship going on between Lacey and Colt Cabana. On August 25, Jacobs confronted Lacey about the rumors and later that night lost his match. On September 15 Lacey accompanied Jacobs for his 4-way match against Cabana, Jack Evans, and Ricky Reyes. Cabana made jokes about making it to third base with Lacey in the bushes before the match. During the match, Lacey kept encouraging Jacobs and Cabana to work together, a tease that Lacey was looking to start a new Lacey's Angels with Cabana and Jacobs. The next night, September 16, Lacey accompanied Jacobs for his three-way match against Cabana and Christopher Daniels. During the match, Jacobs low-blowed Cabana and pinned him to win the match. However, Lacey was concerned with Cabana being injured and berated Jacobs. On October 6, Lacey accompanied Jacobs and Cabana to the ring for their ROH Tag Team Championship match against champions Chris Hero and Claudio Castagnoli. Jacobs and Cabana lost when Jacobs accidentally speared Cabana, resulting in Cabana getting pinned to lose the match. On October 28, Lacey accompanied Cabana and Jacobs for their match against Jimmy Rave and Salvatore Rinauro which they won (their first win as a team). She then offered Cabana a contract to officially join Lacey's Angels. Cabana refused. He then attacked Cabana, gouging his eyes with Lacey's high heel shoe before BJ Whitmer ran out to make the save and Lacey and Jacobs fled the scene.

On November 3, the start of what would be a long-running feud between Daizee Haze and Lacey began when Lacey slapped her after her match. On November 24, Lacey was victorious in a four-way match which involved Haze, Allison Danger, and Nikki Roxx. Later on she accompanied Jacobs as he participated in a gauntlet match, using a low blow to defeat BJ Whitmer before being eliminated by Nigel McGuiness. The following night, November 25, Lacey accompanied Jacobs for his match against Whitmer. Lacey eventually interfered, attacking a weakened Whitmer which brought out Haze to stop Lacey from interfering and the two brawled.

On December 8, Lacey accompanied Jacobs for his match against Colt Cabana. Lacey threw a handful of powder in Cabana's face when he had Jacobs in a submission causing a disqualification. Daizee Haze fought with Lacey until Jacobs speared Haze hard. Brent Albright ran down to the ring and, he held Cabana down while Lacey stomped him the groin. Whitmer then ran down to make the save. The next night, December 9, Lacey accompanied Jacobs to the ring as part the main event, pitting Delirious, Whitmer (accompanied by Haze), Cabana, and McGuinness against Bryan Danielson, Jacobs, Rave and Shingo. During the match, Whitmer inadvertently hit Lacey with a railroad spike. On January 27, Lacey accompanied Jacobs for his Last Man Standing Match against Whitmer which Jacobs won thanks to Albright. Later in the evening, Albright and Lacey lost to Cabana and Sara Del Rey who substituted for an injured Haze. But post-match, Haze attacked Lacey. On February 23, Lacey accompanied Jacobs and Albright to the ring for their losing effort against Nigel McGuinness and Cabana. Later in the evening Lacey defeated Haze after Jacobs interfered and speared Haze. The following night, February 24, Lacey accompanied Jacobs for his "Windy City Death match" against Cabana. Early on Lacey tried to interfere, but Haze ran out and brawled with her to the back. Later in the match Lacey returned to attack Cabana again, only to be taken out before he laid out Jacobs and put Lacey face down on top of him as he pinned him. On March 30, Lacey and Jacobs defeated Whitmer and Haze. Post-match Lacey said Jacobs finally won her over and she gave him a hug to reward him for a job well done. The following night, March 31, Lacey accompanied Jacobs to the ring for his Steel Cage Match against Whitmer (accompanied by Haze). During the match Lacey tried to interfere but was taken out by a tombstone pile-driver from Whitmer. Jacobs won the match, winning their feud despite injuring himself in the match.

On April 27, The Minnesota Home Wrecking Crew (accompanied by Jacobs on crutches) defeated Sara Del Rey and Allison Danger. The following night, April 28, Jacobs revealed in a backstage promo that Lacey had promised her one night of ecstasy for taking out Whitmer. Even though he really wanted to do it, he did not do it. Jacobs said he loves Lacey and she is close to loving him too, adding that he and Lacey will be together, not because of lust, but because of love. Following these events, ROH released a four-part video series on YouTube entitled "Jimmy Loves Lacey", documenting Jacobs' attempts to win Lacey over an extended date of four days. Jacobs had mixed results, doing some good things but screwing up at other points. On the final day Lacey took Jacobs into her hotel room, the camera returning to the room 'later' and showing Lacey cuddling Jacobs (who looked conflicted), implying the two had had sex. The roles had now reversed between the two, with Jacobs seemingly taking control of himself and Lacey now being infatuated with Jacobs.

On June 8, Daizee Haze called out Lacey to get some revenge on her. Jacobs came out instead and insulted Haze's challenge which resulted in her attacking him with his own walking cane. Lacey then destroyed Haze and helped Jacobs walk backstage. The following night, June 9, Lacey (accompanied by Jacobs) fought Haze to a 10-minute time limit draw. On August 10, Lacey (accompanied by Jacobs) defeated Haze to earn a Shimmer Championship match on the next show. The following night, August 11, Sara Del Rey defeated Lacey to retain the Shimmer Championship.

==== The Age of the Fall ====
On September 15, Lacey accompanied Jacobs, the returning Necro Butcher and the debuting Tyler Black as they violently attacked The Briscoe Brothers at the end of the Man Up Pay Per View taping. They revealed themselves as a new stable called The Age of the Fall. Later on in a dark match, Lacey teamed with Sara Del Rey in a losing effort to Haze and Amazing Kong. Lacey assumed a manager role of the group, accompanying all AotF members to their matches and interfering when she could to help them win. As a result, Daizee Haze assumed a counter role to accompany wrestlers fighting AotF so she could stop Lacey from interfering. On November 2, Lacey accompanied Jacobs, Butcher, and Black for their victory over Jack Evans, Ruckus, and Jigsaw (accompanied by Julius Smokes). Post match Lacey and Haze brawled once more as part of a mass brawl between factions. The following night, November 3, Lacey accompanied Butcher and Jacobs to the ring for their Street Fight against The Briscoes (accompanied by Haze). Haze and Lacey immediately started brawling and disappeared to the back.

On December 30, Lacey accompanied Black and Jacobs to their victory for the ROH Tag Team Championship against The Briscoes (accompanied by Haze). On January 12, 2008, the team of Mark Briscoe, Haze, Jack Evans, and Jigsaw beat Butcher, Black, Jacobs, and Lacey in a Street Fight. On January 25, Haze defeated Lacey who was accompanied by Jacobs, Black, and Wonderland. Post match the AotF members threatened Daizee Haze until The Briscoes hit the ring to save her, when new AotF member Joey Matthews attacked The Briscoes from behind. On March 14, Lacey accompanied Butcher for his match against Delirious (accompanied by Haze). Later she accompanied Black and Matthews to the ring for their match over The Briscoes. On March 16, Lacey brawled with Haze during a Street Fight between The Briscoes and Butcher and Matthews.

In the months leading up to ROH's April events, Jacobs had made an open invitation to Austin Aries to join AotF both at ROH events and through YouTube videos and blog. On March 29, 2008, Lacey along with Rain accompanied Jacobs and Black against The Briscoes in a Relaxed Rules Match. Later in the show, AotF approached Aries after his match, again making the offer for him to join them. Lacey stepped in, offering to convince Aries who left the ring with her, a decision which did not sit well Jacobs. After the event, Jacobs posted a YouTube video asking for Lacey to call him as he had not heard from her in a while. On April 18, Lacey appeared after Aries' match, making out with him in the middle of the ring before leaving with him. On April 19, Lacey revealed she was leaving AotF, siding with Aries romantically. After the main event Jacobs called out Aries and the two brawled, before Aries was jumped by AotF. Jacobs went to attack Aries with his spike, but he stopped when Lacey begged him not to. Jacobs then contemplated hitting Lacey with the spike, but again broke down and cried, leaving the ring.

Following the April events, Jacobs posted a YouTube video telling Lacey that she had a week to call him. A week followed and a video was posted that showed Jacobs confronting Lacey outside an exercise business. The two seemed to argue with Lacey backing off. Then Jacobs produced his spike from his cane before the video cut off. Afterward, Lacey was absent from ROH. The Wrestling Observer Newsletter later confirmed Lacey had quit wrestling to return to school.

On November 22, 2008, Lacey made an appearance during its Pay Per View taping. She came out during the I Quit match between Aries and Jacobs, revealing herself to be the second Aries had selected for the match. Lacey acted as if she was going to throw in the towel to save Aries but became conflicted when Aries told her not to. Jacobs brought her into the ring, intending to hit her with his spike weapon but she slapped him. Later in the match she prevented Tyler Black (the second for Jacobs) from throwing in the towel.

=== Shimmer Women Athletes ===
Lacey became a mainstay of the Shimmer Women Athletes promotion, participating in every taping bar one (Volumes 3 and 4) since its first event until her retirement. On November 6, 2005, as part of Volume 1 she lost to Daizee Haze in the main event. Later on, as part of Volume 2, Lacey lost in a four-way that involved Mercedes Martinez, Haze, and winner Sara Del Rey. On May 21, 2006, as part of Volume 5, Lacey lost to Nikita. Later on, as part of Volume 6, The Minnesota Home Wrecking Crew defeated the team of Sara Del Rey and Mercedes Martinez, a match created after a backstage confrontation between Lacey, Del Rey, and Martinez on Volume 5.

On June 1, Lacey took part in the Shimmer Title Tournament. She ultimately lost to Sara Del Rey in the finals. During the match Rain unsuccessfully tried to interfere to help Lacey win, and was run off by Roxx and Allison Danger. Later on as part of Volume 13 The Minnesota Home Wrecking Crew suffered their first loss as a team in Shimmer, losing to Sara Del Rey and Nikki Roxx in the main event. On October 13, The Minnesota Home Wrecking Crew defeated the team of "The Portuguese Princess" Ariel and Josie on Volume 15. Later in the evening on Volume 16 they teamed with 'honorary home wrecker' Jetta in a six-woman tag-team match to take on Daizee Haze, Eden Black, and MsChif. Jetta lost the match for her team, taking the pin from Haze. After the taping the trio made it known that they now were The International Home Wrecking Crew but Lacey and Rain would still go by the Minnesota Home Wrecking Crew name when they teamed together. As part of Volume 18 The Minnesota Home Wrecking Crew suffered a loss to the team of Ashley Lane and Nevaeh. This also marked the end of The Minnesota Home Wrecking Crew as a team, as after the event Lacey retired from wrestling, making this Lacey's final match in wrestling. On May 2, 2009, at the tapings of Volume 23 Lacey was announced as the new manager of Rain and Jetta.

On October 11, 2015, Lacey made a one-night return to wrestling during Shimmer's tenth anniversary weekend, when she took part in Portia Perez's retirement match, where she, Perez, Kimber Lee and Nicole Matthews were defeated by Daizee Haze, Kellie Skater, Lexie Fyfe and Madison Eagles.

=== Other promotions ===
In Full Impact Pro, Lacey debuted in a loss to Allison Danger on September 8, 2006. She instantly started in an association The Heartbreak Express tag-team and SoCal Val, assuming a managerial role. The following night Lacey teamed with Heartbreak Express to defeat Black Market and Danger, winning Express the FIP Tag Team Championship. On May 25, 2007, when she turned on The Express and joined The YRR (Young, Rich, and Ready for action) stable. She then served a managerial role to the male members alongside Rain, Becky Bayless, and SoCal Val. On February 16, 2008, at FIP's Redefined event, Lacey and Rain (wrestling as The YRR as opposed to using the Minnesota Home Wrecking Crew name) defeated Allison Danger and Trenesha. Later in the night as part of storyline merging between ROH and FIP, Lacey turned on The YRR and remained loyal to Age of the Fall when lured by Tyler Black. Lacey then convinced Rain to also leave The YRR and join AotF, which she did. The two then accompanied Black and AotF members to the ring for their match, and accompanied them at future FIP events until Lacey's retirement where Rain remained in the same role.

Lacey was part of the short-lived MTV series Wrestling Society X. She was both a backstage correspondent and co-hosted WSX's Internet show called WSXtra alongside Fabian Kaelen.

Lacey made appearances in Women's Extreme Wrestling. On April 6, 2006, Lacey lost to Jazz. Later in the evening Lacey and Rain, wrestling as The Hot Home Wreckers defeated Shantelle Taylor and Pussy Willow. On May 5, 2007, Lacey and Rain lost to Annie Social and Sumie Sakai in a match to crown new WEW Tag Team Champions.

== Personal life ==
Lacey graduated from the University of Minnesota in 2004 and shortly thereafter moved out to Philadelphia. After two and a half years on the east coast she moved back to the Midwest. She grew up dancing, and after sixteen years, she took a hiatus to focus primarily on wrestling. She has also been a lifelong equestrian, and owns a horse in Minnesota.

== Championships and accomplishments ==
- French Lake Wrestling Association
  - FLWA Women's Championship (1 time)
- Independent Wrestling Association Mid-South
  - IWA Mid-South Women's Championship (1 time)
  - Volcano Girls (2004)
- Minnesota Independent Wrestling
  - MIW Women's Championship (2 times)
- NWA Midwest
  - NWA Midwest Women's Championship (1 time)
