= MsChif =

American professional wrestler

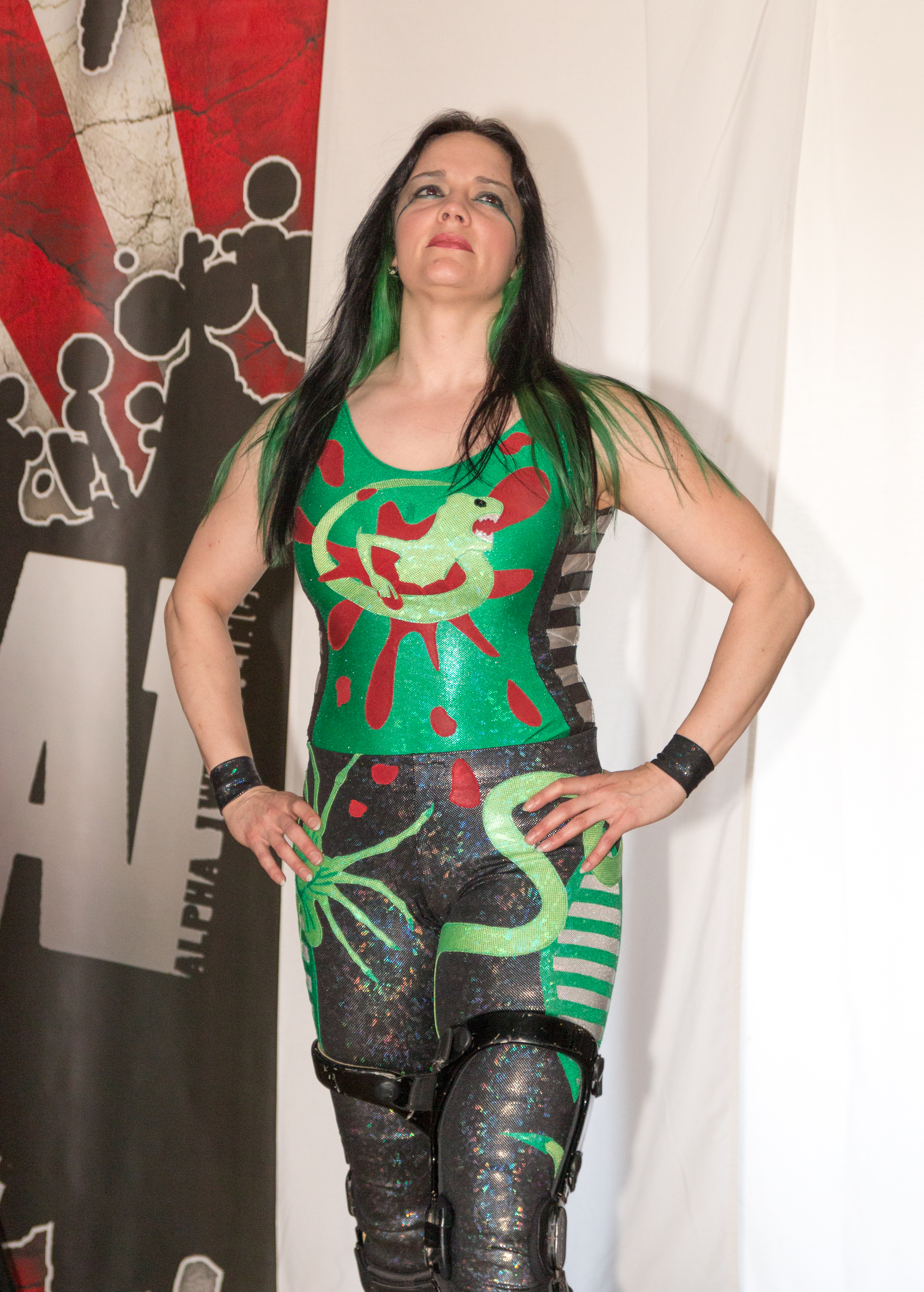
- MsChif in 2014

Personal information
- Born: Rachel Collins; June 11, 1976 (age 50) St. Louis, Missouri, U.S.
- Spouse: Michael Elgin (m. 2013; div. 2020)
- Children: 1

Professional wrestling career
- Ring name: MsChif
- Billed height: 5 ft 7 in (1.70 m)
- Billed weight: 135 lb (61 kg)
- Billed from: The Edge of the Netherworld; The Inferno; Dante's Inferno
- Trained by: Johnny Greenpeace; Jack Adonis
- Debut: July 19, 2001

Rachel Frobel (née Collins; born June 11, 1976) is an American professional wrestler who is better known by her ring name MsChif. She has been wrestling since 2001 and in that time has worked for several independent promotions across the United States, with guest matches in England and Japan. She is known for her banshee gimmick, howling at her opponents and referees who stand in her way, as well as her unusually flexible body that allows her to perform, and be subjected to, modified submission holds.

For two years, between 2008 and 2010, she was a triple crown champion holding the NWA World Women's Championship for the second time, as well as the Shimmer Championship and the NWA Midwest Women's Championship. As well as being a two-time NWA World Champion, she is also a ChickFight tournament winner.

== Professional wrestling career ==
=== Gateway Championship Wrestling (2001–2006) ===
Due to the anonymity which Collins prefers to surround herself in, little is known of her life before she became a wrestler. Growing up as a fan of wrestling, she decided to try it herself in a promotion near her college. In Gateway Championship Wrestling (GCW) she trained under Johnny Greenpeace and Jack Adonis, developing the gimmick of a goth-banshee that she uses throughout her career. Her debut came on July 19, 2001, at Hillsboro Havoc show where she won a mid-card singles match against Christine. She quickly became a regular for their shows, often opening with singles matches against mostly men. After this she went on an undefeated streak, leading to a Four-Way Dance victory at January's Garage Wars, earning her a title shot. Her match for Billy McNeil's Light Heavyweight Championship came the next month at Mardi Gras Mayhem and ended her winning streak. She quickly turned to feuding with Daizee Haze and vicariously with her allies Matt Sydal and Johnny Greenpeace. Her debut with GCW also coincided with Delirious, with whom she quickly formed an alliance under the name Diabolic Khaos. After accompanying each other to matches they debuted as a tag team, Delirious making the pin in their first match at Season's Beatings in November 2001 against Sydal's team, Operation Shamrock.

In May 2002 the pair aided Nikki Strychnine in an Exploding Barbed Wire and joined his Ministry of Hate, helping him retain his GCW Championship while Strychnine returned the favor and assisted MsChif in her feud with Haze, constantly involving himself in their matches. This reached a head at February 2003's Locked N' Loaded when another disqualification led Haze's ally, Johnny Greenpeace, to demand a tag team match between the two pairings and due to the stipulation agreed whoever made the pinfall (including MsChif) would take Strychnine's GCW Championship. Despite her alliance, MsChif was hungry for gold and constantly refused to tag in Strychnine lest he made the pinfall, eventually after the match descended into chaos with both MsChif and Strychnine pinning Greenpeace and Haze, respectively but as Strychnine and Haze were the legal pair he retained the belt. Things went awry the next day at Desoto when Strychnine's enemy, Jack Adonis, noticed his affections for MsChif and hit her with a chair during a title match. When Strychnine checked on her, she demanded he defend his title rather than concern himself with her and replied to his declaration of love with a slap making him easy for Adonis to pin and win the title. MsChif broke away from the Ministry of Hate afterward, attacking Strychnine after the match and engaging in a feud with him under his new gimmick of Nikodemus Ravendark, a brooding heartbroken poet. The feud culminated at GCW's 3rd Anniversary with MsChif pinning Ravendark and him taking absence after.

While Strychnine was away, she challenged for the GCW Light Heavyweight Championship numerous times, eventually picking up the belt in May 2003 in a three-way dance against Makaze and former Ministry of Hate companion OuTtKaSt. She defended the title regularly, including a two out of three falls match against Sydal. During her tenure as champion she mentored the tag team of Nightbreed (Jackal and Cabal) and used them to continue to wage war on Greenpeace and Haze. Strychnine soon returned and by July 2003 was engaged in a feud with Diabolic Khaos, using his GCW Championship to compete against Delirious as a way to get to MsChif. At Adults Only 22 MsChif successfully defended her belt against Haze and later in the evening Strychnine and Delirious had a rematch over the GCW Championship. During the match powder was used as a weapon making it hard to see and MsChif swung her title belt accidentally knocking Delirious out with it before hitting Strychnine, but he fell over Delirious to pin him, regaining the championship. After several other meetings (in tag team matches and through managers) Strychnine finally had his chance to take revenge on MsChif when he was booked in a champion versus champion match at Challenge of Champions III. MsChif mocked Strychnine's former affections, hugging him but slapping him straight after and fetching the ring announcer's table which she soon found herself going through with a crucifix powerbomb; Strychnine feigned sympathy by pretending to carry her back to the dressing room only to tombstone piledrive her to win the match and take both belts.

The feud between MsChif and Nikki Strychnine was voted the company's feud of the year, with MsChif also placing third best wrestler of the year. Her last match, at Judgement Night in March 2004 saw her wrestle in a three stages three-way match with OuTtKaSt and Shawn Almighty where she won the last portion of the match, a ladder match. She officially left the company in 2005 when she was taken off the roster but made a return in May 2006 for the company's Sixth Anniversary event before unsuccessfully challenging former protege Jackal for the Light Heavyweight Championship the next month at Raging Heat. She made one last appearance in November's Holiday Havoc show, wrestling Sean Vincent in the penultimate match of the evening.

=== National Wrestling Alliance ===
==== Feuding with Daizee Haze (2004) ====
For 2004 MsChif fought almost exclusively for Independent Wrestling Association Mid-South (IWA:Mid-South) entering into a feud with Daizee Haze. MsChif lost her January debut match but picked up a victory in her next singles match with Haze; Haze retaliated by teaming up with Mickie Knuckles to defeat MsChif and Allison Danger at Simply The Best V. MsChif defeated her tag team partner in the first round of a tournament to crown the first NWA Midwest Women's Champion before losing to eventual winner Lacey in the first semi-final. MsChif's attempt at a return victory came up short at A Butcher Loose In The Highland the following month. She found success against her rival Haze and Knuckles in a three-way dance the following week at the annual King of the Deathmatch event which led to a series of wins raising her status until in October she twice challenged Mercedes Martinez for the NWA Midwest Championship. Losing by disqualification made her angry enough to interfere in Martinez's match against Mickie Knuckles two nights later at the Eighth Anniversary Show, demanding a rematch which ended in a double count out and leading to an intense feud with Knuckles the following year. MsChif closed out the year losing to Haze via disqualification at a show for NWA No Limits.

==== Mickie Knuckles and the Midwest Championship (2004–2006) ====
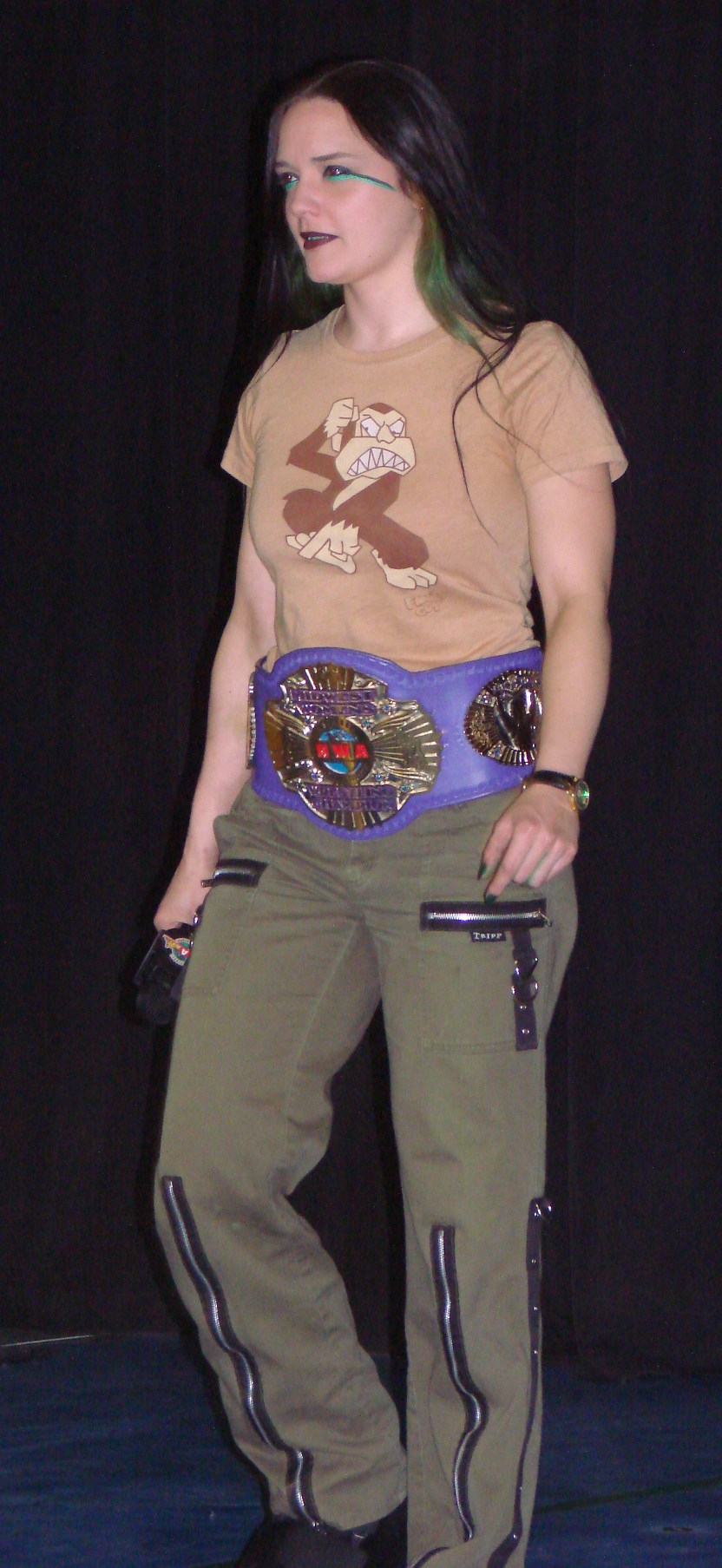
MsChif in her second reign as NWA Midwest Champion

MsChif's last match of 2004 saw Mickie Knuckles fail to gain a revenge victory in a no disqualification match for IWA's Merry Funkin' Christmas show. Going into 2005, MsChif's feud with Knuckles intensified into a savage battle which was waged for over half of the year. MsChif opened the year by continuing her dominance over Knuckles in a submission match and again in another no disqualification match for NWA No Limits. MsChif then took part in a six-way elimination match for the combined NWA Midwest/IWA Mid-South Championship where, although she lost out to Daizee Haze she was the last eliminated. After the match she continued her dominance over Knuckles at IWA East Coast in a standard singles match before returning to Mid-South for another win over her in a first blood match for April Bloodshowers. Knuckles picked up her first singles victory over MsChif at the end of the month in a steel cage match. The loss did not prevent her from wrestling for NWA Midwest on May 7 in an NWA Midwest/IWA Mid-South Title match where she defeated the incumbent Haze.

Her first title defense came the following month in a three-way dance at the ECW Arena ending in Knuckles picking up the victory and the belt. The match led to some contention outside of the ring as NWA Midwest promoter Ed Chuman vetoed the title change claiming the match was sanctioned only by IWA:Mid-South. Ian Rotten asserted Knuckles's right to the title which led to the belt being split and MsChif reigning now as solely the NWA Midwest Champion. After a successful title defense with NWA Midwest, the two champions were placed in a unification match that ended in double disqualification leaving the belts split. In September, MsChif's former rival Haze reignited their feud to challenge for her title but came up short. On the NWA 57th Annual Convention, Haze tried to prove herself still worthy of the belt when she, alongside TJ Dalton, picked up a victory over Diabolic Khaos in a mixed tag match. After the loss, MsChif was forced to put her belt on the line in a match where Diabolic Khaos teamed up again in a 'Winner Takes All' tag team steel cage match with Delirious's NWA Midwest X Division Championship also contested. The November match saw Haze and Matt Sydal walk away with their respective championships.

By 2006 MsChif would wrestle less frequently for NWA affiliates as she began to work in other promotions. When she did wrestle with them again though, it was in February for IWA:Mid-South's Payback where she tried to claim back the IWA Mid-South Championship from Knuckles but was unsuccessful as the match ended in another stalemate, this time via a double pin. Her next match, at April's We're No Joke, was a confusing affair where she teamed with IWA Mid-South champion Mickie Knuckles against Vanessa Kraven and NWA Midwest Champion Daizee Haze where both titles were on the line and if one team survived they would face each other in a singles match to decide the winner. In the event Haze eliminated herself with MsChif after a German suplex pin led to both being pinned, after this MsChif sprayed green mist at Kraven allowing Knuckles to take advantage and temporarily reunify the two belts.

==== World Championship (2007–2010) ====
With the NWA Midwest/IWA Mid-South Championship out of her reach, MsChif turned to the NWA World Women's Championship, successfully wrestling Christie Ricci to win her first world title on January 27, 2007. While MsChif had been gunning for the title, her nemesis Mickie Knuckles had lost the NWA Midwest Championship to Josie in the first week of the year, a belt which MsChif still desired. At an NWA Midwest event in March, both Josie and MsChif agreed to a crown versus crown match where both titles were on the line with a special guest referee—Knuckles. Having problems with both competitors, Knuckles was not an impartial official sparring with both members early on. After refusing to count both pinfalls at different points in the match, Josie declared herself the winner after MsChif was down for a ten count and grabbed the belt. A tug of war ensued between her and Knuckles until the referee let go, causing the belt to smack into Josie's face stunning her enough for MsChif to use the Desecrator to win the match. Afterward Knuckles claimed MsChif owed her for the win, which MsChif replied to with green mist. MsChif became the first woman to hold both the NWA Midwest and World Championship.

MsChif held her World Championship until May when she was involved in another champion versus champion match, losing to AWA Japan Champion Amazing Kong with both belts on the line. A rematch between the two in September, exclusively for the NWA belt, headlined the NWA No Limits 3rd Anniversary Show but MsChif failed to win back her world championship. Kong continued to defend the belt but when she signed for Total Nonstop Action Wrestling (TNA), who had severed working relations with the NWA, the decision was made to pass the belt back to MsChif, who won it in April 2008 via countout under a special stipulation to retain Kong's stature. She successfully defended it the following month in a lauded match against Cheerleader Melissa, with whom she was already feuding, and Ashley Lane among others. The following year, MsChif defended the World Championship at NWA Charlotte's Valentine's Day themed inaugural show, Thorns & Roses, in the penultimate match of the evening. With Daffney in her corner, she once again wrestled Kong and saved herself from the Awesome Bomb by using her green mist, disqualifying herself to retain the belt in the process. On July 24, 2010, MsChif lost the NWA World Women's Championship to Tasha Simone, ending her reign at 818 days.

=== Shimmer and Ring of Honor ===
==== MelisChif (2005–2010) ====
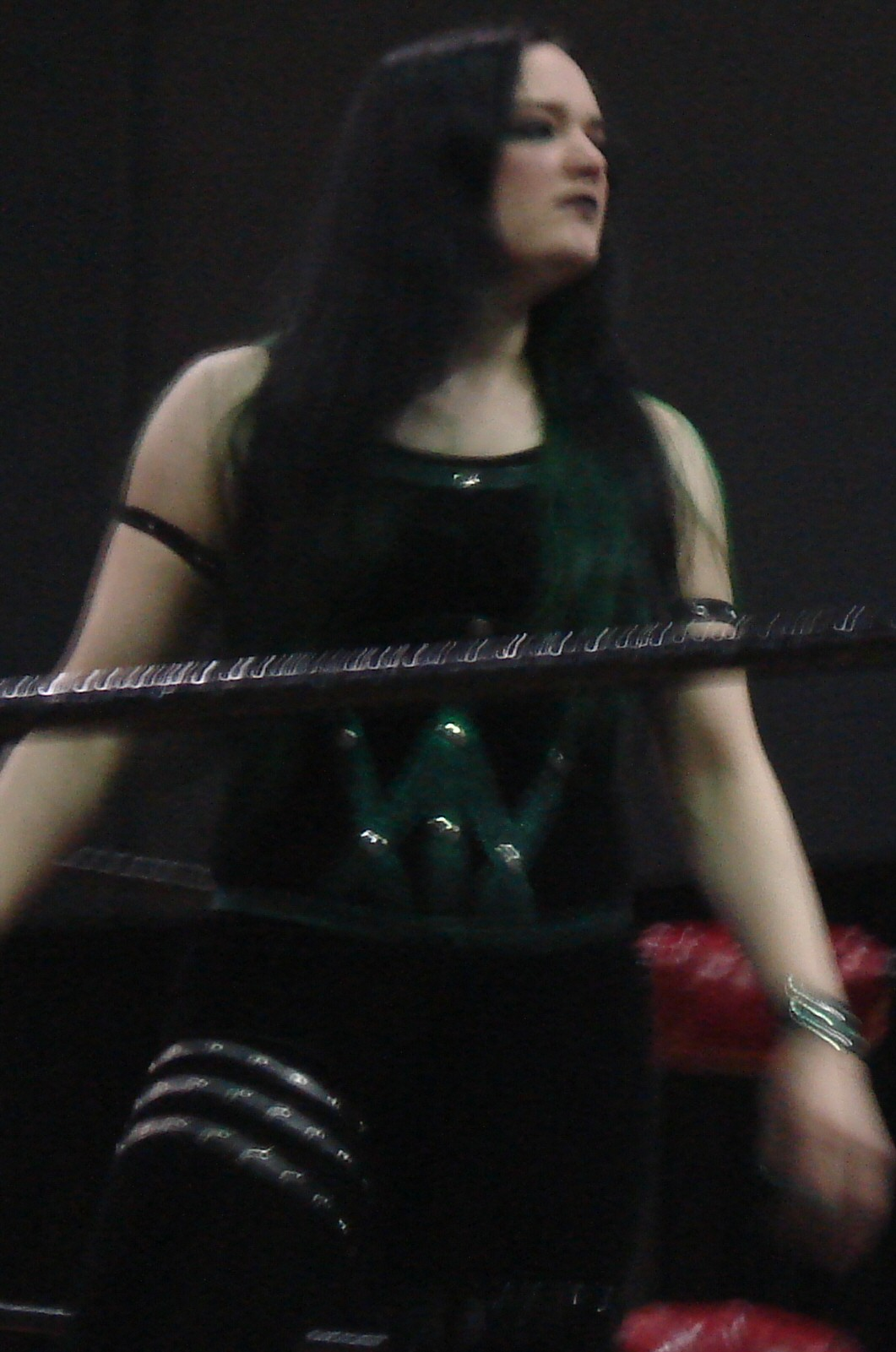
MisChif in January 2007.

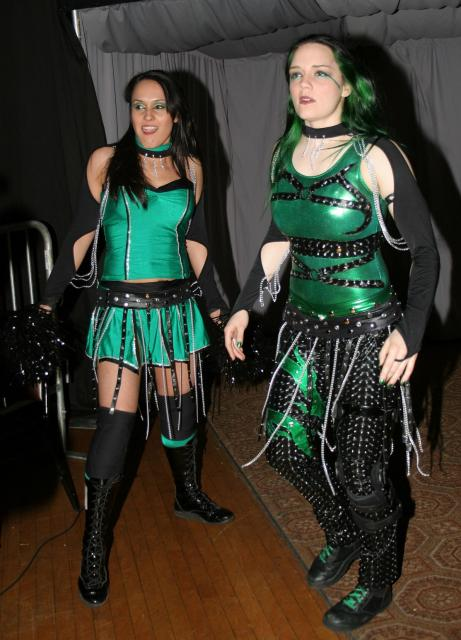
Cheerleader Melissa and MsChif had a lengthy rivalry with which turned into mutual respect with the two forming a tag team.

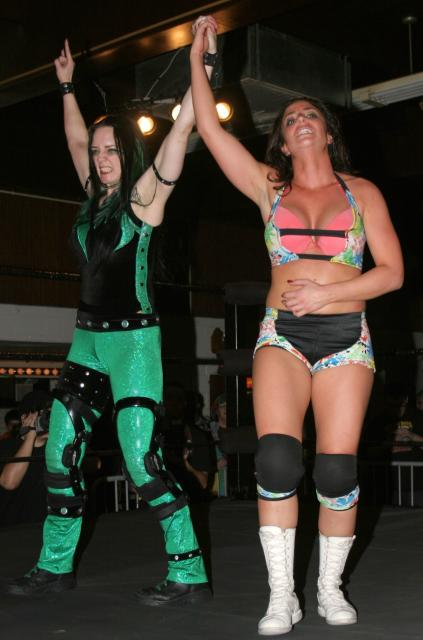
MisChif beside Serena Deeb in Ring of Honor at Vol.22 after Deeb was attacked by Sara Del Rey.

In November 2005 MsChif was invited to take part in the debut show of Shimmer Women Athletes, an all-female wrestling promotion designed to give women a platform for showcasing their in ring ability. She made an instant enemy in her debut match, defeating Cheerleader Melissa. This defeat incurred the wrath of Melissa who distracted MsChif during her Volume 3 match against Lexie Fyfe. The two met for the second time during Volume 4 in Shimmer's first hardcore match. Fought under Falls Count Anywhere rules that saw the two fight through the crowd and onto the streets of Berwyn, Illinois where MsChif was cut open. MsChif tried to use her green mist to dispatch Melissa, but it was blocked with a steel chair, the steel chair would later come in useful as, just before the fight reached half an hour, MsChif was locked in a Kondo Clutch and bent so far over that she was forced to kick herself in the head through the chair which Melissa placed on her spine. MsChif bounced back with a win in her Ring of Honor (ROH) debut at Supercard of Honor I where she won a Shimmer Six Woman Mayhem match, including enemies Melissa and Daizee Haze. The victory over Melissa apparently did not satisfy after the previous loss as she revealed at Volume 5 when she distracted Melissa during a match with Allison Danger making it easy for Melissa to be rolled up and lose the match. The ensuing brawl took the combined effort of most of the locker room to separate the two. Again hardcore rules were used to try and settle the bad blood, this time a Last Woman Standing match which was fought over twenty minutes ending with Melissa unable to stand up after receiving a Desecrator through a steel chair.

Her rivalry with Melissa took a new turn at Volume 7 in October 2006 during a singles match with Rain. When Melissa turned up at ringside she was pushed over by Rain's partner Lacey who was interfering in the match, something the cheerleader did not take kindly to and responded by making the referee notice the foreign object Lacey had given to Rain meaning that MsChif won by disqualification. After Melissa's main event victory, Lacey and Rain (The Minnesota Home Wrecking Crew) assaulted her until MsChif came out to save her. Lacey, annoyed at MsChif's interference, challenged the two to a tag team match at Volume 8 and stormed off, leaving MsChif to stare down Melissa before leaving her to celebrate her victory. Despite both wrestlers' prowess, they were not successful against the experienced Home Wrecking tag team.

In the meantime MsChif put aside her troubles with another former enemy, Daizee Haze, in an attempt to defeat the Minnesota Home Wrecking Crew at ROH's 2007 Driven but again came up short. Back in Shimmer, MsChif teamed up not just with Haze, but also British wrestler Eden Black to take on the newly formed International Home Wrecking Crew with the added teammate of Jetta with MsChif finally securing victory, although it was Haze who gained the pinfall.

Losing their first outing as a tag team did not stop the enemies turned allies, who soon were given the sobriquet MelisChif. They tagged up in Volume 12 to take on the undefeated team of The Experience (Lexie Fyfe and Malia Hosaka). As the match reached its end, Melissa saved MsChif from a double team move and leveled Hosaka with an Air Raid Crash which MsChif followed with her Unhallowed Grace to gain the pin. They teamed up successfully once more for Volume 17 against The Dangerous Angels (Allison Danger and Sara Del Rey). During this match MsChif covered Shimmer Champion Del Rey for longer than a three count while the referee was distracted, leading to MsChif challenging for and winning the Shimmer Championship.

After MsChif won the top title, the team tagged less frequently. Still, at Volume 23 MsChif defended her belt against Serena Deeb. After the match Del Rey, who had since become a villainous character, came to the ring wanting to reclaim the belt followed by Amazing Kong who also wanted a shot at the title. The two both attacked MsChif until Melissa came out to save her. Rather than a Shimmer Championship match, this led to the ad hoc team of Del Rey and Kong teaming against MelisChif at Volume 24 for a chance at the Shimmer Tag Team Championship, which Kong and Del Rey won. Nevertheless, after Melissa defeated Tag Team Champion Nicole Matthews in singles action at Volume 27, the team were given a chance at the titles during Volume 30 but the Canadian NINJAs (Matthews and Portia Perez) defeated the team. Afterwards Melissa announced that following two consecutive tag team losses, she would no longer team with MsChif.

==== Singles competition (2005–present) ====
Aside from her debut upset victory over Cheerleader Melissa, MsChif's singles run in Shimmer grew slowly yet successfully. During Volume 2 she was unexpectedly pinned by Beth Phoenix and lost again at Volume 3 to Lexie Fyfe. MsChif's aforementioned victory in the Ring of Honor, however, set her up on a winning streak in singles matches that lasted through 2006 until Volume 9 in April 2007 that saw her lose to Amazing Kong, a month before she would lose her NWA World Championship to her. During the tournament to crown the first Shimmer champion, MsChif earned a return victory over Fyfe in the first round but lost to Sarah Stock in the quarter-finals; the initial victory led to MelisChif's first victory, over Fyfe and Hosaka, before another tag team loss during Volume 15 with her Scream Queens partner Daffney.

After gaining momentum in her singles matches in Shimmer and ROH MsChif sought, and earned a title match against the inaugural Shimmer Champion, Sara Del Rey with her Volume 17 tag team victory over the Dangerous Angels. During the match MsChif had the champion pinned while the crowd counted for five seconds, but by the time the referee had gained control of the match Del Rey had kicked out; regardless Cheerleader Melissa soon pinned Allison Danger. As Volume 18 opened, MsChif pointed out that she had the Shimmer Champion pinned for more than a three count and demanded a title opportunity which Del Rey, claiming herself to be a fighting champion, readily accepted. In the main event, MsChif was able to successfully use the Desecrator to become the second Shimmer champion. She first defended the belt against Jetta, who won a 21-woman royal rumble for the opportunity and continued to defend it at subsequent shows.

As the Shimmer season closed, MsChif defended her belt in promotions outside of Shimmer. At ROH's Rising Above in November (aired January 2009), she kept Del Rey from regaining the title. In Full Impact Pro's October event, Fallout, Rain unsuccessfully challenged her for the belt. Then Mercedes Martinez, who was undefeated in Full Impact Pro claimed a second title shot, having already been dispatched by MsChif at Shimmer's Volume 20. but at February 2009's Battle of the Belts MsChif proved her dominance once again. In 2009, ROH premiered a weekly television show Ring of Honor Wrestling on HDNet and MsChif made her debut on the eighth episode as part of The Age of the Fall, which she had joined the previous June, and teamed with their leader Jimmy Jacobs in a losing effort to the team of Daizee Haze and former Fall member Delirious. She, however, won a three-way match, opposite Del Rey, by pinning Haze. On November 8, 2009, at the tapings Shimmer's Volume 28 MsChif successfully defended her title in an elimination three-way match against Amazing Kong and LuFisto and in the process gave Kong her first pinfall loss in the company.

On April 11, 2010, at Volume 31, MsChif defended the Shimmer Championship against Australian wrestler Madison Eagles. In an upset victory, Eagles pinned the champion, ending MsChif's reign just shy of two years after 14 successful defenses.

Also MsChif being a female of ROH made her a Women of Honor.

=== Other promotions ===
Having made an impact in IWA:Mid-West and Shimmer Women Athletes MsChif was invited to another all-female promotion, ChickFight, a San Francisco based promotion that held knock-out tournaments. Her first outing was ChickFight IV in April 2006, where she took on Candice LeRae in the first round. After defeating her she progressed onto the semi-final, pinning Lacey before winning her debut tournament with a victory against Mercedes Martinez. In June she competed in ChickFight V and defeated Sumie Sakai in the first round before suffering a semi-final loss to Jazz and she suffered a similar fate at the next two events. At ChickFight VII: The UK vs The USA she defeated British wrestler Jade but lost to eventual winner Cheerleader Melissa in the semi-finals, months after they had tagged together in Shimmer Volume 8. Her final appearance with the company, during the ChickFight VIII saw her fight her way to the final, beating Jetta on the way, before losing to Wesna in the final.

Days before ChickFight VII, MsChif made her first appearance in the London based promotion Real Quality Wrestling (RQW) for their calendar opening No Pain, No Gain event. The triple threat match, which also included Melissa, was for the RQW Women's Championship and was won by defending champion Eden Black. She returned to RQW in June in a ChickFight attraction match that saw two feuds collide at Taking On The World where she tag teamed with Black in a losing effort against Melissa and Jetta.

In August 2006, MsChif took part in Japan's Wrestle Expo 2006. During the event she was given a bye through to the semi-final where defeated Kyoko Kimura to earn a place in the final match. As the other finalist was NWA Women's Pacific/NEO Single Champion Yoshiko Tamura the belt was put on the line but MsChif was unable to secure victory.

As well as these promotions, MsChif has made various one-off and limited appearances for other companies. Perhaps the most famous of these companies was NWA: Total Nonstop Action (NWA:TNA) for their televised program TNA Xplosion in a losing effort against longtime enemy Daizee Haze.

On October 8, 2012, MsChif made her first appearance in Japan in six years, when she main evented Joshi 4 Hope IV, unsuccessfully challenging Hailey Hatred for the Remix Pro Women's Championship.

=== Ring of Honor pt.2 (2011–2015) ===
During years 2011 to 2015 in Ring of Honor (ROH) MsChif feuded with talent such as Maria Kanellis and had matches in the ROH Women of Honor division against talent such as Sara Del Rey, Allysin Kay, Leah Von Dutch, Mia Yim, Veda Scott, Jenny Rose, Athena, Scarlett Bordeaux, Cherry Bomb, Kasey Ray and Jessie Brooks until she later on departed from ROH in 2015.

== Personal life ==
Collins graduated from college as a genetics scientist. Along with her work in professional wrestling as MsChif, she works at a microbiology laboratory. In October 2010 she was featured in the PBS series "The Secret Life of Scientists and Engineers".

In June 2013, Collins and fellow professional wrestler Aaron Frobel, who wrestles as Michael Elgin, announced their engagement, and they married the following month on July 4. On September 4, 2015, Collins gave birth to her and Frobel's first child, a boy named Jax. The couple divorced on November 23, 2020.

== Championships and accomplishments ==
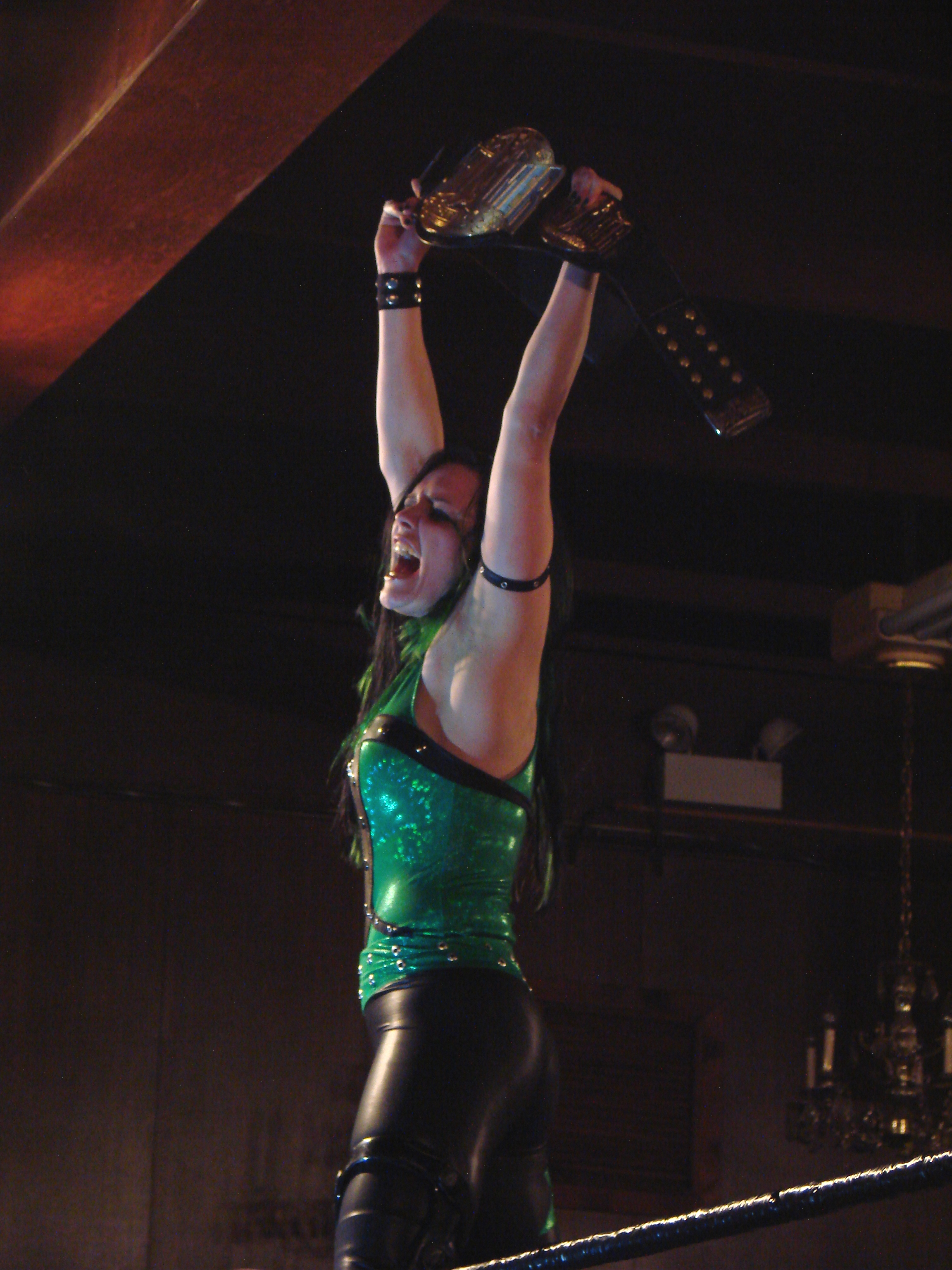
MsChif during her reign as Shimmer Champion

- ChickFight
  - ChickFight IV
- Coastal Wrestling Association
  - CWA Tag Team Championship (1 time) – with Cindy Rogers
- Gateway Championship Wrestling
  - GCW Light Heavyweight Championship (1 time)
- National Wrestling Alliance
  - NWA World Women's Championship (2 times)
  - NWA Midwest/IWA Mid-South Women's Championship (1 time)^{[a]}
  - NWA Midwest Women's Championship (2 times)^{1}
- Pro Wrestling Illustrated
  - Ranked No. 4 of the top 50 female wrestlers in the PWI Female 50 in 2009
- Shimmer Women Athletes
  - Shimmer Championship (1 time)
- Zero1 Pro Wrestling USA
  - Zero1 Pro Wrestling USA Midwest Women's Championship (1 time)

== Footnotes ==
^{1} First reign as IWA Mid-South/NWA Midwest Women's Champion saw the title split up after her title loss was deemed unsanctioned by NWA Midwest and MsChif continued to hold the NWA Midwest Women's Championship. During the second reign, the title was renamed "Zero1 Pro Wrestling USA Midwest Women's Championship".
