= Wesna =

Croatian German professional wrestler

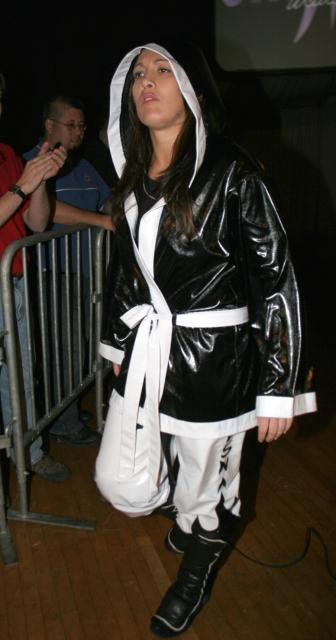
- Wesna in April 2008

Personal information
- Born: June 26, 1983 (age 43) Zagreb, SR Croatia, SFR Yugoslavia

Professional wrestling career
- Ring name(s): Wesna; Wesna Busic
- Billed height: 5 ft 10 in (1.78 m)
- Billed weight: 143 lb (65 kg; 10.2 st)
- Billed from: Berlin, Germany; Zagreb, Croatia
- Trained by: Crazy Sexy Mike; Ahmed Chaer; 2 Cold Scorpio
- Debut: 1998

Wesna Busic (born June 26, 1983) is a Croatian German professional wrestler. She mostly wrestled in Germany, but also over all of Europe as well as in Japan and America.

Despite being a female, Wesna often wrestles men and has won championships from male wrestlers, including holding the Athletik Club Wrestling's (ACW) Tag Team Championship with Crazy Sexy Mike. She won the eighth ChickFight tournament in England, which started her long feud with American wrestler Cheerleader Melissa, along with other exclusively female championships such as the National Wrestling Alliance's German version of the Women's Championship and German Stampede Wrestling's World Women's Championship.

== Early life ==
Vesna Bušić was born in Zagreb, Croatia. Growing up in Germany, Busic became a fan of professional wrestling at an early age. When unable to find a professional wrestling school to train herself in, she turned to both amateur wrestling and boxing, both of which later influenced her shootfighting wrestling style.

== Professional wrestling career ==
=== German Stampede Wrestling (2001–2010) ===
==== Female competition ====
Wesna has been with German Stampede Wrestling (GSW) since its inception, successfully pinning Jazzy Bi on their maiden event Night In Motion I: New Heroes in September 2001. In each respective corner featured the two women's allies, Crazy Sexy Mike and Michael Kovac respectively, who contested the main event of the evening under No Holds Barred rules with Kovac picking up the win. The following August Wesna took part in the main event of Night In Motion II: Rising Stars as the two sets of allies took part in a mixed tag team match; once again Wesna and Crazy Sexy Mike were victorious. The team picked up another victory over Matt Summers and Blue Nikita, the latter of whom Wesna would build a highly established feud with, before Wesna tasted her first defeat at Night In Motion III: Reach The Max when her and Blue Nikita lost to Jazzy Bi.

Though this was a loss for her, Wesna went on an eight-year undefeated streak in singles matches in GSW. In July, 2003 GSW held a Ladies Tournament at Summer Breeze culminating in the penultimate event of the two-part event. Wesna met Blue Nikita for the first time in singles action in GSW and defeated her to win the tournament. Following this Wesna met American wrestler Cheerleader Melissa and continued her winning streak, which acted as a precursour to an intercontinental feud between the two in the latter half of the decade. Wesna cemented her international dominance by defeating noted American brawler Mickie Knuckles at Night in Motion IV: Whatever It Takes in February 2006 and two months later, with Nora Greenwald as the special guest referee, pinned English wrestler Nikita at International Impact III. With the female division growing, GSW decided to create a Ladies Championship in 2007 and the undefeated Wesna was booked in a match with April Hunter at International Impact IV in March 2007 and became the inaugural champion.

As champion, she defended her belt against English talent Jetta and American wrestler Allison Danger. This led to a meeting with longstanding rival Blue Nikita and at Night in Motion XI: Pure Passion, in a No Disqualification match, Wesna staved off the threat from the challenger. Nikita earned a rematch while Wesna was ill and it took place at Night in Motion XII: Sold Out ended in a draw as a result of double knockout. Despite this draw, Blue Nikita was overlooked as Breakthrough Champion Steve Douglas had set on a mission to become the GSW Triple Crown Champion and unite all the belts. In a Winner Takes All Championship match, Wesna was defeated in the main event of Night in Motion XIII: Lucky 13 and lost her belt. Her attempt to regain it was in a Four Way match, also including Awesome Kong, which was thwarted by her nemesis Blue Nikita who walked away with the title. In February 2009 Wesna managed to best Blue Nikita, but only by count out (for which titles do not change hands) and Wesna could not recreate a victory in their Spartan Death Match two months later, acquiescing to her first defeat in GSW singles competition after eight chair shots.

On June 4, 2016, at GWF Mystery Mayhem 4, Wesna managed to win the GWF Ladies Title in a three-way match against Blue Nikita and Carmel Jacob.

==== Male competition ====
After her two wins with Crazy Sexy Mike Wesna became part of the Decent Society stable, losing her first match with them in 2004. She lost again with the team, representing GSW in an interpromotional feud against wXw, on the weaker side of a five on three handicap match in 2006. Wesna found herself kicked out of the group by 2009 and took revenge by teaming up with her long-standing rival, Blue Nikita, though the impromptu team lost to the experience of Decent Society.

=== Athletik Club Wrestling (2001–2008) ===
Wesna joined the Baden-Württemberg based promotion Athletik Club Wrestling (ACW) in December 2001. She made an instant impact with her GSW Decent Society stablemate Crazy Sexy Mike by winning the ACW World Tag Team Championship on her company debut at Wild Christmas 2001. The victory came against the solitary champion Seargent as his partner, Master Blaster, was not fit for the match. Three months later the team lost their championships to Ahmed Chaer and Flyin' Dragon and were unable to win them back, winning by count out only, at a special tag team themed Saturday Night 13.

Wesna's feud with Blue Nikita spilled over into ACW during an interpromotional event with the European Wrestling Council (EWC) in 2003. Wesna once again secured victory over her Greek enemy In November she teamed up with the EWC Commissioner in a mixed tag match, defeating her nemesis again who teamed with Matthias Treu. The two met again at Wild Christmas 2007 for Wesna's Real Quality Wrestling (RQW) Women's Championship where once again she was successful leading to Wesna's final ACW match at Riptide II in February 2008 with another successful RQW title match against Jetta.

=== ChickFight (2007–2008) ===
Cheerleader Melissa performing the Kudo Driver on Wesna during their 45-minute draw

In 2007, Wesna was invited to take part in the UK based knock-out tournament ChickFight. At ChickFight VIII made an instant impact in Gloucester by dominating monster heel, or villain, Pandora and then squashed Jade, despite interference from partner Kelly Adams, to make her way through to the final. In the final she met American wrestler MsChif in a ChickFight Rules match where the two wrestled all around the building, including through the bar area, both forcing the other underneath a beer tap. Wesna was pinned in the middle of the ring, but the referee was blinded by MsChif's Green Mist allowing Wesna to recover and use her CB4 Driver to win the match. By winning, Wesna earned a shot at the TransAtlantic Championship, resparking her feud with champion Cheerleader Melissa, after Wesna's win at GSW International Impact I. Despite Melissa coming out straight after the final against MsChif, Wesna put on a competitive showing but the mixture of tables and ladders bested her and Melissa retained her belt. The two met again the following June at ChickFight IX: Our Final Chance where, owing to their growing rivalry, neither was entered into the tournament. Their solitary match of the event, with Wesna's Real Quality Wrestling (RQW) Women's Championship on the line, was fought under ChickFight Rules. After fighting in and out of the ring, even spilling outside of the building into Orpington, Kent, neither could successfully pin the other and the match went to a forty-five-minute time limit draw. Still the two were tied 1–1, with one match drawn and so a deciding match was to be held at ChickFight X but this ended in controversy when Wesna claimed that her tap out was merely an attempt to grab the rope for a rope break; their rematch later that night saw Wesna pick up the victory leaving them drawn again at 2-2.

ChickFight XI was originally slated to be a two out of three falls match to find a decisive victory until Melissa pulled out due to injury. After Melissa's injury, Wesna was rebooked in a tag team match alongside former rival Jetta where the two beat Mancunian twins Team Blossom. Later in the evening Wesna brought her longstanding rivalry with Blue Nikita to England with a ChickFight Rules match where the two brawled around the venue for twenty minutes with Nikita eventually picking up the victory. The day before she appeared in a ChickFight attraction match in Rotherham, South Yorkshire for Shooting Star Wrestling also defeating Blue Nikita.

=== Shimmer Women Athletes (2008–2009) ===
Wesna made her debut with American all-female promotion Shimmer Women Athletes April 26, 2008, at Volume 17 where she lost to Mercedes Martinez in a hard-hitting match after a Fisherman Buster and despite losing, shook hands with Martinez after as a sign of respect to present her as a fan favourite. In Volume 18 she lost again in a match of giants against Amazing Kong after her somersault from the corner was caught into a sitout powerbomb but received a standing ovation for her efforts, regardless. She returned to Shimmer later in the year for Volume 21 and picked up her first victory in the promotion over Amber O'Neal but lost her next match to LuFisto.

At Volume 23, in May 2009, Shimmer Women Athletes brought Wesna's feud with Melissa from Germany and England to the United States. The company preluded the match with a video package showing their matches in ChickFight and announced that the winner would go on to face the Shimmer Champion at a later event. Similar to their 45-minute draw, the two traded forearm shots and ended on their knees trading slaps but unlike that match there would be a winner this time. Towards the end of the bout, Annie Social came to the ring to distract Melissa allowing Wesna to use her CB4 Driver to pick up the victory, turning Wesna into a villainous character. She warmed up for the championship match by picking up a return victory over LuFisto with the help of more interference from Social. Wesna lost her championship match at Volume 25 despite still having Social in her corner and, owing to the controversy of their previous match, Melissa challenged Wesna again in Volume 26 in a Knockout/Submission match where Melissa picked up the victory, making them level once more. On November 8 at the tapings of Volume 27 Wesna debuted in the tag team division along with Melanie Cruise winning against the former SHIMMER Tag Team Champions Ashley Lane and Nevaeh. As part of Volume 28 however she lost to Nikki Roxx.

=== Other promotions and retirement (2003–2010) ===
In 2003, Wesna took part in the European Wrestling Association (EWA) debut show, Weltmeisterschaft 2003 (World Championship 2003), where she took on Missy Blond to crown the inaugural EWA European Ladies Champion. After winning the belt, she first defended it at Weltmeisterschaft 2004 against longstanding rival Blue Nikita and was successful. Nikita picked up a return victory of sorts the following night in a mixed tag team match alongside Robert Ray Kreuzer, while Wesna had frequent partner Crazy Sexy Mike with her, but it was a non-title match. Soon after, in August, Blue Nikita challenged for the title and won it from Wesna. Wesna challenged for it again the following August in Italy and lost her first match but won the second one and secured the title. Wesna went on to hold this belt for a record 525 days including a winner takes all tag team match for her Women's Championship and the EWA World Middleweight Championship which she helped win for Barish Günay from Ahmed Chaer. She earned the belt world status after defending it against Hikaru in Tokyo in September 2006.

In 2007, Wesna competed as a gaijin in various matches with Zero-1 Max and their sister promotion Pro Wrestling Sun. On January 14 wrestling for the latter promotion, she lost her EWA Women's Championship after another match with Hikaru. She then found herself tag teaming with fellow foreigners Amazing Kong and Panther Crow for Zero-1, picking up successive victories in January over Nanae Takahashi and Saki Maemura who teamed with both Hikaru and Natsuki☆Taiyo in respective bouts. In the second contest it was Wesna who scored the pinfall over Taiyo. She also had a tag match against Takahashi and Maemura alongside Toshie Uematsu which ended in a time limit draw and a rematch was held at May's Everlasting where Wesna secured victory by pinning Takahashi. With this victory she placed herself in contention for the vacant AWA Superstars of Wrestling World Women's Championship in a three way match including previous holder Takahashi and the contending Kong but Takahashi re-won the belt.

In June 2004, Wesna was invited to be part of an eight-woman tournament to crown the first European Championess in Wrestling School Austria (WSA). Though she dispatched Jersey in four minutes and Vampiria in the second round, she came up short against Biker Bea in the final. She earned a rematch for the belt in a Five Way Elimination match, dismissing KKK and Blue Nikita from the match. It took her only four minutes to claim the European Championship from Biker Bea and she would hold the belt for over four years. As well as being champion for the company, she brought her feud with Blue Nikita there in November, losing to her in a singles match but picking up a tag team victory over her.

In June 2007 she made her first appearance for London based promotion Real Quality Wrestling. In nearby Essex she wrestled a Four-Way Elimination match for the RQW Women's Championship against holder Eden Black, Jetta and Amazing Kong, managing to best them all to win the belt. She returned to defend the belt at RQW's annual No Pain, No Gain event in January 2008 against Jetta with Sweet Saraya as the referee. It came to an abrupt end when Jetta walked out, resulting in a count out, due to a legitimate injury that caused her to collapse afterwards, leading to their aforementioned match in ACW's Riptide II where Wesna won again. In July of that year, in Vienna, she put up the RQW Championship, along with her WSA Women's European Championship against the World Association of Women's Wrestling (WAWW) British Champion Sweet Saraya in a triple crown match. Despite the torrential rain, the two insisted on wrestling with Saraya eventually winning all three championships. Following the match, an infuriated Wesna attacked the referee with a Samoan drop and consequently had her wrestling license suspended for three months.

On April 11, 2010, Busic announced her retirement from professional wrestling due to an injury.

=== Return (2016–present) ===
Wesna returned in March 2016 at the German Wrestling Federation in what seemed to be a one night only return. She defeated the team of Pollyanna and Jamie Hayter alongside Blue Nikita and then challenged for the GSW Ladies Titles which was defended at GWF. She won the title in a triple threat match in June 2016 against Blue Nikita and Carmel Jacob and held it until October 2016 when she lost it against Saraya Knight.

Since September 2016 she is promoting female-only events at GWF under the moniker "Revolution" (formerly "Women's Wrestling Revolution"). In September 2017 GWF abandoned the GSW Ladies Title and introduced the GWF Women's Title in a tournament. Wesna lost in the semi-finals against Katey Harvey who also beat Jazzy Gabert in the finals to become the first-ever GWF Women's Champion. In May 2018 Wesna challenged Toni Storm for the PROGRESS Women's Title at "Revolution 8", Germany's first-ever all female wrestling evening event. Also this was the first time that the PROGRESS Women's Title was defended in Germany.

== Championships and accomplishments ==
- Athletik Club Wrestling
  - ACW World Tag Team Championship (1 time) – with Crazy Sexy Mike
- ChickFight
  - ChickFight VIII
- European Wrestling Association
  - EWA Women's European/World Championship (2 times)
- German Stampede Wrestling
  - GSW Ladies Championship (2 times) (current)
  - Summer Breeze Ladies Tournament (2003)
- Pro Wrestling Zero-1 Max
  - NSG World Women's Championship (1 time)
- NWA Germany
  - NWA Germany Women's Championship (1 time)
- Pro Wrestling Illustrated
  - Ranked No. 33 of the top 50 female wrestlers in the PWI Female 50 in 2009
- Real Quality Wrestling
  - RQW Women's Championship (1 time)
- Wrestling School Austria
  - WSA European Women's Championship (1 time)
