= Christie Ricci =

American professional wrestler

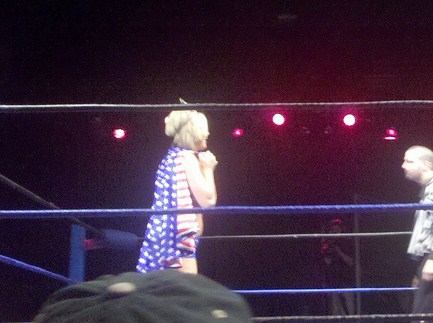
- Glory (Christe Ricci) at a Wrestlicious show on May 28, 2010 vs. Toni the Top

Personal information
- Born: November 11, 1982 (age 43) Jackson, Mississippi, U.S.

Professional wrestling career
- Ring name(s): Christie Ricci; Glory; Gloria
- Billed height: 5 ft 10 in (1.78 m)
- Billed weight: 160 lb (73 kg)
- Trained by: Leilani Kai
- Debut: 2000

Christie Ricci (born November 11, 1982) is the ring name of an American professional wrestler, also known as Glory.

After being trained by Leilani Kai, Ricci made her debut in June 2002, and began competing on the independent circuit. She won both the LLF Championship and the XWF Women's Championship, before being sidelined with a knee injury in 2004. After her return, Ricci continued to wrestle on the independent circuit, competing in All Pro Wrestling's first ChickFight tournament, and on October 8, 2005, she won the NWA World Women's Championship, which she held until January 2007. She also appeared at Shimmer's first shows in November 2005. She later appeared for the Wrestlicious promotion as Glory and was the inaugural Wrestlicious Champion.

== Professional wrestling career ==
After completing two years of college, Christie decided to transfer to Georgia Institute of Technology, so that she could attend a wrestling school in Atlanta. Weeks before she was to move to Atlanta, however, she met Leilani Kai, and instead decided to stay in Nashville to train with Kai.

After being trained by Kai, she debuted as a wrestler in June 2002 using the ring name Christie Ricci. That year, she was named Rookie of the Year by the Professional Girl Wrestling Association. For the next two years, Ricci competed for numerous independent promotions, and won both the Mexican's promotion Lucha Libre Femenil (LLF)'s LLF Championship, by defeating Miss Janeth, and the Xcitement Wrestling Federation's Women's Championship.

In February 2004, Ricci reaggravated a previous knee injury in Mexico, and underwent surgery. She was briefly sidelined while recuperating. She returned to Mexico in July and August 2004. In October 2004, Ricci competed in at All Pro Wrestling (APW)'s Halloween Hell Night 1 show, in which she participated in the "ChickFight Tournament". She defeated Tiffany in the first round, but lost to Cheerleader Melissa in Round Two. She competed for APW at Halloween Hell Night 2 the following night as well, defeating Hailey Hatred, Candace LeRae and Nikki Roxx in a four-way elimination match.

In early 2005, Ricci competed for New Breed Wrestling (NWS) and Top Rope Wrestling (TRW). On February 18, Ricci competed in a gauntlet match in NBW; the match was won by Daizee Haze, and also contained Josie, ODB, and Traci Brooks. On May 24, Ricci was defeated by Lollipop at a TRW show. From August 14 to 31, 2005, Ricci travelled to the US army bases in South Korea, Japan, Guam, and Hawaii for Armed Forces Entertainment. On October 8, 2005, Ricci won the NWA World Women's Championship by defeating the reigning champion, Lexie Fyfe and Tasha Simone in a three-way match at the NWA 57th Anniversary Show. She appeared on the first two DVD volumes of Shimmer Women Athletes. The first volume was taped on November 6, 2005, and she lost to Lexie Fyfe. The second volume was taped the same day, and Ricci defeated Amber O'Neal.

Throughout 2006 and 2007, Ricci continued to compete for independent promotions, including USA Championship Wrestling, CWA Championship Wrestling and Memphis Wrestling. After holding the NWA World Women's Championship for over a year, Ricci dropped it to MsChif on January 27, 2007. In mid-2007, Ricci began competing regularly for Women's Extreme Wrestling (WEW). Her first appearance for WEW was on May 5, when she competed in two matches, losing to Talia Madison in the first and Jazz in the second. She also began competing for Southern All-Star Wrestling, defeating Lollipop in her first match for the promotion. She continued competing for both promotions throughout 2008, wrestling people including Cindy Rogers, Naomi Banks, and Angel Orsini. In July 2008, she returned to the LLF in Mexico.

In early 2009, Ricci debuted for Wrestlicious, a women's wrestling organization owned by Jay Vargas and Jimmy Hart, under the name Glory. On the April 7, 2010, episode of Wrestlicious Takedown, Glory alongside Felony were the last two girls standing in a 20-girl "Hoedown Throwdown" Battle Royal to determine the top two contenders for the Wrestlicious Championship. On the May 24 episode of Wrestlicious Takedown, Glory defeated Felony to win the Wrestlicious Championship, becoming the inaugural champion.

== Personal life ==
Ricci grew up in Clinton, Mississippi, where she knew fellow professional wrestler, Ted DiBiase Jr., meeting him at a Sunday school class. It was through DiBiase Jr. that she became a fan of professional wrestling and his father, "The Million Dollar Man" Ted DiBiase. Ricci cites DiBiase, Dynamite Kid, Bret Hart, Eddie Guerrero and Chris Benoit as her favorite wrestlers. She was also a fan of Eddie Gilbert.

Ricci began bodybuilding when she was 17, and plans on competing in bodybuilding competitions, and doing fitness modelling. Ricci graduated from college with a Bachelor of Business in 2004 and completed her Master's degree in Business in 2007.

== Championships and accomplishments ==
- Lucha Libre Femenil
  - LLF Championship (1 time)
- National Wrestling Alliance
  - NWA World Women's Championship (1 time)
- Professional Girl Wrestling Association
  - Rookie of the Year (2002)
- Pro Wrestling Illustrated
  - Ranked No. 36 of the top 50 female wrestlers in the PWI Female 50 in 2008
- Wrestlicious
  - Wrestlicious Championship (1 time)
- Xcitement Wrestling Federation
  - XWF Women's Championship (1 time)
