= International Home Wrecking Crew =

Professional wrestling tag team

Stable
- Members: Rain; Jetta; Lacey (manager)
- Name(s): Minnesota Home Wrecking Crew; International Home Wrecking Crew
- Debut: 20 December 2003
- Disbanded: 8 November 2009

The International Home Wrecking Crew (formerly known as the Minnesota Home Wrecking Crew) was a professional wrestling stable that appeared primarily in Shimmer Women Athletes and other independent promotions. As the Minnesota Home Wrecking Crew, former enemies and Minnesotans Rain and Lacey teamed up as a tag team in 2003. English wrestler Jetta was later welcomed into the group. Lacey soon retired from professional wrestling and the International Home Wrecking Crew became a tag team, but in May 2009 Lacey reappeared in a managerial capacity for the team. Their last match was in November 2009, after which time Rain mainly wrestled in Mexico and Jetta retired. Their name is an homage to the Minnesota Wrecking Crew.

== History ==
=== Minnesota Home Wrecking Crew ===
==== IWA: Mid-South (2002–2004) ====
Lacey and Rain, both of Minnesota extraction, spent most of 2002 feuding with each other in Independent Wrestling Association Mid-South (IWA: Mid-South) as well as Combat Zone Wrestling (CZW), Minnesota Independent Wrestling and others. However, by the end of 2003, at IWA: Mid-South's Stylin' and Profilin' the duo found themselves teaming together, in a losing effort, to Daizee Haze and Mickie Knuckles and again the following year at You Gotta See This picking up a return victory.

==== Women's Erotic Wrestling (2006–2007) ====
As well as making individual appearances for the company, the Minnesota Home Wrecking Crew have wrestled twice for Women's Erotic Wrestling. In July 2006 the duo defeated the team of Shantelle Taylor and Pussy Willow at Nude and Nasty. The following year, at May's Nude War Games, the two challenged Annie Social and Sumie Sakai for the WEW Tag Team Championship but failed to win gold.

==== Shimmer Women Athletes (2006–2008) ====
After continuing to wrestle as singles wrestlers, the two found themselves individually employed by Illinois-based start-up promotion Shimmer Women Athletes from its beginning in 2005. It was not until Volume 5 that the Minnesota Home Wrecking Crew made their presence known, with Lacey confronting Mercedes Martinez for focusing too much on Sara Del Rey and goading her into a tag team match. Martinez actually picked Del Rey as her partner but Lacey's boasting was justified as the Home Wreckers picked up their maiden Shimmer win after Del Rey accidentally hit Martinez with a running boot while aiming for Lacey. During Volume 7 Rain, with Lacey in her corner, found herself wrestling MsChif who was embroiled in a feud with Cheerleader Melissa. When Melissa came to the ringside to attack MsChif she was shoved to the floor by Lacey eventually leading to Rain's loss by disqualification. In return, the two attacked Melissa in her main event match but, in a moment that saw enemies become allies, MsChif ran out to save Melissa and beat down the two, leading to Lacey challenging the two to a tag team match. Once again, on Volume 8, the Home Wreckers proved that teamwork prevails over ad hoc teaming when the two performed a Double Team Tomikaze on MsChif before pinning her to win their second match.

Over the course of Volume 11 and Volume 12, Shimmer held a knock out tournament to crown the inaugural Shimmer Champion. Rain was knocked out in the first round by Nikki Roxx but Lacey found greater success, finding herself in the final against Del Rey. As the match was ending, Lacey knocked the referee over allowing Rain to enter the ring and use her Rain Drop finisher on Del Rey. A returning Roxx and Shimmer founder Allison Danger came to the ringside to carry off Rain, making sure the match stayed even leading to Del Rey picking up the title. This led to the main event of Volume 13 where the Home Wreckers faced their tournament foes Del Rey and Roxx who competently defeated the tag team; Del Rey had both in her Royal Butterfly simultaneously from where Nikki Roxx used her Barbie Crusher on Lacey while Rain received a powerslam from Del Rey and was pinned, marking their first Shimmer tag team loss.

After the team became international (see below) The Minnesota Home Wrecking Crew made two more appearances in their original form. Their final appearance in Shimmer was at Volume 18 in April 2008. In what was deemed an upset victory, the team lost to losing to Ashley Lane and Nevaeh, giving the team their first victory in the promotion since joining the company the volume before. This was also Lacey's last match as an active competitor, as she retired from in-ring action and disappeared entirely from wrestling until ROH's Rising Above in November before returning as manager of the International Home Wrecking Crew the following year.

==== Ring of Honor (2007–2008) ====
The tag team made their first appearance in Ring of Honor at The Battle of St Paul in April 2007 as event openers, with Jimmy Jacobs in their corner defeating the Dangerous Angels (Allison Danger and Sara Del Rey). Two months later they appeared at Driven further up the card. They presaged their first International Home Wreckers outing by competing with MsChif and Daizee Haze. Unlike their later Shimmer encounter, the duo managed to score a victory. As Lacey was already a member of Jacobs' The Age of the Fall stable, an invitation was extended to Rain who joined the group and the duo made several appearances, together and apart, for the faction such as at Supercard of Honor III where they held down Jay Briscoe forcing his brother, Mark, to submit.

==== Full Impact Pro Wrestling (2007–2008) ====
After their appearance in ROH, the Home Wreckers were challenged by the Dangerous Angels to a rematch at Hot Summer Nights in June 2007. Joined by Amazing Kong and also facing their other enemy Daizee Haze, the three were victorious. Their winning streak outside of Shimmer came to an abrupt end at Cage of Pain II in September when the combined team of Haze and Del Rey defeated them. Danger remained winless over the team, however, as they successfully wrestled their final FIP match against her and Trenesha. By this point, February 2008, the Minnesota Home Wreckers had become part of the larger FIP group Young, Rich and Ready for action (The YRR) and it was their influence the match before, helping Chasyn Rance defeat Seth Delay, that made Danger call demand a match against the pair. After this match Jacobs invited Rain to join Lacey in The Age Of The Fall, which she accepted.

=== International Home Wrecking Crew (2007–current) ===
In October at Shimmer's Volume 16, the Minnesota Home Wrecking Crew were booked in a tag team match against MsChif, Daizee Haze and 'The Jezebel' Eden Black. In an interview during the evening, the Home Wreckers revealed that they had selected their partner in the form of English native Jetta who had a career long feud with Black, and had faced MsChif and Haze in England. They referred to her as the "cream of their Oreo" but initially the mix failed to work as Jetta was pinned after 25 minutes, losing the match. The team later announced themselves as the International Home Wrecking Crew and returned at Volume 17 when Rain and Jetta defeated Danyah and Jennifer Blake. Later in that evening the original Minnesota Home Wrecking Crew appeared under their original name but were defeated by Ashley Lane and Neveah. After Lacey retired, the International Home Wreckers became a twosome and they gained a return victory over Ashley Lane and Neveah through unsporting means, as Rain grabbed hold of Neveah's tights.

At Volume 21, Shimmer Women Athletes extended their gold to include tag team champions and crowned the inaugural victors in a six team gauntlet match. The Home Wreckers entered fourth and eliminated the Suicide Blondes (LuFisto) and Jennifer Blake) but once again found themselves suffering defeat at the hands of Ashley Lane and Neveah, who eventually won. Owing to the long history between the two teams in both their forms, Volume 23 was promoted with a two out of three falls tag team match between the two for the gold. The match was mired in controversy as, in their typically comic fashion the team wore masks to the ring to protect themselves from swine flu before being joined by a returning Lacey who had not been seen since the previous year and was thought retired. She reversed a pinfall while the referee was distracted allowing her team to pick up the first fall and then, when the referee attempted to eject her from ringside she displayed her official manager's license. Lacey caused the second fall to go against the team as Jetta checked on her after she was knocked off the apron, leaving Rain to be double teamed and pinned. Lacey was fundamental in the third pin as she handed Jetta a chain to use, giving her the second and decisive fall for her team. However, as the team celebrated with their newly found gold, a backstage official came to the ring and demanded the match be restarted owing to the underhanded tactics of the team and Ashley Lane and Neveah instantly pulled out their double team move and won. The team bounced back with a win over Ariel and Nikki Roxx on Volume 24. The team defeated Rachel Summerlyn and Daffney on Volume 27 after the evil Daffney abandoned Rachel during the match, and their last victory in SHIMMER came against the duo of Jessie McKay and Tenille on Volume 28.
