= Rain (wrestler) =

American professional wrestler (born 1981)

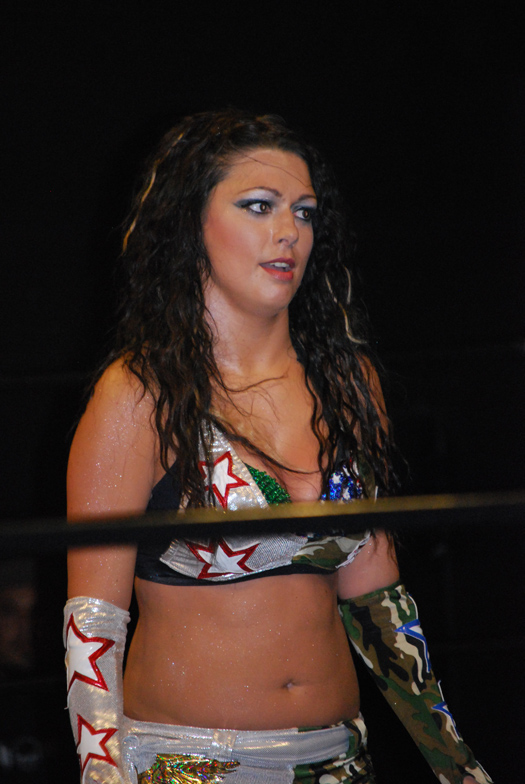
- Rain at a Women Superstars Uncensored show in July 2010

Personal information
- Born: Bonnie Maxson; September 10, 1981 (age 45) Saint Paul, Minnesota, U.S.
- Spouse: Aleki Lee (m. 2018)
- Children: 1

Professional wrestling career
- Ring name(s): Bonnie Maxson; Felony; Hope (Ms.) Payton Banks (Ms.) Peyton Banks; Rain; Sensual Rain
- Billed height: 5 ft 5 in (1.65 m)
- Billed weight: 125 lb (57 kg; 8.9 st)
- Billed from: Saint Paul, Minnesota
- Trained by: Eddie Sharkey; Horace the Psychopath; Lexie Fyfe; Gran Apache
- Debut: 2000
- Retired: 2019

Bonnie Maxson (born September 10, 1981), better known by her ring name Rain, is an American retired professional wrestler. She is best known for her time in Total Nonstop Action Wrestling (TNA), Shine Wrestling and the Mexican Asistencia Asesoría y Administración (AAA) promotions. She formerly teamed with Lacey to form The Minnesota Home Wrecking Crew (a play on the name of The Minnesota Wrecking Crew), but following Lacey's retirement, she teamed with British wrestler Jetta to form The International Home Wrecking Crew. Rain was also the inaugural Shine Champion.

== Professional wrestling career ==
=== Early career (2000–2005) ===
Maxson started working for a local promotion, Steel Domain Wrestling (SDW) in Saint Paul, Minnesota. Later, after gaining the experience of a wrestler, she began working for various promotions in the Midwest, such as IWA Mid-South, Combat Zone Wrestling (CZW), NWA Midwest, Ring of Honor (ROH), Shimmer Women Athletes, and Women's Extreme Wrestling under the ring name Rain.

=== Shimmer Women Athletes (2005–2009; 2018) ===
On November 6, 2005, Rain made her debut for Shimmer Women Athletes on the promotion's debut show, losing to Ariel. She picked up her first victory in the promotion on Volume 3, which was taped on February 12, 2006, defeating Nikki Roxx. On May 21 on Volume 6, the team of Rain and Lacey, known collectively as The Minnesota Home Wrecking Crew, made their debut as a tag team, defeating Sara Del Rey and Mercedes Martinez. After another tag team victory on Volume 8 against Cheerleader Melissa and MsChif, Rain entered the Shimmer Championship tournament on Volume 11 on June 1, 2007, but was eliminated in the first round by Roxx. The following day on Volume 13, the Minnesota Home Wrecking Crew suffered its first loss in a match against Del Rey and Roxx. On October 13, Rain and Lacey were joined by Jetta, and together they formed the stable The International Home Wrecking Crew. In their debut match as a trio, they were defeated by Daizee Haze, MsChif and Eden Black. On April 26, 2008, on Volume 18, Rain and Lacey were defeated by the team of Ashley Lane and Nevaeh.

After Lacey's retirement, Rain and Jetta continued teaming together, and on Volume 21, taped on October 19, 2008, they entered a gauntlet match to determine the first ever Shimmer Tag Team Champions. The team entered the match fourth and eliminated Jennifer Blake and LuFisto, before being eliminated by the eventual winners, Ashley Lane and Nevaeh. On Volume 23, Rain and Jetta faced Lane and Nevaeh in a two out of three falls match for the tag team titles. During the match, Lacey's debuted as Rain and Jetta's new manager and helped them score the first fall. Lane and Nevaeh came to back to even the score, after Lacey's second interference backfired, but Jetta scored the deciding fall after using a chain given to her by Lacey. However, after referee Bryce Remsburg found out that Jetta had cheated to win, he restarted the match and Lane and Nevaeh ultimately retained the titles.

On April 15, 2018, Rain return to Shimmer on Volume 104 accompanied by Lacey, where she unsuccessfully challenged Saraya Knight.

=== Total Nonstop Action Wrestling (2007–2008) ===
Maxson appeared as a planted fan on the October 18, 2007 episode of Total Nonstop Action Wrestling (TNA)'s Impact!, holding up a sign reading "President of Robert Roode Fan Club". She continued to appear in the crowd with pro-Roode signs for the following two weeks. On the November 1 episode of Impact!, Maxson's presence was acknowledged by TNA announcers, and she also had a stare-down with Roode's former valet, Ms. Brooks. In the aftermath of a match on an episode of Impact!, after Ms. Brooks and Roode defeated Chris Harris and Gail Kim, Brooks was about to leave the ring when she attacked and started a fight with Maxson. Following the altercation, she was seen from far distances around the TNA Impact Zone in backstage segments. She was referred as Ms. Brooks's stalker by TNA commentators Don West and Mike Tenay.

Maxson made a further appearance on the January 10, 2008 episode of Impact! and attacked Brooks. Subsequently, Roode announced that she had been replaced by Maxson, under the new name (Ms.) Peyton Banks (later tweaked to Payton Banks), resulting in a feud with Brooks and a match at Against All Odds, which Brooks won. At Destination X, Banks was part of the "Stand By Your Man" Strap match, where she was in the corner of Roode, and Brooks was in the corner of Booker T. The match stipulation dictated that the loser of the match would have their valet whipped with a strap. Booker T lost the match, and Banks whipped Brooks with the leather strap until Brooks was saved by Booker's wife, Sharmell. At Lockdown, Booker T and Sharmell defeated Roode and Banks in a mixed tag team match. After the match, Roode verbally abused Banks in the ring and prepared to hit her, but instead left her alone in the ring. Following the angle with Roode, Maxson left TNA.

=== Asistencia, Asesoría y Administración (2009–2010) ===
On August 21, 2009, at Verano de Escándalo, Rain made her debut for Lucha Libre AAA World Wide (AAA) as a member of La Legión Extranjera, led by Konnan. In the promotion she regularly teamed with Jennifer Blake and Sexy Star as well as acting as the valet of Alex Koslov. At the 2010 Rey de Reyes show, Rain, Christina Von Eerie and Sexy Star faced off against Cynthia Moreno, Mari and Faby Apache, a match which Moreno won for her team by pinning Sexy Star. During a post Rey de Reyes interview, Sexy Star claimed that the Apaches and Moreno were nothing but maids, which led to AAA booking a match between Moreno, Faby and Mari Apache against Sexy Star, Rain and Blake in a Triplemanía XVIII match, where the person pinned or submitted would have to be the winning team's slave for a month. At Triplemanía, La Legión defeated Moreno and the Apaches, when Blake pinned Mari, thanks in part to the biased refereeing by Hijo del Tirantes. Following the match, Konnan ordered Mari Apache to begin her maid duty right away by cleaning up their dressing room. The stipulation expired on July 6, 2010. Rain's contract with AAA expired on July 25, 2010.

=== Wrestlicious (2009–2010) ===
In early 2009, Maxson took part in the tapings of Wrestlicious, under the ring name Felony, which began airing in March 2010. She debuted on March 1 in the first episode teaming with Maria Toro and Bandita defeating the team of Cousin Cassie, Tyler Texas and Charlotte. On the April 7 episode of Takedown, Felony was one of the last two girls along with Glory standing in a 20-girl over-the-top-rope "Hoedown Throwdown" battle royal to determine the top two contenders for the Wrestlicious Championship. On the May 24 episode of Wrestlicious Takedown, Felony lost the Wrestlicious Championship match to Glory.

=== Women Superstars Uncensored (2009–2012) ===
Rain debuted in WSU in January 2009 with two victories over Rachel Summerlyn on separate DVD tapings in one night. She would go on to defeat Malia Hosaka at WSU's 2 year anniversary show. She went to the finals of WSU's 2009 J-Cup but lost to Angel Orsini in the finals. The following night she received her first WSU Championship shot in a three-way match involving Orsini and champion Mercedes Martinez in which Mercedes retained her title. Rain picked up a win over Nikki Roxx in June and in August, she teamed up with Orsini to challenge for the WSU tag team titles which they lost via DQ. Later that night on WSU's second DVD taping, the duo were successful against Roxx and Martinez. Rain and Orsini's partnership would not last long and they would become enemies again. On October 3, 2009, Rain defeated Orsini in an uncensored rules match.

Rain would go on to defeat Portia Perez to become the #1 contender to the WSU Championship. Rain would face Martinez for the title in the main event of WSU's 3 year anniversary show in March 2010. Martinez successfully defended her title against Rain, defeating her in an uncensored rules match on March 6, 2010. Rain would main event WSU's next show which was the first of two tapings in a loss to Awesome Kong. Rain would form her own alliance known as Rain's Army with Roxx and Jessicka Havok later in 2010. At WSU's first ever internet pay per view, Breaking Barries, Rain picked up an impressive victory over Jamilia Craft in just 3 minutes. The win garnered Rain another title shot on November 6, 2010. However, Martinez was once again successful, defeating Rain this time in an I Quit match.

Rain's Army would come to an end when Havok turned on Rain and challenged her to a match which Havok won at WSU's 4 year anniversary show on March 5, 2011. From there, Rain would challenge for the WSU Spirit Championship at the Uncensored Rumble iPPV but came up short, losing to champion Sassy Stephanie. Rain would enter the Uncensored Rumble match but was eliminated by Amy Lee. Rain would turn to more of a fan-favorite after as she wrestled Serena Deeb at WSU's next event. Serena won the match but afterwards, they were both assaulted by tag team champions, the Boston Shore (Amber and Lexxus). Rain and Serena agreed to form a tag team to challenge for the titles but Serena ended up sidelined with a concussion leading Rain to call upon her longtime former tag team partner, Jetta, to reform the International Home Wrecking Crew.

In September, Rain won the WSU Spirit Championship, her first title win in WSU, by defeating Sassy Stephanie. However, she would lose the championship later that very same night when she accepted an impromptu challenge from Havok, who defeated her for the belt. On November 19, 2011, Rain and Jetta reformed the International Home Wrecking Crew but lost to the Boston Shore in a tag titles match. Rain would later save Melina from a Boston Shore attack. At WSU's 5 year anniversary show on March 3, 2012, Rain was pinned by Lexxus, but bounced back with a win over Athena on April 24. After which, Rain announced plans to put her career on the line in the Uncensored Rumble match on June 16, however she was forced to cancel due to an illness. WSU was then sold to new owners and Rain subsequently announced on July 14 that she could not come to a deal with the new owners and thus would not be returning to the promotion.

=== Shine Wrestling (2012–2014; 2017–2018) ===
Rain made her debut for new women's wrestling promotion Shine Wrestling (stylized as SHINE), on July 20 in Ybor City, Florida where she defeated Nikki Roxx. At the next event on August 17, Rain continued her winning streak by defeating Santana Garrett. Rain competed in the main event of Shine 3 against Jazz on September 21 where she suffered her first defeat. At Shine 4 on October 19, Rain defeated Christina Von Eerie and later that night she would cost Jazz her match in the main event. That led to Shine 5 on November 16 where Rain teamed up with Mercedes Martinez in a losing effort against Jazz and Amazing Kong. During that match, Rain suffered a broken wrist.

At Shine 6 on January 11, 2013, Rain did not compete due to injury but interfered in the main event, costing Kong her match against Mercedes Martinez. After the match, Rain formed her new group called The Valkyrie consisting of herself, Ivelisse, Allysin Kay, Taylor Made, and April Hunter. On February 5, Rain officially announced that she would retire from wrestling at the end of the year. On February 22, Rain headlined Shine 7 with a DQ victory over Kong. At Shine 8 in March, Rain led the Valkyrie to victory in an eight-woman tag team match. Shine announced a tournament to crown its first champion and Rain defeated Angelina Love to advance to the tournament. On July 12, Rain first defeated LuFisto in the first round, then Jessicka Havok in the semifinals and finally Mia Yim in the finals to win the tournament and become the inaugural Shine Champion. On December 13, Rain successfully defended her title against Kong in what was billed as her retirement match. However, after the match, she announced that she was not retiring after all and would continue to defend the title in 2014. On January 24, Rain lost the Shine Championship to Valkyrie stablemate Ivelisse, who was post-match kicked out of the stable. Following the loss, Rain officially retired from wrestling.

On Shine 47, Rain returned to Shine. She won a Survivor Rumble to earn a match for the Shine Championship against LuFisto on Shine 48, which she lost after Stormie Lee distracted her by attacking Tesha Price, who had accompanied Rain to the match.

=== Return to ROH (2017) ===
On November 1, 2017, ROH announced that Rain would be returning to the ring after three years of retirement at the promotion's shows on November 11 and 12. During the weekend, Rain defeated Brandi Rhodes and lost to Sumie Sakai.

== Other media ==
In 2007, Maxson, along with Lacey, ODB, SoCal Val, Daffney and Talia Madison, joined the website Wrestling Vixxxens. Credited under the name "Rayn", she had been involved in the original version of the website which was headed by Missy Hyatt.

== Personal life ==
On February 14, 2014, Maxson was involved in a serious automobile accident caused by another driver who was texting while driving. She suffered severe injuries to her legs and abdomen. Due to the injuries sustained in the accident, Maxson was forced to take a hiatus from wrestling which lasted over three years.

On December 15, 2018, Maxson married Aleki Lee. The couple have a son together. Maxson is also half owner/promoter of UCE Wrestling in Hawaii.

She previously dated Nick Mondo; their relationship was documented in the 2004 film Unscarred.

== Championships and accomplishments ==
- French Lake Wrestling Association
  - FLWA Women's Championship (1 time)
- Midwest Intensity Wrestling
  - MIW Women's Championship (1 time)
- Pro Wrestling Illustrated
  - Ranked No. 16 of the top 50 female wrestlers in the PWI Female 50 in 2013
- Shine Wrestling
  - Shine Championship (1 time)
  - Shine Championship Tournament (2013)
- Women Superstars Uncensored
  - WSU Spirit Championship (1 time)
- Unify Championship Entertainment
  - Unify Women's Championship (1 time)
