= Vicky Swain =

British professional wrestler

Personal information
- Born: Victoria Swain; 26 December 1985 (age 40) United Kingdom

Professional wrestling career
- Ring name(s): Minx; Skye; Vicky Skye; Vicky Swain
- Billed height: 5 ft 6 in (1.68 m)
- Billed weight: 130 lb (59 kg)
- Trained by: Dropkixx; Purfleet Essex; Blue Bloods Academy; Future Shock Wrestling; Ashe; Dave Taylor; William Regal; Chris Benoit; Bryan Danielson; Alex Shane; Tony Scarlo
- Debut: 2002

Victoria Swain (born 26 December 1985), better known by her ring name Vicky Skye, often shortened to Skye, is a retired British professional wrestler. Four years into her career, she was voted in the top twenty women wrestlers in the United Kingdom. She is also a qualified fitness instructor.

Skye describes her gimmick in wrestling as "No-nonsense, sweet yet very tough girl with a wild streak". Skye works a mixed style of wrestling, as she has been taught in the British old-school style. She, however, also occasionally uses new school and high flying styles. Skye's ring gear is often blue, but she previously wrestled in a school girl costume.

== Professional wrestling career ==
Swain would be first trained in the Dropkixx academy before debuting in 2002 under her own name, and for a short time, "Minx". Swain quickly adopted the name "Vicky Skye", however, which was later shortened to "Skye" and is the ring name she has continued to use throughout her independent circuit tours of the United Kingdom and Europe.

A year after first competing in a wrestling ring, Skye was given a chance to perform in a in-ring training session during World Wrestling Entertainment's European tour, Insurrextion 2003. She was later invited to the states to train with Chris Benoit, Dave Taylor, William Regal, and Bryan Danielson in Atlanta, Georgia during the end of 2003 into 2004.

Back in Europe, Skye continued to compete on the independent circuit, teaming with male wrestler Ashe, as well as facing off against top British female talent, Jennidee, Erin Angel, Ashley Page, and most notably Nikita. Skye feuded with Nikita all over Europe in unsuccessful attempts to take Nikita's Queens of Chaos title.
