= Nicole Savoy =

American professional wrestler

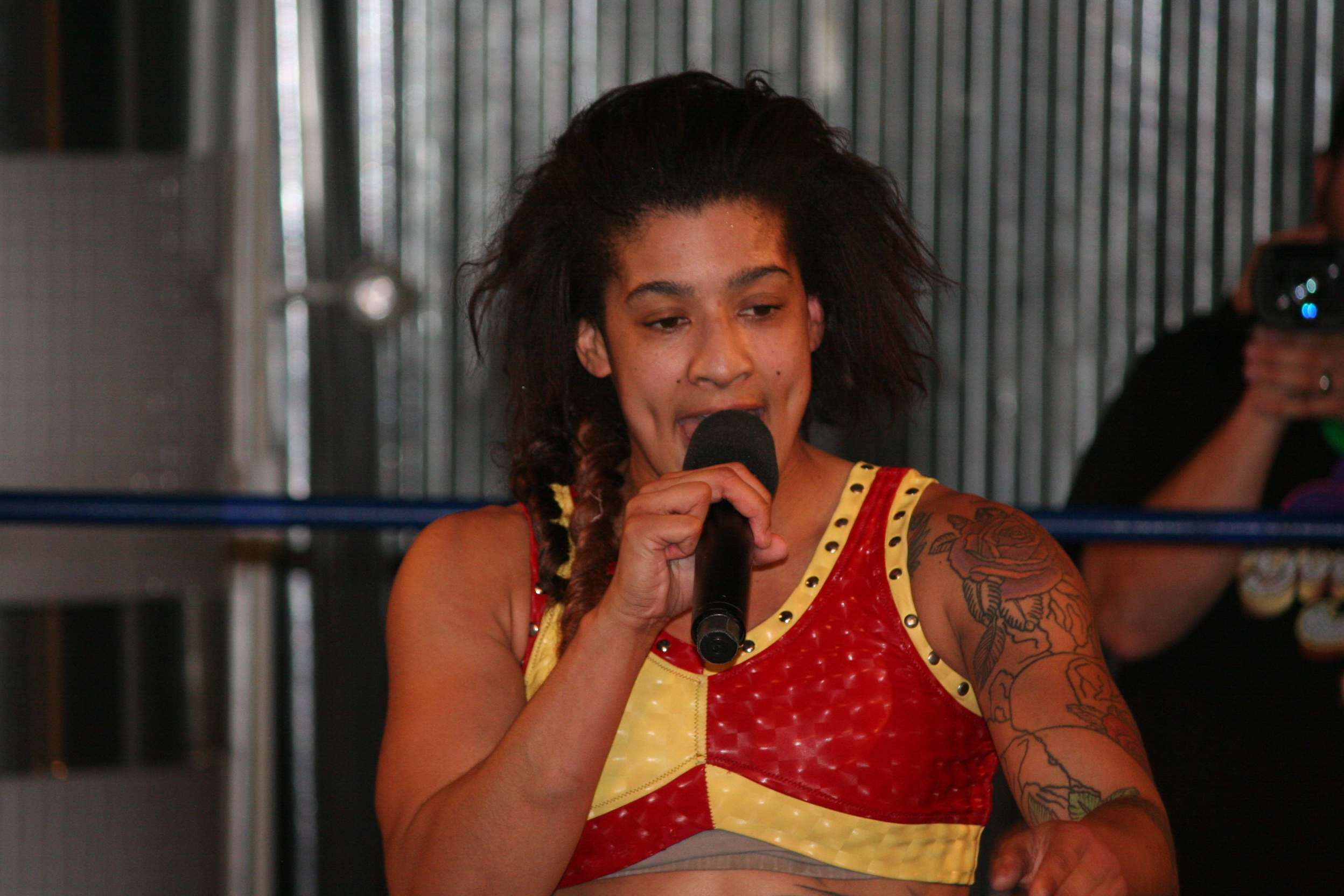
- Savoy in 2016

Professional wrestling career
- Ring name(s): Lil' Swole; Nicole Savoy
- Billed height: 5 ft 7 in (170 cm)
- Billed from: Sacramento, California
- Debut: November 5, 2011

Nicole Savoy is an American professional wrestler. She has performed in Shimmer Women Athletes, where she was the longest reigning Shimmer Champion.

== Early life ==
Savoy is trained in Muay Thai and Jiu-Jitsu.

== Professional wrestling career ==
=== Shimmer Women Athletes (2015–2021) ===
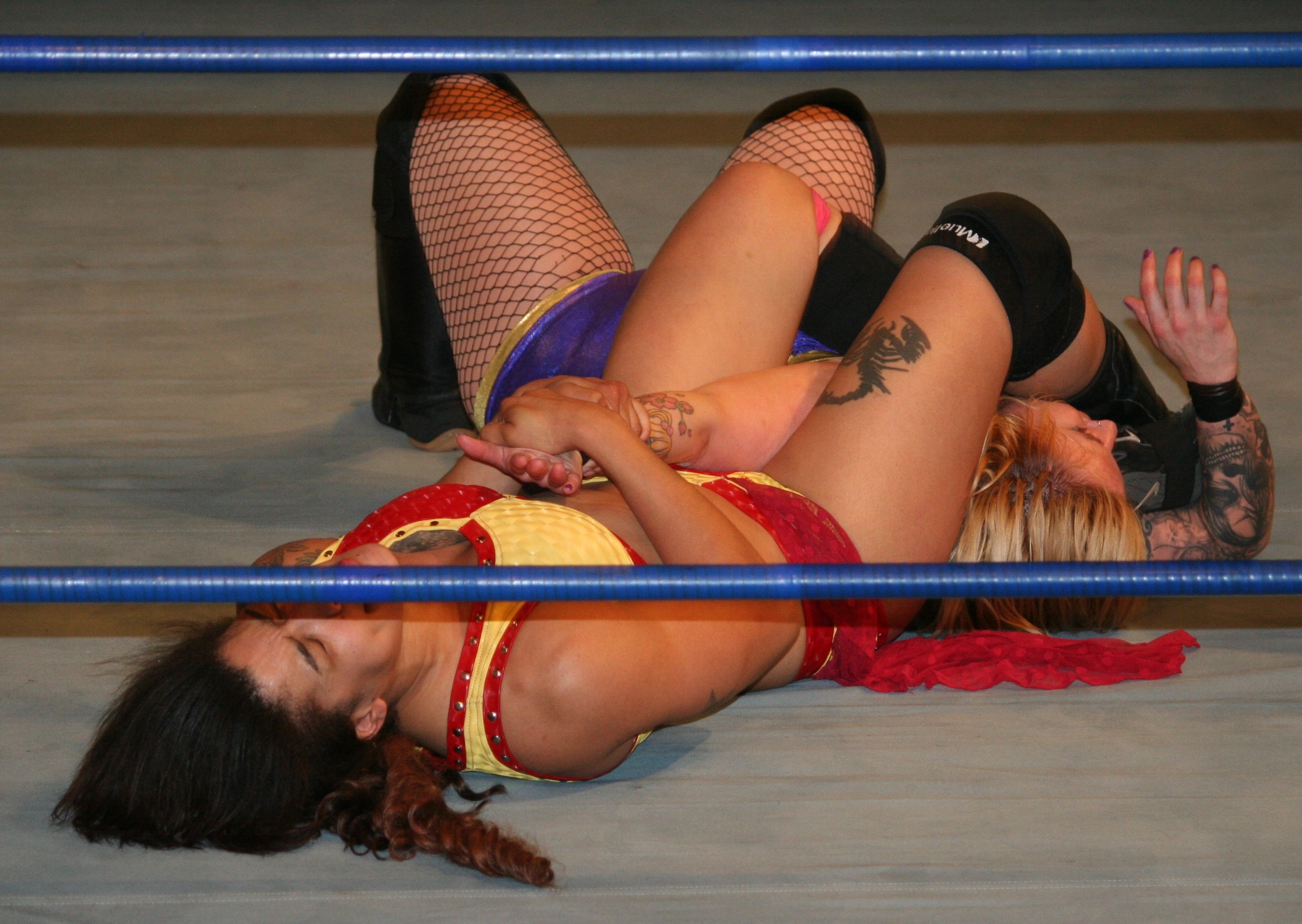
Savoy applies a cross armbreaker on LuFisto, 2016.

On March 23, 2015, Savoy participated in the ChickFight tournament on Volume 71 to determine the No. 1 contender for the Shimmer Championship. She managed to defeat Candice LeRae at the first round, however, was eliminated during the semifinals by losing to Evie. Savoy received a Shimmer Championship match on October 11 at Volume 78, where she unsuccessfully challenged then-champion Madison Eagles. On April 2, 2016, Savoy participated in a twelve-woman tournament on Volume 80 to crown the inaugural Heart of Shimmer Champion. After defeating Kimber Lee and LuFisto, Savot advanced to the finals where she defeated LeRae and Lovelace in a three-way elimination match to win the championship. At the Volume 93 taping on July 8, 2017, Savoy lost the championship to Shazza McKenzie, ending her reign at 462 days with five successful title defenses.

Savoy defeated Mercedes Martinez on Volume 99 on November 12, 2017, to win the Shimmer Championship. On Volume 100 on April 7, 2018, she successfully defended the title against Martinez in a rematch. She went on to retain the title against Britt Baker, Cheerleader Melissa, Deonna Purrazzo, and Nicole Matthews. On Volume 114 on November 2, 2019, she teamed with Big Swole, unsuccessfully challenging Martinez and Melissa for the Shimmer Tag Team Championship. On Volume 116 on November 2, Savoy lost her title to Lee in a four-way elimination match, which also involved Priscilla Kelly and Shotzi Blackheart, ending her reign at 721 days with 17 successful title defenses. By the end of her title reign, Savoy had become the longest reigning Shimmer Champion.

=== World Wonder Ring Stardom (2015) ===
Savoy made her World Wonder Ring Stardom debut on October 16, 2015, during Stardom's USA Tour, in a loss to Mayu Iwatani. On October 18, Savoy, Brittany Wonder and Datura lost to Oedo Tai (Act Yasukawa, Kyoko Kimura and Thunder Rosa).

=== National promotions (2017–present) ===
Savoy competed for WWE in their 2017 Mae Young Classic tournament. She defeated Reina González in the first round but lost to Candice LeRae during the next round. On August 31, 2019, Savoy participated in the Casino Battle Royal taking place at All Elite Wrestling (AEW)'s All Out, where she was eliminated by Nyla Rose. On December 15, Savoy made her Ring of Honor (ROH) debut at the taping of the second night of Final Battle by defeating Sumie Sakai.

In February 2020, Savoy was announced as a participant in a 16-woman tournament to crown the inaugural ROH Women's World Champion on April 27 at Quest for Gold. The event, however, was cancelled, and the tournament was postponed due to the COVID-19 pandemic. In August, Savoy participated in AEW's Women's Tag Team Cup Tournament: The Deadly Draw under the name Lil' Swole, teaming with Big Swole. The two defeated Leva Bates and Raché Chanel in the quarter-finals but lost to Allie and Brandi Rhodes during the semifinals.

Savoy returned in 2021 to ROH to participate in a tournament to crown the inaugural ROH Women's World Champion. On July 30, Savoy defeated Mazzerati in the first round of the tournament. Savoy lost the following round to Miranda Alize, thus was eliminated from the tournament.

=== World Wonder Ring Stardom (2018) ===
In August and September 2018, Savoy competed in the Blue Stars block of the 2018 5 Star Grand Prix, in which she scored a total of eight points.

=== Major League Wrestling (2021–2022) ===
On the September 22, 2021, episode of Fusion Alpha, Major League Wrestling (MLW) announced Savoy as part of their new women's featherweight division.

== Championships and accomplishments ==
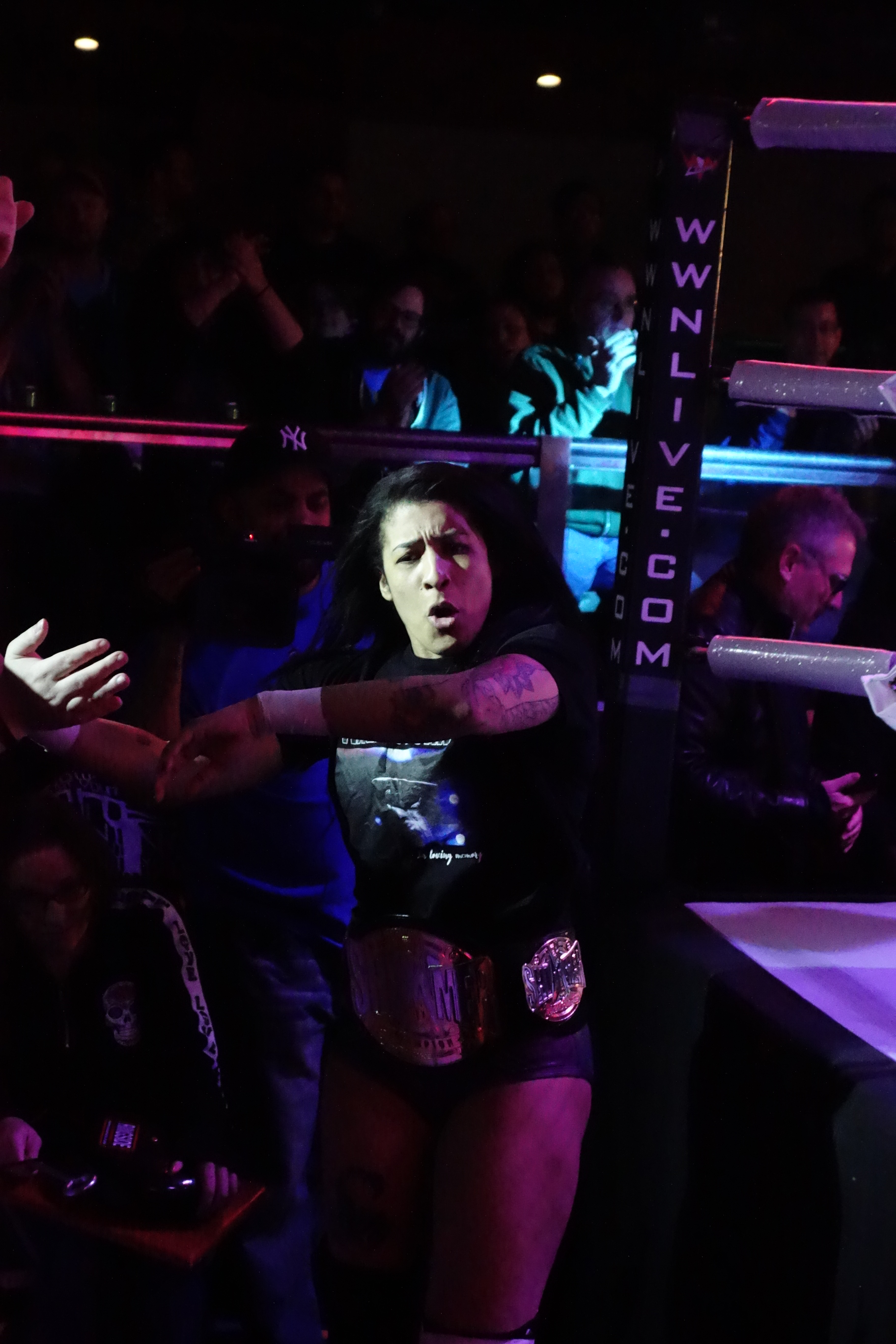
Savoy as Shimmer Champion, 2019

- Alternative Wrestling Show
  - AWS Women's Championship (1 time)
  - Race for the Ring Women's Tournament (2015)
- Gold Rush Pro Wrestling
  - Golden Thrones Tournament (2016) – with J. R. Kratos
- Pro Wrestling Illustrated
  - Ranked No. 10 of the top 100 female wrestlers in the PWI Female 100 in 2019
- Pro Wrestling Revolution
  - PWR World Women's Championship (1 time, current)
- Shimmer Women Athletes
  - Heart of Shimmer Championship (1 time, inaugural)
  - Heart of Shimmer Championship Tournament (2016)
  - Shimmer Championship (1 time)
