= Heart of Shimmer Championship =

Professional wrestling championship

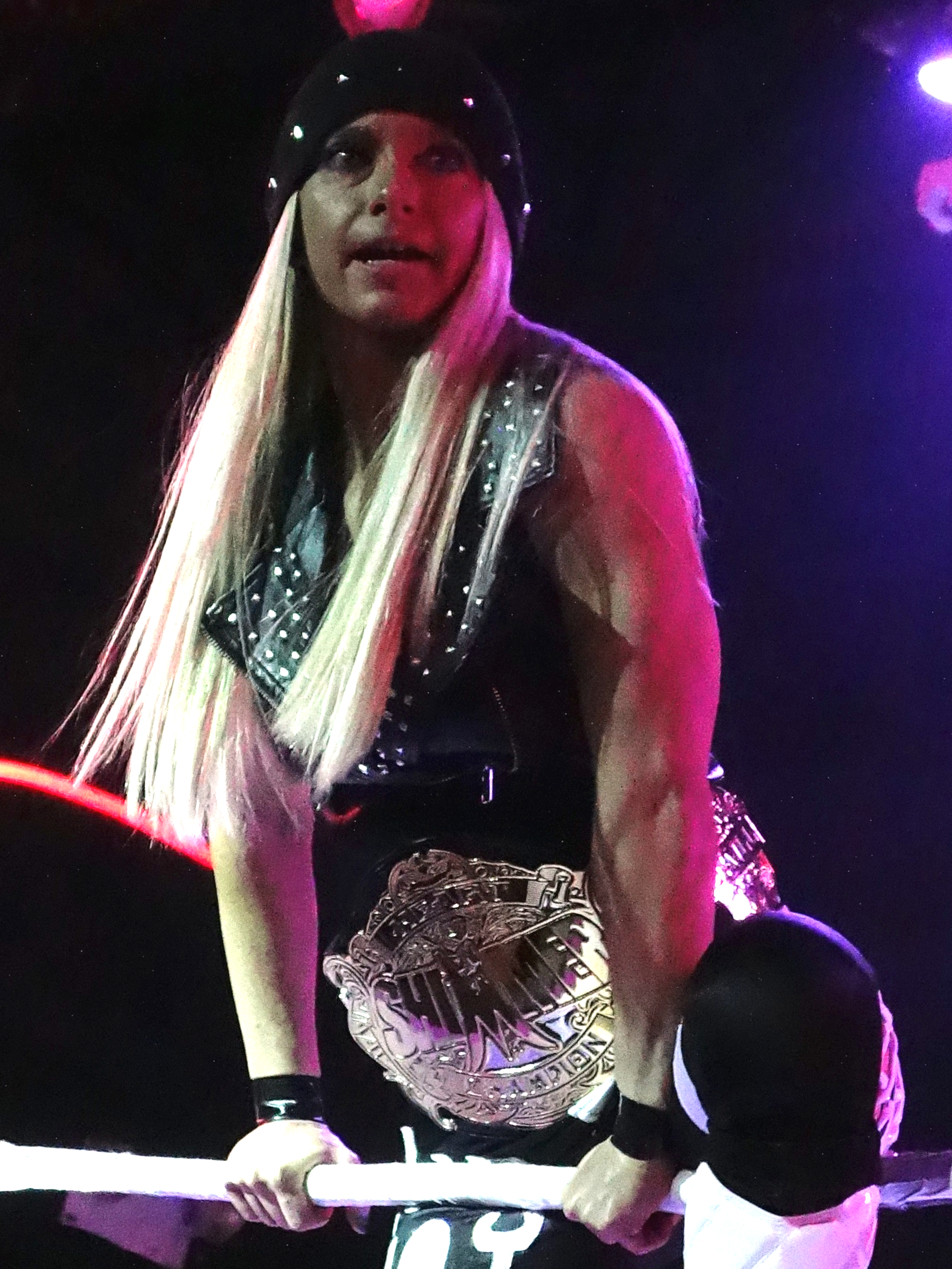
- Dust with the Heart of SHIMMER championship around her waist in 2019.

Details
- Promotion: Shimmer Women Athletes
- Date established: April 2, 2016
- Date retired: November 1, 2021
Statistics
- First champion: Nicole Savoy
- Final champion: Nevaeh
- Most reigns: All titleholders (1 reign)
- Longest reign: Samantha Heights (555 days)
- Shortest reign: Nevaeh (1 day)

The Heart of Shimmer Championship (stylized as Heart of SHIMMER Championship) was a women's professional wrestling championship in Shimmer Women Athletes. Championship reigns are determined by professional wrestling matches, in which competitors are involved in scripted rivalries. These narratives create feuds between the various competitors, which cast them as villains and heroines.

== History ==
The Heart of Shimmer Championship was a secondary women's professional wrestling championship that is used in Shimmer Women Athletes for shimmer women's athletes and talent. The inaugural championship tournament and the inaugural championship match for the title took place at the Shimmer Volume 80 event in Dallas, Texas on April 2, 2016, on the same night where Nicole Savoy won to become the Inaugural championship holder of the title.

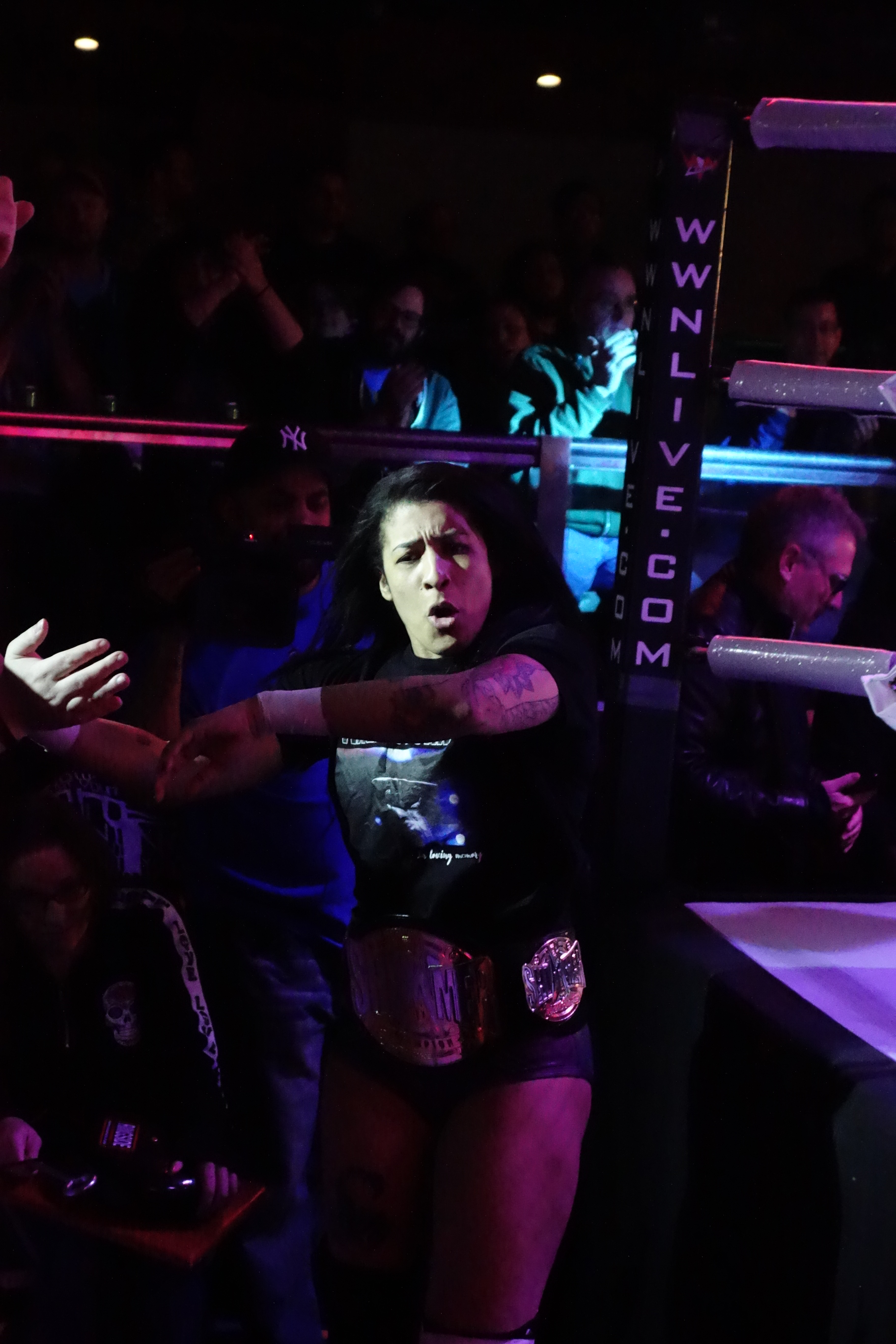
Inaugural Heart of Shimmer champion Nicole Savoy with the Shimmer Championship around her waist.

== Inaugural championship tournament (2016) ==
=== First round tournament matches ===
- Cheerleader Melissa defeated Leva Bates
- Candice LeRae defeated Cherry Bomb
- Nicole Savoy defeated LuFisto by submission
- Kimber Lee defeated Jessicka Havok
- Heidi Lovelace defeated Veda Scott
- Nicole Matthews defeated Crazy Mary Dobson

=== Semi-final tournament matches ===
- Candice LeRae defeated Cheerleader Melissa
- Nicole Savoy defeated Kimber Lee by submission
- Heidi Lovelace defeated Nicole Matthews

=== Tournament final three-way elimination match ===
- Nicole Savoy defeated Candice LeRae and Heidi Lovelace by submission

== Reigns ==
Key
No.	Overall reign number
Reign	Reign number for the specific champion
Days	Number of days held
Defenses	Number of successful defenses
+	Current reign is changing daily

No.	Champion	Championship change			Reign statistics			Notes	Ref.
No.	Champion	Date	Event	Location	Reign	Days	Defenses	Notes	Ref.
Shimmer Women Athletes
1	Nicole Savoy	April 2, 2016	Volume 80	Dallas, TX	1	462	5	Savoy defeated Candice LeRae and Heidi Lovelace in a three-way elimination match in the finals of a twelve-woman tournament to become the inaugural champion.	
2	Shazza McKenzie	July 8, 2017	Volume 93	Berwyn, IL	1	281	10		
3	Dust	April 15, 2018	Volume 104	Berwyn, IL	1	355	7		
4	Samantha Heights	April 5, 2019	Volume 113	Woodside, Queens, NY	1	555	1		
—	Hyan	November 3, 2019	Volume 116	Berwyn, IL	1	343	2	With Samantha Heights being injured, Shimmer hosted a tournament to crown an interim champion. Hyan won the tournament finals in a three-way elimination match, which also involved Kris Statlander and Rhia O'Reilly, to become the interim champion.	
5	Hyan	October 11, 2020	The Collective	Indianapolis, IN	1	385	1	Defeated Thunderkitty to become lineal champion.	
6	Nevaeh	October 31, 2021	Volume 119	Berwyn, IL	1	1	1		
—	Deactivated	November 1, 2021	—	—	—	—	—	On November 1, 2021, this title became deactivated.	
