= Jessie McKay =

Australian professional wrestler

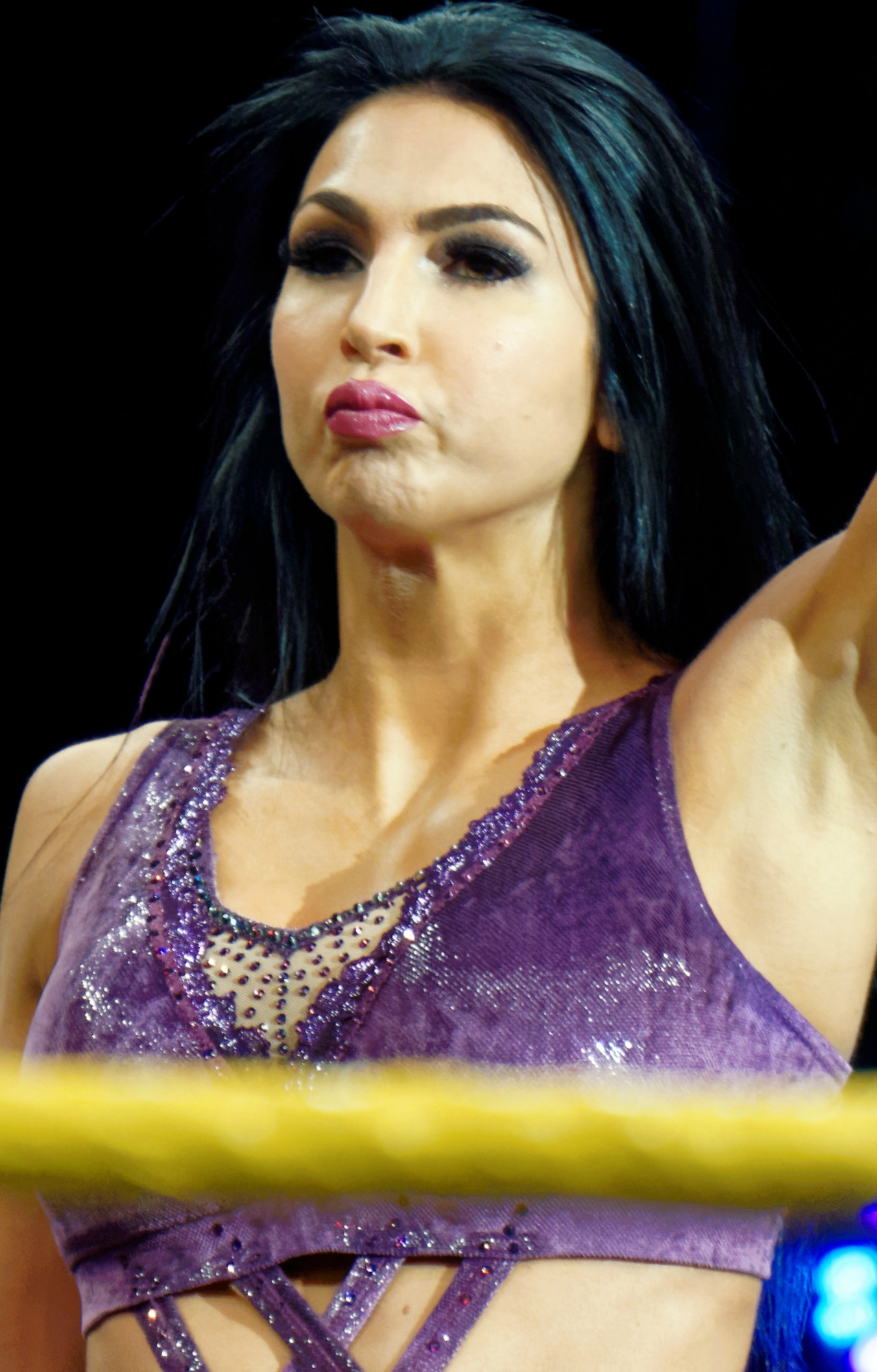
- Kay in 2016

Personal information
- Born: Jessica McKay; 23 June 1989 (age 37) Sydney, New South Wales, Australia
- Children: 1

Professional wrestling career
- Ring name(s): Billie Kay; Jessie; Jessie McKay
- Billed height: 5 ft 8 in (173 cm)
- Billed weight: 132 lb (60 kg)
- Billed from: Sydney, Australia
- Trained by: Madison Eagles
- Debut: 23 June 2007

Jessica McKay (born 23 June 1989) is an Australian professional wrestler. She is signed to All Elite Wrestling (AEW), where she performs under her real name (stylized as Jessie McKay) and is a member of The IInspiration alongside Cassie Lee. She is best known for her time in WWE, where she performed under the ring name Billie Kay.

In June 2007, McKay made her professional wrestling debut at Pro Wrestling Alliance (PWA), and she debuted one-year later for the Pro Wrestling Women's Alliance promotion, where she became a two-time PWWA Champion. She later started competing on the independent circuit for multiple promotions in the United States for several years, most notably and commonly for Shimmer Women Athletes.

== Early life ==
McKay began watching wrestling at the age of 10 along with her brother, and started her professional wrestling career first attending to the Australian promotion based in Sydney, Pro Wrestling Australia. Prior to becoming a wrestler, McKay excelled in basketball. She attended the same high school (Westfields Sports) as fellow wrestler Cassandra McIntosh.

== Professional wrestling career ==
=== Pro Wrestling Alliance Australia (2007–2015) ===
McKay was trained by Madison Eagles. She debuted on 23 June 2007, on her eighteenth birthday, at PWA Australia with a win over Eagles and Aurora, wrestling under her birth name as Jessie McKay.

On 2 August 2008, McKay defeated defending champion Kellie Skater to win the PWWA Championship for the first time. She had one successful title defence on 8 November against Tenille Tayla. On 22 November, she lost her title to Penni Lane. After Lane vacated her title due to injury, McKay won the PWWA Championship for the second time in a four-way match against Kellie Skater, Sway, and Shazza McKenzie on 14 September 2009. McKay had two successful title defences against KC Cassidy and Madison Eagles in March and May 2010, but lost the title to Eagles on 11 June 2010.

In September 2011, McKay failed to win a three-way match for the Shimmer Championship also featuring champion Madison Eagles and Nicole Matthews. In August 2012, in a match to crown the interim PWWA Champion, she was defeated by Evie.

=== Shimmer Women Athletes (2008–2015) ===
McKay began wrestling for the American all-female promotion Shimmer Women Athletes in October 2008, making her debut at Volume 21 along with Madison Eagles as the Pink Ladies, participating in a tag team gauntlet match to determine the inaugural Shimmer Tag Team Champions, but were the first team eliminated. McKay made her singles debut in Shimmer with a loss to Kellie Skater at Volume 24.

At Volume 33 in September 2010, McKay defeated Nicole Matthews, after losing to Matthews earlier that year in April at Volume 30. She followed up with an upset victory over Ayako Hamada and Sara Del Rey in a three-way match by pinning former Shimmer Champion Del Rey at Volume 34. As a result, later in September 2010, McKay was granted a title match against her trainer and former tag partner, Shimmer Champion Madison Eagles at Volume 35, but failed to win.

After her failed title challenge, McKay continued her feud with Nicole Matthews. At Volume 36, she teamed up with Tenille, challenging The Canadian NINJAs (Matthews and Portia Perez) for the Shimmer Tag Team Championship, but were defeated. However, she gained a victory over the Canadian NINJAs at Volume 38 while teaming with Serena. McKay concluded her feud with Matthews with a loss in a two-out-of-three falls match at Volume 39 in March 2011.

In March 2012, victories over Mia Yim at Volume 45 and former Shimmer Champion MsChif at Volume 46 led to McKay receiving another shot at the Shimmer Championship, but lost to defending champion Cheerleader Melissa at Volume 47. At Volume 53 in April 2013, McKay was defeated by Madison Eagles in Eagles' return match. At Volume 57, McKay defeated Mercedes Martinez.

=== Other promotions (2008–2015) ===
Other than wrestling for Shimmer, McKay has also wrestled for other American promotions, including Combat Zone Wrestling (CZW) and Ring of Honor (ROH) in 2008, and Chikara in 2011. She also wrestled for the Canadian promotion NCW Femmes Fatales in 2012. McKay debuted for the American promotion Shine Wrestling at Shine 9 in April 2014, with a victory in a six-person tag team match, teaming with Kellie Skater and Shazza McKenzie to defeat Nikki Roxx, Santana and Mia Yim.

=== WWE (2015–2021) ===
==== NXT (2015–2018) ====
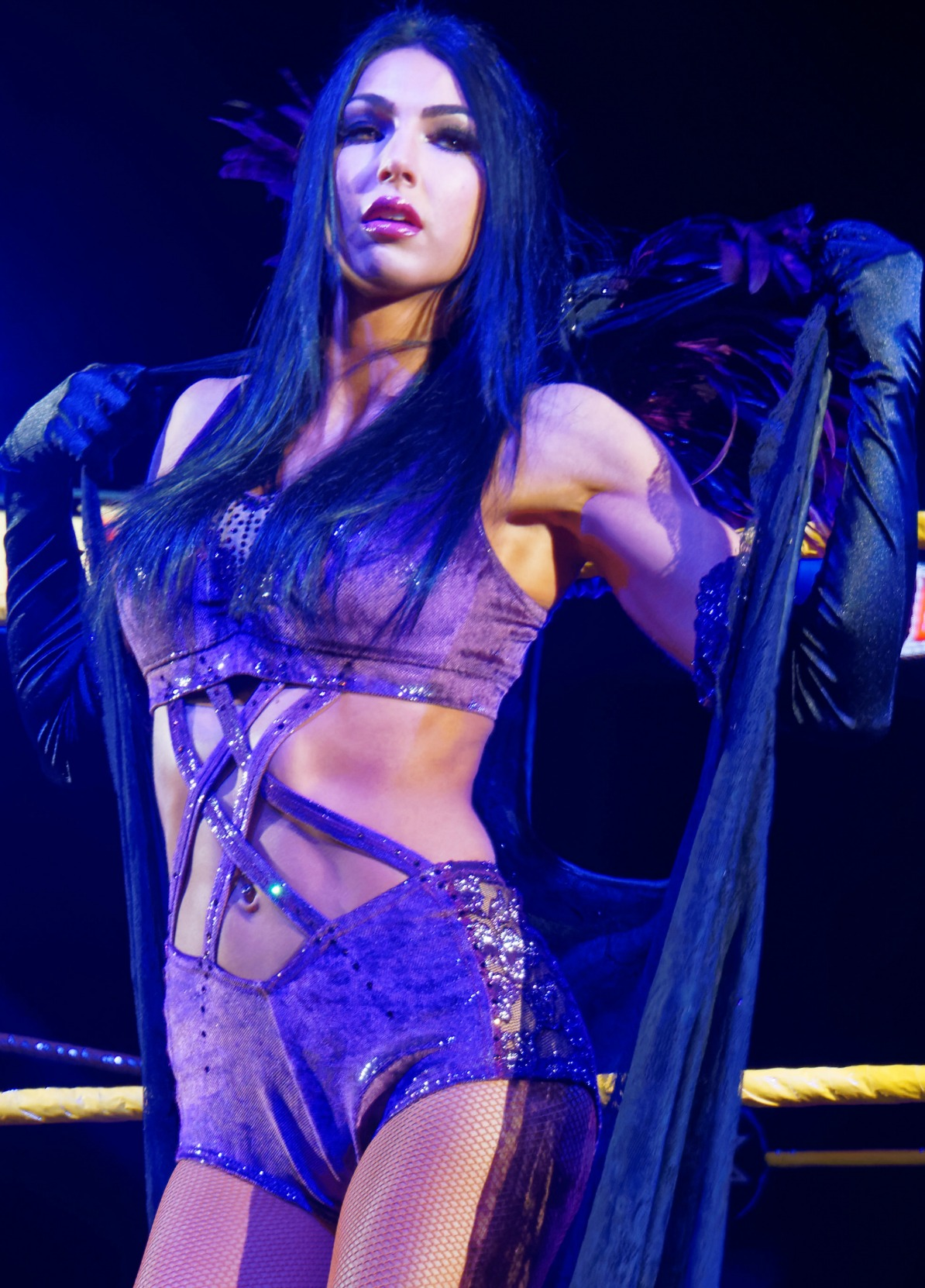
Kay prior to a match at WrestleMania 32 Axxess in April 2016

McKay received a tryout with WWE during their tour of Australia in August 2014 and became an NXT trainee on 13 April 2015. McKay made her televised in-ring debut on the 10 June episode of NXT, where she competed in a losing effort against Becky Lynch under the ring name Jessie. On 7 August, she was given the new ring name Billie Kay. After competing in most of her matches at NXT as a face, Kay competed on her first match as a heel on the 21 October episode of NXT, losing to Asuka. Through the end of 2015, Kay started being managed by fellow wrestler, Sylvester Lefort, during multiple NXT live events, however, it did not last for long after Lefort was released from his contract in February 2016.

On the 13 January 2016 episode of NXT, Kay competed in a number one contender's battle royal for Bayley's NXT Women's Championship, which was won by Carmella. Kay made her first appearance on the main roster on the 30 June episode of SmackDown, where she worked as a jobber losing to Dana Brooke. Kay finally made her return to NXT television on 27 July, where she achieved her first live victory in the company by defeating Santana Garrett. After asking NXT's general manager William Regal for a match at TakeOver: Brooklyn II on the 17 August episode of NXT, she was granted one against the debutant Ember Moon. At the event on 20 August, Kay was defeated by Moon. Following a brief hiatus, Kay returned on the 21 September episode of NXT, where she defeated Aliyah.

In October, Kay started an alliance with Peyton Royce, later dubbed The Iconic Duo, and later entered a feud with Liv Morgan with the duo attacking and defeating Morgan in singles matches. This ultimately led to a six-women tag team match at TakeOver: Toronto, which was taped and aired for the 23 November episode of NXT, in which Aliyah, Ember Moon, and Morgan defeated Kay, Royce, and their partner Daria Berenato. In the end of December, Kay and Royce were placed in a brief feud with the NXT Women's Champion Asuka after the latter stated there is no competition for her. This resulted in a fatal four-way match, which also involved Nikki Cross, at the TakeOver: San Antonio event on 28 January 2017, in which both Kay and Royce failed to capture the NXT Women's Championship.

==== The IIconics (2018–2020) ====
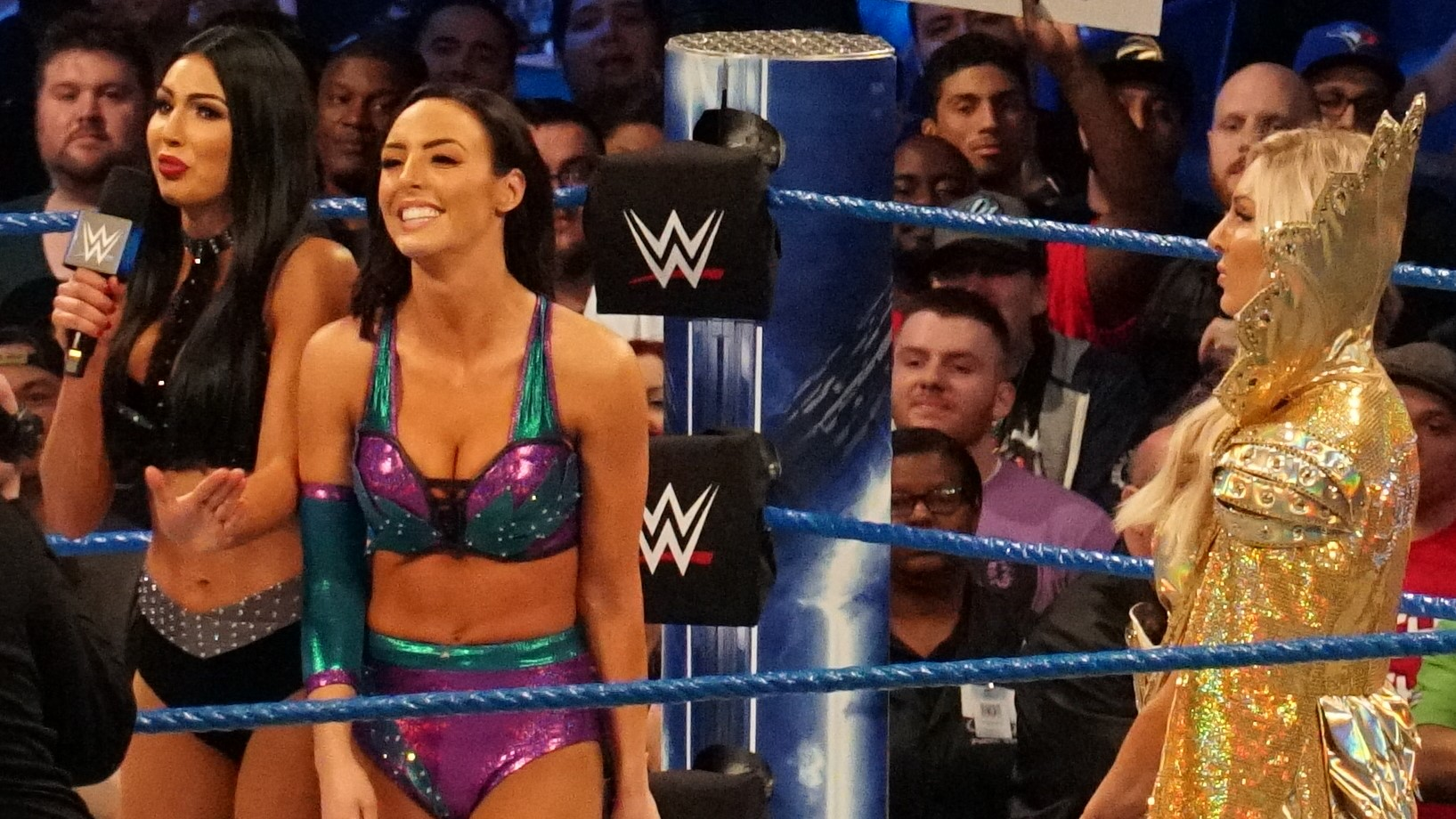
The IIconics debuted on SmackDown by interrupting Charlotte Flair

Kay and Royce, now dubbed The IIconics, made their main roster debut on the 10 April 2018 episode of SmackDown Live attacking then SmackDown Women's Champion Charlotte Flair, whilst she was cutting a promo about her match at WrestleMania 34. Week later, Kay lost to Flair. In their first match together as part of the main roster, The IIconics racked up their first victory against Asuka and Becky Lynch. Throughout the next few months, Kay competed in various singles and tag team matches but ended up on the losing end. In August, The IIconics started their first feud on the main roster, with Naomi, and the two were able to defeat her in singles matches. Eventually, Naomi teamed up with Asuka but lost to the IIconics at the Super Show-Down on 6 October, held in the latter's homeland of Australia. Three weeks later, both Kay and Royce took part in WWE's first all-women's pay-per-view, Evolution; they were the first two eliminated from a battle royal for a future women's championship match.

On 27 January 2019, both Kay and Royce entered their first Royal Rumble match at number 7 and number 9, respectively, and they managed to eliminate Nikki Cross, before they both were eliminated by Lacey Evans. On 17 February, at the Elimination Chamber event, The IIconics competed in a tag team Elimination Chamber match for the inaugural WWE Women's Tag Team Championship, which was won by The Boss 'n' Hug Connection (Bayley and Sasha Banks). In March, The IIconics started a feud with Banks and Bayley, whom they defeated in a non-title match. Because of their win, they (and two other teams) challenged Banks and Bayley for the championship at WrestleMania 35 in a fatal four-way match. At the event, which took place on 7 April, The IIconics won the match after Kay pinned Bayley to win the Women's Tag Team Championship for the first time. On the 5 August episode of Raw, The IIconics lost the titles to Alexa Bliss and Nikki Cross in a fatal four-way match also involving the teams of The Kabuki Warriors (Asuka and Kairi Sane) and Fire and Desire (Mandy Rose and Sonya Deville). On 16 October, it was announced that The IIconics had been drafted to the Raw brand as supplemental picks of the 2019 WWE Draft.

After a brief hiatus, Kay and Royce made their return on the 11 May 2020 episode of Raw, interrupting WWE Women's Tag Team Champions Alexa Bliss and Nikki Cross. They later defeated the champions in a non-title match. They would unsuccessfully challenge for the WWE Women's Tag Team Championships multiple times throughout the summer. They would begin a feud with Ruby Riott mocking her backstage for not having any friends. They would go on to trade victories as Kay and Royce defeated Riott while Riott defeated Kay. At Payback, The IIconics were defeated by Riott and her newly reunited tag partner Liv Morgan. The following night on Raw, The IIconics were forced to disband after losing to The Riott Squad per stipulation.

==== Final storylines (2020–2021) ====
As part of the 2020 Draft in October, Kay went undrafted and was subsequently signed as a free agent to the SmackDown brand. Kay would then begin a storyline on SmackDown where she would offer Superstars such as the Street Profits and Big E to look at her resume only to be rejected by them. On the 1 January 2021 episode of SmackDown, she helped The Riott Squad defeat Natalya and Tamina, much to their dismay. Over the next few weeks, Kay would try to persuade The Riott Squad to add her to their group as she accompanied them to the ring during their matches and attempted to interfere in matches on their behalf, seemingly turning face for the first time since October 2015. However, Kay resumed as a heel when she teamed with Carmella for a tag team turmoil match on Night 1 of WrestleMania 37, which was won by Natalya and Tamina. This would in turn be Kay's final appearance in WWE as she (along with her former partner Peyton Royce) were released from their WWE contracts on 15 April 2021.

=== Impact Wrestling (2021–2022) ===
At Knockouts Knockdown on 9 October 2021, it was announced that The IIconics, now known as The IInspiration, would be making their debut for Impact Wrestling at Bound for Glory. At Bound for Glory, they defeated Decay (Havok and Rosemary) to win the Impact Knockouts World Tag Team Championship. On 20 November, at Turning Point, The IInspiration had their first successful title defense, when they defeated Decay once again. At Sacrifice, The IInspiration lost the titles to The Influence (Madison Rayne and Tenille Dashwood). On 27 April, McKay and McIntosh requested their immediate release from Impact Wrestling, they announced on their Twitter accounts.

=== Total Nonstop Action Wrestling (2025–2026) ===
On 6 June 2025, during Against All Odds, McKay and Lee made their Total Nonstop Action Wrestling (TNA) return, formerly known as Impact Wrestling, confronting the Knockouts World Tag Team Champions The Elegance Brand (Ash by Elegance and Heather by Elegance). They won the titles during the TV Tapings on September 27, 2025, but lost the titles back to The Elegance Brand (Heather by Elegance and M by Elegance) on Thursday Night Impact!'s AMC debut on January 15, 2026.

=== All Elite Wrestling (2026–present) ===
McKay and her tag team partner Cassie Lee made their All Elite Wrestling (AEW) debut as The IInspiration, and announced that they had signed with the promotion at a house show in Brisbane, Australia, on 15 February 2026. They made their in-ring debut on the 4 March episode of Dynamite, losing to The Brawling Birds (Alex Windsor and Jamie Hayter) in a squash match.

=== Tokyo Joshi Pro-Wrestling (2026–present) ===
On 17 March 2026, The Iinspiration made their Tokyo Joshi Pro-Wrestling (TJPW) debut during the first day of an event in the United States, where they defeated Shoko Nakajima and Wakana Uehara. On 23 March, during the Grand Princess event, they defeated Ober Eats (Yuki Kamifuku and Wakana Uehara) to win the Princess Tag Team Championship. On 16 April, they had their first successful title defense against Kyoraku Kyomei (Hyper Misao and Shoko Nakajima). On May 4, The Iinspiration lost their title to Hakuchuumu (Miu Watanabe and Rika Tatsumi), ending their reign at 36 days.

== Acting career ==
On 29 April 2022, the filmmaker Michael Matteo Rossi confirmed that McKay would star in his upcoming film The Charisma Killers. It was also revealed that McKay's character in the film would be Swinger Wife Claire.

== Other media ==
J McKay Does

YouTube information
- Channel: J McKay Does
- Years active: 2020–present
- Genre: vlog
- Subscribers: 24 thousand
- Views: 346.9 thousand
- Last updated: 10 March 2021

As Billie Kay, McKay made her WWE video game debut as a playable character in WWE 2K18, having since appeared in WWE 2K19, WWE 2K20 and WWE 2K22.

On 19 August 2020, McKay launched her own YouTube channel called J McKay Does.

On 16 May 2021, McKay, along with long time tag team partner and best friend Cassandra McIntosh, launched a comedy and variety podcast titled Off Her Chops.

== Filmography ==
Film
Year	Title	Role	Notes
2011	Mikey's Extreme Romance	Bekky	
2023	Zombie, My Friend	Samantha	Short film
2023	The Dark Knight Chronicles (FanMade)	Sarah Essen	Short film
2024	The Charisma Killers	Swinger Wife Claire	
TBA	Twisted Tales from Channel 6	Clarissa Hex	Upcoming film
TBA	Maverick	Farah Sylvane	Upcoming film

Television
Year	Title	Role	Notes
2015	WWE Breaking Ground	Herself	2 episodes
2018-2019	Ride Along	Herself	2 episodes
2020	Celtic Warrior Workouts	Herself	episode 43
2024	Blue Ridge: The Series	Kodiak	Episode: “Heels and Faces”

== Personal life ==
McKay has a son. On August 28, 2026, McKay announced that she is expecting a second child.

== Championships and accomplishments ==
- Impact Wrestling / Total Nonstop Action Wrestling
  - Impact / TNA Knockouts World Tag Team Championship (2 times) – with Cassie Lee
- Pro Wrestling Women's Alliance
  - PWWA Championship (2 times)
- Pro Wrestling Illustrated
  - Ranked No. 34 of the top 50 female wrestlers in the PWI Female 50 in 2012
  - Ranked No. 50 of the top 50 tag teams in the PWI Tag Team 50 in 2020 – with Peyton Royce
- Tokyo Joshi Pro-Wrestling
  - Princess Tag Team Championship (1 time) – with Cassie Lee
- Women's Wrestling Fan Awards
  - Most Underrated Wrestler of the Year (2018) – with Peyton Royce
- WWE
  - WWE Women's Tag Team Championship (1 time) – with Peyton Royce
  - NXT Year-End Award (1 time)
    - Breakout of the Year (2016) – with Peyton Royce
