= Chase (2019 film) =

- Directed by: Michael Matteo Rossi
- Written by: Michael Matteo Rossi
- Produced by: Jane Badler; Katrina Nelson; Michael Matteo Rossi; Rob Niter
- Starring: Damien Puckler
- Cinematography: Jason Weary
- Edited by: Gehrig Burnett Jr.
- Music by: Salil Bhayani
- Release date: May 14, 2019
- Country: United States
- Language: English

Chase is a 2019 American action thriller film directed and written by Michael Matteo Rossi. The film stars Damien Puckler, Aries Spears, Richard Riehle, Oghenekaro Itene, Jessica Morris, Simeon Panda, Rob Niter and Skye Townsend.

== Plot ==
Chase, a muscular hitman, must prove his loyalty to his mentor and best friend, while his girlfriend wants to leave the business behind them.

== Cast ==
- Damien Puckler as Chase
- Aries Spears as Miles
- Richard Riehle as Turley
- Oghenekaro Itene as Jayla
- Jessica Morris as Blair
- Skye Townsend as Lola
- Rachel Alig as Megan
- Devanny Pinn as Jessie
- Harry Hains as Burke
- Rob Niter as Nathan
- Simeon Panda as Caleb
- Felix Martinsson as Young Chase
- Paul Dike as Sergey
- Joaquin Garay III as Hector
- Amor Sanchez as Nurse Lopez
- Victor Boneva as Edson

== Awards ==
Chase won the Best Action Film Award at the Hollywood Reel Independent Film Festival.
