= Itene =

Itene may refer to:

- Itene language, Bolivia
- Oghenekaro Itene, Nigerian actor
