= Skye Townsend =

American actress

- Born: Skylar Christan Townsend; September 1, 1993 (age 33); Santa Monica, California, U.S.
- Occupations: Actress; singer-songwriter
- Years active: 2011–present
- Father: Robert Townsend
- Website: www.skyetownsend.com

Skylar Christan "Skye" Townsend (born September 1, 1993) is an American actress and singer. She has released two EPs, Vomit (2012) and Rocking Chairs (2015). Townsend joined the main cast of A Black Lady Sketch Show in 2021. and began appearing as Courtney on the sixth season of the CBS television sitcom The Neighborhood. She was born in Santa Monica, California.

== Acting ==
Townsend made in August 2011 her acting debut on BET web series 8 Days a Week, portraying the character "Jade Taylor". The show ended after 10 episodes. Skye completed a film titled Playin' for Love in 2013, playing the character Maya Hardaway the lead cheerleader. She guest starred in the popular TV series Lucifer as Axara. She has also been cast as Lola in the feature film Chase, shot in summer 2018. As of 2021, Townsend is starring in A Black Lady Sketch Show. She also appeared in on an episode of the 2021 iCarly revival series, which also features her A Black Lady Sketch Show co-star Laci Mosley.

== Music career ==
=== 2012: Recording and releasing Vomit EP ===
Townsend released her debut EP album Vomit online via Digital Download on May 5, 2012. The EP featured collaborations from artist like Karina Pasian & Chris O'Bannon" on ("Go Fish!"), "Micky Munday" on ("Hazel") and Wyann Vaughn on ("Free") inspired by Deniece Williams's 1976 hit "Free". The majority of Vomit was produced by Jonathan "JMBeatz" Malone, Waren Vaughn, Vybe, Rey Reel and more. Later on, videos were directed by her father Robert Townsend, for "Go Fish" and "It's Normal" during the month of June 2012.

=== 2015: Recording and releasing Rocking Chairs EP ===
In mid to late 2014, Townsend began constructing her second studio EP album, titled Rocking Chairs. The project included 5 tracks along with a feature from rapper, "DEVEY2G" on a song, titled "Always".

== Personal life ==
She is the daughter of actor, director, and comedian Robert Townsend and Cheri Jones.

== Filmography ==
=== Film ===
Year	Title	Role	Notes
2019	Chase	Lola	
2021	Donny's Bar Mitzvah	Aiymah	
2022	Fake It Til You Make It	Kira	Short

=== Television ===
Year	Title	Role	Notes
2011	8 Days a Week	Jade Taylor	10 episodes
2017	Legends of Chamberlain Heights		1 episode
2018	Lucifer	Axara	1 episode
2019	The Donors	Siliva	7 episodes
2021	iCarly	Kiki	1 episode
2021–2023	A Black Lady Sketch Show	Various Characters	18 episodes
2022	Christmas Party Crashers	Tara Aries	TV movie
2023	Pretty Stoned	Leila	TV movie
2023	Family Guy		1 episode; Voice
2023	A Christmas Serenade	Willow	TV movie
2024–2026	The Neighborhood	Courtney Pridgeon	Recurring role (season 6); Main cast (season 7)
2026	MP3	Dr. Muse-Tina	Main cast

== Discography ==
=== Extended play ===
Title	Album details
Vomit (EP)	Released: May 5, 2012; Format: Free download/Digital Download; Label: Independent

Title	Album details
Rocking Chairs	Released: January 25, 2015; Format: Digital Download; Label: THA NEW HOLLYWOOD/NEW HOLLYWOOD PRODUCTIONS

=== Notable songs ===
- 2012: "Go Fish!" (Produced by JM)
- 2012: "Its Normal" (Produced by JM)
- 2013: "Noreg" (Produced by IrateGenius & KayJayBeatz)
- 2013: "X-Talk" (Produced by Augie Ray)
- 2013: "Pineapple Diet (ft. Micky Munday)" (Produced by Drupiano)
- 2015: "Rocking Chairs" (produced by JM)
- 2015: "Always (ft. DEVEY2G)" (produced by JM)
