= Esohe =

2018 Nigerian epic fantasy thriller film

- Directed by: Charles Uwagbai; Robert O'Peters
- Written by: Bimbo Manuel
- Produced by: Robert O'Peters, Charles Uwagbai
- Starring: Jemima Osunde; Jimmy Jean-Louis; Oghenekaro Itene; Omo Godwyn Williams; Chris Attoh
- Cinematography: Fabian Hooks; Emeka Madu; Austin Nwaolie
- Edited by: Jude Legema
- Release date: 28 November 2018; (Nigeria)
- Running time: 102 minutes
- Country: Nigeria
- Languages: English; Yoruba
- Budget: $100,000 (estd.)

Esohe, is a 2018 Nigerian epic fantasy thriller film co-directed by Charles Uwagbai and Robert O'Peters and co-produced by Robert O'Peters. The film stars Jemima Osunde in lead role along with Jimmy Jean-Louis. Oghenekaro Itene, Omo Godwyn Williams and Chris Attoh made supportive roles and an ensemble cast. The film revolves around Gary Barbar, who suffers repeated nightmares and later unveils as the reincarnation and reunion of Ifagbai, the son of Eghosa the Oba’s warrior, his long-lost lover, Esohe.

The film has been shot in Benin City, Nigeria. The film received mostly positive critical acclaim, and was screened worldwide. In 2018, at the Africa Movie Academy Awards, the film was nominated for five award categories: Best Actor in a Leading Role, Best Actress in a Supporting Role, Achievement in Visual Effect, Achievement in Make-up, and Achievement in Costume Design. In USA, the film became a blockbuster.

== Cast ==
- Jemima Osunde as Esohe
- Jimmy Jean-Louis as Gary Babar
- Chris Attoh as Ifagbai
- Oghenekaro Itene as Itohan
- Omo Godwyn Williams as Chief Eghosa
- Toyin Abraham as Titilola
- Precious Aibangbee as Efosa
- Kristy Butler as Tricia
- Solo Clinton as Civilized Villager
- Kyle Colton as Damian
- Omosigho Edward as Chief
- Aimienofona Efekomwan as Ehi
- Osagie Elegbe as Police officer
- Desmond Elliot as Johnny Payne
- Afolayan Eniola as Osagie
- Legemah Henry as Ezomo
- Michael Isokpan as Loot
- Emmanuel Issah as Police Man
- Opute Joel as Farmer
- Loveth Leonard as Receptionist
- Misty Lockheart as Claire
- Bimbo Manuel as Catechist
- Ufuoma McDermott as Eno
- Omo-Osaghie Utete Megiabi as Priest
- Ehigiator Joy Nosa as Abieyuwa
- Helen Enado Odigie as Queen
- Eunice Omorogie as Ohen
- Patience Omoruyi as Mama Patric
- Osayande Onaghise as Leader
- Andrew Otamere as Old man
- Joel Rogers as Professor James
- Igiebor Osagie Solution as Osa
- Monica Swaida as Esosa
- Omoye Uzamere as Iyen
- Margaret Madu Vilvens as Melissa
