= Rob Niter =

American actor and bodybuilder (b. 1982)

- Born: July 29, 1982 (age 43); Memphis, Tennessee, U.S.
- Occupation: Actor

Rob Niter (born 1982) is an American actor and professional bodybuilder.

== Background ==
Niter serves as a chief master sergeant in the United States Air Force. He has received recognition in several military sources as a fitness trainer; and for winning bodybuilding and fitness championships. In 2013, he performed cardiopulmonary resuscitation on a man for 25 minutes and brought him back to life. Niter told Houston Chronicle, “Sure it’s nice to be recognized, but it’s not about an award or a medal. The feeling of knowing that you saved someone’s life is truly an amazing feeling. Knowing that our actions that day prevented someone from dying and gave them another chance.” He was later honored as a hero of Houston by then, mayor Annise Parker. Niter also appeared on WCBD-TV news in 2020 for orchestrating military events to honor the courage and patriotism of the more than 80,000 Prisoner of War and Missing in Action heroes still missing from wars and past conflicts.

== Career ==
Niter's notable acting role was in David Gordon Green's, Halloween thriller. He is expected to cast as a sheriff in the movie alongside actress and author, Jamie Lee Curtis. According to The Post & Courier, Niter expressed his excitement about the film. "I can't wait to meet Jamie Lee Curtis. It's exciting to be around all this talent," said Niter. According to Generation Iron and Muscle Insider news, Niter is expected to co-produce and make a cameo appearance in the film, Chase.

== Filmography ==
Film
Title	Role	Director	Year	Notes
Halloween (2018 film)	Deputy Sheriff	David Gordon Green	2018	

Television
Title	Role	Director	Year	Notes #
The Gym	Himself	Knighten Richman	2014	TV series
Killing Fields (TV series)	Agent	Barry Levinson	2017	TV series
The Inspectors	U.S. Postal Inspector	Bryan Curb	2017	TV series
Mr. Mercedes (TV series)	Officer Johnson	Jack Bender	2017	TV series
Music and Murder	Capt. Terrell Vance	Greg Galloway	2018	TV series

== Major awards ==
- 2013 – Houston Fire Department#16 Commendation Medal for life-saving actions
- 2013 – City of Houston Commendation Medal by then, mayor Annise Parker
- 2013 – United States Air Force Commendation Medal for acts of heroism in life-saving actions
- 2013 – Honored as Hero of Houston
