= Zoey Skye =

American professional wrestler

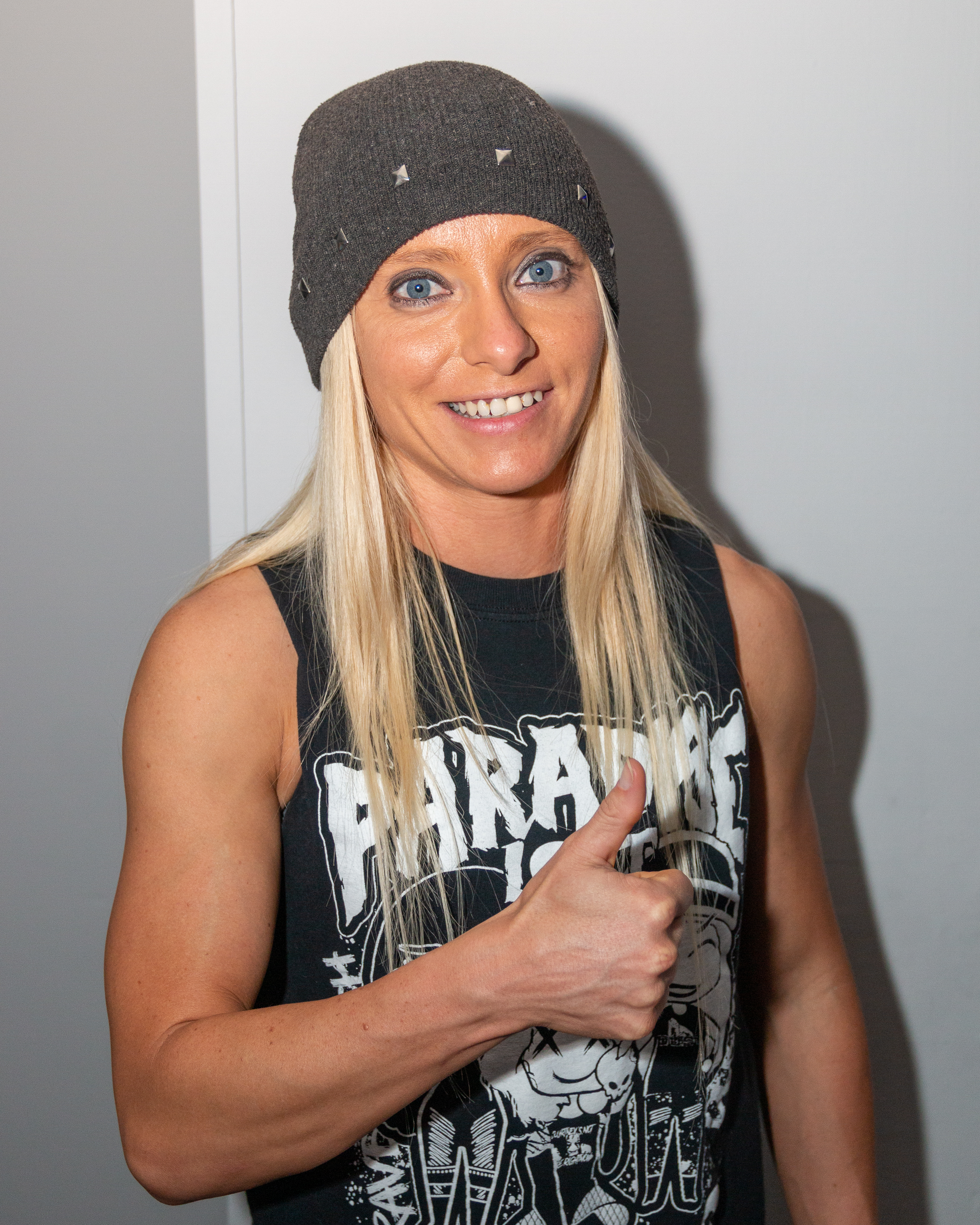
- Skye in 2019

Personal information
- Born: 1988 or 1989 (age 37–38) Lordstown, Ohio, United States
- Website: shopzoeyskye.com

Professional wrestling career
- Ring names: Angel Dust; Dust; Zoey Skye; Zoey Lynn
- Billed height: 5 ft 0 in (1.52 m)
- Billed weight: 99 lb (45 kg)
- Trained by: Johnny Gargano; JT Lightning
- Debut: 2007

Zoey Skye is an American professional wrestler, known for her work on the independent circuit, where she was previously known as Angel Dust or simply Dust. Starting her career in 2007, she initially appeared primarily for promotions in her home state of Ohio before branching out to other promotions across the United States. Skye has performed for promotions such as Rise Wrestling, Major League Wrestling, and Shimmer Women Athletes, where she became the promotion's final SHIMMER Champion at its last ever show in October 2021. She was also previously a Heart of SHIMMER Champion. Additionally, in 2018 and 2020 Skye toured Japan as part of the World Wonder Ring Stardom roster and in 2023 she began making appearances for national promotion All Elite Wrestling and its sister promotion Ring of Honor.

== Championships and accomplishments ==
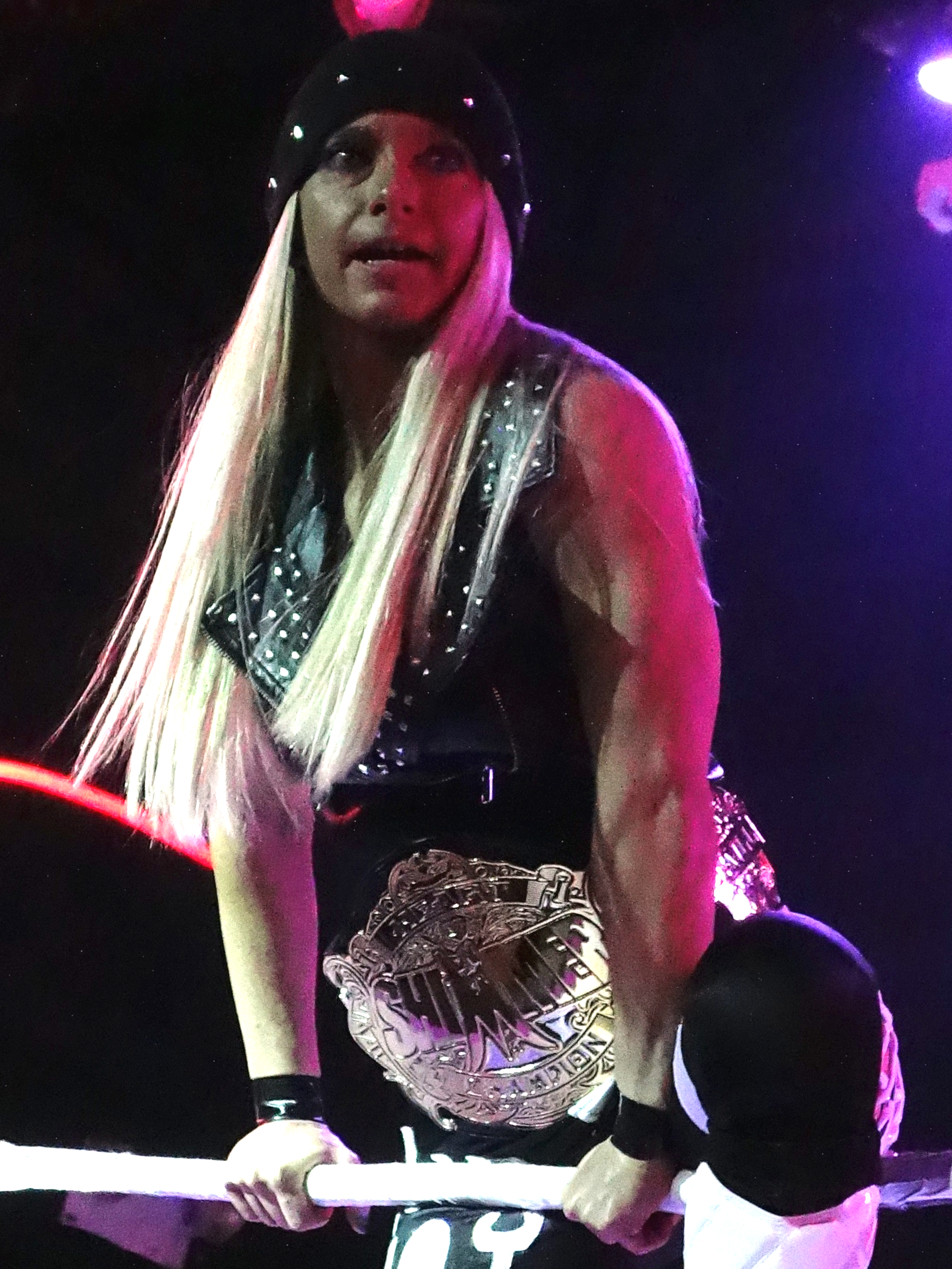
Dust as the Heart of SHIMMER Champion in 2019

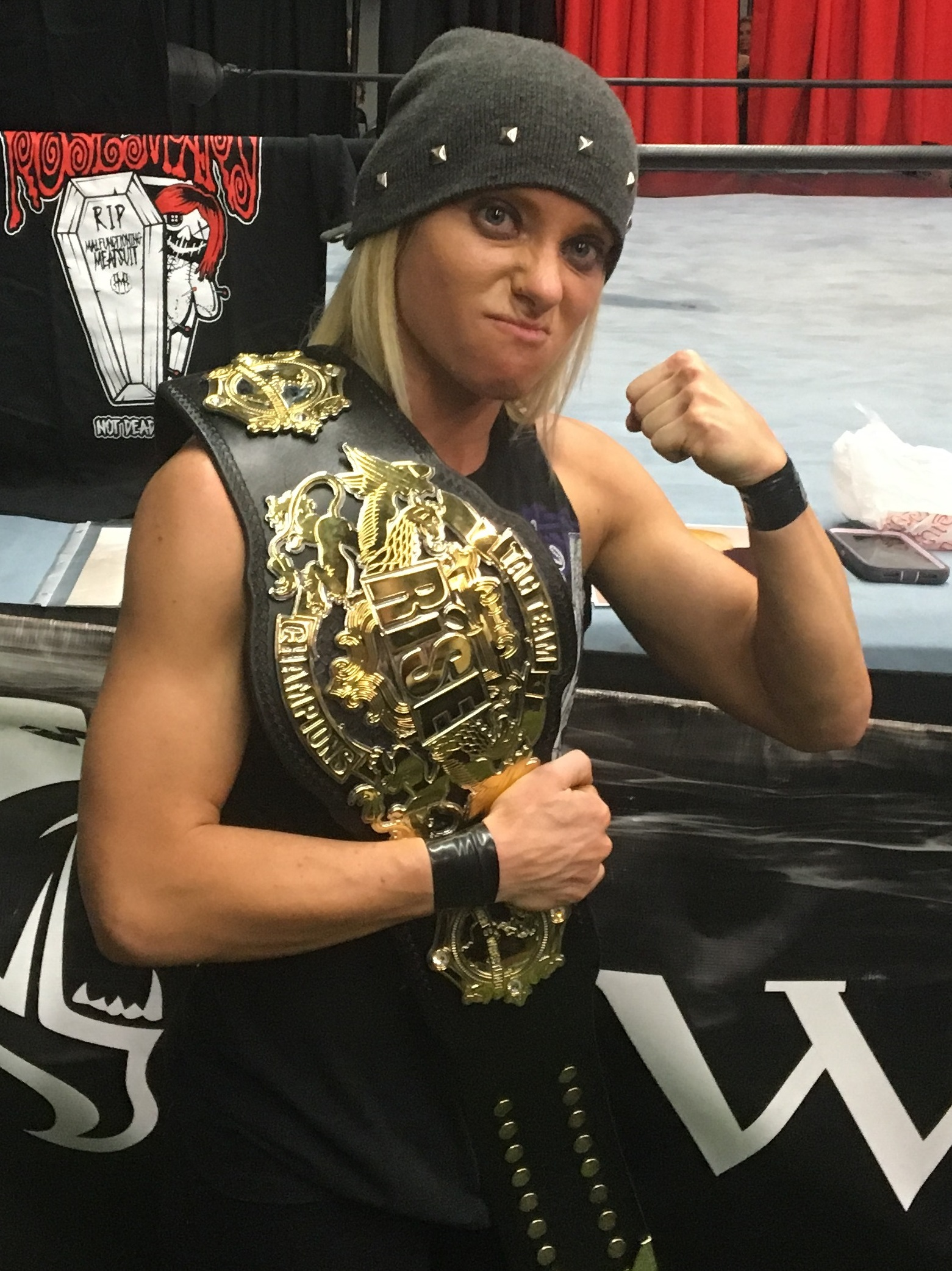
Dust as one half of the Guardians of Rise Champions in 2018

- Absolute Intense Wrestling
  - AIW Women's Championship (1 time)
- Shimmer Women Athletes
  - SHIMMER Championship (1 time, final)
  - Heart of Shimmer Championship (1 time)
- Rise Wrestling
  - Phoenix of Rise Championship (1 time)
  - Guardians of Rise Championship (1 time) – With Raven's Ash
