= Michael Matteo Rossi =

American filmmaker

- Born: June 1, 1987 (age 39); Los Angeles, California
- Occupations: Director, writer, producter

Michael Matteo Rossi (born June 1, 1987) is an American film director, writer, and producer.

He is best known for his action thriller film Chase, released through Vertical Entertainment starring Damien Puckler, Aries Spears and Jessica Morris and won the Best Action Feature award at the Hollywood Reel Film festival.

Rossi is also known for his feature film Misogynist, which starred Jonathan Bennett, Eve Mauro and Tracey Bregman and won best narrative feature at the Los Angeles Underground Film Festival.

Rossi was a producer of the action film The Handler.

Rossi's most recent production is Censor Addiction, which was shot on location in Los Angeles in early 2024, entering post-production in April 2024.

Rossi announced on May 27, 2025, he is launching a talent management division under his Italian Cowboy Productions banner.

Rossi announced that Censor Addiction would be released on streaming platforms and DVD on March 3, 2026.
