= Oghenekaro Itene =

Nigerian actress

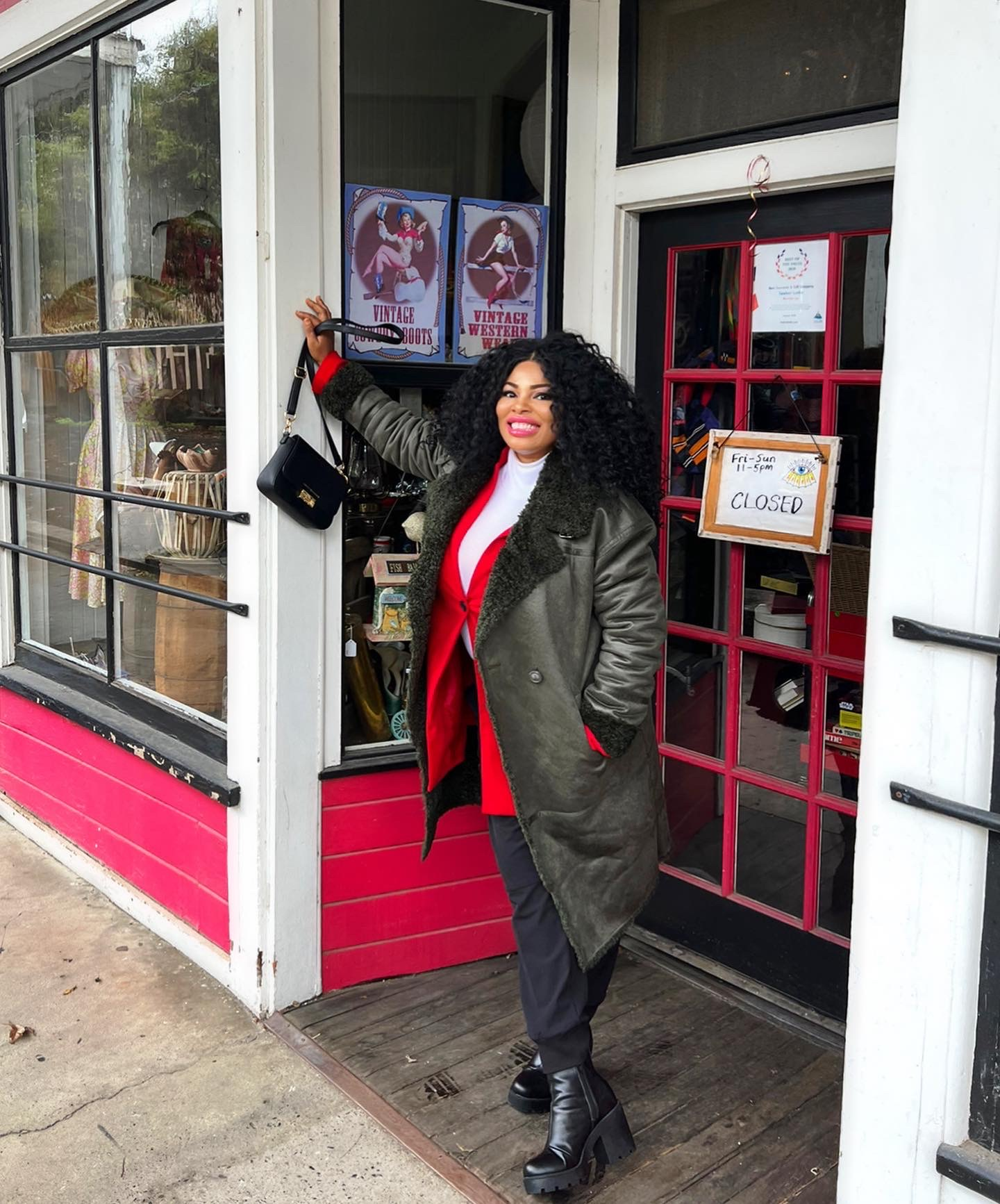
- Born: October 24; Nigeria
- Education: University of Benin
- Occupations: Actress, humanitarian, entrepreneur
- Known for: Tinsel
- Website: oghenekaroitene.com

Oghenekaro Lydia Itene is an American actress of Nigerian heritage, as well as a businesswoman and humanitarian. She is the founder of the Agnes Fikieme Foundation, an organization dedicated to enhancing the standard of living in ommunities through advocacy, mentorship, and access to basic necessities.

== Early life ==
Oghenekaro Itene hails from Isoko, Delta state and was born and raised in Benin City, a town in Edo State, Southern Nigeria. She is a graduate of the University of Benin. The youngest of six children, she quickly learned to express herself through performance. Her first encounter with acting was at age eight when she joined the drama club in her primary school.

== Career ==
Itene's acting debut came in 2013 in Shattered Mirror, a feature film directed by Lancelot Imasuen Oduwa, portraying Reverend Sister. Onyinye announced Itene as one to watch out for. She appeared as Simi in Lincoln's Clan drama series produced by Total Recall/ content Africa, A pan Africa Project. Her original plan was to work on one or two film projects and concentrate on her company Kadia Makeovers as a makeup artist. She stayed away from acting for a little under one year, returning in 2015, when she landed a role in Mnet Africa series Tinsel, as the wedding planner.

She appeared as Sonia in the feature film Glass House by Africa Magic Original Films/Mnet Production released in 2016, followed by the feature film, The Prodigal in which she played Tessy. In 2016, Itene landed a role in her first big-screen movie Esohe directed by Charles Uwagbai in the role Itohan. Itene completed a US tour where the movie Esohe premiered. Esohe was selected to screen in Nollywood Travel festival in Toronto and was released in cinemas later that year in the United States, United Kingdom, Europe, and Nigeria.

== Selected filmography ==
=== Selected films ===
- Shattered Mirror (2014) as Sister Onyinye
- Jackie Goes to School (2014) as Maid
- Born Again Sisters (2015)
- The Prodigal (2015)
- Glass House (2015)
- ATM (2016) as Ogene
- Esohe (2017) as Itohan
- Away From Home (2016)
- The Quest (2015)
- Chase (2019) as Jayla

=== Television ===
- Tinsel (2008) as wedding planner
- Lincoln Clan
- The Sanctuary as Adaora

== See also ==
- List of Nigerian actors
- List of Nigerian entrepreneurs
