= Commendation Medal (disambiguation) =

Commendation Medal may refer to:

- Commendation Medal, a mid-level United States military decoration presented for sustained acts of heroism or meritorious service
- Pingat Kepujian (Commendation Medal), Singaporean civil commendation medal
- Pingat Penghargaan (Tentera) (Commendation Medal (Military)), Singaporean military commendation medal
