= Madison Eagles =

Australian professional wrestler

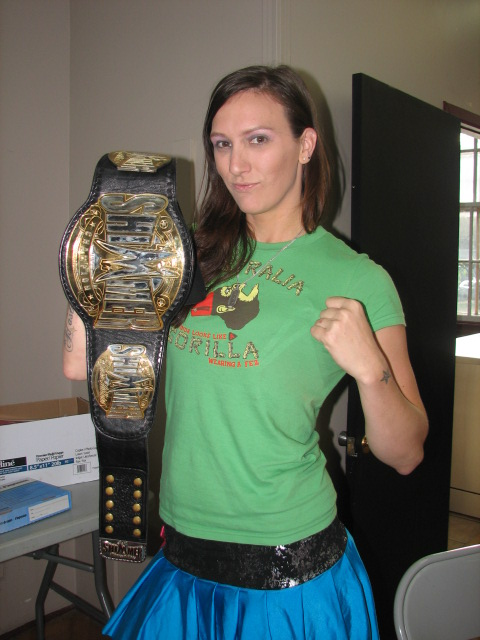
- Eagles in June 2011 during her first reign as SHIMMER Champion

Personal information
- Born: Alexandra Ford; 5 June 1984 (age 42) Sydney, New South Wales, Australia
- Spouse: Michael Spencer
- Children: 4

Professional wrestling career
- Ring name: Madison Eagles
- Billed height: 6 ft 1 in (1.85 m)
- Billed weight: 155 lb (70 kg)
- Billed from: Sydney, Australia
- Trained by: International Wrestling Australia; Claudio Castagnoli; Mike Quackenbush
- Debut: 2001
- Retired: 2020

Alexandra Ford (born 5 June 1984) is a retired Australian professional wrestler, better known by her ring name Madison Eagles. She has wrestled internationally in Australia, the United States, Canada and Japan, and is a former two-time Shimmer Champion. She was ranked by Pro Wrestling Illustrated as the number one female wrestler in the PWI Female 50 in 2011; as of 2022, she is one of two women to win the award without ever competing for a major promotion (WWE, Total Nonstop Action Wrestling (TNA), New Japan Pro Wrestling (NJPW) or All Elite Wrestling (AEW)).

== Early life ==
Ford's father, Graham, is the head of Surf Life Saving Australia. She attended St Catherine's School, Waverley, where she participated in athletics, gymnastics, and diving.

== Professional wrestling career ==
=== Early years and training (2001-2007) ===
At the age of 17, Eagles began her professional wrestling training at International Wrestling Australia (IWA), at their training school in mid-2001.

Eagles debuted soon thereafter as the bodyguard for A.J. Freeley in IWA. Eagles had her first official match in November that year, against Katherine Nixxon. Eagles is a former four-time IWA Women's Champion. In 2003, Eagles traveled to the United States with trainer and owner of IWA, Mark Mercedes. She competed in a try out at Ohio Valley Wrestling (OVW), a former developmental territory for World Wrestling Entertainment (WWE). In her time in OVW, Eagles trained alongside such wrestlers as Christopher Daniels, Elijah Burke, and Jillian Hall. While in the U.S., Eagles wrestled for Heartland Wrestling Association (HWA), Cleveland All Pro Wrestling (CAPW), and USA Pro. At different points in her career, Eagles trained at the Chikara Wrestle Factory in Philadelphia, the Ring of Honor (ROH) school, and PWA school in Sydney, Australia.

=== Pro Wrestling Women's Alliance (2007-2013) ===
In 2007, Eagles and her husband Ryan Eagles founded Pro Wrestling Alliance Elite, which later became Pro Wrestling Alliance Australia (known as PWA), and an all-women's wrestling promotion, Pro Wrestling Women's Alliance (PWWA). The promotions were created on the back of Eagles opening a professional wrestling school, and were intended to encourage Australian wrestlers to travel between states in the country. She has held the PWWA Championship.

PWWA ran from 2007 until around 2013 when the last recorded all women's event was held. It was the only all women's wrestling promotion in Australia.

=== International exploits (2008–2011) ===
From 2008 to 2011, Eagles wrestled in several other wrestling promotions, including the American promotions Ring of Honor, Chikara, Combat Zone Wrestling and New England Championship Wrestling. She has also wrestled in Canada for NCW Femmes Fatales, and in Japan for the Joshi 4 Hope event.

=== Shimmer Women Athletes (2008-2018) ===
==== Teaming with Jessie McKay (2008–2009) ====
Eagles started wrestling for the American all-female promotion Shimmer Women Athletes in October 2008, where she made her debut at Volume 21 together with Jessie McKay as "The Pink Ladies"; they participated in a gauntlet match to crown the first Shimmer Tag Team Champions but were the first team eliminated. Eagles' first singles match in Shimmer saw her lose to Sara Del Rey on Volume 23.

==== Shimmer Champion (2010–2012) ====
At Volume 30, Eagles defeated Cheerleader Melissa to become number one contender for the Shimmer Championship and went on to defeat champion MsChif to capture the title on 11 April 2010 at Volume 31. Eagles went on to rack up nine successful title defenses against several wrestlers including Cheerleader Melissa, Ayumi Kurihara, Jessie McKay, Mercedes Martinez, Ayako Hamada, Serena Deeb and Hiroyo Matsumoto, as well as defending the title for the first time ever in PWWA and successfully retaining against McKay and Nicole Matthews in a triple–threat match. On 2 October 2011 at Volume 43, Eagles teamed with Sara Del Rey in an unsuccessful attempt against Hamada and Kurihara for the Shimmer Tag Team Championship. Later that night, on Volume 44, Eagles faced Melissa in a rematch for the Shimmer Championship, which Melissa won, ending Eagles' reign at 539 days.

After the Shimmer tapings, Eagles wrestled a match that same month and suffered a career-threatening knee injury from a bad landing after jumping off the ropes. Eagles was later awarded the top spot in Pro Wrestling Illustrated magazine's ranking of the top 50 female wrestlers in 2011, despite Eagles not wrestling for the largest American wrestling promotions such as World Wrestling Entertainment or Total Nonstop Action Wrestling.

==== Return and various feuds (2012–2014) ====
In January 2013, Eagles returned to the ring after being absent due to injury and delivering her third child. Three months later, on 6 April at Volume 53 in New Jersey, in her return to Shimmer, Eagles defeated her protégé and former tag team partner, Jessie McKay. On Volume 54, Eagles competed in a fatal–four way number one contender's match for the SHIMMER Championship against Athena, Courtney Rush and Saraya Knight, which was won by Courtney Rush. Throughout Volume 55 and Volume 61, Eagles scored victories over wrestlers including Kana, Athena, Courtney Rush, Mia Yim, Jessicka Havok and Hikaru Shida, before being put in a tag team match with Nicole Matthews against Kellie Skater and Tomoka Nakagawa for the Shimmer Tag Team Championship, which they lost due to miscommunication. Week later at the Volume 63, Eagles broke her wrist during a match against Heidi Lovelace, which she won, but continued to compete throughout the night on Volume 64 in a fatal–four way match against Courtney Rush, Evie and Nicole Matthews, which Rush won.

==== Second Shimmer Championship reign and final SHIMMER appearances (2015–2018) ====
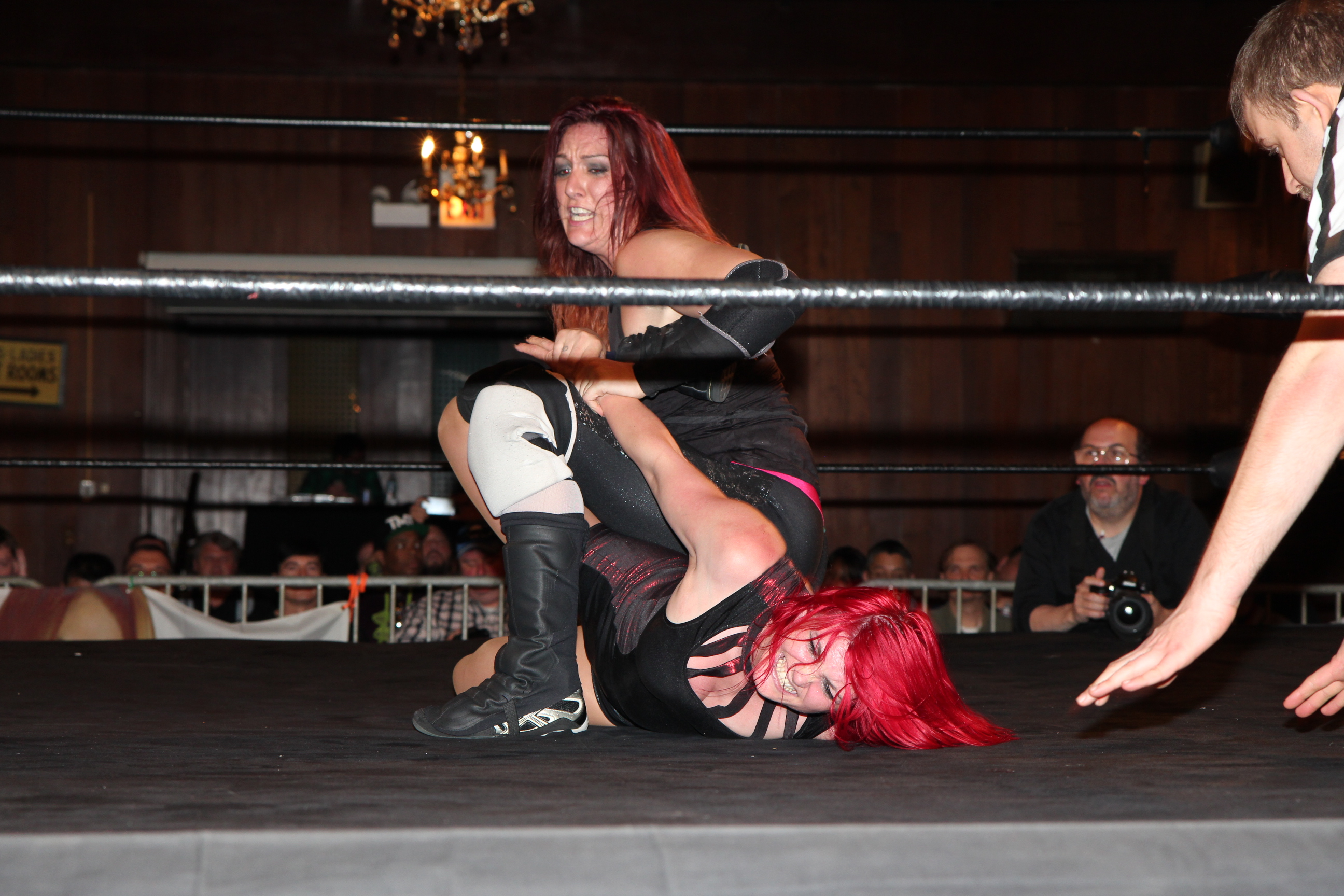
Eagles placing Sweet Saraya in a submission hold during a SHIMMER match in 2015

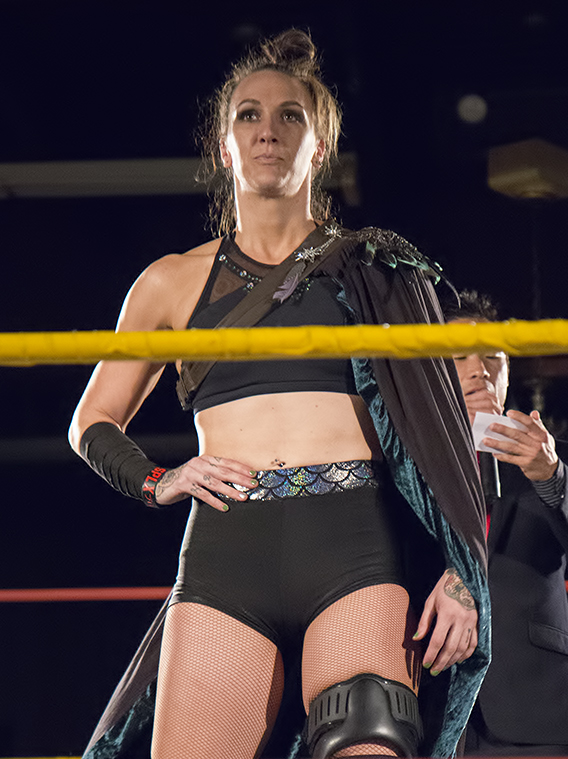
Eagles appearing in SHIMMER in 2018

On 18 October 2014, at Volume 67, Eagles, this time working as a face, returned after sustaining an arm injury and fought Nicole Matthews in a no countouts and no disqualifications match which ended in a draw. Later that night, at Volume 68, Eagles competed in a fatal four–way elimination match against Athena, Cheerleader Melissa and Nicole Matthews for the Shimmer Championship, which Mathews won with lastly eliminating Eagles, after a distraction provided by Matthews' tag team partner, Portia Perez, helped her hit Eagles with a fireball and win the title. The feud between the two continued on Volume 69, where Eagles attacked Matthews after her match with Evie. On 11 April 2015, at Volume 73, after a confrontion between Eagles and The Canadian NINJAs, Eagles defeated Perez in a number one contender's match, but went on to lose to Matthews in a title match on the next day at Volume 74.

A few months later, on 10 October, during the tapings of Volume 76, Eagles unsuccessfully competed in a number one contender's battle royal when Matthews and Perez interfered. As a result, Eagles and Matthews faced off in a no disqualification match at Volume 77, with Eagles defeating Matthews to win the Shimmer Championship for the record–setting second time. The next night, at Volume 78, Eagles successfully retained her championship against Nicole Savoy. On 26 June 2016, Eagles lost the title to the returning Mercedes Martinez.

=== Shine Wrestling (2013–2020) ===
Eagles also made sporadic appearances and participated in the Shine series with her debut being held in mid-April 2013 on Shine 9 losing to Jessicka Havok in a tournament match for the Shine Championship. Few months later, in October, Eagles returned competing in the promotion in a match against Amazing Kong, which Kong won. On Shine 22, Eagles unsuccessfully challenged Ivelisse for the Shine Championship. After missing a few shows, Eagles returned to Shine and racked up victories over La Rosa Negra at Shine 26 and Su Yung at Shine 30.

=== Other promotions ===
After returning to wrestling, Eagles went on to compete for the PWA championship as well as competing in the Pacific Pro Wrestling promotion in her home country of Australia, where she became their inaugural Women's Champion, after a victory over Storm in mid-March. Eagles retained the championship against Shazza McKenzie and Storm, before losing it to Kellie Skater in September, ending her reign at 189 days. In 2014, Eagles again wrestled in Japan at World Wonder Ring Stardom, losing to Takumi Iroha.

== Personal life ==
Ford was married to fellow professional wrestler Douglas Ryan (better known under the ring name Ryan Eagles), with whom she has three children. She is now married to fellow professional wrestler Michael Spencer, with whom she has one child, making it her fourth overall. Her daughter, under the ring name MJ Eagles, made her professional wrestling debut as part of Pro Wrestling Australia's 2026 King of the Metro Rumble.

Ford is a fan of the American rock band AFI, and frequently uses their song "Prelude 12/21" as her entrance theme.

== Championships and accomplishments ==
- International Wrestling Australia (IWA)
  - IWA Women's Championship (4 times)
- New Horizon Pro Wrestling
  - IndyGurlz Australian Championship (1 time)
  - Global Conflict Shield Tournament (2016, 2018)
- Pacific Pro Wrestling
  - Pacific Women's Championship (1 time)
- Pro Wrestling Australia
  - PWA Tag Team Championship (1 time) – with Mick Moretti
- Pro Wrestling Women's Alliance (PWWA)
  - PWWA Championship (1 time)
- Pro Wrestling Illustrated
  - Ranked No. 1 of the top 50 female singles wrestlers in the PWI Female 50 in 2011
- Shimmer Women Athletes
  - Shimmer Championship (2 times)
