= Kimber Lee =

American professional wrestler (born 1990)

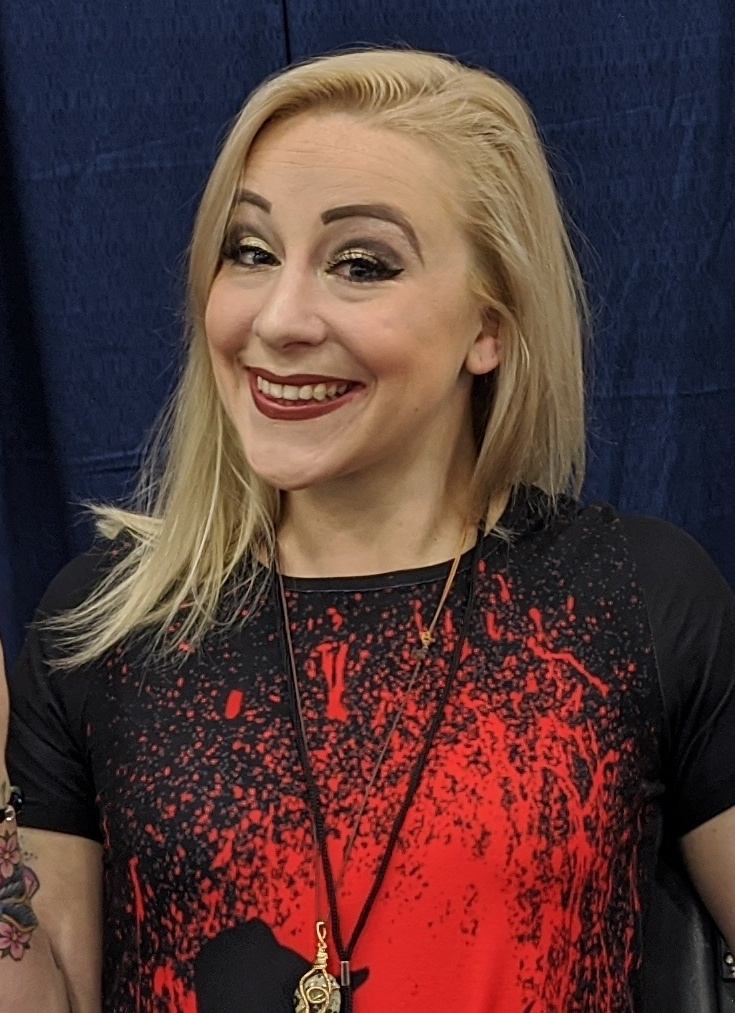
- Lee in 2019

Personal information
- Born: Kimberly Ann Frankele; June 27, 1990 (age 36) Seattle, Washington, U.S.
- Education: University of the Arts
- Spouse: Zachary Wentz (m. 2020; sep. 2022)

Professional wrestling career
- Ring name(s): Abbey Laith; Kimber Lee; Kimberly Frankele
- Billed height: 5 ft 4 in (1.63 m)
- Billed weight: 126 lb (57 kg)
- Billed from: Seattle, Washington
- Trained by: Combat Zone Wrestling Academy; Drew Gulak
- Debut: 2011
- Retired: May 6, 2023

Kimberly Ann Frankele (born June 27, 1990), better known by her ring name Kimber Lee, is an American retired professional wrestler. She is known for her work on both the American and international independent circuits, most notably as part of The Kimber Bombs alongside Cherry Bomb. Collectively, they have concurrently held both the Shine Tag Team Championship and the Shimmer Tag Team Championship. She has also formerly held the WSU Tag Team Championship along with Annie Social, and the Chikara Grand Championship as Princess KimberLee. She also wrestled for WWE between 2016 and 2018 as Abbey Laith and for Impact Wrestling between 2020 and 2022.

== Early life ==
Frankele was born and raised in Seattle, Washington. Originally aspiring to be a dancer, she trained in dance from an early age. She first became interested in professional wrestling as a teenager, and cites Chyna as her inspiration.

== Professional wrestling career ==
=== Combat Zone Wrestling (2011–2014) ===
After moving to Philadelphia, Pennsylvania to attend college, Frankele began training at the Combat Zone Wrestling Academy. The first woman to graduate from the school, she debuted as a wrestler in 2011 using the ring name Kimber Lee. Her first match for Combat Zone Wrestling (CZW) was on October 9, 2011, in which she defeated Austin Uzzie in an intergender match. In February 2012, she defeated Nevaeh, before losing to Alex Colon. In June 2012, Lee joined Drew Gulak's faction, A Campaign for a Better Combat Zone. As part of the faction, Lee and Gulak feuded with Greg Excellent, defeating him and Mia Yim in a mixed tag team match in September. Two months later, Lee defeated Excellent in a singles match, before Excellent and Momma Excellent defeated Lee and Gulak. Throughout 2013 and 2014, Lee continued to compete in CZW, participating in both women's and intergender matches. She faced wrestlers including Neveah, Christina Von Eerie, Candice LeRae, Alexxis Nevaeh, and Jessicka Havok in women's singles and tag team matches.

=== Women Superstars Uncensored (2012–2016) ===
Lee first began competing for Women Superstars Uncensored (WSU) in April 2012; as part of the promotion's J-Cup Tournament, she lost to Athena. That same month, she formed a tag team with Annie Social, with the pair losing their first match together to Rick Cataldo and Ezave Suena. At Full Steam Ahead in October, they lost to The Midwest Militia (Allysin Kay and Sassy Stephie). In May 2013, Lee entered the WSU Queen and King of the Ring tournament alongside Drew Gulak. They defeated Devon Moore and Mickie Knuckles and Ohio is for Killers (Nevaeh and Jake Crist) en route to the final, where they lost to A. R. Fox and Athena. Beginning to use the tag team name Chicks Using Nasty Tactics, Lee and Social defeated Jessie Brooks and Veda Scott to become the number one contenders to the WSU Tag Team Championship in August. On February 8, 2014, they defeated The Midwest Militia to win the WSU Tag Team Championship, and successfully defended the title against Christina Von Eerie and Nevaeh the same night. In May 2014, Lee and Gulak entered the Queen and King of the Ring tournament for the second time, but were eliminated by the World's Cutest Tag Team (Candice LeRae and Joey Ryan) in the semi-finals. After retaining the championship against Rick Cataldo and Veda Scott, they lost it to The Juicy Product (David Starr and J. T. Dunn) in July 2014, and failed to regain the title in a rematch in September. On February 21, 2015, Chicks Using Nasty Tactics defeated The Juicy Product to win the WSU Tag Team Championship for the second time. on February 13, 2016, they lost the titles to The Fella Twins at the 9th Anniversary Show.

=== Shine Wrestling (2013–2015, 2018) ===
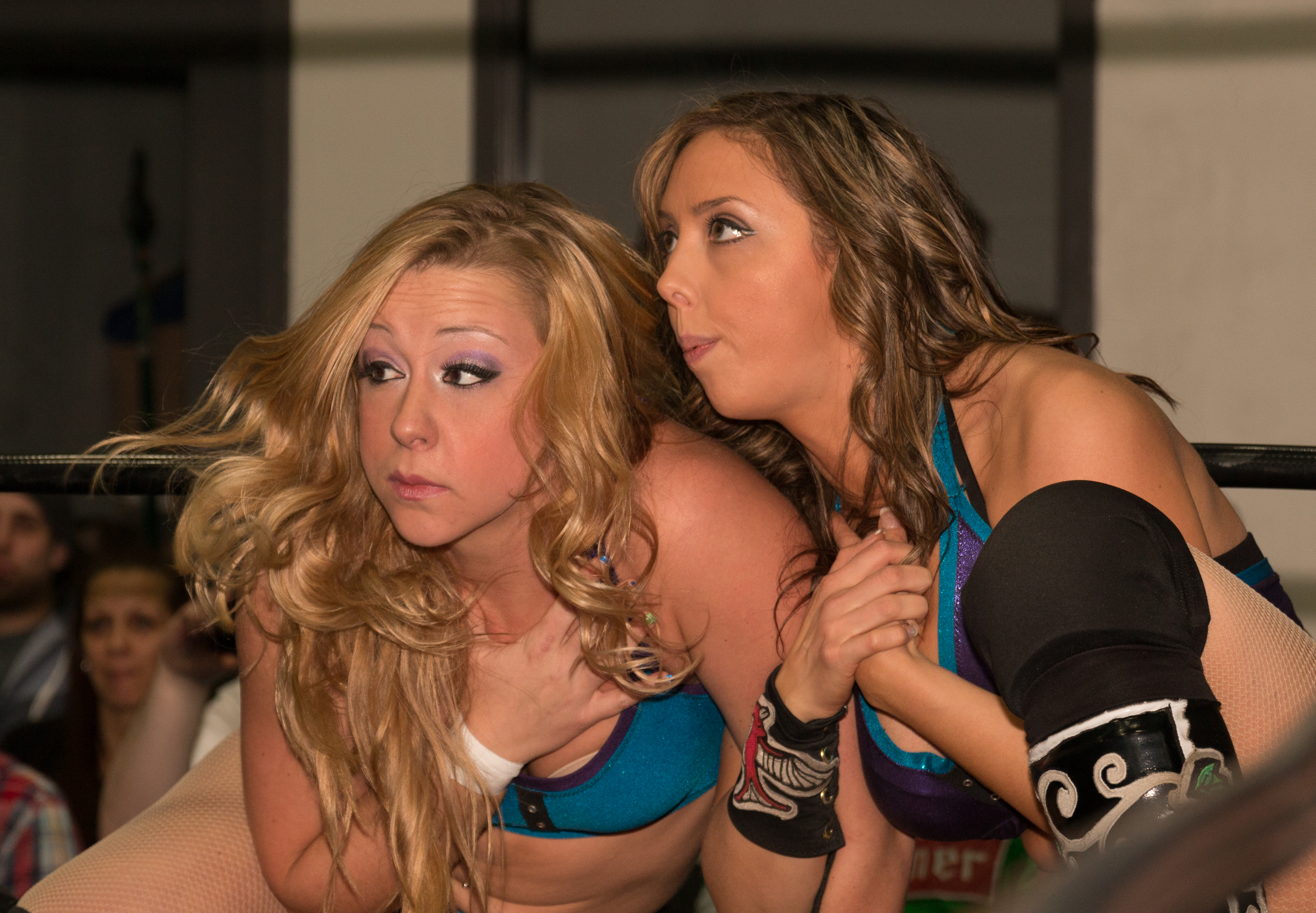
"The Kimber Bombs" Cherry Bomb (right) and Lee (left) in December 2014

Lee debuted for Shine Wrestling at their sixth show in January 2013, where she lost to Nikki Roxx. At Shine 12, she lost to Kimberly. Lee formed a tag team with Cherry Bomb, briefly called Team Combat Zone before being renamed The Kimber Bombs. She returned in February 2014 at Shine 17; The Kimber Bombs participated in the tournament to determine the inaugural Shine Tag Team Champions, but were eliminated in the first round by eventual winners The Lucha Sisters (Leva Bates and Mia Yim). The Kimber Bombs continued to compete in tag team competition, defeating the S-N-S Express (Sassy Stephie and Jessie Belle Smothers) at Shine 21, and unsuccessfully challenged Legendary (Malia Hosaka and Brandi Wine) for the Shine Tag Team Championship at Shine 23. In a rematch at Shine 25 on March 6, 2015, The Kimber Bombs won the championship. At Shine 30 on October 2, 2015, the pair had to vacate the title due to Cherry Bomb's shoulder injury.

=== Shimmer Women Athletes (2013–2021) ===
In April 2013, Lee made her debut for Shimmer Women Athletes at Shimmer 53. In October 2013, The Kimber Bombs unsuccessfully challenged 3G (Kellie Skater and Tomoka Nakagawa) for the Shimmer Tag Team Championship. Throughout 2014, The Kimber Bombs continued to compete in Shimmer's tag team division against teams including Leva Bates and Veda Scott, Ray and Leon, Bambi Hall and KC Cassidy, and The Buddy System (Heidi Lovelace and Solo Darling). On April 11, 2015, The Kimber Bombs defeated 3G to win the Shimmer Tag Team Championship. They lost the title to Evie and Heidi Lovelace on June 26, 2016.

On November 3, 2019, Lee won the Shimmer Championship in a four-way elimination match, where she defeated the champion Nicole Savoy as well as Priscilla Kelly and Shotzi Blackheart.

=== Chikara (2014–2016, 2018–2020) ===
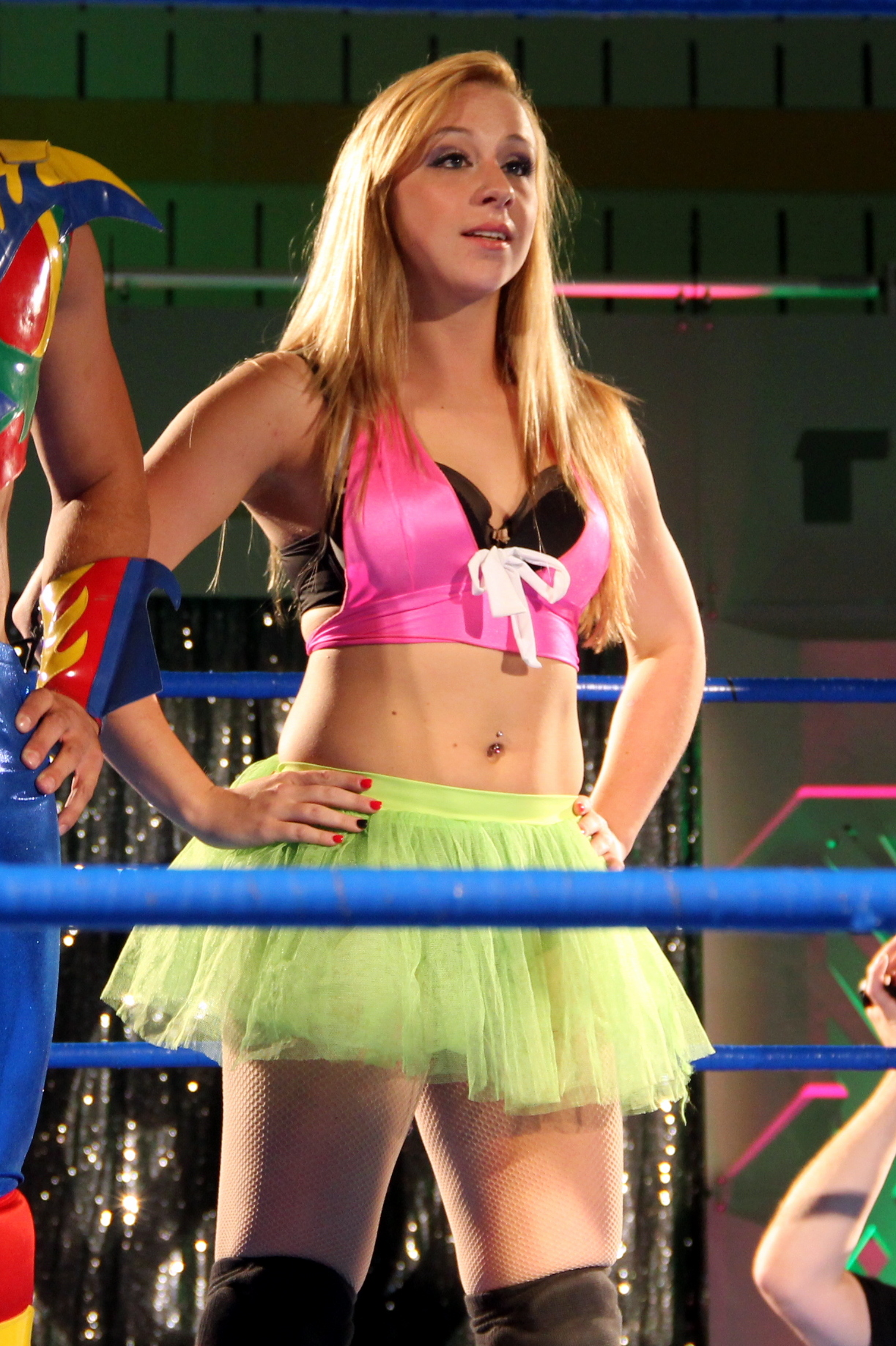
Lee in September 2014

Lee made her Chikara debut at King of Trios 2014: Night 1 in September 2014 as Princess KimberLee. She had previously made several appearances in Chikara's "Wrestling Is" sister promotions in 2013 and into 2014, both as a wrestler and temporarily as a valet for "Knight Eye for the Pirate Guy", the team of Jolly Roger & Lance Steel, with whom she would eventually team at the King of Trios tournament, losing in the first round to Gekido. She later wrestled her first Chikara singles match, against Missile Assault Ant, in a losing effort.

In 2015, Lee was named one of the ten team captains for the "Challenge of the Immortals" double round-robin tournament and drafted Jervis Cottonbelly and Los Ice Creams to her team. Initially spending multiple months without a win, they started picking up wins mid-way through the tournament, and when points-leader "Dasher's Dugout" had to forfeit their points, KimberLee's "Crown and Court" team was in the finals. On December 5, 2015, at the season finale Top Banana, "Crown & Court" won the Challenge of the Immortals tournament, defeating "Wrecking Crew". Later in the night, she then cashed in her "Golden Opportunity" after the main event, going on to defeat Hallowicked to win the Chikara Grand Championship. With the win, she became the first female wrestler to hold the top title in a major non-female promotion. She lost the title back to Hallowicked on May 30, 2016.

Lee made her return to Chikara after leaving WWE. She performed with The Whisper as a Tag Team, winning La Loteria Letal in 2018. On December 8, 2018, Kimber Lee and The Whisper won the Chikara Campeonatos de Parejas.

=== WWE (2016–2018) ===
On the December 7, 2016 episode of NXT, Lee lost to Ember Moon. Later that month, it was reported that she had signed with WWE and would start with the company in January 2017. Using her real name, on January 14, she competed in a tag team match with Dori Prange losing to Aliyah and Liv Morgan. On the May 3 episode of NXT, Frankele participated in a number one contender's battle royal for Asuka's NXT Women's Championship, where she was eliminated by Ruby Riott. In June, Frankele was given the new ring name Abbey Laith.

On June 22, Laith was announced as one of the 32 participants competing in the Mae Young Classic. She defeated Jazzy Gabert and Rachel Evers en route to the quarterfinals, where she was eliminated by Mercedes Martinez on September 4. On the October 25 episode of NXT, Laith participated in a battle royal to gain a spot at the fatal four-way match for the vacant NXT Women's Championship at NXT TakeOver: WarGames, but was unsuccessful. In March 2018, WWE released Frankele from her contract.

=== World Wonder Ring Stardom (2018) ===
In August 2018, Lee made her debut for the World Wonder Ring Stardom promotion by entering the 2018 5 Star Grand Prix. During the tournament, Lee scored six points in her block, however, it was not enough to advance to the finals.

=== Impact Wrestling (2020–2022) ===
Lee made her Impact Wrestling debut on the May 5, 2020 episode of Impact! during Madison Rayne's "Locker Room Talk" segment where she confronted Havok. The following week, Lee defeated Havok in her debut match by knocking her out with brass knuckles, establishing herself as a heel. At Slammiversary, she competed in a Gauntlet for the Gold match to determine the number one contender for the Knockouts Championship, which was won by Kylie Rae. On August 4, Lee officially signed with the company. On September 1, she aligned herself with the Knockouts Champion Deonna Purrazzo.

On the January 19, 2021 episode of Impact!, Lee teamed with Susan in a Knockouts tag team match against Jordynne Grace and Jazz, with Susan pinning the latter after a distraction from Knockouts Champion Deonna Purrazzo. At No Surrender, she teamed with Susan and Purrazzo for a six-Knockout tag team match against Grace, Jazz and ODB, with the latter making Susan submit and lose for her team. On the February 23 episode of Impact!, Lee and Susan lost to Grace and Jazz in a number one contenders match for the Knockouts Tag Team Championship. On April 25, she teamed with Susan and fought Rosemary and Havok in a losing effort on the Rebellion pre-show. On May 15, at Under Siege, Lee and Susan lost a tag team bout against Tenille Dashwood and Taylor Wilde. On June 12, at Against All Odds, she and Susan fought against Fire 'N Flava (Kiera Hogan and Tasha Steelz) for the Knockouts Tag Team Championship in a losing effort. Five days later, she and Susan were told by Purrazzo that they were no longer needed at her side.

After losing against Rosemary and Havok on the July 8 episode of Impact!, Lee took Susan to see Father James Mitchell in order to change her back to Su Yung, but on the following week, she revealed that she knew about her and drags Lee into a room before slamming the door. On the July 29 episode of Impact!, Yung returned and revealed a transformed Lee under her control. The following weeks saw both her and Yung confront Brandi Lauren and convert her into an undead zombie. On October 9, at Knockouts Knockdown, she competed in the Shannon "Daffney" Spruill Memorial Monster's Ball match, which was won by Savannah Evans. On the December 30 episode of Impact!, Lee and Lauren were dismissed as a result of Su Yung's legitimate pregnancy. It was then reported by PWInsider that both had left the company, though Lee denied this. In early 2022, her profile was removed from Impact's official website, signaling the end of her run with the company.

On May 6, 2023, Frankele announced her retirement from wrestling.

== Personal life ==
Frankele graduated from the University of the Arts in Philadelphia, Pennsylvania in 2013, with a fine arts degree in dance. Since 2018, she has been in a relationship with fellow professional wrestler, Zachary Green. On August 20, 2019, the couple confirmed their engagement, and married the following year, in May 2020. They separated in 2022 following allegations that Green had domestically assaulted Frankele over a period of time.

In April 2019, Frankele admitted that she had battled alcoholism but had been sober for two months. In August 2023, it was announced Frankele was facing charges of driving under the influence, resisting arrest and battery on a law enforcement officer stemming from her arrest in May in Sebring, Florida.

Frankele has been a vegan since February 2018, and has publicly advocated for veganism throughout her social media.

== Championships and accomplishments ==
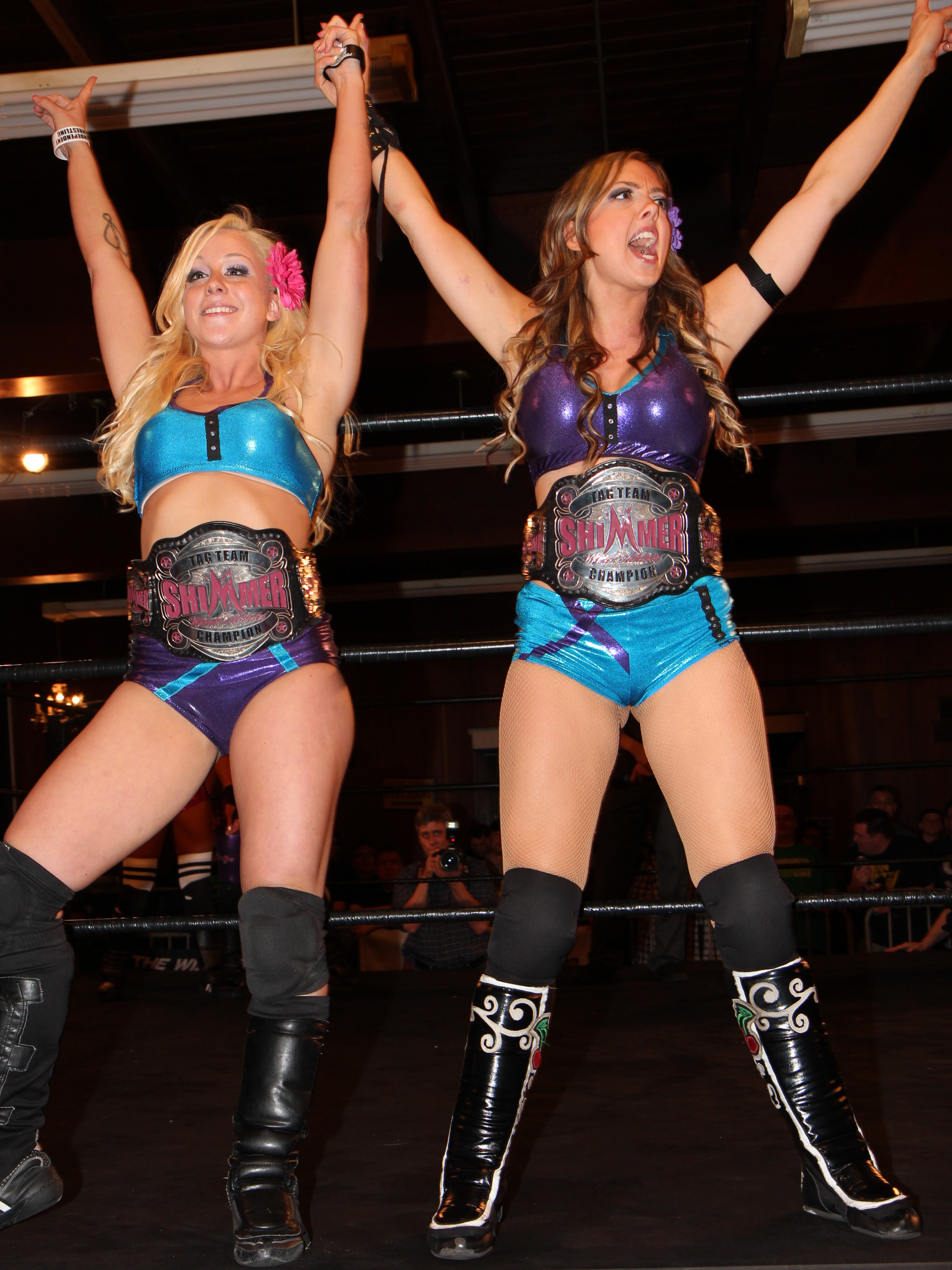
Alongside Cherry Bomb, Kimber Lee captured the Shimmer Tag Team Championship in 2015

- AAW: Professional Wrestling Redefined
  - AAW Women's Championship (1 time)
- Beyond Wrestling
  - Tournament for Today Women (2016)
- Chikara
  - Chikara Campeonatos de Parejas (1 time) – with The Whisper
  - Chikara Grand Championship (1 time)
  - Challenge of the Immortals (2015) – with El Hijo del Ice Cream, Ice Cream Jr. and Jervis Cottonbelly
  - King of Trios (2019) - with Ophidian and Lance Steel
  - La Lotería Letal (2018) – with The Whisper
- Dynamite Championship Wrestling
  - DCW Women's Championship (1 time)
- Jersey All Pro Wrestling
  - JAPW Women's Championship (1 time)
- Legacy Wrestling
  - Legacy Wrestling Women's Championship (1 time)
- Maryland Championship Wrestling
  - MCW Women's Championship (1 time)
- Pro Wrestling Illustrated
  - Ranked No. 15 of the top 100 female wrestlers in the PWI Women's 100 in 2020
- Shimmer Women Athletes
  - Shimmer Championship (1 time)
  - Shimmer Tag Team Championship (1 time) – with Cherry Bomb
- Shine Wrestling
  - Shine Tag Team Championship (2 times) – with Cherry Bomb (1) and Stormie Lee (1)
- Women Superstars Uncensored
  - WSU Tag Team Championship (2 times) – with Annie Social
- Without A Cause
  - Verified Championship (1 time)
