= Shimmer Championship =

Professional wrestling women's championship

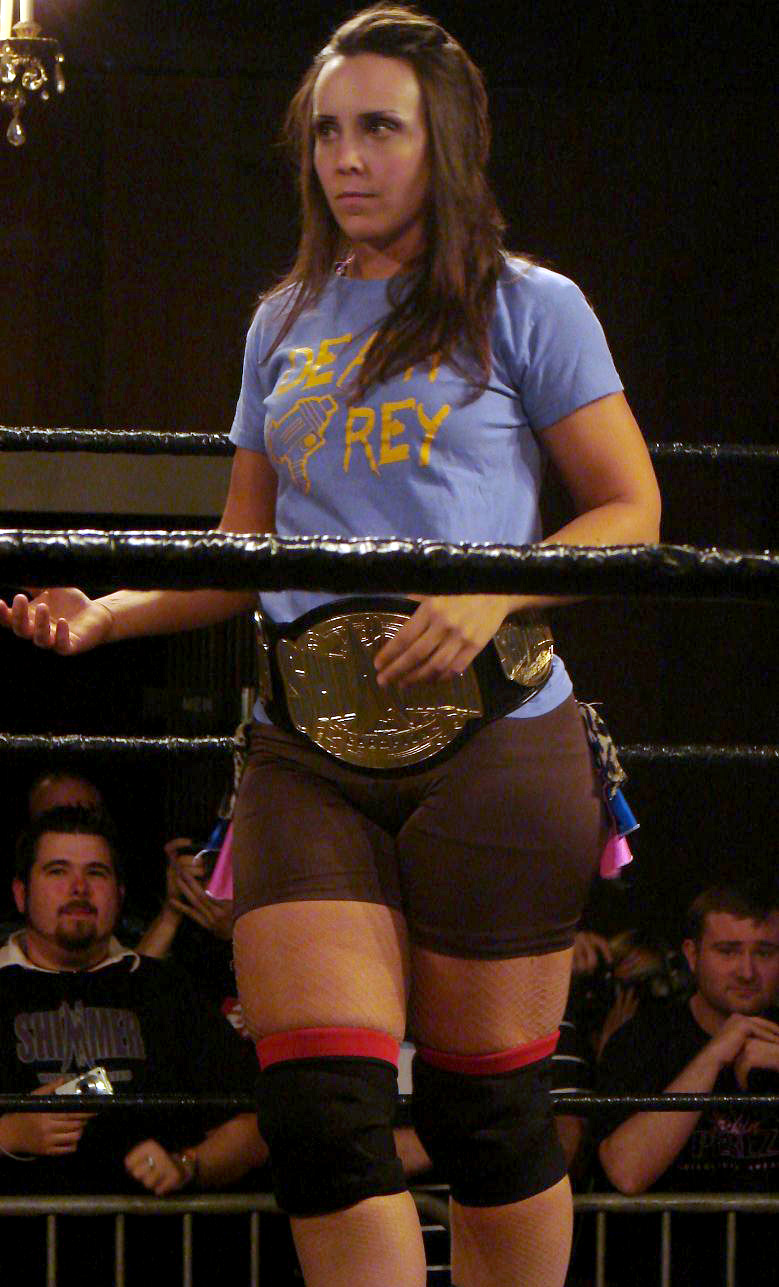
- Sara Del Ray won a tournament to become the inaugural SHIMMER champion.

Details
- Promotion: Shimmer Women Athletes
- Date established: June 1, 2007
- Date retired: November 1, 2021
Statistics
- First champion: Sara Del Rey
- Final champion: Zoey Skye
- Most reigns: Cheerleader Melissa, Madison Eagles and Mercedes Martinez (2 reigns)
- Longest reign: Kimber Lee (728 days)
- Shortest reign: Kellie Skater and Zoey Skye (1 day)
- Heaviest champion: Sara Del Rey; 160 lb (73 kg)
- Lightest champion: Saraya Knight; 126 lb (57 kg)

The Shimmer Championship was a women's professional wrestling championship in Shimmer Women Athletes, and has also been defended on shows of sister promotions Ring of Honor and Full Impact Pro. Championship reigns are determined by professional wrestling matches, in which competitors are involved in scripted rivalries. These narratives create feuds between the various competitors, which cast them as villains and heroines.

== History ==
Shimmer was founded by Dave Prazak and Allison Danger in 2005. Originally, the wrestlers had matches for competition or personal rivalries, with no prize on the line. After nearly two years, a championship for the promotion was launched. The title was created on June 1, 2007, and it was put on the line during a two-night, single-elimination tournament in Berwyn, IL. In the finals Sara Del Rey defeated Lacey to become the first champion.

== Inaugural championship tournament (2007) ==
The tournament was held over two nights on June 1, 2007, and June 2, 2007, at the Eagles Club in Berwyn, Illinois. The first two rounds were held on the first night, with the semis and final held on the second. The first and second rounds were filmed for release on Volume 11, while the semi-finals and finals were filmed the next night for Volume 12.

The tournament brackets were:

First Round
MsChif	Pin
Lexie Fyfe	8:23
Cheerleader Melissa	8:25
Sarah Stock	Pin
Sara Del Rey	Pin
Cindy Rogers	10:45
Ariel	6:15
Alicia^{1}	Pin
Allison Danger	9:21
Malia Hosaka	Pin
Daizee Haze	Pin
Portia Perez	5:46
Lacey	Pin
Eden Black	10:57
Nikki Roxx	Pin
Rain	8:09

Quarterfinals
MsChif	9:12
Sarah Stock	Pin
Sara Del Rey	Pin
Alicia	9:00
Malia Hosaka	9:01
Daizee Haze	Pin
Lacey	Pin
Nikki Roxx	16:21

Semifinals
Sarah Stock	19:51
Sara Del Rey	Pin
Daizee Haze	14:05
Lacey	Pin

Final
Sara Del Rey	Pin
Lacey	19:33

^{1}: Alicia substituted for Serena Deeb, who was unable to make it to the building in time for her match due to a car accident.

== Reigns ==
Key
No.	Overall reign number
Reign	Reign number for the specific champion
Days	Number of days held
Defenses	Number of successful defenses
+	Current reign is changing daily

No.	Champion	Championship change			Reign statistics			Notes	Ref.
No.	Champion	Date	Event	Location	Reign	Days	Defenses	Notes	Ref.
Shimmer Women Athletes and Ring of Honor (ROH)
1	Sara Del Rey	June 2, 2007	Volume 12	Berwyn, IL	1	329	5	Sara Del Rey defeated Lacey in the finals of a sixteen-woman tournament to become the inaugural champion.	
2	MsChif	April 26, 2008	Volume 18	Berwyn, IL	1	715	15		
3	Madison Eagles	April 11, 2010	Volume 31	Berwyn, IL	1	539	10		
4	Cheerleader Melissa	October 2, 2011	Volume 44	Berwyn, IL	1	168	3		
5	Saraya Knight	March 18, 2012	Volume 48	Berwyn, IL	1	384	7		
6	Cheerleader Melissa	April 6, 2013	Volume 53	Secaucus, NJ	2	560	10	This was a steel cage match.	
7	Nicole Matthews	October 18, 2014	Volume 68	Berwyn, IL	1	357	8	This was a four-way elimination match, also involving Athena and Madison Eagles. Matthews won the championship with lastly eliminating Eagles. During year 2014 the company stopped partnering with Ring of Honor alongside the title no longer being defended or featured in Ring of Honor.	
Shimmer Women Athletes
8	Madison Eagles	October 10, 2015	Volume 77	Berwyn, IL	2	260	7	This was a No Disqualification match.	
9	Mercedes Martinez	June 26, 2016	Volume 85	Berwyn, IL	1	139	0		
10	Kellie Skater	November 12, 2016	Volume 87	Chicago, IL	1	1	2		
11	Mercedes Martinez	November 13, 2016	Volume 90	Berwyn, IL	2	364	9		
12	Nicole Savoy	November 12, 2017	Volume 99	Berwyn, IL	1	721	17		
13	Kimber Lee	November 3, 2019	Volume 116	Berwyn, IL	1	728	3	This was a four-way elimination match, also involving Priscilla Kelly and Shotzi Blackheart.	
14	Zoey Skye	October 31, 2021	Volume 120	Berwyn, IL	1	1	0		
—	Deactivated	November 1, 2021	—	—	—	—	—	On November 1, 2021, this title became deactivated.	

== Combined reigns ==
As of December 21, 2025

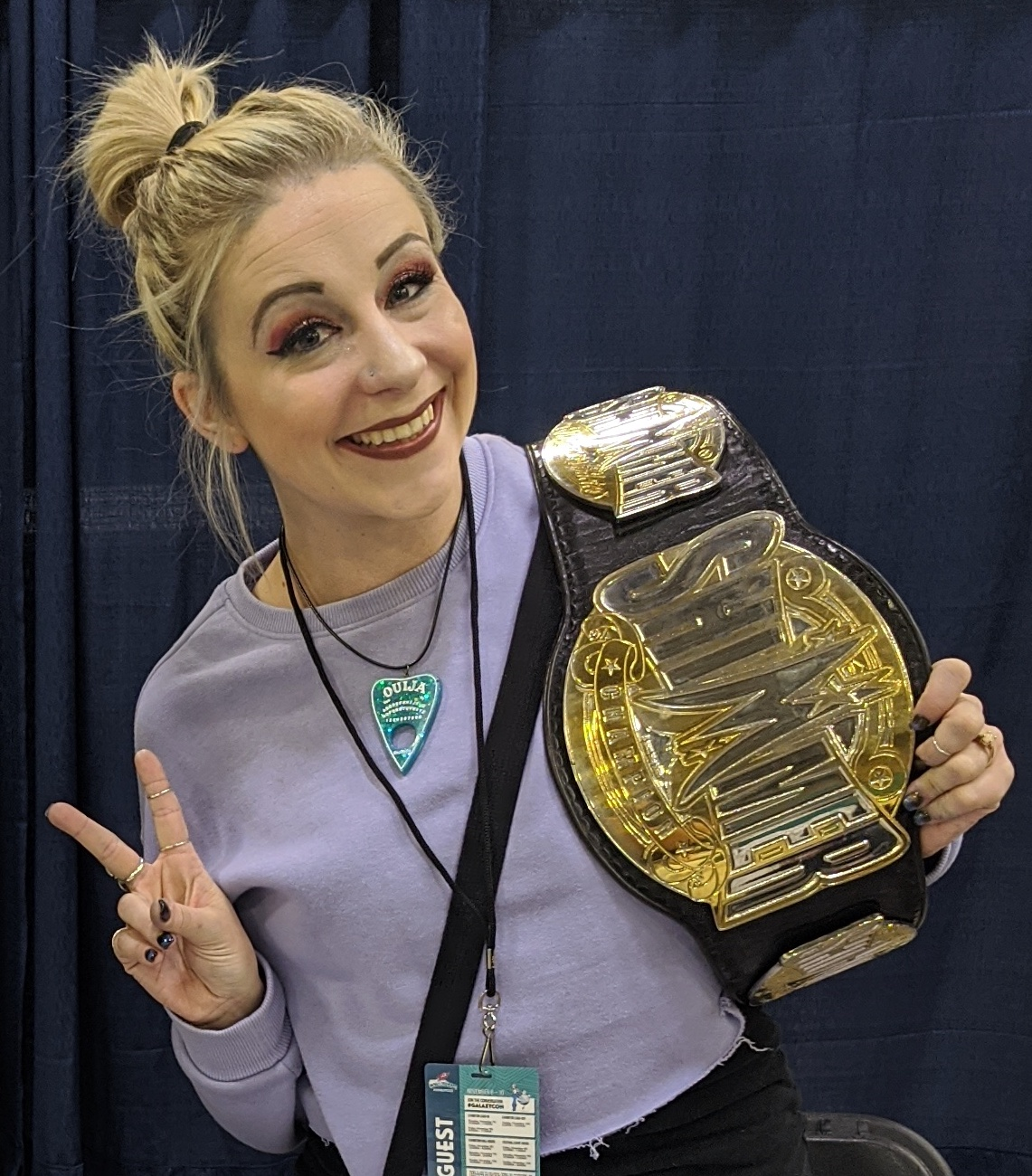
Kimber Lee had the longest time as champion in a single reign.

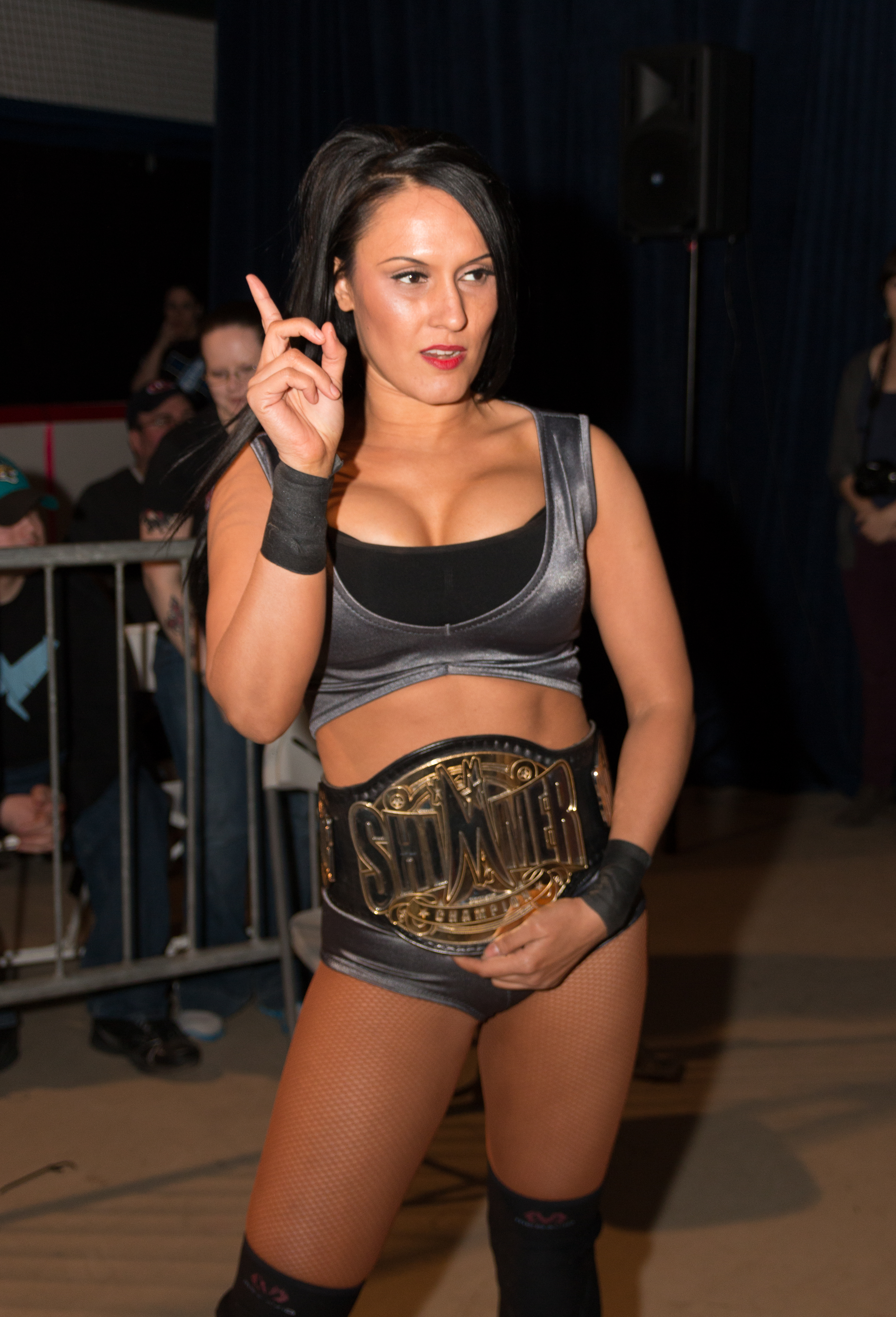
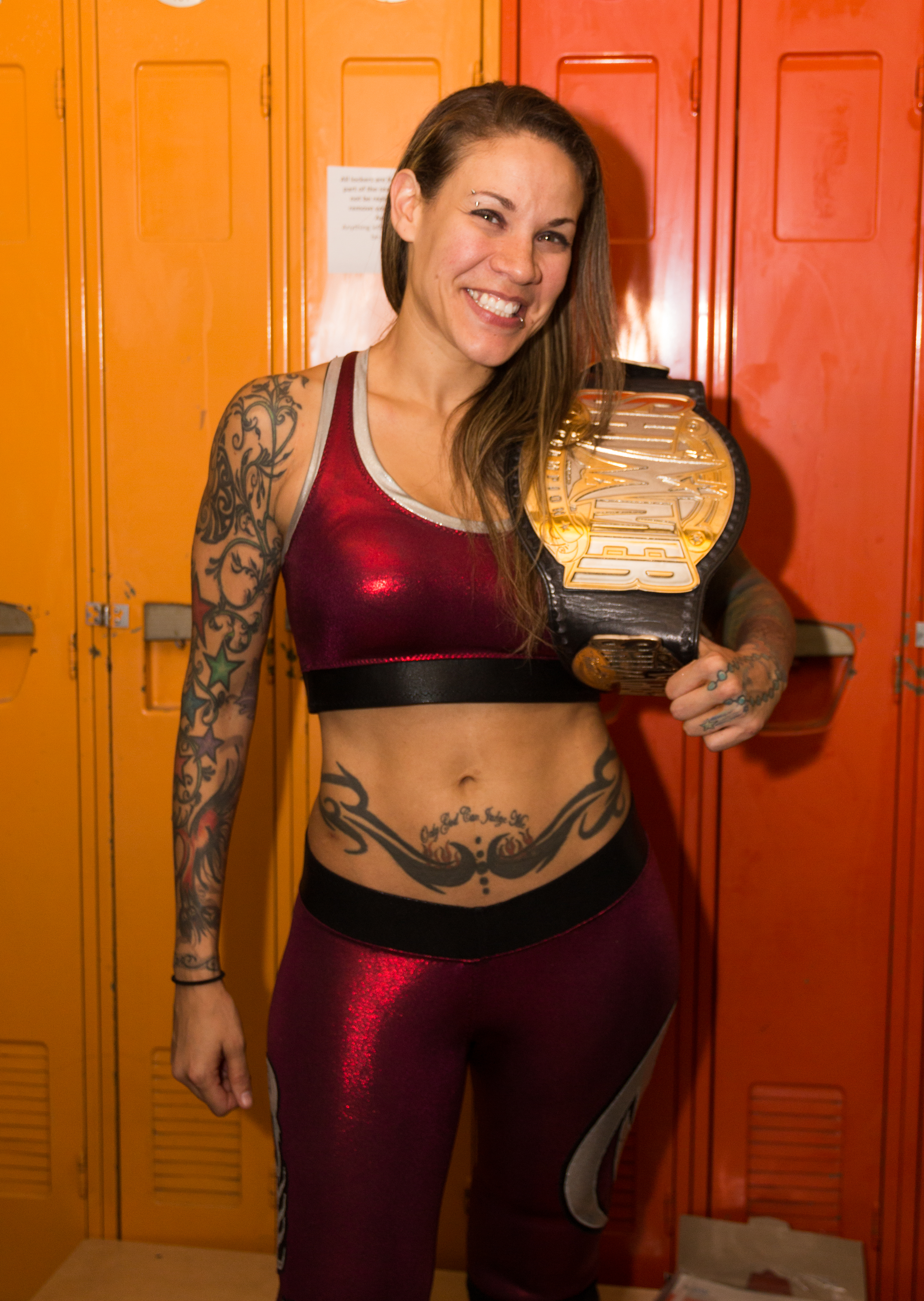
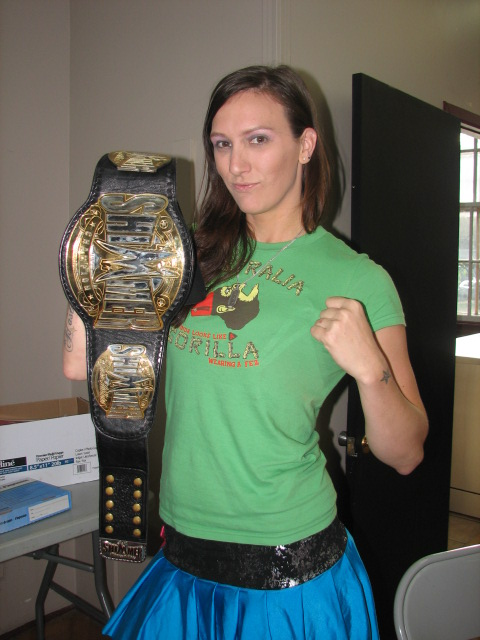
With 2 reigns each to their names, Cheerleader Melissa, Mercedes Martinez and Madison Eagles are tied for most reigns as SHIMMER champion. Eagles had the longest combined time as champion.

†	Indicates the current champion

Rank	Wrestler	No. of reigns	Combined defenses	Combined days
1	Madison Eagles	2	10	799
2	Cheerleader Melissa	2	13	728
3	Kimber Lee	1	3	728
4	Nicole Savoy	1	17	721
5	Mschif	1	15	715
6	Mercedes Martinez	2	9	503
7	Saraya Knight	1	7	384
8	Nicole Matthews	1	8	357
9	Sara Del Rey	1	5	329
10	Kellie Skater	1	2	1
11	Zoey Skye	1	0	1
