= List of Femmes Fatales events =

Femmes Fatales is an independent professional wrestling promotion based in Montreal, Quebec, Canada.

== NCW Femmes Fatales ==
NCW Femmes Fatales
- Promotion: NCW Femmes Fatales
- Date: September 5, 2009
- City: Montreal, Quebec, Canada
- Venue: Centre St-Barthélemy

No.	Results	Stipulations
1^{D}	Anastasia Ivy defeated CandyGirl	Singles match
2	Addy Starr defeated She Nay Nay	Singles match
3	Portia Perez defeated Kylie Pierce	Singles match
4	Kalamity defeated Anna Minoushka, Mary Lee Rose and Roxie Cotton	Four-way match
5	Sara Del Rey defeated Cherry Bomb	Singles match
6	Kacey Diamond defeated Karen Brooks	Singles match
7	MsChif (c) defeated Misty Haven	Singles match for the Shimmer Championship
8	LuFisto defeated Cheerleader Melissa	Singles match
(c) / – the champion(s) heading into the match; D / – this was a dark match

== NCW Femmes Fatales II ==
NCW Femmes Fatales II
- Promotion: NCW Femmes Fatales
- Date: February 6, 2010
- City: Montreal, Quebec, Canada
- Venue: Centre St-Barthélemy

No.	Results	Stipulations
1^{D}	Sabrina Kyle defeated Evilyn Fox	Singles match
2^{D}	Eve defeated Kira	Singles match
3	She Nay Nay defeated Karen Brooks	Singles match
4	Anne Minoushka and Anastasia Ivy defeated PJ Tyler and Mary Lee Rose	Tag team match
5	Cherry Bomb defeated Mistress Belmont	Singles match
6	Cat Power defeated LuFisto by disqualification	Singles match
7	Kacey Diamond defeated Midianne	Singles match
8	Mercedes Martinez defeated Portia Perez	Singles match
9	Cheerleader Melissa vs. Kalamity ended in no contest	Singles match
10	LuFisto and Cheerleader Melissa defeated Cat Power and Kalamity	No Disqualification tag team match
D / – this was a dark match

== NCW Femmes Fatales III ==
NCW Femmes Fatales III
- Promotion: NCW Femmes Fatales
- Date: June 5, 2010
- City: Montreal, Quebec, Canada
- Venue: Centre St-Barthélemy

No.	Results	Stipulations
1^{D}	Angie Skye defeated Missy	Singles match
2^{D}	Kira and Moonlight defeated Segolene and Eve	Tag team match
3	Portia Perez (with Nicole Matthews) defeated P.J. Tyler	NCW International Femmes Fatales Championship tournament first round match
4	Anna Minoushka defeated Sabrina Kyle	Singles match
5	Karen Brooks and Xandra Bale defeated Anastasia Ivy and Evilyn Fox	Tag team match
6	Kalamity defeated Sweet Cherrie	NCW International Femmes Fatales Championship tournament first round match
7	Cheerleader Melissa defeated Nicole Matthews (with Portia Perez)	NCW International Femmes Fatales Championship tournament first round match
8	Daffney defeated Mary Lee Rose	Singles match
9	Cat Power defeated Mistress Belmont	Singles match
10	LuFisto defeated Sara Del Rey	NCW International Femmes Fatales Championship tournament first round match
D / – this was a dark match

== NCW Femmes Fatales IV ==
NCW Femmes Fatales IV
- Promotion: NCW Femmes Fatales
- Date: October 23, 2010
- City: Montreal, Quebec, Canada
- Venue: Centre St-Barthélemy

No.	Results	Stipulations
1^{D}	Angie and Sherbrooke Connexion defeated Eve, Missy and Sengolene	Handicap tag team match
2^{D}	Moonlight defeated Xandra Bale	Singles match
3	LuFisto defeated Kalamity	NCW International Femmes Fatales Championship tournament semi-final round match
4	Portia Perez (with Nicole Matthews) defeated Cheerleader Melissa	NCW International Femmes Fatales Championship tournament semi-final round match
5	Mistress Belmont defeated She Nay Nay	Singles match
6	Mary Lee Rose and Karen Brooks defeated Anastasia Ivy and Roxie Cotton (with Evilyn Fox)	Tag team match
7	Mercedes Martinez defeated Nicole Matthews (with Portia Perez)	Singles match
8	La Parfaite Caroline defeated Sweet Cherrie	Singles match
9	PJ Tyler defeated Cat Power and Sassy Stephie	Three-way match
10	Amazing Kong defeated Anna Minoushka	Singles match
11	LuFisto defeated Portia Perez (with Nicole Matthews)	No Disqualification tournament final for the inaugural NCW International Femmes Fatales Championship
D / – this was a dark match

== NCW Femmes Fatales V ==
NCW Femmes Fatales V
- Promotion: NCW Femmes Fatales
- Date: March 12, 2011
- City: Montreal, Quebec, Canada
- Venue: Centre St-Barthélemy

No.	Results	Stipulations
1^{D}	Angie Skye defeated Xandra Bale	Singles match
2^{D}	The Sherbrooke Connection (Kira and Loue) defeated Missy and Xorphia Vexx	Tag team match
3	Sweet Cherrie defeated Kellie Skater	Singles match
4	Allison Danger defeated Anastasia Ivy by submission	Singles match
5	La Parfaite Caroline defeated Karen Brooks	Singles match
6	Cheerleader Melissa defeated Mary Lee Rose and She Nay Nay	Three-way match
7	Courtney Rush defeated Cat Power	Street Fight
8	Anna Minoushka defeated Mistress Belmont	Singles match
9	Mercedes Martinez defeated Kalamity	Singles match
10	LuFisto (c) defeated Hamada	Singles match for the NCW International Femmes Fatales Championship
(c) / – the champion(s) heading into the match; D / – this was a dark match

== NCW Femmes Fatales VI ==
NCW Femmes Fatales VI
- Promotion: NCW Femmes Fatales
- Date: June 4, 2011
- City: Montreal, Quebec, Canada
- Venue: Centre St-Barthélemy

No.	Results	Stipulations
1	Missy defeated Xandra Bale	Singles match
2	Anna Minoushka defeated Sweet Cherrie	Singles match
3	The Sherbrooke Connection (Kira and Loue) defeated Anastasia Ivy and Angie Skye	Tag team match
4	Brittney Savage defeated Cherry Bomb	Singles match
5	LuFisto (c) defeated La Parfaite Caroline	Singles match for the NCW International Femmes Fatales Championship
6	Mistress Belmont defeated Mary Lee Rose by disqualification	Singles match
7	Madison Eagles (c) defeated Courtney Rush	Singles match for the Shimmer Championship
8	Cheerleader Melissa and Mercedes Martinez defeated Portia Perez and Kalamity	Tag team match
(c) / – the champion(s) heading into the match

== NCW Femmes Fatales VII ==
NCW Femmes Fatales VII
- Promotion: NCW Femmes Fatales
- Date: October 8, 2011
- City: Montreal, Quebec, Canada
- Venue: Centre St-Barthélemy

No.	Results	Stipulations	Times
1	Angie Skye defeated Cherry Bomb	Singles match	5:20
2	The Sherbrooke Connection (Kira and Loue) defeated Anna Minoushka and Missy	Tag team match	6:58
3	She Nay Nay defeated Xandra Bale by submission	Singles match	7:12
4	Mercedes Martinez defeated Tiana Ringer	Singles match	9:12
5	Cheerleader Melissa defeated Yumi Ohka	Singles match	15:08
6	Courtney Rush defeated Kellie Skater	Singles match	10:03
7	Tomoka Nakagawa defeated Portia Perez and Sweet Cherrie	Three-way match	9:21
8	Kalamity defeated LuFisto (c)	Singles match for the NCW International Femmes Fatales Championship	17:17
(c) / – the champion(s) heading into the match

== NCW Femmes Fatales VIII ==
NCW Femmes Fatales VII
- Promotion: NCW Femmes Fatales
- Date: March 10, 2012
- City: Montreal, Quebec, Canada
- Venue: Centre St-Barthélemy

No.	Results	Stipulations	Times
1^{D}	Missy defeated Anna Minoushka, Mary Lee Rose and Milou	Four-way elimination match	—
2	Sweet Cherrie defeated Portia Perez	Singles match	—
3	Kellie Skater defeated Pink Flash Kira	Singles match	—
4	She Nay Nay defeated Rhia O'Reilly by submission	Singles match	—
5	Cheerleader Melissa vs. Hailey Hatred ended in a time limit draw	Singles match	25:00
6	Jessie McKay defeated Angie Skye	Singles match	—
7	LuFisto defeated Jazz	No Disqualification match	—
8	Kalamity (c) defeated Mercedes Martinez	Singles match for the NCW International Femmes Fatales Championship	—
(c) / – the champion(s) heading into the match; D / – this was a dark match

== NCW Femmes Fatales IX ==
NCW Femmes Fatales IX
- Promotion: NCW Femmes Fatales
- Date: July 7, 2012
- City: Montreal, Quebec, Canada
- Venue: Centre St-Barthélemy

No.	Results	Stipulations	Times
1^{D}	Serphantina defeated Mileena D-Bomb	Singles match	—
2	Angie Skye (with Kath Von Goth) defeated Leah Von Dutch	Singles match	4:57
3	Missy defeated Deziree	Singles match	3:22
4	Veda Scott defeated Mary Lee Rose (with Mademoiselle Rachelle)	Singles match	5:13
5	The Canadian NINJAs (Nicole Matthews and Portia Perez) defeated Cherry Bomb and Sweet Cherrie	Tag team match to determine the #1 contenders for the Shimmer Tag Team Championship	7:13
6	LuFisto vs. Mercedes Martinez ended in a double countout	Singles match	9:30
7	Kira defeated She Nay Nay	Singles match	6:12
8	The Canadian NINJAs (Nicole Matthews and Portia Perez) defeated Courtney Rush and Sara Del Rey (c)	Tag team match for the Shimmer Tag Team Championship	4:39
9	Cheerleader Melissa defeated K. C. Spinelli	Singles match	7:09
10	The Midwest Militia (Allysin Kay, Jessicka Havok and Sassy Stephie) (with Mademoiselle Rachelle) defeated The Rush Revolution (Cat Power, Courtney Rush and Xandra Bale) (with Mary Lee Rose)	Six-woman tag team match	11:02
11	Kalamity (c) defeated Sara Del Rey	Singles match for the NCW International Femmes Fatales Championship	12:19
(c) / – the champion(s) heading into the match; D / – this was a dark match

== NCW Femmes Fatales X ==
NCW Femmes Fatales X
- Promotion: NCW Femmes Fatales
- Date: November 3, 2012

Femmes Fatales X – part 1

No.	Results	Stipulations	Times
1^{D}	Serphentina defeated Jewells Malone	Singles match	—
2	Sweet Cherrie defeated Cherry Bomb	Singles match	6:02
3	Sassy Stephie defeated Mary Lee Rose	Singles match	8:38
4	She Nay Nay and Deziree defeated Missy and Medianne	Tag team match	7:59
5	LuFisto defeated Hiroyo Matsumoto	Singles match	10:53
6	Sweet Saraya defeated Cat Power	Singles match	6:32
7	Ryo Mizunami defeated Leah Von Dutch and Xandra Bale	Three-way match	8:34
8	Courtney Rush defeated Portia Perez	Singles match	6:40
9	Athena defeated Angie Skye, Cheerleader Melissa and X-Cute Sweet	Four-way match to determine the #1 contender for the NCW Femmes Fatales International Championship	12:05
10	Mercedes Martinez defeated Pink Flash Kira	Singles match	4:31
11	Kalamity (c) defeated Kellie Skater	Two-out-of-three falls match for the NCW Femmes Fatales International Championship	15:22
(c) / – the champion(s) heading into the match; D / – this was a dark match

Femmes Fatales X – part 2

No.	Results	Stipulations	Times
1	X-Cute Sweet defeated Sassy Stephie	Singles match	8:05
2	Pink Flash Kira defeated Portia Perez by countout	Singles match	6:15
3	Leah Von Dutch, Missy and Xandra Bale defeated Deziree, Medianne and She Nay Nay	Six-woman tag team match	6:58
4	Mary Lee Rose defeated Sweet Saraya by disqualification	Singles match	1:06
5	Sweet Cherrie defeated Sweet Saraya by disqualification	Singles match	0:40
6	Hiroyo Matsumoto defeated Cherry Bomb	Singles match	9:38
7	Kellie Skater defeated Cat Power	Singles match	8:37
8	Courtney Rush defeated Ryo Mizunami	Singles match	9:13
9	Cheerleader Melissa defeated Angie Skye	Singles match	7:09
10	Kalamity (c) defeated Athena	Singles match for the NCW Femmes Fatales International Championship	10:36
11	Mercedes Martinez defeated LuFisto	Steel cage match	19:30
(c) / – the champion(s) heading into the match

== NCW Femmes Fatales XI ==
NCW Femmes Fatales XI
- Promotion: NCW Femmes Fatales
- Date: March 30, 2013

No.	Results	Stipulations	Times
1	Sweet Cherie defeated Sassy Stephie (with Madamoiselle Rachelle)	Singles match	7:10
2	Kira defeated Jewells Malone	Singles match	8:23
3	Midianne (with Desiree) defeated Xandra Bale	Singles match	6:51
4	Kellie Skater defeated Angie Skye (with Kath Von Goth)	Singles match	8:19
5	Cheerleader Melissa defeated Allysin Kay	Singles match	13:45
6	Cherry Bomb defeated Mary Lee Rose	Singles match	7:07
7	Courtney Rush defeated Allison Danger (c)	Singles match for the Bellatrix World Championship	15:53
8	Saraya Knight (c) defeated LuFisto	No Disqualification match for the Shimmer Championship	19:55
9	Mercedes Martinez defeated Kalamity (c)	Singles match for the NCW International Femmes Fatales Championship	13:55
(c) / – the champion(s) heading into the match

== NCW Femmes Fatales XII ==
NCW Femmes Fatales XII
- Promotion: NCW Femmes Fatales
- Date: July 6, 2013

No.	Results	Stipulations
1^{D}	Jody Milo defeated Diane Hall	Singles match
2	LuFisto defeated Kimber Lee	Singles match
3	Pink Flash Kira defeated Portia Perez by countout	Singles match
4	She Nay Nay defeated Veda Scott by submission	Singles match
5	Deziree and Midianne defeated Leah Von Dutch and Xandra Bale	Tag team match
6	Cheerleader Melissa vs. Courtney Rush ended in a double disqualification	Singles match
7	Sassy Stephie defeated Missy	Singles match
8	Christina Von Eerie defeated Angie Skye by submission	Singles match
9	Mercedes Martinez (c) defeated Sweet Cherrie	NCW International Femmes Fatales Championship
(c) / – the champion(s) heading into the match; D / – this was a dark match

== NCW Femmes Fatales XIII ==
NCW Femmes Fatales XIII
- Promotion: NCW Femmes Fatales
- Date: October 26, 2013

No.	Results	Stipulations
1^{P}	Diana Hall defeated Zoey	Singles match
2	Leah Von Dutch and Kaitlin Diemond defeated Bettie Rage and Midianne	Two-out-of-three falls match
3	Missy defeated Niya Barela	Singles match
4	Pink Flash Kira defeated Portia Perez by submission	Lumberjack Strap match
5	Mary Lee Rose defeated Jody D'Milo by disqualification	Singles match
6	Angie Skye defeated Christina Von Eerie and Kimber Lee	Triple Threat match
7	Sweet Cherrie and LuFisto defeated Cheerleader Melissa and Mercedes Martinez	No disqualification tag team match
P / – the match was broadcast on the pre-show

== NCW Femmes Fatales XIV ==
NCW Femmes Fatales XIV
- Promotion: NCW Femmes Fatales
- Date: April 19, 2014
- City: Montreal, Quebec
- Venue: Centre LGH

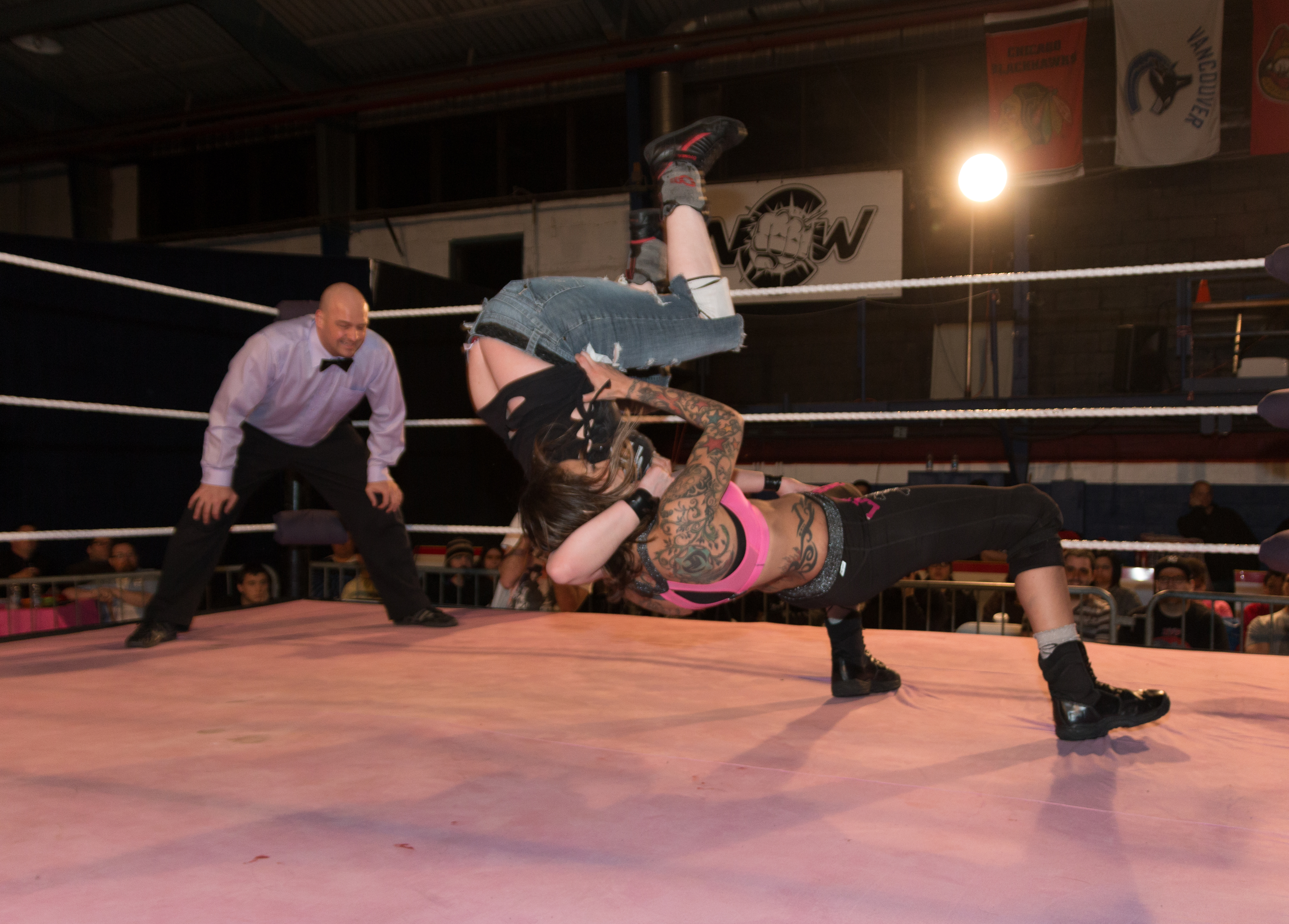
Mercedes Martinez executing a snap suplex on Missy during Femme Fatales XIV.

No.	Results	Stipulations
1^{D}	Bettie Rage defeated Diana Hall	Singles match
2	Angie Skye defeated Cat Power	Singles match
3	Kaitlin Diemond defeated Jasmin	Singles match
4	Mary Lee Rose, Pink Flash Kira and Vanessa Kraven defeated Sassy Stephie, Anna Minoushka and Jody D'Milo (with Mademoiselle Rachelle)	Six-woman tag team match
5	Sweet Cherrie defeated Saraya Knight	Singles match under British Rules
6	Deziree defeated Mistress Belmont	Singles match
7	LuFisto defeated Nikki Storm	Singles match
8	Mercedes Martinez (c) defeated Missy, Angie Skye and Leah Von Dutch	Four-way elimination match for the NCW International Femmes Fatales Championship
9	Courtney Rush vs. Cheerleader Melissa ended in a time limit draw	30-Minute Iron Woman match
(c) / – the champion(s) heading into the match; D / – this was a dark match

== NCW Femmes Fatales XV ==
NCW Femmes Fatales XV
- Promotion: NCW Femmes Fatales
- Date: August 16, 2014
- City: Montreal, Quebec
- Venue: Centre LGH

No.	Results	Stipulations
1	Kimber Lee defeated Missy	Singles match
2	Mary Lee Rose and Pink Flash Kira defeated Addy Starr and Kaitlin Diemond	Tag team match
3	Vanessa Kraven defeated Sassy Stephie	Singles match
4	Portia Perez defeated Angie Skye, Diana Hall, Mistress Belmont, Veda Scott and Xandra Bale	Gauntlet match
5	Sweet Cherrie defeated K. C. Spinelli	Singles match
6	Courtney Rush defeated Mercedes Martinez (c), Cheerleader Melissa and LuFisto	Fatal four-way for the NCW Femmes Fatales Championship
(c) / – the champion(s) heading into the match

== NCW Femmes Fatales XVI ==
NCW Femmes Fatales XVI
- Promotion: NCW Femmes Fatales
- Date: October 25, 2014
- City: Montreal, Quebec
- Venue: Centre LGH

No.	Results	Stipulations
1	Kaitlin Diemond defeated Missy	Singles match
2	Kira and Mary Lee Rose defeated Bettie Rage and Dézirée	Tag team match
3	K. C. Spinelli defeated Allysin Kay and Xandra Bale	Triple Threat match
4	Saraya Knight defeated Sweet Cherrie	Singles match
5	Vanessa Kraven defeated Jody D'Milo by disqualification	Singles match
6	Jody D'Milo and Sassy Stephie defeated Angie Skye and Vanessa Kraven	Tag team match
7	LuFisto (c) defeated Mia Yim	Singles match for the WSU Championship
8	Courtney Rush (c) defeated Cheerleader Melissa	Singles match for the NCW Femmes Fatales Championship
(c) / – the champion(s) heading into the match

== NCW Femmes Fatales XVII ==
NCW Femmes Fatales XVII
- Promotion: NCW Femmes Fatales
- Date: April 4, 2015
- City: Montreal, Quebec
- Venue: Centre LGH

No.	Results	Stipulations
1	Missy defeated La Parfaite Caroline	Singles match
2	Jessika Black defeated Stacy Thibault	Singles match
3	Sweet Cherrie defeated Portia Perez and Sassy Stephie (with Mademoiselle Rachelle)	Triple Threat match
4	Kaitlin Diemond and Leah Von Dutch defeated Hania the Howling Huntress and Seleziya Sparx	Tag team match
5	Dézirée and Eve defeated Mary Lee Rose and Pink Flash Kira	Tag team match
6	Cheerleader Melissa defeated Vanessa Kraven	Singles match
7	LuFisto defeated Courtney Rush (c) and Saraya Knight	Triple Threat match for the NCW Femmes Fatales Championship
(c) / – the champion(s) heading into the match

== NCW Femmes Fatales XVIII ==
NCW Femmes Fatales XVIII
- Promotion: NCW Femmes Fatales
- Date: October 17, 2015
- City: Montreal, Quebec
- Venue: Centre LGH

No.	Results	Stipulations
1	Veda Scott defeated Sassy Stephie	Singles match
2	Sally defeated Atira and Kalina	Singles match
3	Vanessa Kraven defeated Stacy Thibault	Triple Threat match
4	La Parfaite Caroline defeated Angie Skye and Solo Darling	Triple Threat match
5	Stefany Sinclair defeated Kacey Diamond	Singles match
6	Stefany Sinclair defeated Bettie Rage, Kira, Mary Lee Rose, Stacy Thibault, Solo Darling, Vanessa Kraven, Veda Scott, Sally, Sassy Stephy, Angie Skye, Atira, Kacey Diamond and Azaelle	Battle Royal
7	Jessika Black (c) defeated Saraya Knight	Singles match for the NCW Femmes Fatales Championship
(c) / – the champion(s) heading into the match

== NCW Femmes Fatales XIX ==
NCW Femmes Fatales XIX
- Promotion: NCW Femmes Fatales
- Date: March 26, 2016
- City: Ste-Thérèse, Quebec
- Venue: Centre Culturel et Communautaire

No.	Results	Stipulations
1	Sally (with Kath Von Goth) defeated Midiane	Singles match
2	Vanessa Kraven defeated Sassy Stephie	Singles match
3	Jewells Malone defeated Eve	Singles match
4	Sally (with Kath Von Goth) defeated Vanessa Kraven and Jewells Malone	Triple Threat match
5	Kira and Mary Lee Rose defeated Balespin (K. C. Spinelli and Xandra Bale)	Tag team match
6	Sally (with Kath Von Goth) defeated Stefany Sinclair	Singles match for the NCW International Femmes Fatales Championship

== Femmes Fatales 20 ==
Femmes Fatales 20
- Promotion: Femmes Fatales
- Date: February 24, 2018
- City: Ottawa, Ontario, Canada
- Venue: Vanier Columbus Club
- Attendance: 460

No.	Results	Stipulations
1	Alexia Nicole defeated K. C. Spinelli	Singles match
2	Misty Haven and Stacy Thibault defeated Angie Skye and Kira	Tag team match
3	Xandra Bale defeated Stefany Sinclair	Singles match
4	Jessicka Havok defeated Samantha Heights	Singles match
5	Tessa Blanchard defeated Britt Baker	Singles match
6	Vanessa Kraven defeated Mercedes Martinez (c)	Singles match for the Femmes Fatales Championship
(c) / – the champion(s) heading into the match

== Femmes Fatales 21 ==
Femmes Fatales 21
- Promotion: Femmes Fatales
- Date: February 22, 2019
- City: Ottawa, Ontario, Canada
- Venue: St. Anthony's Banquet Hall

No.	Results	Stipulations
1	Alexia Nicole and Willow Nightingale defeated K. C. Spinelli and Veda Scott	Tag team match
2	Samantha Heights defeated Nevaeh	Singles match
3	Jessicka Havok defeated Penelope Ford	Singles match
4	Mary Lee Rose defeated Angie Skye	Singles match
5	Nicole Savoy defeated Nicole Matthews	Singles match
6	Kris Statlander defeated Allysin Kay and Mercedes Martinez	Three-way match

== Femmes Fatales 22 ==
Femmes Fatales 22
- Promotion: Femmes Fatales
- Date: May 4, 2019
- City: Quebec, Canada
- Venue: Centre Horizon

No.	Results	Stipulations
1	Mary Lee Rose won the match (Note: The other participants were: Angie Skye, Azaelle, Bettie Rage, Meave O’Farrell, Melanie Havok, Melodie Girard, Pink Flash Kira, Sally and Stéfany Sinclair.)	Battle royal
2	Alexia Nicole defeated Ashley Vox	Singles match
3	Veda Scott defeated Davienne by submission	Singles match
4	Meave O’Farrell and Sally defeated Angie Skye and Mary Lee Rose	Tag team match
5	Kimber Lee defeated Priscilla Kelly	Singles match
6	Mercedes Martinez defeated Kris Statlander	Singles match for the vacant Femmes Fatales Championship
7	Lufisto defeated Cheerleader Melissa	Singles match

== Femmes Fatales 23 ==
Femmes Fatales 23
- Promotion: Femmes Fatales
- Date: February 21, 2020
- City: Ottawa, Ontario, Canada
- Venue: St. Anthony's Banquet Hall

No.	Results	Stipulations
1	Meave O’Farrell defeated K. C. Spinelli	Singles match
2	Veda Scott defeated Ashley Vox and Neveah	Three-way match
3	LuFisto defeated Priscilla Kelly	No Disqualification match
4	Cecil Nyx and Sally defeated The Girls Room (Ava Everett and Davienne)	Tag team match
5	Kimber Lee defeated Ivelisse	Singles match
6	Alexia Nicole defeated Nicole Savoy	Singles match for the vacant Femmes Fatales Championship

== NSPW X Femmes Fatales: Snowstorm Edition ==
NSPW X Femmes Fatales: Snowstorm Edition
- Promotion(s): Femmes Fatales; North Shore Pro Wrestling (NSPW)
- Date: March 4, 2023
- City: Quebec City, Quebec, Canada
- Venue: Centre Horizon

No.	Results	Stipulations
1	La Parfaite Caroline defeated Emily Grimsky	Singles match
2	Azaelle and Mary Lee Rose defeated Dani Leo and Melanie Havok	Tag team match
3	Jody Threat defeated Zak Patterson	Singles match
4	Nicole Matthews defeated Liiza Hall	Best two-out-of-three falls match
5	Loue O'Farrell, Stu Grayson and Travis Toxic defeated James Stone, Pee Wee and Vanessa Kraven	Six-person tag team match

== Smash X Femmes Fatales Girls Next Door ==
Smash X Femmes Fatales Girls Next Door
- Promotion(s): Femmes Fatales; Smash Wrestling
- Date: June 25, 2023
- City: Toronto, Ontario, Canada
- Venue: Toronto Rec Room

No.	Results	Stipulations
1	Nikita (c) defeated Liiza Hall	Singles match for the Smash Women's Championship
2	Kristara and Miley defeated K. C. Spinelli and Mary Lee Rose	Tag team match
3	Trish Adora defeated Vanessa Kraven	Singles match
4	Nicole Matthews defeated Alexia Nicole (c)	Singles match for the Femmes Fatales Championship
5	Taylor Rising defeated Hailey Dylan	Singles match for the Femmes Fatales Championship
6	Mercedes Martinez defeated Vert Vixen (c) by disqualification	Singles match for the Defy Women's Championship
7	Jody Threat defeated Allie Katch	Singles match
(c) / – the champion(s) heading into the match

== See also ==
- Shimmer Volumes
- Shine Wrestling events
