= Sensational Sherri Memorial Cup Tournament =

Professional wrestling event

- Promotion: Association de Lutte Féminine
- Date: 2007-2008
- City: Montreal, Quebec, Canada
- Venue: Centre Sportif St-Barthélemy

The Sensational Sherri Memorial Cup Tournament was an annual professional wrestling memorial event produced by the Association de Lutte Féminine (ALF) promotion, which was held in 2007 and 2008. The first tournament took place on October 12, 2007, at the Centre Sportif St-Barthélemy in Montreal, Quebec. It was the first event under the Amazones et Titans chronology and first-ever mixed tag team tournament held in the promotion's history. The show was held in honor of American female professional wrestler and manager "Sensational" Sherri Martel who died of an accidental drug overdose at the home of her mother in McCalla, Alabama four months earlier. Eight professional wrestling matches were featured on the event's card, including a battle royal.

LuFisto and El Generico won the tournament by winning two matches at the one-night tournament, receiving a bye for the semi-finals. Over the course of the evening, they defeated Misty Haven and Michael Von Payton in the opening rounds, and Stefany Sinclair and Kevin Steen in the final match. Steen, upset by their loss, attempted to steal the trophy and give it to Stefany, but was convinced by Stefany to return it to the rightful winners of the tournament. In addition to the tournament, a 7-woman battle royal was held which saw Kalamity defeat six other participants by last eliminating Mary Lollypop. As a result of a pre-match stipulation, Kalamity was declared the number one contender for the AWF championship earning a match against then champion Stefany Sinclair the following month.

The second tournament was held at Montreal's Centre Sportif St-Barthélemy on November 14, 2008, and won by Misty Haven and Michael Von Payton. They defeated three teams to win the event; Charlotte Lamothe and Jimmy Stone in the opening rounds, Mary Lollypop and Nova Cain in the semi-finals, and Kacey Diamond and Marko Estrada in the finals. Also featured on the undercard was a singles match between Vanessa Kraven and She Nay Nay, which Kraven won, and a non-tournament tag team match which saw Charlotte Lamothe and Karen Brooks defeat Eve and Anna Minoushka.

== Show results ==
=== First Annual Sensational Sherri Memorial Cup Tournament ===
October 12, 2007 in Montreal, Quebec (Centre Sportif St-Barthélemy)

#	Results	Stipulations
1	Stefany Sinclair and Kevin Steen (with Rachelle and Anna Minoushka) defeated La Parfaite Caroline and Tank	First Round Tournament match
2	Vanessa Kraven and SeXXXy Eddy fought to a time-limit draw with Kacey Diamond and eXeSs	First Round Tournament match
3	21st Century Fox and Franky The Mobster defeated Charlotte Lamothe and Beef Wellington	First Round Tournament match
4	LuFisto and El Generico defeated Misty Haven and Michael Von Payton	First Round Tournament match
5	Stefany Sinclair and Kevin Steen defeated 21st Century Fox and Franky The Mobster	Semi Final Tournament match
6	LuFisto and El Generico received a bye.	Semi Final Tournament match
7	Kalamity (with James Kraven) defeated 6 other participants by last eliminating Mary Lollypop. (Note: The other participants included were: Anna Minoushka, Nikky (with Bellissima), Eve, Kelly Binder, and Sweet Krissy.)	Seven-woman battle royal; As a result of a pre-match stipulation, Kalamity became the number one contender for the AWF Championship.
8	LuFisto and El Generico defeated Stefany Sinclair and Kevin Steen	Tournament Finals match

==== Tournament brackets ====
This was a one-night tournament which took place on October 15, 2007. The tournament brackets were:

First Round
Stefany Sinclair and Kevin Steen	Sub
La Parfaite Caroline and Tank
21st Century Fox and Franky The Mobster	Pin
Charlotte Lamothe and Beef Wellington
LuFisto and El Generico	Pin
Misty Haven and Michael Von Payton
Vanessa Kraven and SeXXXy Eddy
Kacey Diamond and eXeSs	Draw

Semifinals
Stefany Sinclair and Kevin Steen	Pin
21st Century Fox and Franky The Mobster
LuFisto and El Generico
BYE

Final
Stefany Sinclair and Kevin Steen
LuFisto and El Generico	Pin

=== Second Annual Sensational Sherri Memorial Cup Tournament ===
November 14, 2008 in Montreal, Quebec (Centre Sportif St-Barthélemy)

#	Results	Stipulations	Times
1	Misty Haven and Michael Von Payton defeated Charlotte Lamothe and Jimmy Stone	First Round Tournament match	n/a
2	Mary Lollypop and Nova Cain defeated Portia Perez and Don Paysan	First Round Tournament match	n/a
3	21st Century Fox and Van Hawk defeated Karen Brooks and Stupefied	First Round Tournament match	n/a
4	Kacey Diamond and Marko Estrada defeated Kalamity and James Kraven	First Round Tournament match	n/a
5	Vanessa Kraven defeated She Nay Nay	Singles match	n/a
5	Misty Haven and Michael Von Payton defeated Mary Lollypop and Nova Cain	Semi Final Tournament match	n/a
6	Kacey Diamond and Marko Estrada defeated 21st Century Fox and Van Hawk	Semi Final Tournament match	n/a
7	Charlotte Lamothe and Karen Brooks defeated Eve and Anna Minoushka	Tag Team match	n/a
8	Misty Haven and Michael Von Payton defeated Kacey Diamond and Marko Estrada	Tournament Finals match	n/a

==== Tournament brackets ====
This was a one-night tournament which took place on November 14, 2008. The tournament brackets were:

First Round
Misty Haven and Michael Von Payton
Charlotte Lamothe and Jimmy Stone
Mary Lollypop and Nova Cain
Portia Perez and Don Paysan
21st Century Fox and Van Hawk
Karen Brooks and Stupefied
Kacey Diamond and Marko Estrada
Kalamity and James Kraven

Semifinals
Misty Haven and Michael Von Payton
Mary Lollypop and Nova Cain
21st Century Fox and Van Hawk
Kacey Diamond and Marko Estrada

Final
Misty Haven and Michael Von Payton
Kacey Diamond and Marko Estrada
