= Femmes Fatales Championship =

Professional wrestling women's championship

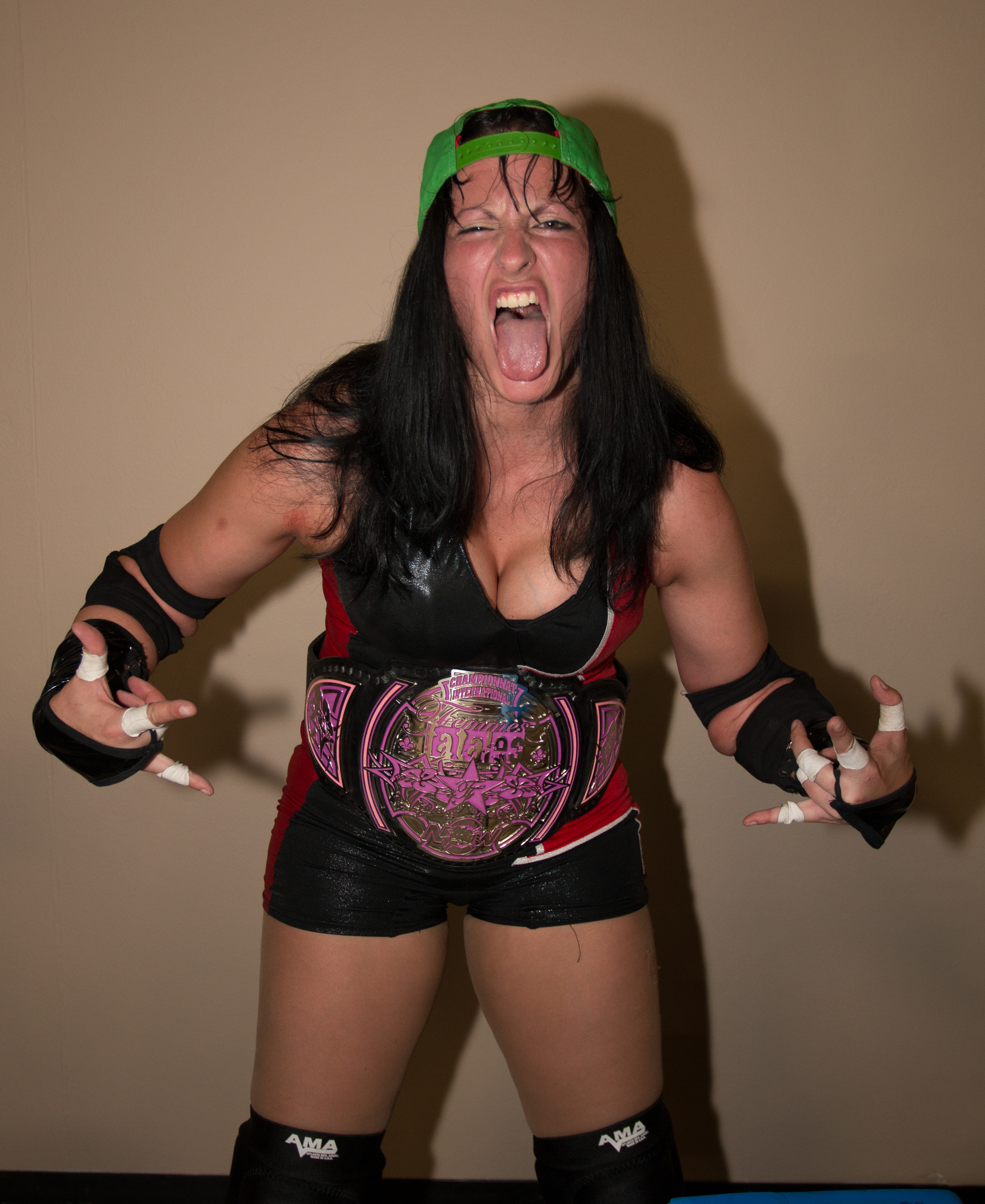
- Courtney Rush with the Femmes Fatales Championship belt.

Details
- Promotion: Femmes Fatales
- Date established: October 23, 2010
- Current champion: Nicole Matthews
- Date won: June 25, 2023

Other names
- nCw Femmes Fatales Championship (2010-2011); NCW International Femmes Fatales Championship (2011-2018); Femmes Fatales Championship (2018-present)
Statistics
- First champion: LuFisto
- Most reigns: Mercedes Martinez (3 reigns)
- Longest reign: Alexia Nicole (1,220 days)
- Shortest reign: Sally (21 days)

The Femmes Fatales Championship is a women's professional wrestling championship, owned by the Canadian promotion in Femmes Fatales. Championship reigns are determined by professional wrestling matches, in which competitors are involved in scripted rivalries. These narratives create feuds between the various competitors, which cast them as villains and heroines.

== Title history ==
On October 23, 2010, at NCW Femmes Fatales IV, LuFisto became the inaugural nCw Femmes Fatales Champion by defeating Portia Perez in the finals of an eight-woman single-elimination tournament, which was a No Disqualification match. Through October 8, 2011, during Kalamity's reign, the title was re-named to the NCW Femmes Fatales International Championship. On March 26, 2016, the championship was vacated after the previous champion Jessika Black suffered an injury. Sally would later win the after defeating Stefany Sinclair at the tournament finals.

Since December 2017, the title was re-branded to the Femmes Fatales Championship, after Femmes Fatales stopped working with Northern Championship Wrestling (NCW).

=== Inaugural tournament (2010) ===
Tournament Bracket

Round One (June 5, 2010)
LuFisto	Pin
Sara Del Rey
Kalamity	Pin
Sweet Cherrie
Portia Perez	Pin
PJ Tyler
Nicole Matthews
Cheerleader Melissa	Pin

Round Two (October 23, 2010)
LuFisto	Pin
Kalamity
Portia Perez	Pin
Cheerleader Melissa

Finals (October 23, 2010)
LuFisto	Pin
Portia Perez

== Reigns ==
As of October 10, 2026, there have been 13 reigns between 10 champions and three vacancies. LuFisto was the inaugural champion. Mercedes Martinez holds the record for most reigns, at three. Alexia Nicole's reign is the longest at 1,220 days, while Sally's reign is the shortest at 21 days.

Nicole Matthews is the current champion in her first reign. She won the title by defeating Nicole at Smash X Femmes Fatales Girls Next Door on June 25, 2023, in Toronto, Ontario, Canada.

=== Names ===
Name	Years
NCW Femmes Fatales Championship	October 23, 2010 – October 8, 2011
NCW Femmes Fatales International Championship	October 8, 2011 – December 2017
Femmes Fatales Championship	December 2017 – present

Key
No.	Overall reign number
Reign	Reign number for the specific champion
Days	Number of days held
+	Current reign is changing daily

No.	Champion	Championship change			Reign statistics		Notes	Ref.
No.	Champion	Date	Event	Location	Reign	Days	Notes	Ref.
1	LuFisto	October 23, 2010	NCW Femmes Fatales IV	Montreal, Quebec, Canada	1	350	Defeated Portia Perez in the finals of an eight-woman single-elimination tournament, which was a No Disqualification match, to become the inaugural champion.	
2	Kalamity	October 8, 2011	NCW Femmes Fatales VII	Montreal, Quebec, Canada	1	539		
3	Mercedes Martinez	March 30, 2013	NCW Femmes Fatales 15	Montreal, Quebec, Canada	1	504		
4	Courtney Rush	August 16, 2014	NCW Femmes Fatales XI	Montreal, Quebec, Canada	1	231	This was a four-way elimination match, also involving Cheerleader Melissa and LuFisto.	
5	LuFisto	April 4, 2015	NCW Femmes Fatales 17	Montreal, Quebec, Canada	2	119	This was a three-way match, also involving Saraya Knight.	
6	Jessika Black	August 1, 2015	NCW Festi-Lutte Show #2	Montreal, Quebec, Canada	1	238	This was a three-way match, also involving Stacy Thibault.	
—	Vacated	March 26, 2016	—	Sainte-Thérèse, Quebec, Canada	—	—	Jessika Black was injured for an undetermined amount of time and was forced to vacate the championship.	
7	Sally	March 26, 2016	NCW Femmes Fatales XIX	Sainte-Thérèse, Quebec, Canada	1	21	Defeated Midianne in the finals of a seven-woman tournament to win the vacant championship.	
8	Stefany Sinclair	April 16, 2016	NCW Challengemania 24	Sainte-Thérèse, Quebec, Canada	1	385	This was a three-way match, also involving Mary Lee Rose.	
9	Mercedes Martinez	May 6, 2017	NCW ChallengeMania 25	Sainte-Thérèse, Quebec, Canada	2	294		
10	Vanessa Kraven	February 24, 2018	Femmes Fatales 20	Ottawa, Ontario, Canada	1	434		
—	Vacated	March 26, 2019	—	Quebec, Canada	—	—	Vanessa Kraven vacated the championship due to injury.	
11	Mercedes Martinez	May 4, 2019	Femmes Fatales 22	Quebec, Canada	3	286	Defeated Kris Statlander to win the vacant championship.	
—	Vacated	February 14, 2020	—	—	—	—	Mercedes Martinez vacated the championship after signing with WWE.	
12	Alexia Nicole	February 21, 2020	Femmes Fatales 23	Ottawa, Ontario, Canada	1	1,220	Defeated Nicole Savoy to win the vacant championship.	
13	Nicole Matthews	June 25, 2023	Smash X Femmes Fatales Girls Next Door	Toronto, Ontario, Canada	1	1,203+		

== Combined reigns ==
As of October 10, 2026.

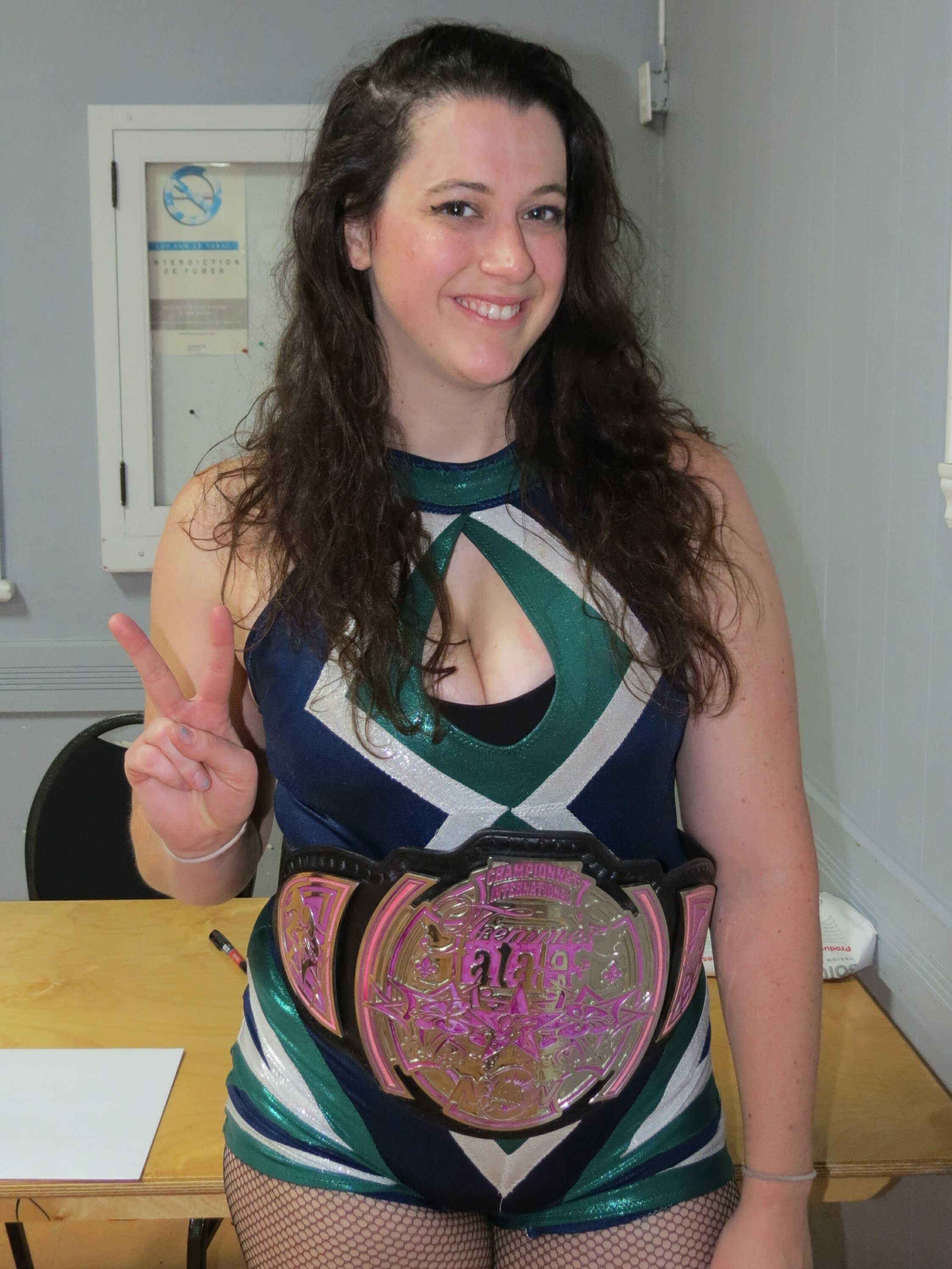
Current champion Nicole Matthews

†	Indicates the current champion

Rank	Wrestler	No. of reigns	Combined days
1	Alexia Nicole	1	1,220
2	Mercedes Martinez	3	1,084
3	Nicole Matthews †	1	1,203+
4	Kalamity	1	539
5	LuFisto	2	469
6	Vanessa Kraven	1	434
7	Stéfany Sinclair	1	385
8	Jessika Black	1	238
9	Courtney Rush	1	231
10	Sally	1	21
