= Calamity =

Calamity may refer to:

- Disaster, a terrible event

== Arts, entertainment, and media ==
=== Books ===
- Calamity, the third book in the series The Reckoners by Brandon Sanderson
- Calamity James, a British comic book character from The Beano
- Calamity Town, a 1942 novel by Ellery Queen
- "Calamity", an ability that the stand 'Wonder of U' uses in the 8th part of the JoJo's Bizarre Adventure series, JoJolion

=== Film and television ===
- Calamity (film), 1982 Czechoslovak film
- Calamity, a Childhood of Martha Jane Cannary, 2020 animated film
- Calamity Jane (film), a 1953 film based on the person
- Calamity Coyote, a fictional character in Tiny Toon Adventures
- Calamity Crow, a fictional crow from the television series Heroes of the City

=== Games ===
- Calamity (board game), board game released by Games Workshop in 1983
- The Calamity, a central plot point for the 2011 video game Bastion
- Calamity Mod, a mod for the 2011 video game Terraria
- Calamity Ganon, or simply Ganon, a character in The Legend of Zelda video game series

=== Music ===
- Calamity (album), by The Curtains (2008)
- "Calamity", a song by Zayn from his 2021 album Nobody Is Listening

== Other uses ==
- Al-Qaria (English: the calamity), the 101st sura of the Quran dealing with the end of time
- Calamity Jane (1852–1903), American frontierwoman

== See also ==
- Kalamity (disambiguation)
