= Kalamity =

Kalamity may refer to:

- Kalamity (film), a 2010 American psychological thriller film
- Kalamity, a wrestler who won the Femmes Fatales Championship
- Kalamity the Vulture, a character from World of Quest
- British K-class submarine, nicknamed "Kalamity class"
- Mo'Kalamity, a French-Cape Verdean musician
- Nepenthes 'Kalamity', a cultivar of a manmade hybrid of carnivorous plants

== See also ==
- Calamity (disambiguation)
