= Vanessa Kraven =

Canadian professional wrestler

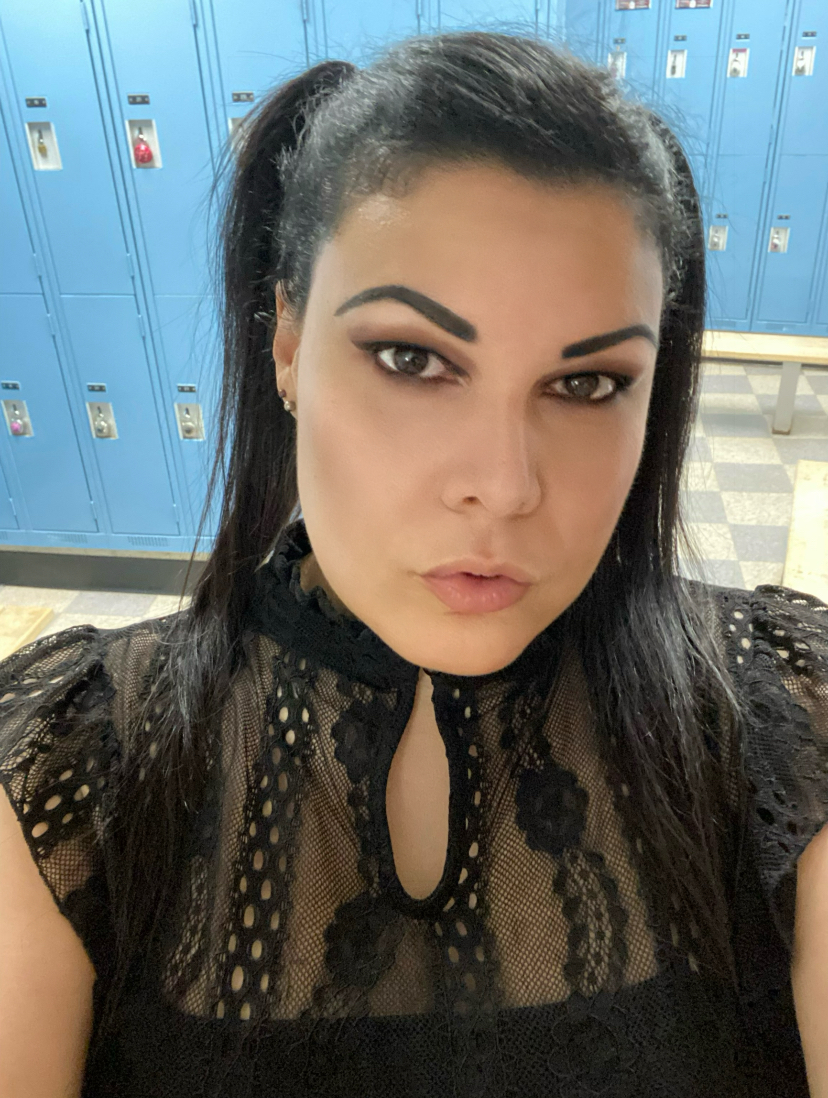
- Vanessa Kraven in March 2024

Personal information
- Born: February 10, 1982 (age 44) Montreal, Quebec, Canada

Professional wrestling career
- Ring name(s): Vanessa Kraven; Vanessa the Mountain
- Billed height: 6 ft 0 in (1.83 m)
- Billed weight: 195 lb (88 kg)
- Billed from: Deadhorse, Alaska
- Trained by: Ron Hutchison; Zachary Springate III
- Debut: April 2004

Vanessa Kraven (born February 10, 1982) is a Canadian professional wrestler who has competed in several independent promotions in both the United States and Canada. She made several trips to Japan for wrestling between 2006 to 2010 and was a competitor in WWE's second Mae Young Classic tournament in 2018. After having suffered a broken ankle in late 2018, Kraven returned to professional wrestling and had a match against Hikaru Shida for All Elite Wrestling's AEW Dark in October 2022 and has been active on the independent scene since.

== Professional wrestling career ==
=== Canadian promotions ===
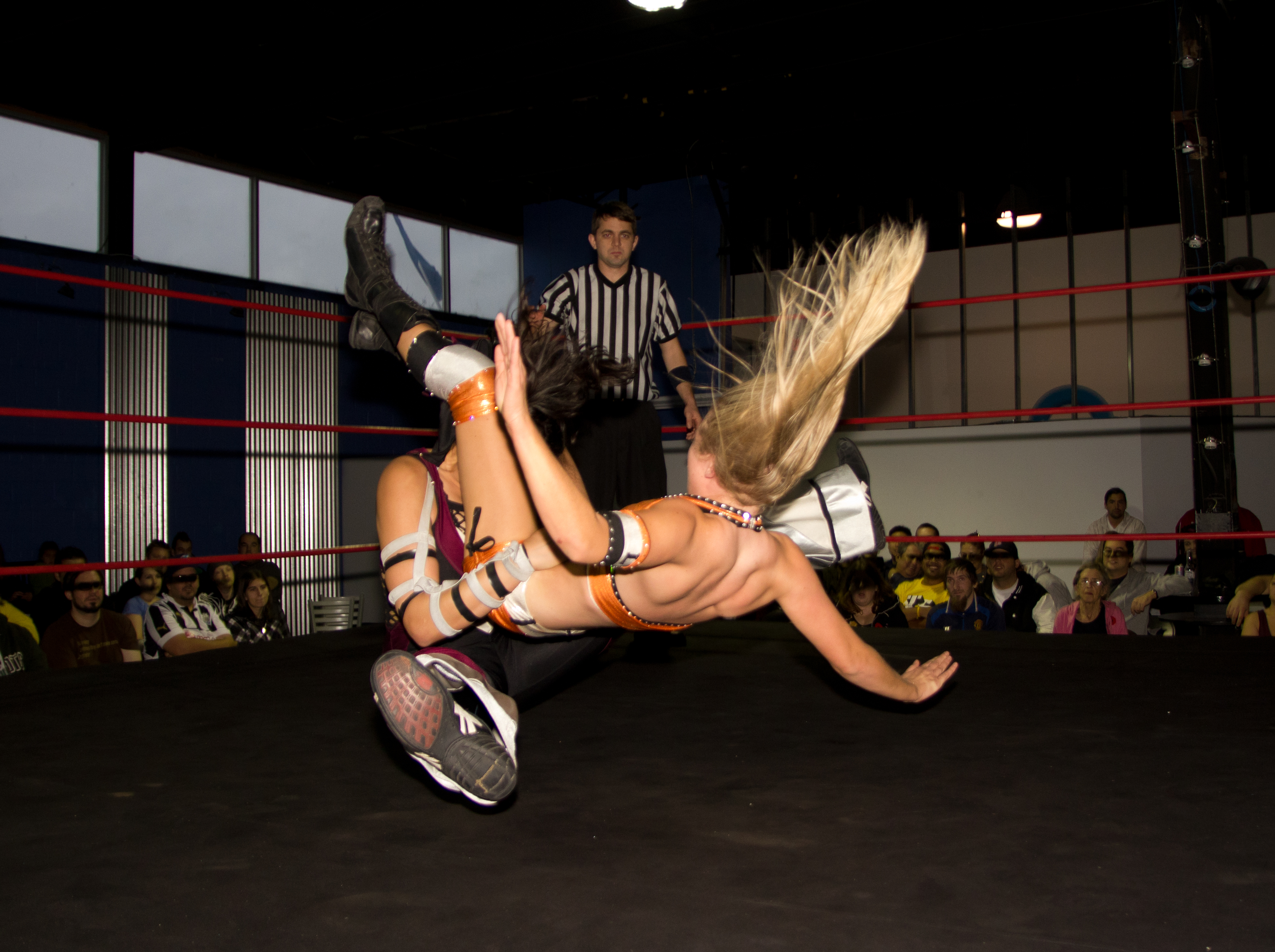
Kraven performing a spinning sit-down powerbomb on Leah von Dutch.

Kraven became interested in professional wrestling at an early age and later as a teenager during the so-called "Attitude Era". After graduating from hairdressing school in 2002, she began training at Sully's Gym under Ron Hutchison in Toronto and later under Zaquary Springate III in the United States, before eventually making her professional debut in April 2004.

In April 2004, at Northern Championship Wrestling (NCW)'s ChallengeMania, she was introduced as "Vanessa Kraven" with a goth in-ring persona and appeared with her storyline half-brother James Kraven as an ally and bodyguard. She became a mainstay in the promotion, continuing to appear as a wrestler and valet with James Kraven, most notably, at the Night of the Blizzard supercard where James Kraven and Stalker faced brothers Adib and Sidi Mansour on the undercard. She was the last NCW Women's Champion, having held the title between early 2005 and August 2006, when NCW's women's division was disbanded.

Beginning in 2005, she worked for Montreal's International Wrestling Syndicate, debuting on March 26 by helping Kid Kamikaze win a match. She remained allied with Kamikaze over the next several months, managing him and aiding him during matches. She made her wrestling debut for the promotion on July 23, when she and Takao lost a tag team match to Damian and Kenny the Bastard. She picked up her first victory in December, defeating Lex Lurmon and Jagger Miles in a handicap match. Over the next year, she regularly competed in intergender matches, which included victories over Eric Lauze, Franky The Mobster, and Beef Wellington. In March 2007, she unsuccessfully challenged for the IWS Canadian Championship in a six-way match won by reigning champion Don Paysan. Later that year, she formed an alliance with Twiggy to take on SLI 2007 (Fred la Merveille and Kenny the Bastard), and on January 26, 2008, they lost a tag team match to the pair at Praise the Violence. Her last appearance for the promotion for several years was on August 23, when her match with LuFisto ended in a no contest when they were both attacked by Wellington. She returned to the promotion for the final show in 2010, competing in a six-way elimination match for the IWS Canadian Championship; the match was won by Max Boyer and also included Shayne Hawke, Alex Silva, Kid Kamikaze, and Mike Bailey.

In 2006, she made two appearances for Ontario's BSE Pro promotion; on May 7, she was unsuccessful in a five-way match won by Kobra Kai, and also including Don Paysan, El Vigote Dos, and Ash, and on July 9, she and Tiana Ringer lost a tag team match to Shantelle Taylor and Tracy Brooks. In 2007, she teamed with SeXXXy Eddy in a mixed tag team match against Kacey Diamond and Exess at the Association de Lutte Feminine's Sherri Martel Memorial Cup tournament.

Since 2012, she has been wrestling and has made appearances for Canadian promotions such as C*4 (Ottawa), Acclaim Wrestling (Ottawa), Smash Wrestling (Toronto) and BATTLEWAR (Montreal).

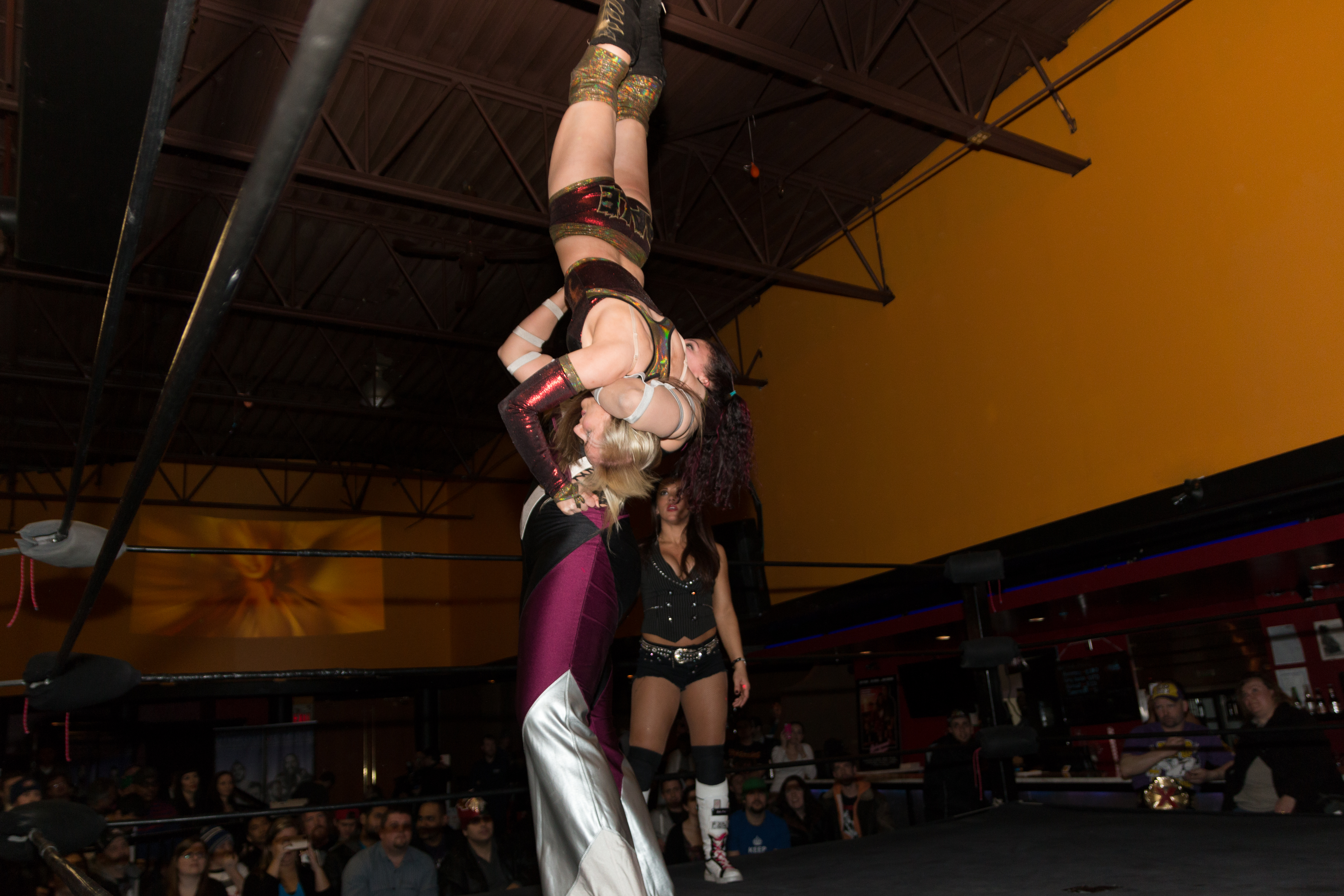
Kraven executing a delayed vertical suplex on Xandra Bale

In April 2014, she debuted for NCW Femmes Fatales. Over the next several months, she picked up victories over wrestlers including Sassy Stephie and Jody D'Milo.

Since returning from hiatus in April 2022, Kraven has wrestled for and made appearances at Canadian promotions such as C*4 and Acclaim in Ottawa, Destiny Wrestling in Toronto, Main Event Wrestling in Montreal, Femmes Fatales, and East Coast Pro Wrestling in Cape Breton, Nova Scotia.

On April 20, 2024, Kraven debuted for East Coast Pro Wrestling in Cape Breton, Nova Scotia and won the ECPW women's championship from fan favorite Divya Fiji.

=== Japanese promotions ===
Kraven has done five tours of Japan. Her Japan debut being for the NEO Japan Ladies promotion in August 2006. Appearing for the Wrestle Expo in Tokyo, she was unsuccessful in gaining a victory against NWA Women's Pacific and NEO Single Champion Yoshiko Tamura during NEO's World Women's Wrestling Classic (WWWC) World Cup Tournament. During her tours of Japan, Kraven has worked for NEO, Ice Ribbon, Pro Wrestling WAVE, JWP and Jd' Star. Her last Japan tour was in May 2010, working three shows for NEO and one show for JWP.

=== United States-based promotions ===
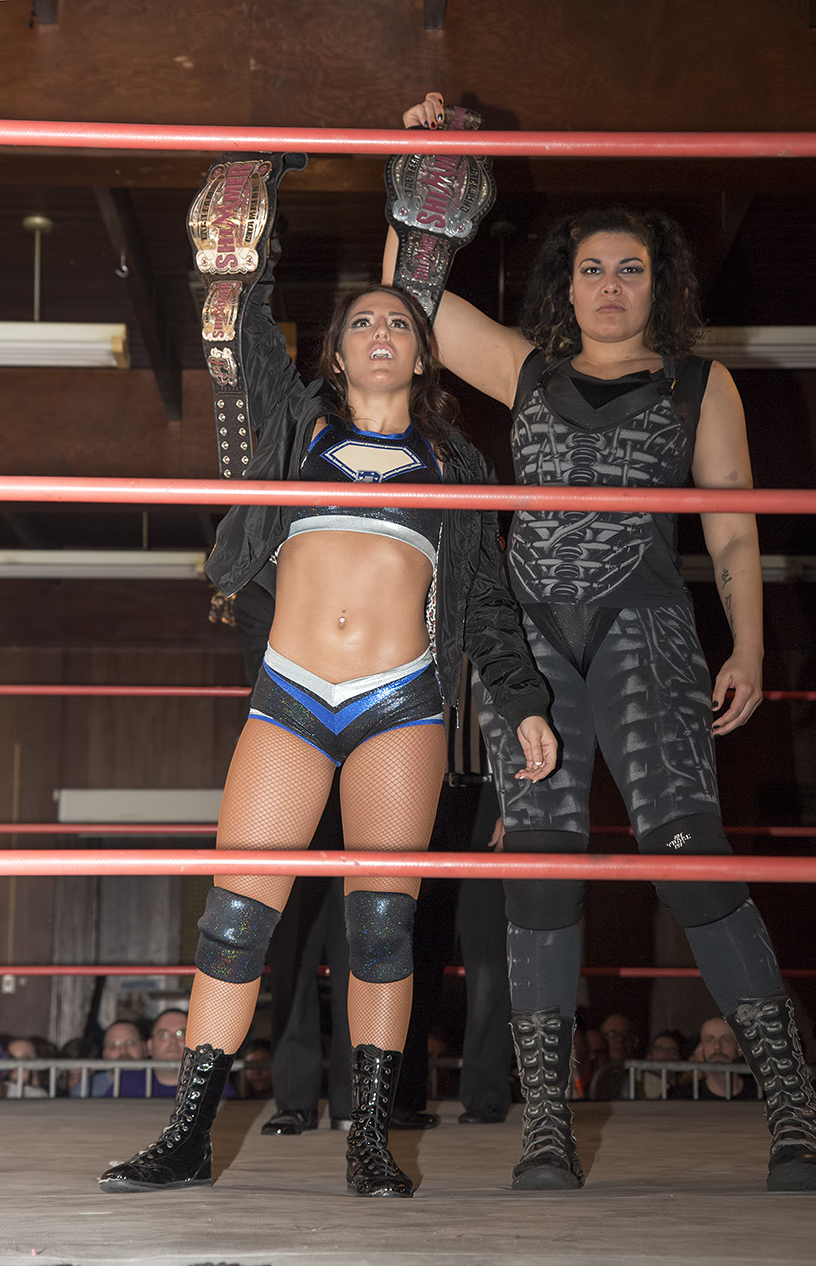
In SHIMMER Kraven aligned herself with Tessa Blanchard in a tag-team known as "Mount Tessa". Together the duo won the Shimmer Tag Team Championship in 2016 and reigned for almost exactly a full year.

In 2006, she had a brief stint in IWA Mid-South; on April 1, she and Daizee Haze lost to Mickie Knuckles and MsChif in an elimination tag team match for the NWA Midwest Women's Championship, when Knuckles pinned Kraven to win the match. At the inaugural Queen of the Deathmatch tournament in November, Kraven was eliminated by Rachel Putski in a thumbtack death match during the quarterfinals.

In April 2014, Kraven debuted for Shimmer Women Athletes on Volume 62 in New Orleans, losing to Kay Lee Ray. She returned to the promotion in October, in the Berwyn Eagles club defeating Jessicka Havok by countout on Volume 68 and defeating Crazy Mary Dobson on Volume 70. In December 2014, Kraven made her debut for Shine Wrestling, in Tampa, Florida defeating Leva Bates.

On July 30, 2018, WWE announced that Kraven would compete in the 2018 Mae Young Classic tournament. She was eliminated in the first round after losing to Lacey Lane.

On October 18, 2022, Kraven made her debut for All Elite Wrestling (AEW), wrestling Hikaru Shida on AEW Dark.

In June 2023, Kraven debuted for All Caribbean Wrestling, a promotion that runs shows in Florida as well as the Caribbean, aligning herself with women's wrestler Mazzerati.

=== Injury, first retirement and return ===
In October 2018, a few months after the WWE Mae Young Classic, Kraven broke her leg and ankle during an indie wrestling match. She underwent a surgery in November 2018 and has not wrestled since. On August 11, 2020, Kraven announced her retirement from professional wrestling. However, following the end of the COVID-19 pandemic, Kraven returned to wrestling in April 2022.

== Championships and accomplishments ==
- Acclaim Pro Wrestling
  - APW Heavyweight Championship (1 time)
- Northern Championship Wrestling
  - NCW Women's Championship (1 time)
  - NCW Femmes Fatales International Championship (1 time)
- Pro Wrestling Eclipse
  - PWE Flame Championship (1 time)
  - PWE Flame Championship Tournament (2017)
- Pro Wrestling Illustrated
  - Ranked No. 35 of the best 50 female singles wrestlers in the PWI Female 50 in 2016
- Shimmer Women Athletes
  - Shimmer Tag Team Championship (1 time) - with Tessa Blanchard
- East Coast Pro Wrestling
  - ECPW Women's Champion (current)
