= Nicole Matthews =

Canadian professional wrestler

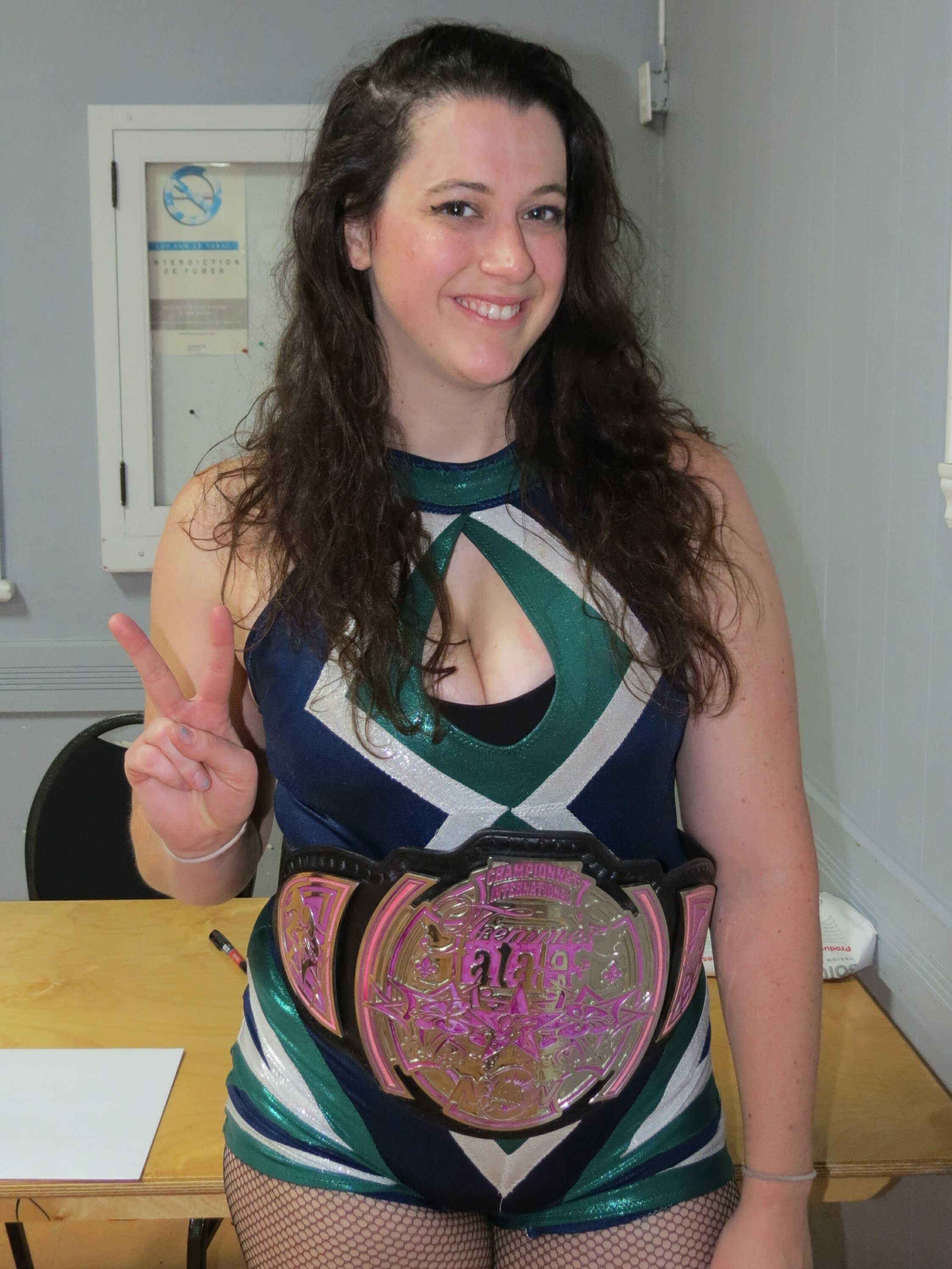
- Matthews as the Femmes Fatales Champion

Personal information
- Born: Lindsay Duncan; January 15, 1987 (age 39) Coquitlam, British Columbia, Canada
- Education: Simon Fraser University

Professional wrestling career
- Ring name(s): Hope; Nicole Matthews; Nicole; Nikki Matthews
- Billed height: 5 ft 9 in (1.75 m)
- Billed weight: 190 lb (86 kg; 14 st)
- Billed from: Vancouver, British Columbia, Canada; Coquitlam, British Columbia, Canada
- Trained by: Michelle Starr; Scotty Mac; Vance Nevada; Aaron Idol; Halo
- Debut: February 2006

Lindsay Miller (née Duncan; born January 15, 1987) is a Canadian professional wrestler better known by her ring name Nicole Matthews. Matthews regularly wrestled for Shimmer Women Athletes and Elite Canadian Championship Wrestling before their closure and for other independent promotions. She regularly teamed with fellow Canadian wrestler the now retired Portia Perez as the Canadian NINJAs, and the pair former two-time Shimmer Tag Team Champions.

== Professional wrestling career ==
=== Extreme Canadian Championship Wrestling / Elite Canadian Championship Wrestling (2006–2020) ===
Matthews was originally convinced to try a career in professional wrestling by her friend, male wrestler Sid Sylum. She made her professional wrestling debut in February 2006 alongside fellow trainee Veronika Vice. In March and September 2006, Matthews began wrestling for SuperGirls Wrestling, part of NWA: Extreme Canadian Championship Wrestling. On October 27, 2007, she defeated Nattie Neidhart and Vice in a three-way match for the SuperGirls Championship. She defended the championship against Vice and Aurora in the following weeks. Vice, however, defeated Matthews for the title on April 21, 2007. During this time, Matthews also formed a partnership with Sid Sylum, wrestling with him in mixed tag team matches and occasionally acting as his valet. Matthews continued to feud with Vice for the remainder of the year. In March 2008, Matthews regained the SuperGirls Championship in a match against Penni Lane. She, however, lost the title to Veronika Vice on February 7, 2009.

On October 29, 2010, Matthews defeated Tenille Tayla in a Tables match to win the SuperGirls Championship for the third time. She lost the title nearly a year later, on October 28, 2011, to KC Spinelli. In early 2012, Matthews formed a new stable known as The Riot in ECCW, alongside Ravenous Randy Myers, Alex Plexis and Andy "The Dreadful" Bird.

=== Shimmer Women Athletes (2007–2019) ===
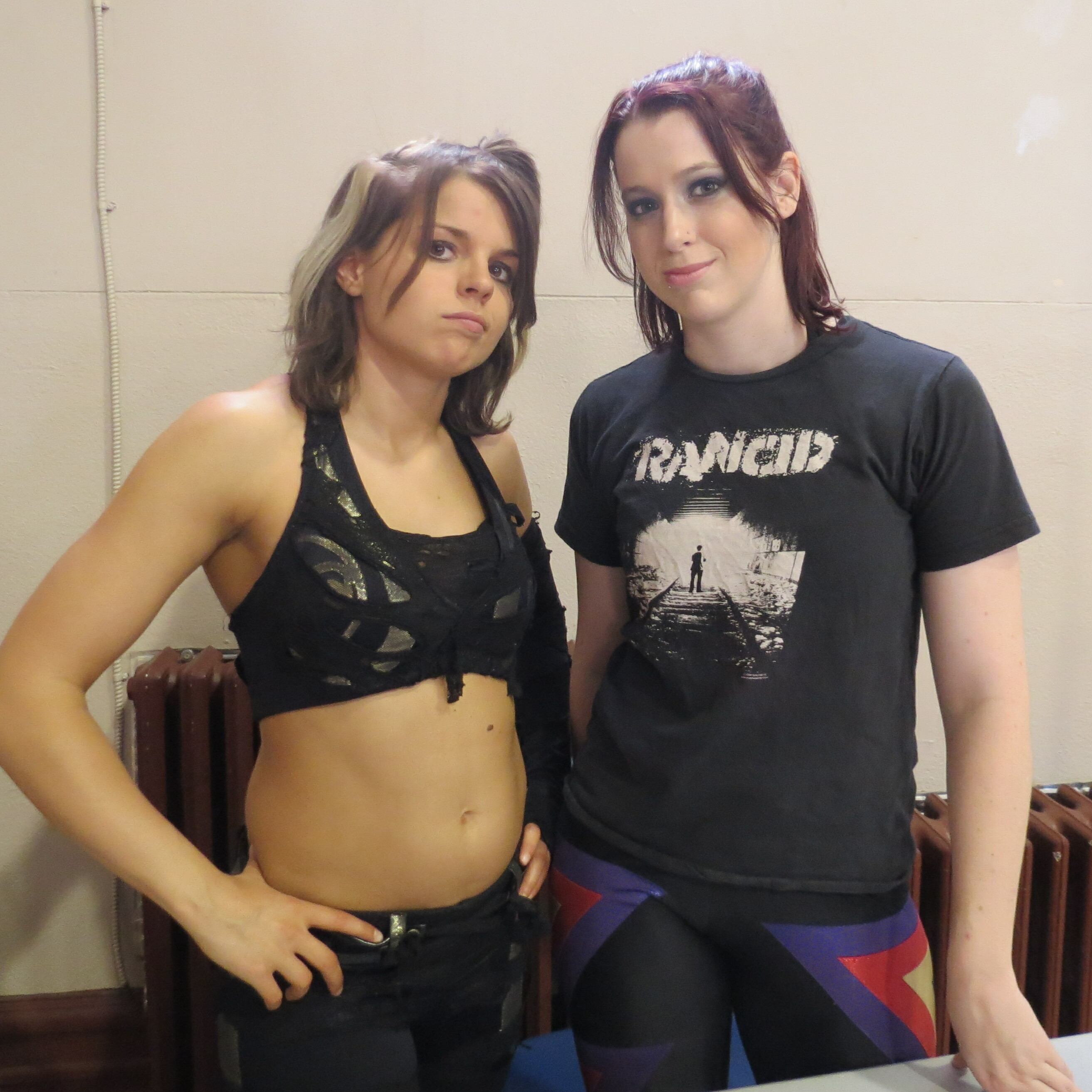
The Canadian Ninjas - Portia Perez (left) and Nicole Matthews (right) in 2012

Matthews sent a demo tape to Shimmer Women Athletes in December 2006, but was not signed to the promotion. In October 2007, however, Matthews was called to join the company when Portia Perez needed a tag team partner. Matthews teamed with Perez in Shimmer Volumes 15 and 16. After three singles matches with Shimmer, Matthews once again began teaming with Perez as the Canadian NINJAs (National International Nation of Jalapeño Awesomeness). On October 19, 2008, on Volume 22, the NINJAs challenged Ashley Lane and Nevaeh for the Shimmer Tag Team Championship, but were unsuccessful. On Volume 23, taped on May 2, 2009, she fought Daizee Haze to a 20-minute time limit draw, before losing to her in a rematch on Volume 24. On May 3, at the tapings of Volume 26, Matthews and Perez defeated Ashley Lane and Nevaeh to win the Shimmer Tag Team Championship. On November 8, Matthews came back as a singles competitor by losing to Cheerleader Melissa as part of Volume 27, but winning against Allison Danger as part of Volume 28. After a reign of 692 days, Matthews and Perez lost the Shimmer Tag Team Championship to Hiroyo Matsumoto and Misaki Ohata on March 26, 2011.

On October 2, 2011, the Ninjas failed in their attempt to win back the championship, losing to Ayumi Kurihara and Ayako Hamada, but later that evening, Matthews attacked Cheerleader Melissa from behind after Melissa had won the Shimmer Championship from Madison Eagles. As a result, Matthews received a championship match against Melissa on March 17, 2012, at the Volume 45 tapings but was unsuccessful. The following night, at the tapings of Volume 48, The NINJAs participated in a four-way elimination tag team match, but were the final team eliminated by Courtney Rush and Sara Del Rey, who won the Shimmer Tag Team Championship. On July 7, The NINJAs defeated Rush and Del Rey at an NCW Femmes Fatales (NCW FF) event to win the Shimmer Tag Team Championship for the second time. They lost the title to the Global Green Gangsters (Kellie Skater and Tomoka Nakagawa) on April 14, 2013, at the tapings of Volume 57. After drawing with Madison Eagles in a number one contender's match at Volume 67, both progressed to a four-way championship match at Volume 68 also involving Cheerleader Melissa and Athena. On October 18, Matthews won the match to become the new Shimmer Champion, making her the first Canadian to have held the title. She successfully defended the championship against Evie at the Volume 69 tapings, and retained the championship by disqualification against Tomoka Nakagawa at Volume 70 when Perez interfered. On October 10, 2015, on Volume 77, Matthews lost the Shimmer Championship to Madison Eagles in a No Disqualification match.

=== Other promotions (2009–present) ===
In early 2009 Matthews took part in the first season tapings of Wrestlicious, which began airing in March 2010. In the promotion she uses the ring name Hope and forms the tag team The Naughty Girls with partner Faith, played by Portia Perez. She debuted on the fifth episode on March 31, teaming with Faith in a losing effort against the team of Charlotte and Paige Webb.

On May 30, 2010 it was announced that Matthews was to make her debut for NCW Femmes Fatales (NCW FF) as a participant in the tournament to declare the first ever NCW FF Champion, replacing the injured Kacey Diamond in a match against Cheerleader Melissa. Matthews, however, wasn't able to get the win in her debut on June 5, and Melissa advanced to the semi-finals. She continued to compete for NCW FF, facing wrestlers including Mercedes Martinez in singles competition, while continuing to team with Perez.

=== International excursions (2011–present) ===
Matthews has wrestled in both Australia and Japan. In Australia she faced competitors including Madison Eagles and Jessie McKay in Pro Wrestling Women's Alliance. She toured Japan with her Canadian NINJAs partner Portia Perez, with the duo facing opponents including Hiroyo Matsumoto and Saya.

=== WWE (2018) ===
On July 30, 2018, WWE announced that Matthews would compete in the 2018 Mae Young Classic tournament. She defeated Isla Dawn in the first round, but was eliminated by Tegan Nox in the second.

On September 27, 2018, Matthews was caught using a travel visa instead of a work visa to book independent shows and has been banned from working within the United States. She was banned from entering the country for five years.

=== DPW (2023–present) ===
Matthews would become the 4th ever DPW Women's World Champion when she defeated then-champion Dani Luna at Victory Lap 2025.

== Personal life ==
Matthews played volleyball and swam in high school. She attends Simon Fraser University, where she is studying kinesiology part-time. She previously taught swimming and worked as a lifeguard, before becoming a full-time Aquatic Program Supervisor.

== Championships and accomplishments ==
- Deadlock Pro-Wrestling
  - DPW Women's Worlds Championship (1 time)
- Extreme Canadian Championship Wrestling / Elite Canadian Championship Wrestling
  - ECCW Championship (3 times)
  - ECCW Tag Team Championship (2 times) – with Alex Plexis, Andy Bird and Randy Myers (Note: Matthews defended the title with either Alex Plexis, Andy "The Dreadful" Bird or "Ravenous" Randy Myers under the Freebird Rule.)
  - SuperGirls Championship/ECCW Women's Championship (5 times)
  - Pacific Cup (2017)
- Femmes Fatales
  - Femmes Fatales Championship (1 time, current)
- Nation Extreme Wrestling
  - NEW Women's Championship (1 time)
- Pro Wrestling Illustrated
  - Ranked No. 16 of the top 50 female wrestlers in the PWI Female 50 in 2015 and 2016
- Pure Wrestling Association
  - PWA Elite Women's Championship (1 time)
- Shimmer Women Athletes
  - Shimmer Championship (1 time)
  - Shimmer Tag Team Championship (2 times) – with Portia Perez
- Westside Xtreme Wrestling
  - Femmes Fatales Tournament (2023)
