= Allison Danger =

Canadian retired wrestler and wrestling manager

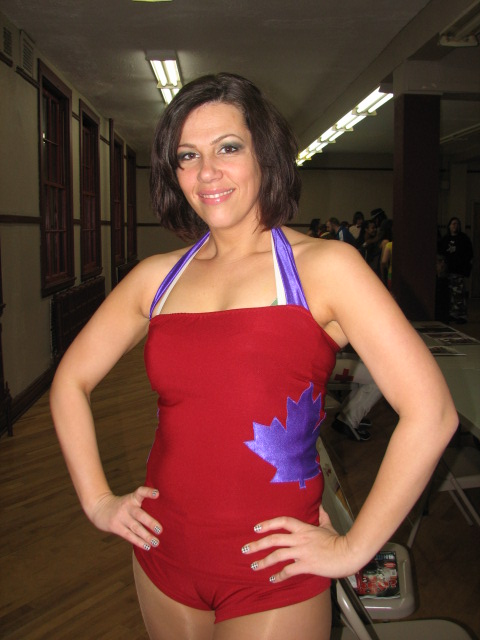
- Danger in 2011

Personal information
- Born: Cathy Allison Corino; March 31, 1977 (age 49) Winnipeg, Manitoba, Canada
- Spouse: Ares (m. 2008)
- Children: 1
- Family: Steve Corino (brother); Colby Corino (nephew)

Professional wrestling career
- Ring name(s): Allison; Allison Corino; Allison Danger; Lt. Desiree Storm
- Billed height: {5 ft 7 in
- Billed weight: 123 lb (56 kg)
- Billed from: The City of Angels (ROH)
- Trained by: Steve Corino; Mike Kehner; Rapid Fire Maldonado; Chikara Wrestle Factory; CM Punk
- Debut: May 2000
- Retired: April 14, 2013

Cathy Allison Corino (born March 31, 1977) is a Canadian retired professional wrestler and professional wrestling manager, better known by her ring name, Allison Danger.

== Professional wrestling career ==
=== Early career (2000–2002) ===
Corino's older brother Steve Corino is a professional wrestler as well, and while working for Extreme Championship Wrestling (ECW) he introduced his sister to the ECW locker room. Corino befriended Francine, a manager for ECW, and in May 2000 Francine and Corino attended an IWA Reading wrestling show in Reading, Pennsylvania together. ECW alumnus The Sandman's wife Lori (who usually accompanied him to ringside) was unavailable, so The Sandman invited Corino to substitute for her. Corino accepted at the urging of Francine and enjoyed the experience so much that she worked for the same company again several weeks later.

The next month, she joined the Independent Wrestling Federation (IWF) and began training under Rapid Fire Maldonado and her brother in the IWA Cruel School in Boyertown, Pennsylvania. Corino adopted the persona of Allison Danger, a tattooed punk. Her first match was a mixed tag match with Rapid Fire as her partner in Reading. Danger and Maldonado continued to team together, and on March 24, 2001, in Plainfield, New Jersey they won the IWF Tag Team Championships in a four-way tag match. After Maldonado suffered an injury, Biggie Biggs replaced him as Danger's partner. They lost the titles to Hadrian and Damian Adams on September 16, 2001, in West Orange, New Jersey.

Throughout 2003 Danger worked for Jersey All Pro Wrestling and IWA Mid South. Between July and August 2003, she toured Japan, replacing her friend Daffney who had to pull out at the last moment.

=== Ring of Honor (2000–2007) ===
Danger joined Ring of Honor (ROH) as the manager of the Christopher Street Connection. At the first show she took her first and only table bump at the hands of Da Hit Squad. After the Connection left ROH, she became the manager of The Prophecy, a heel stable led by Christopher Daniels who opposed ROH's "Code of Honor" and was feuding with The Group, led by Danger's brother Steve.

On June 12, 2004, Prophecy members Dan Maff and B. J. Whitmer turned face, abandoning the Prophecy name and firing Danger as their manager. She began feuding with Maff and Whitmer, and placed a bounty on their heads on June 24. Throughout the remainder of 2004 she hampered every action of her former clients, repeatedly costing them matches, and using her control of their contracts to book them in physically taxing matches. Despite her efforts, however, Maff and Whitmer defeated the Havana Pitbulls for the ROH Tag Team Championship on February 19, 2005. Danger then briefly feuded with Daizee Haze before leaving ROH.

Danger returned to ROH at Death before Dishonor III on June 18, 2005, and alluded to the return of Christopher Daniels to the promotion (Daniels was pulled from all ROH shows by Total Nonstop Action Wrestling in 2004 as a result of the Rob Feinstein controversy). She reformed her alliance with Daniels after he returned later that night. From July 2005 until Daniels left ROH in April 2007 she was his manager. The same weekend Daniels left ROH, Danger left as well.

=== Shimmer Women Athletes (2005–2013) ===
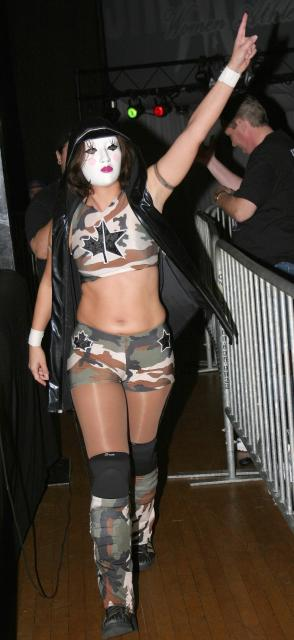
Danger in her entrance attire during a SHIMMER show

Danger was heavily involved with the running of Chicago-based female independent circuit independent professional wrestling promotion Shimmer Women Athletes. She co-ran the promotion along with Dave Prazak, as well as being an active wrestler and color commentator for the DVDs. Her notable feuds in Shimmer were against Rebecca Knox, Cindy Rogers, and Portia Perez.

At Shimmer's April 26 taping, Danger suffered a fractured clavicle in the closing moments of a tag-team match with Sara Del Rey against Cheerleader Melissa and MsChif. She missed three months of in-ring action, but still attended the shows, commentating and valeting whenever she could. When she was medically cleared to wrestle again, Danger announced that she was pregnant and that she and husband Ares were expecting their first child in 2009.

She engaged another big feud against Portia Perez of the Canadian NINJAs. After re-aggravating her shoulder injury on Volume 20, she made her return as part of the Volume 24 where she lost to Perez in a Street Fight match. Later in the night, as part of the Volume 25, she teamed with Daizee Haze winning a Tag Team match against the Canadian NINJAs after her pin over Perez. After missing Volume 26 she came back with a win over the Australian Kellie Skater. Later in the night however, as part of Volume 28, she lost against Nicole Matthews after Matthews hit Danger with a belt. On April 10, 2010, at the tapings of Volume 30, Danger defeated Perez in a Last Woman Standing match.

At the Volume 37 tapings, Danger formed a tag team with Leva Bates known as Regeneration X, defeating Jamilia Craft and Mia Yim in their first match together. Danger later received her first championship match in Shimmer when she and Bates challenged Ayako Hamada and Ayumi Kurihara for the Shimmer Tag Team Championship at Volume 45. However, they were not successful in winning the titles. At Volume 48, Regeneration X received another opportunity at the titles as part of a four-way elimination tag team match, and at Volume 52 against Danger's previous rivals the Canadian NINJAs. They were unsuccessful in these matches as well.

On April 9, 2013, Shimmer announced that Danger would be retiring from in-ring action after the following weekend's events. Danger wrestled her final match on April 14, 2013 on Volume 57. She and Leva Bates defeated Ayako Hamada and Cheerleader Melissa in a tag team match via reversed decision, when Melissa refused to release a submission hold on Danger. Post-match, Danger revealed that she had suffered a stroke the previous January, after which lesions were found in her brain; though they were not life-threatening, she was forced to end her in-ring career.

=== WWE (2021–2022) ===
On October 8, 2021, it was reported that Corino was signed by WWE as WWE Performance Center coach, after having been a guest coach at the facility in May of the same year. Joining her brother Steve Corino, at that time trainer and producer, Allison Corino was highly acclaimed on her job with the female recruits; however, her stint was cut short when she was released from her contract on January 5, 2022. In an interview conducted with Renee Paquette in July 2022, Corino stated that her stint in WWE had left her in financial and emotional ruin, as taking on the job required her to rent a new home in Florida just after her husband had purchased a new house in the Carolinas. When WWE released her just three months into the new job, Corino was left unemployed in a state she had no connection to and stuck in a lease she could not break. On July 9, it was confirmed that Corino joined Maria Kanellis' new promotion Women's Wrestling Army (WWA) as a coach.

== Personal life ==
Corino attended Perkiomen Valley High School in Collegeville, Pennsylvania, where she was a cheerleader and took part in field hockey, softball and track running. After graduating from high school, she played ice hockey for two years.

Corino married Swiss professional wrestler Marco Jaggi, known professionally as Ares, in 2008. The couple have one child together.

In May 2010, Corino launched her own podcast at the women's wrestling website Diva-Dirt.com. The show is co-hosted by her SHIMMER colleague Amber Gertner who appears as the backstage interviewer for the promotion.

== Championships and accomplishments ==
- Cauliflower Alley Club
  - Women's Wrestling Award (2024)
- Independent Wrestling Federation
  - IWF Tag Team Championship (1 time) – with Rapid Fire Maldonado
- International Catch Wrestling Association
  - ICWA Ladies Championship (1 time)
- New Breed Wrestling Association
  - NBWA Women's Championship (1 time)
- Pro Wrestling Illustrated
  - Ranked No. 21 of the top 50 female wrestlers in the PWI Female 50 in 2008
- Pro Wrestling WORLD-1
  - WORLD-1 Women's Championship (1 time)
- World Class Extreme Wrestling / ThunderGirls
  - WCEW/ThunderGirls Divas Championship (1 time)
- World Association of Wrestling
  - WAWW World Championship (1 time)
- World Xtreme Wrestling
  - WXW Women's Tag Team Championship (1 time) – with Alere Little Feather
