= She Nay Nay =

Canadian professional wrestler

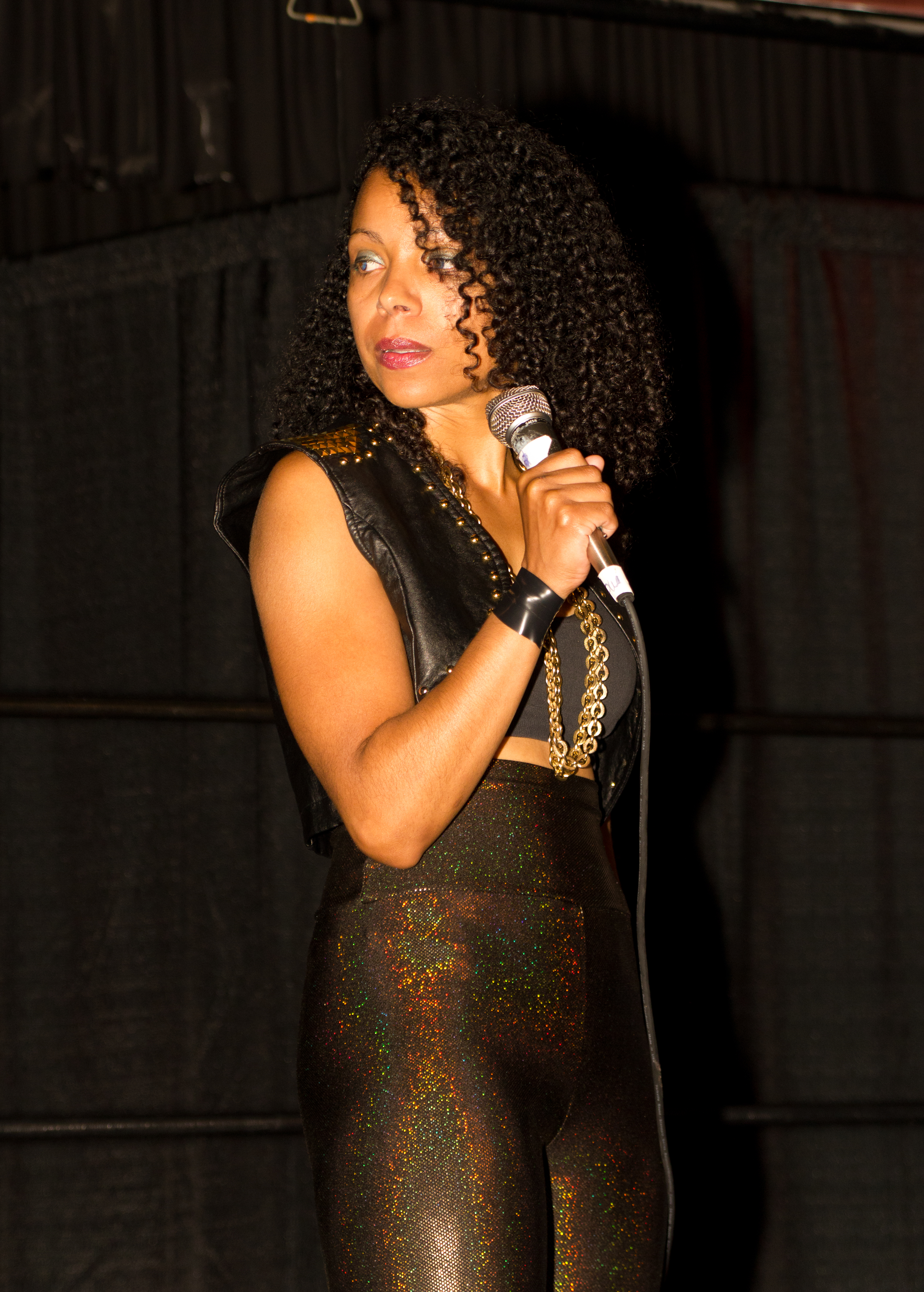
- She Nay Nay at an independent card in July 2011

Personal information
- Born: Athanasia Alexopoulos; January 1 Ottawa, Ontario, Canada

Professional wrestling career
- Ring name(s): Jenny Brooks; Mandy Vegas; Miss Anthea; The Queen B She Nay Nay
- Billed height: 5 ft 4 in (1.63 m)
- Billed weight: 120 lb (54 kg)
- Billed from: Miami, Florida; O-Town, Canada; Elmira, New York
- Trained by: Battle Ground Academy; Dave Dalton; Rip Rogers
- Debut: April 2004

Athanasia Alexopoulos is a Canadian professional wrestler, best known by her ring name She Nay Nay. She has worked for several Canadian, American, British, and Irish promotions including Atlantic Grand Prix Wrestling, NCW Femmes Fatales, Ohio Valley Wrestling, Shimmer Women Athletes, and Irish Whip Wrestling.

== Professional wrestling career ==
=== Canadian promotions ===
After deciding to become a wrestler, she attended a wrestling show at her high school which was promoted by Scott D'Amore. There she made several contacts in wrestling, which suggested that she should train with Dave Dalton. Dalton runs a professional wrestling school, the Battle Ground Academy, as well as the Universal Wrestling Alliance (UWA) promotion. She trained with Dalton for three months, before making her debut at a UWA show against Misty Haven in Lachute, Quebec. She wrestled a few more matches for UWA, before being booked by the Border City Wrestling and Empire State Wrestling promotions. In 2006, she sent a video to Emile Duprée, the promoter of Grand Prix Wrestling, and was booked for the summer tour of the Maritimes between May and August 2006. The tour included shows in New Brunswick, Nova Scotia, Prince Edward Island and Northern Quebec, and she wrestled Krista Kiniski on each show. On one night, she teamed with Frenchy Lamont to wrestle against Kiniski and Farmer Pierre. She returned to Grand Prix Wrestling in 2008, losing to Erin Angel.

She Nay Nay was part of the debut show of NCW Femmes Fatales on September 5, 2009. She competed in the first match of the promotion as a villain, wrestling and losing to Addy Starr. On the second show, which took place on February 6, 2010, she defeated Karen Brooks in the opening match, and was managed by former wrestler 21st Century Fox. She Nay Nay picked up victories over Xandra Bale and Rhia O'Reilly, but would lose to Veda Scott at Volume IX.

She Nay Nay competed during both parts of NCW Femmes Fatales X on November 3, 2012. In Part 1, she teamed up with Deziree in a victorious outing against Missy and Midianne, with the victory coming due to Midianne turning into a villain and betraying Missy. In Part 2, She Nay Nay teamed with Deziree and the heel-turned Midianne in a losing effort against Missy, Xandra Bale and Leah Von Dutch.

She has also wrestled for several other Canadian independent promotions, including the Defiance Wrestling Federation, where she teamed with SeXXXy Eddy to defeat Zaquary Springate III and Miss Danyah in an intergender tag team match on March 14, 2010. She competed in both Canadian Sports Entertainment and AWF in mid-2009, against wrestlers including Sweet Cherry, Cherry Bomb, and Jen Blake.

=== American promotions ===
In late 2006, she was invited to train at Ohio Valley Wrestling (OVW). Her first match for OVW took place on December 6, 2006 when she teamed with Serena Deeb to defeat the team of ODB and Beth Phoenix. On May 11, 2007 she competed in a Tag-War teaming up with Serena, Victoria Crawford and Maryse Ouellet to defeat the team of Beth, Katie Lea, Milena Roucka and Jennifer. One day later, however, suffered her first TV loss when she teamed with Serena and Jennifer against Katie, Beth and Milena. Her first TV Singles Match was against Beth Phoenix but she came up short. Her last match for OVW was a mixed tag team match that she lost.

On the October 30, 2009, episode of SmackDown, She Nay Nay wrestled under the name Jenny Brooks, losing a squash match to the evil Beth Phoenix.

After her performances on the first two NCW Femmes Fatales Shows she was booked to take part at the SHIMMER Tapings on May 2 and 3, 2010. She debuted as part of the SPARKLE Division losing to Leva Bates. The next day she competed in a tag team match with Anna Minoushka losing to the team of PJ Tyler and Leva Bates.

=== Overseas ===
In October 2007, She Nay Nay wrestled on several occasions for Irish Whip Wrestling in the Republic of Ireland, in both intergender and women's matches. She later wrestled for International Big Time Wrestling in the United Kingdom as "Miss Anthea". In early 2010, she toured South Korea with wrestlers including Raven, Scotty 2 Hotty, Eugene, and Billy Gunn. On October 14, 2012, She Nay Nay made her Japanese debut for World Wonder Ring Stardom in Tokyo, teaming with Hiroyo Matsumoto in a tag team match, where they were defeated by Io Shirai and Veda Scott.

== Other media ==
Alexopolous had a small role in the film Sacrifice, which was filmed in Ottawa.

== Personal life ==
Alexopolous has a sister, Anastasia, who also wrestles. Alexopolous was a city champion in her weight class, before advancing to Ontario Federation of School Athletic Associations on her high school wrestling team at Woodroffe High School on Ottawa. She later graduated from Notre Dame High School. In addition to wrestling, Alexopolous works as a customer service rep for a bank. She originally worked there full-time, before downgrading to part-time in order to have more freedom in her wrestling career. Before deciding to become a wrestler, she had considered becoming a stockbroker or a lawyer. She was inspired to become a wrestler after seeing a match between Jim Duggan and André the Giant.

== Championships and accomplishments ==
- International Big Time Wrestling
  - IBTM Women's Championship (1 time)
- Pro Wrestling Illustrated
  - Ranked No. 49 of the top 50 female wrestlers in the PWI Female 50 in 2013
- Universal Wrestling Alliance
  - UWA Women's Championship (1 time)
