= Femmes Fatales =

Canadian women's professional wrestling promotion

- Founded: 2009
- Style: Women's professional wrestling
- Headquarters: Montreal, Quebec, Canada
- Formerly: NCW Femmes Fatales (2010–2017)

Femmes Fatales is an independent women's professional wrestling promotion based in Montreal, Quebec, Canada. In September 2009, Northern Championship Wrestling (NCW) hosted their first edition of NCW Femmes Fatales which regrouped many fighting females in North America. NCW Femmes Fatales was announced in April 2010 to be part of the Female Fight League during the 45th Edition of the Cauliflower Alley Club Reunion in Las Vegas. In November 2009, they gave an homage to Maurice Vachon and Paul Vachon as part of a documentary tracing back Mad Dog's career.

On October 23, 2010, at NCW Femmes Fatales IV, LuFisto became the inaugural NCW Femmes Fatales Champion after defeating Portia Perez in a No Disqualification match, at the finals of an eight-woman single-elimination tournament. Since its establishment, the title was re-named to the NCW Femmes Fatales International Championship; it was eventually renamed the Femmes Fatales Championship, after no longer being associated with NCW.

== Championships ==
Championship	Current champion(s)	Reign	Date won	Days held	Location	Notes
Femmes Fatales Championship	Nicole Matthews	1	June 25, 2023	1,136+	Toronto, Ontario, Canada	Defeated Alexia Nicole on Smash X Femmes Fatales Girls Next Door.

== Roster ==
The following roster is correct as of Smash X Femmes Fatales Girls Next Door.

=== Wrestlers ===
- Alexia Nicole
- Allie Katch
- Hailey Dylan
- Jody Threat
- K. C. Spinelli
- Kristara
- Liiza Hall
- Mary Lee Rose
- Mercedes Martinez
- Miley
- Nicole Matthews – Femmes Fatales Champion
- Nikita
- Taylor Rising
- Trish Adora
- Vanessa Kraven
- Vert Vixen
