= Mae Young Classic =

Professional wrestling tournament

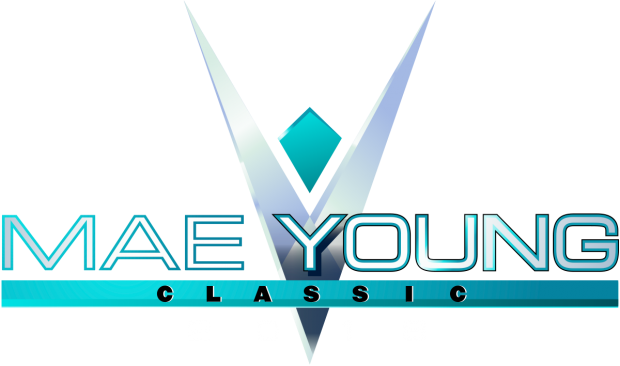
- WWE Mae Young Classic 2018 logo
- Promotion: WWE
- First event: 2017
- Last event: 2018

Tournament information
- Established: 2017; 9 years ago
- Defunct: 2018
- Final winner: Toni Storm
- Last completed: 2018
- Editions: 2
- Format: Single-elimination tournament
- Participants: 32
Statistics
- First winner: Kairi Sane
- Oldest winner: Kairi Sane (28 years, 354 days)
- Youngest winner: Toni Storm (23 years, 9 days)
- Heaviest winner: Toni Storm (143 lb (65 kg))
- Lightest winner: Kairi Sane (115 lb (52 kg))

The Mae Young Classic was a women's professional wrestling tournament and WWE Network event produced by WWE, an American-based professional wrestling promotion. The event was named in honor of Mae Young, a WWE Hall of Famer who is considered one of the pioneers of women's professional wrestling. The tournament was contested by wrestlers from WWE's NXT brand and wrestlers from the independent circuit. The winner received the Mae Young Classic Trophy.

To date, there have only been two tournaments. The first was held in the summer of 2017 and was won by Kairi Sane. The second was held in 2018 and was won by Toni Storm—the final of the second tournament was held at WWE's first all female pay-per-view, Evolution. As a result of both tournaments, many competitors from the independent circuit were signed by WWE to compete on their NXT brand, with some from the second tournament being signed to the upstart NXT UK brand. A 2019 tournament was planned but fell through.

== History ==
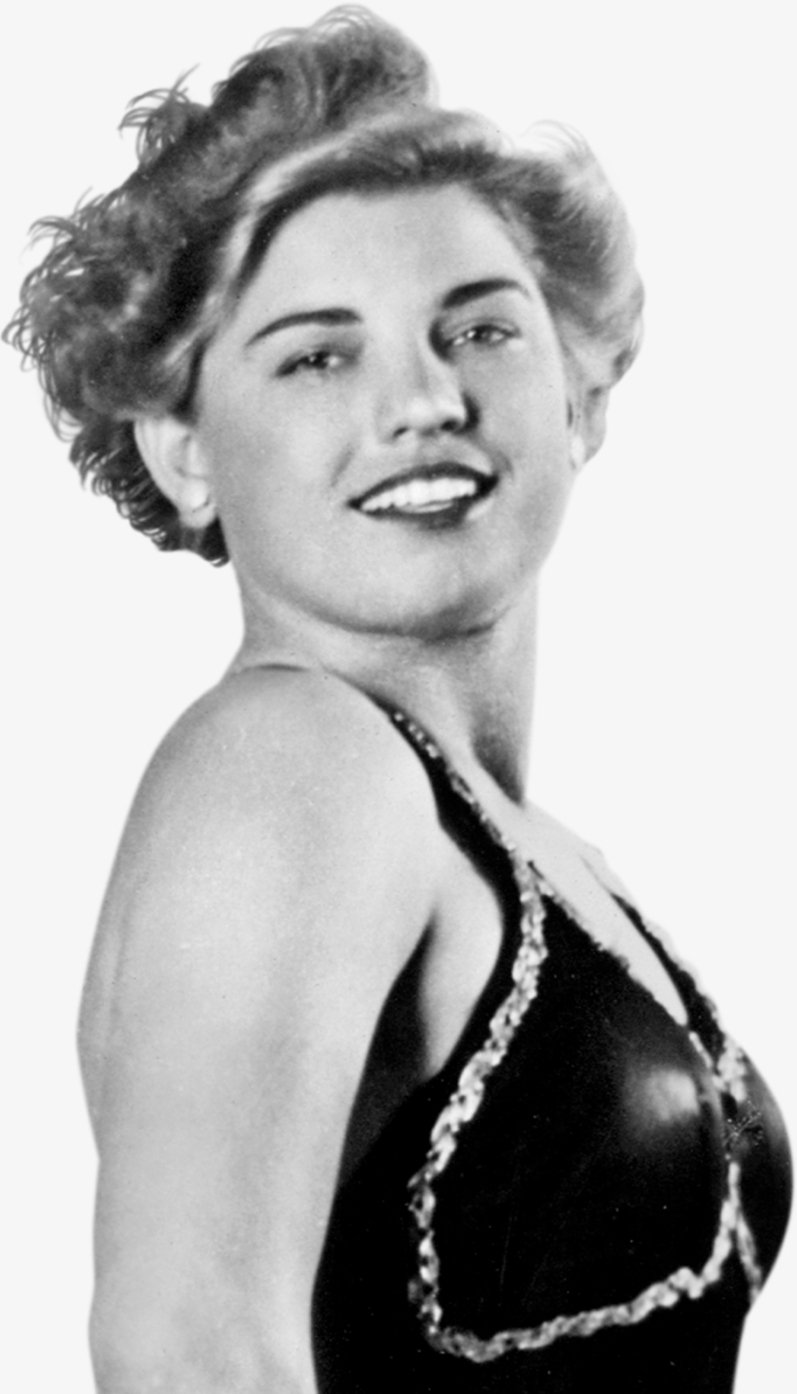
Mae Young – WWE Hall of Famer and the tournament's namesake

At a press conference during the weekend of WrestleMania 33, the American professional wrestling promotion WWE announced that a women's tournament would be taking place in the summer of 2017, with a total of 32 wrestlers competing. It was also announced that the tournament would be involve wrestlers from WWE's NXT brand and wrestlers from the independent circuit and would air on the company's online streaming service, the WWE Network. The event was named in honor of Mae Young, a WWE Hall of Famer who is considered one of the pioneers of women's professional wrestling. The inaugural tournament was won by Kairi Sane.

In April 2018, a second tournament was announced, and like the first, it also featured wrestlers from WWE's NXT brand and those from the independent circuit and also aired on the WWE Network. It was also held in the summer, but the final was scheduled for WWE's first all female pay-per-view, Evolution on October 28. The winner of the second tournament was Toni Storm.

In August 2019, WWE executive and NXT head Triple H confirmed that a 2019 edition of the Mae Young Classic was being planned. In October, WWE listed tickets for sale for November 2–3; however, the posting was later removed and the 2019 tournament never happened.

== Prize ==
The winner of the Mae Young Classic was awarded the Mae Young Classic Trophy, made in the likeness of the event's logo for that respective year. Kairi Sane was also awarded a match for the NXT Women's Championship for winning the 2017 tournament; however, Toni Storm did not receive a championship match for winning the 2018 tournament.

== Events and winners ==
#	Year	Winner	Finals date	Runner-up	Finals location	Ref.
1	2017	Kairi Sane	September 12, 2017	Shayna Baszler	Paradise, Nevada	
2	2018	Toni Storm	October 28, 2018	Io Shirai	Uniondale, New York	
