= Portia Perez =

Canadian former professional wrestler (born 1987)

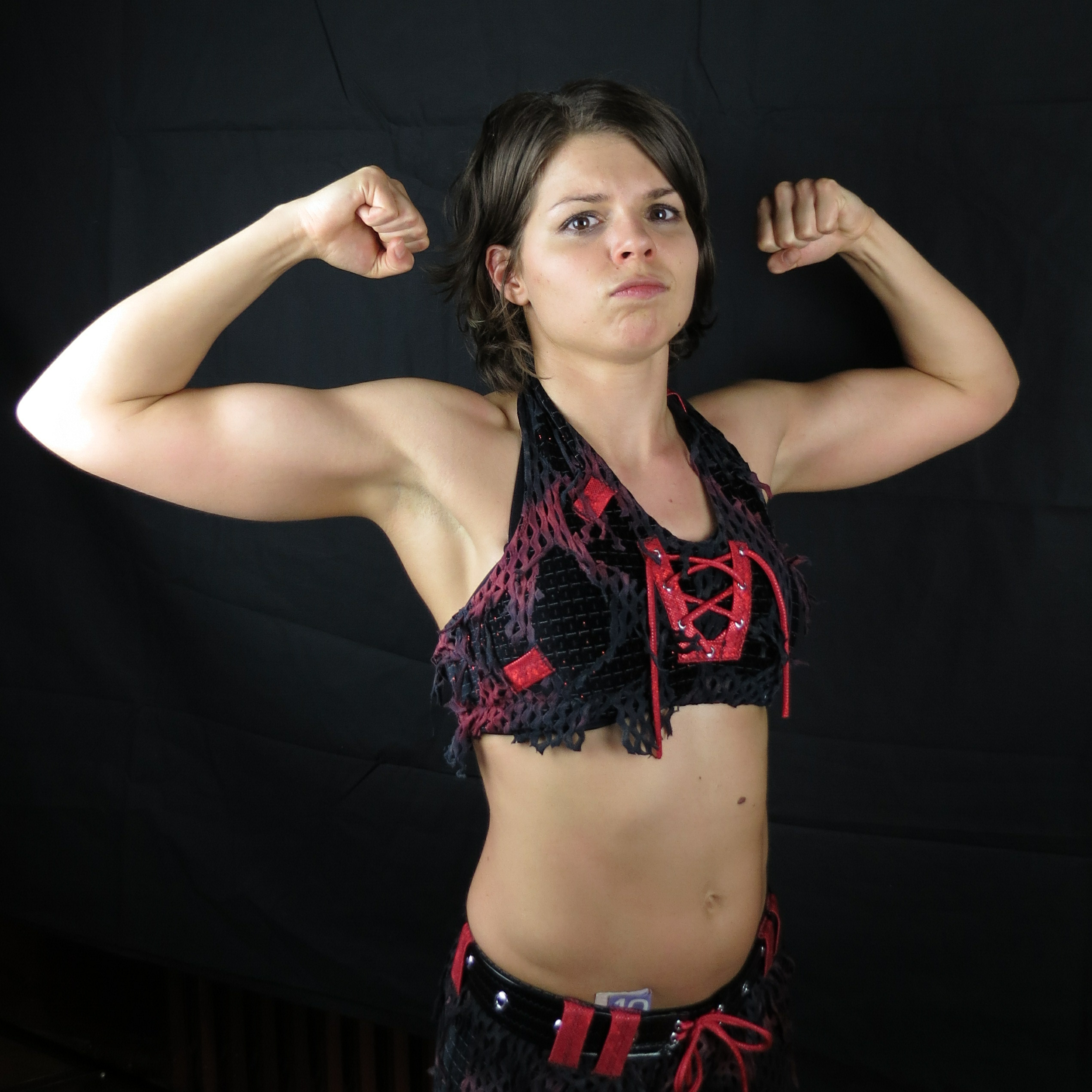
- Perez in 2012

Personal information
- Born: Jenna Grattan; October 26, 1987 (age 38) Brockville, Ontario, Canada

Professional wrestling career
- Ring name(s): Faith; Portia Perez; Xtasis; Dr. Monstrous
- Billed height: 5 ft 3 in (1.60 m)
- Billed weight: 123 lb (56 kg)
- Billed from: Ottawa, Ontario; Hollywood, California; Boston, Massachusetts
- Trained by: Dave Dalton; Tyson Dux; Max Alexander; Adam Cage; Cody Hawk; Matt Stryker; Mikey Whiplash; Chris Hero; Delirious
- Debut: December 2003
- Retired: October 11, 2015

Jenna Grattan (born October 26, 1987) is a Canadian former professional wrestler better known by her ring name Portia Perez. Perez teamed with Nicole Matthews as The Canadian NINJAs, and they are former two-time Shimmer Tag Team Champions.

== Professional wrestling career ==
=== Early career ===
Perez made her professional debut in mid-2004 for Professional Wrestling Entertainment. While still in high school, Portia took bookings with many companies in Quebec and Ontario, including the promotion she trained with: Universal Wrestling Alliance. In 2005, Perez began accepting bookings in the United States, making her United States debut for Cleveland All Pro Wrestling. She also competed for several other American companies, such as Heartland Wrestling Association in Cincinnati, Ohio, and IWA East Coast in Charleston, West Virginia.

=== Shimmer Women Athletes ===
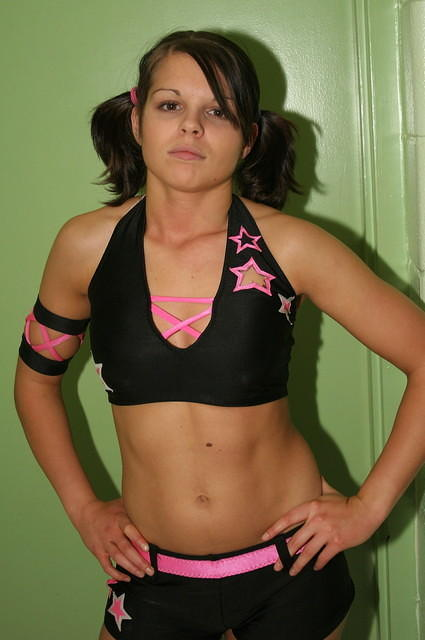
Perez in 2008

Perez debuted for Shimmer Women Athletes in May 2006. Perez missed all of her June and July 2007 dates after suffering a broken hand in a match against MsChif at Shimmer Women Athletes's show of June 2. She returned to action at Ring of Honor's show of July 27 in Long Island. In October 2007, Perez formed a regular tag team with Nicole Matthews, later dubbed The Canadian NINJAs (National International Nation of Jalapeño Awesomeness). She began a feud with Allison Danger at Shimmer's July 5, 2008, show. On May 3, 2009, at the tapings of Volume 26 Perez and Matthews defeated Ashley Lane and Nevaeh to win the Shimmer Tag Team Championship. They held the title for 692 days, before losing them to Hiroyo Matsumoto and Misaki Ohata on March 26, 2011. On October 2, the Ninjas failed in their attempt to win back the championship, losing to Ayumi Kurihara and Ayako Hamada. In March 2012, at the tapings of Volume 48, The NINJAs participated in a four-way elimination tag team match, but were the final team eliminated by Courtney Rush and Sara Del Rey, who won the Shimmer Tag Team Championship. On July 7, Perez and Matthews defeated Rush and Del Rey at an NCW Femmes Fatales (NCW FF) event to win the Shimmer Tag Team Championship for the second time. They lost the title to the Global Green Gangsters (Kellie Skater and Tomoka Nakagawa) on April 14, 2013, at the tapings of Volume 57.

=== Other North American promotions ===
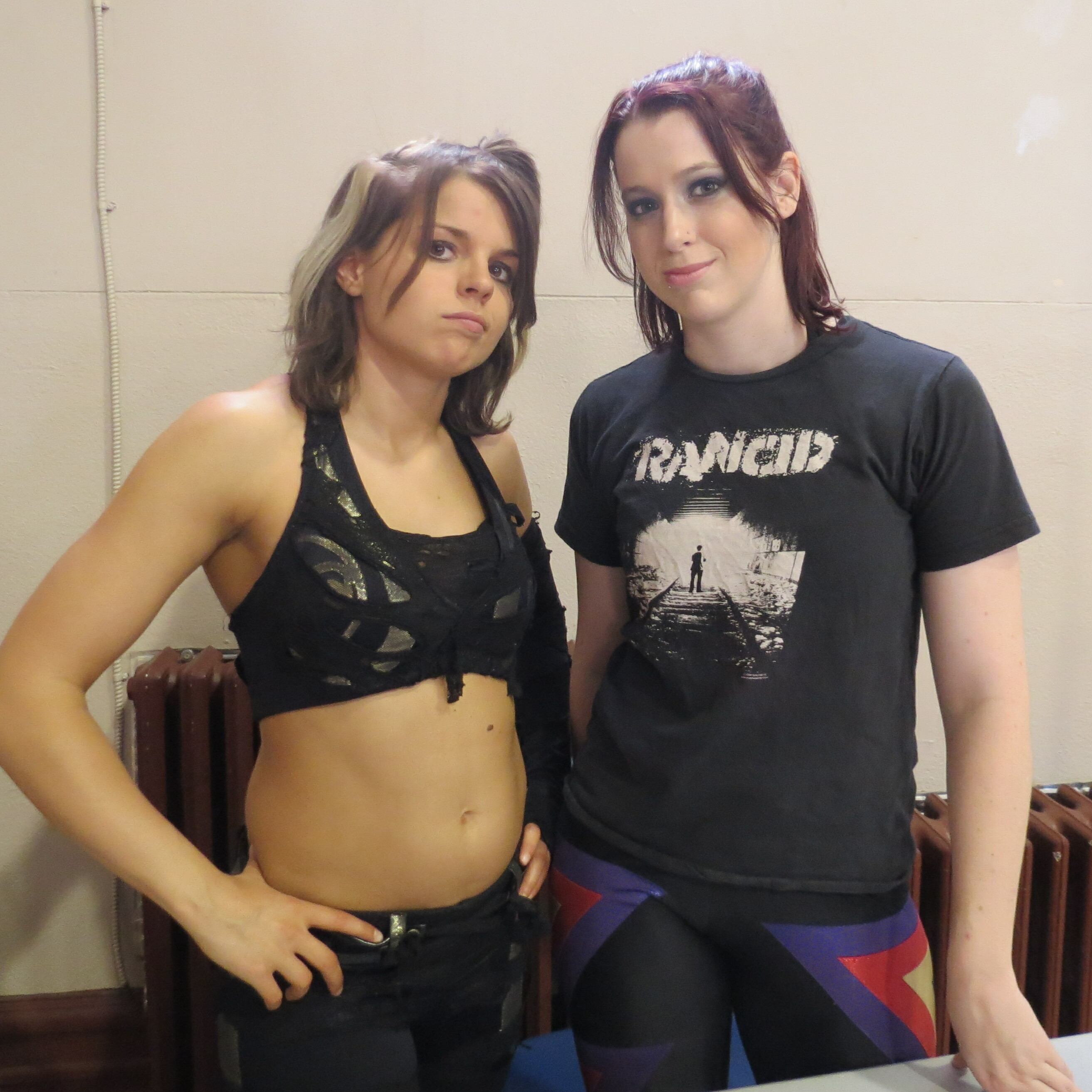
Perez (left) and Nicole Matthews (right) in 2012. The pair tagged together as "the Canadian NINJAS" for many years

On December 15, 2008 Perez was defeated by Angelina Love in a dark match for TNA Wrestling. On January 10, 2009, Perez made her Jersey All Pro Wrestling debut defeating Jennifer Blake. On August 1, she unsuccessfully challenged the JAPW Women's Champion Sara Del Rey for her title. The following year, on January 9, Perez and Mia Yim lost to The Addiction (Angeldust and Brittney Force).

In Anarchy Championship Wrestling (ACW), Perez defeated Rachel Summerlyn to be crowned the first ACW American Joshi Champion on August 23. On January 17, 2010, at Guilty By Association, Perez lost the American Joshi Championship to Summerlyn. On June 27, Perez was crowned the 2010 ACW Queen of Queens and also captured the ACW American Joshi title for the second time. On November 12, 2011, Perez won the ACW Heavyweight Championship in the first round of the 2011 Lone Star Classic, defeating former champion Darin Childs and Summerlyn in a three-way. Perez lost the title on the same night, as she was defeated in the semi-final of the tournament by JT LaMotta, due to interference by Robert Evans.

In early 2009, Grattan took part in the first season tapings of Wrestlicious, which began airing in March 2010. In the promotion she appears as "Faith" and teams with regular partner Nicole Matthews, who portrays "Hope". She debuted on the fifth episode on March 31, teaming with Hope in a losing effort against the team of Charlotte and Paige Webb.

Perez defeated Kylie Pierce at the debut show of NCW Femmes Fatales in September 2009 by cheating. At the following show, on February 5, 2010, she was defeated by Mercedes Martinez. Due to being one-half of the SHIMMER Tag Team Champions she entered the tournament to determine the first NXW Femmes Fatales Champion and in the first round she defeated PJ Tyler.

=== International excursions ===
In January 2006, Portia took part in her first international tour, spending four weeks in Ireland's Irish Whip Wrestling and England's All Star Wrestling. Perez made her Mexican wrestling debut in June 2006 as a masked competitor named Xtasis. She spent three weeks competing for Lucha Libre Feminil as well as appearing for Lucha Libre AAA World Wide (AAA). Perez returned to Europe in November 2006, touring once again with Irish Whip Wrestling. During her trip, Perez took part in the Queens of Chaos 2 tournament in Paris, France and also debuted for Real Quality Wrestling in London's York Hall, challenging RQW Women's Champion "Jezebel" Eden Black. She returned to Europe for a third time in April 2007, wrestling shows in England and Ireland over the course of four weeks.

On September 23, 2011, Perez made her Japanese debut for the Universal Woman's Pro Wrestling Reina promotion, when she and Nicole Matthews entered the Reina World Tag Team Championship tournament, defeating Mia Yim and Sara Del Rey in their first round match. The following day, Perez and Matthews were defeated in the finals of the tournament by La Comandante and Zeuxis. Perez returned to Japan on January 14, 2013, to work for the World Wonder Ring Stardom promotion. For the appearance, Perez teamed up with Kellie Skater and Tomoka Nakagawa as "Team Shimmer" in the Artist of Stardom Championship tournament, defeating Planet (Io Shirai, Mayu Iwatani, and Natsumi Showzuki) in their first-round match. Later that same day however, the trio were defeated in the final of the tournament by Kawasaki Katsushika Saikyou Densetsu Plus One (Act Yasukawa, Natsuki☆Taiyo, and Saki Kashima). On January 19, Perez defeated Natsumi Showzuki in a singles match at another Stardom event. The following day, Perez, in her final match of the tour, teamed with Skater in a tag team match, which they lost to Hiroyo Matsumoto and Yuzuki Aikawa.

=== Retirement ===
On October 10, 2015, Perez announced she would be forced to retire from professional wrestling due to a major neck injury that required surgery. She wrestled her final match at the following day's Shimmer tapings, where she, Nicole Matthews, Kimber Lee and Lacey were defeated by Daizee Haze, Kellie Skater, Lexie Fyfe and Madison Eagles.

== Championships and accomplishments ==
- Anarchy Championship Wrestling
  - ACW Heavyweight Championship (1 time)
  - ACW American Joshi Championship (2 times)
  - American Joshi Queen of Queens (2010)
- Great Canadian Wrestling
  - GCW W.I.L.D. Championship (1 time)
- Main Event Wrestling
  - MEW Women's Championship (1 time)
- New Horizon Pro Wrestling
  - Global Conflict Shield Tournament (201
- Pro Wrestling Illustrated
  - Ranked No. 25 of the top 50 female wrestlers in the PWI Female 50 in 2010
- Shimmer Women Athletes
  - Shimmer Tag Team Championship (2 times) – with Nicole Matthews
- Squared Circle Wrestling
  - 2CW Tag Team Championship (1 time) – with Jason Axe
