= Laura Di Matteo =

Italian professional wrestler (born 1991)

Personal information
- Born: July 17, 1991 (age 35) San Benedetto del Tronto

Professional wrestling career
- Ring name(s): Laura Di Matteo; Elizabeth
- Billed weight: 55 kg (121 lb)
- Trained by: Jimmy Havoc
- Debut: 2015

Laura Di Matteo (born 17 July 1991) is an Italian former professional wrestler best known for her tenure with British promotions Pro-Wrestling: EVE and Progress Wrestling. She is also known for her tenures with various promotions from the European independent scene.

== Professional wrestling career ==
=== European independent circuit (2015–2025) ===
Di Matteo is known for her work in various promotions of the European independent scene. She briefly worked for companies such as British Empire Wrestling, Bodyslam! Wrestling, International Pro Wrestling: United Kingdom, German Wrestling Federation or Defiant Wrestling. She shared a stint tenure with Revolution Pro Wrestling. At RevPro No Escape on February 27, 2022, Di Matteo teamed up with Hyan in a losing effort against The Hex (Allysin Kay and Marti Belle). She competed in one of the promotion's women-only tournaments, the 2019 Queen of The Ring, where she fell short to Chardonnay in the first rounds. At Westside Xtreme Wrestling's 2017 edition of the Femmes Fatales tournament, Di Matteo defeated Killer Kelly in the first rounds and fell short to Viper in the semifinals.

=== Progress Wrestling (2015–2022) ===
Di Matteo made her professional wrestling debut in Progress Wrestling under the ring name of "Elizabeth" at ENDVR 9, an event promoted on March 1, 2015, where she teamed up with Jinny in a losing effort against Pollyanna and Mischa East.

During her time in the company, she competed in various of its signature events. One of them is the Natural Progression Series in which she made her debut at the fourth edition from 2017 where she defeated Chakara in the first rounds, Alex Windsor in the semifinals and fell short to Toni Storm and Jinny in a three-way match in the finals from PROGRESS Chapter 49 on May 28, 2017, which were also contested for the inaugural Progress Wrestling World Women's Championship. She competed in the Revelations Of Divine Love tournament in 2021 in which she fell short to Skye Smitson in the first rounds.

=== Pro-Wrestling: EVE (2016–2024) ===
Di Matteo made her debut in Pro-Wrestling: EVE at EVE Never Mind The Bollocks, Here's Pro-Wrestling: EVE on November 26, 2016, where she defeated Shanna in singles competition. During her time in the promotion, she competed in various signature events promoted by it. One of them is the SHE-1 tournament in which she scored her best result at the 2017 edition where she placed herself in the C block, scoring a total of tying four points with Jamie Hayter and Sammii Jayne. Di Matteo later lost the playoff match for the finals against Hayter and Jayne. Di Matteo is a former EVE International Championship, title which she won at Slayers in Spandex 2 on February 5, 2022, after she defeated Alex Windsor for the vacant title. She lost the title at EVE Wrestle Queendom 5 on November 13, 2022, against Yuu in a match which was also contested for the latter's Pure-J Openweight Championship. She is also a former EVE Tag Team Championship, title which she won alongside Rayne Leverkusen as "The Rock and Rome Express" at EVE 100 on January 7, 2023, by defeating reigning champions Medusa Complex (Charli Evans and Millie McKenzie). Chantal Jordan filled in for an injured Evans in the match. At EVE Wrestle Queendom 4 on August 27, 2021, Di Matteo competed in a rumble match for the Pro-Wrestling: EVE Championship, bout won by Jetta and also involving various other notable opponents such as Rhia O'Reilly, Erin Angel, Zoe Lucas, Lana Austin and many others.

==== NXT UK (2021) ====
Due to being a developmental talent enhanced by Progress, Di Matteo competed in several matches of WWE's NXT UK brand. She made her first appearance at WWE NXT UK #150 on June 24, 2021, where she fell short to Stevie Turner in singles competition. At WWE NXT UK #152 on July 8, 2021, she fell short to Blair Davenport. Di Matteo made her last appearance for the brand at the WWE NXT UK #154 episode from July 22, 2021, where she fell short to Nina Samuels.

== Personal life ==
Di Matteo came out as gay via Twitter during the 2018 pride month. In 2019, she cited Io Shirai as one of her dream opponents.

== Championships and accomplishments ==
- German Wrestling Federation
  - GWF Women's World Championship (1 time)
- Hustle Wrestling
  - Hustle World Championship (1 time)
- Independent Wrestling Federation
  - IWF Women's Championship (1 time)
- Pro-Wrestling: EVE
  - Pro-Wrestling: EVE International Championship (1 time)
  - Pro-Wrestling: EVE Tag Team Championship (1 time) – with Rayne Leverkusen
- Pro Wrestling Illustrated
  - Ranked No. 73 of the top 150 female singles wrestlers in the PWI Women's 150 in 2022
