= Leva Bates =

American professional wrestler (born 1983)

- Bates in 2023

Personal information
- Born: Leva Kay Bates; May 21, 1983 (age 43) Madisonville, Kentucky, U.S.
- Education: Murray State University
- Website: levabates.com

Professional wrestling career
- Ring name(s): Leanna Hyde; Leva; Leva Bates; Baby Cakes Dejo; Bimbo; Emo Leigh; Blue Pants
- Billed height: 5 ft 2 in (157 cm)
- Billed weight: 115 lb (52 kg)
- Billed from: "Gotham City, Florida" "The Clearance Rack" (as Blue Pants); Fairvale, California (as "The Librarian")
- Trained by: Bubba Ray Dudley; D-Von Dudley
- Debut: 2006

Leva Bates (/ˈliːvə/ LEE-və,) (born May 21, 1983) is an American professional wrestler. She is best known for her time with All Elite Wrestling. She also had a successful tenure on the independent circuit, most notably for Shimmer Women Athletes. She has also appeared in WWE on their developmental territory NXT under the ring name Blue Pants.

== Professional wrestling career ==
=== Early career (2006–2009) ===
Leva Bates was trained at the Team 3D Academy under D-Von Dudley and Bubba Ray Dudley (The Dudley Boyz), and made her professional wrestling debut in 2006. She spent the next three years wrestling primarily in the Southeastern United States, for promotions such as Southeastern Championship Wrestling (SCW) and Coastal Championship Wrestling. In SCW, she won the SCW Women's Championship on November 8, 2008, by defeating Betsy Ruth and Lexie Fyfe in a three-way match. She also appeared for World Xtreme Wrestling, beginning in 2009, wrestling against Betsy Ruth and Malia Hosaka, among others.

=== Shimmer Women Athletes (2009–2019) ===
Bates debuted for Shimmer Women Athletes in 2009 at Volume 28, when she and Kimberly Kash lost a tag team match to Kacey Diamond and Sassy Stephie. She returned at the next show in 2010, defeating She Nay Nay in a dark match, before losing to Malia Hosaka on Volume 30. At Volumes 33 and 34, she lost to Allison Danger and Melanie Cruise respectively, before defeating Cat Power at Volume 36. Beginning at Volume 37 in March 2011, Bates formed a tag team with Allison Danger, known as Regeneration X. Over the next year, they defeated the teams of Jamilia Craft and Mia Yim, and Sassy Stephie and Nevaeh, but lost to Nikki Roxx and Ariel and The Knight Dynasty (Britani and Saraya Knight). On March 17, 2012, Regeneration X failed to win the Shimmer Tag Team Championship from Ayako Hamada and Ayumi Kurihara, and were unsuccessful again in a four-way match at Volume 48 the next day. In 2013, Bates returned to singles competition, and unsuccessfully challenged Cheerleader Melissa for the Shimmer Championship on October 19 at Volume 58. She spent the rest of 2013 and 2014 wrestling matches against Nikki Storm, Marti Belle, Veda Scott, and Jessicka Havok.

=== Shine Wrestling (2012–2019) ===
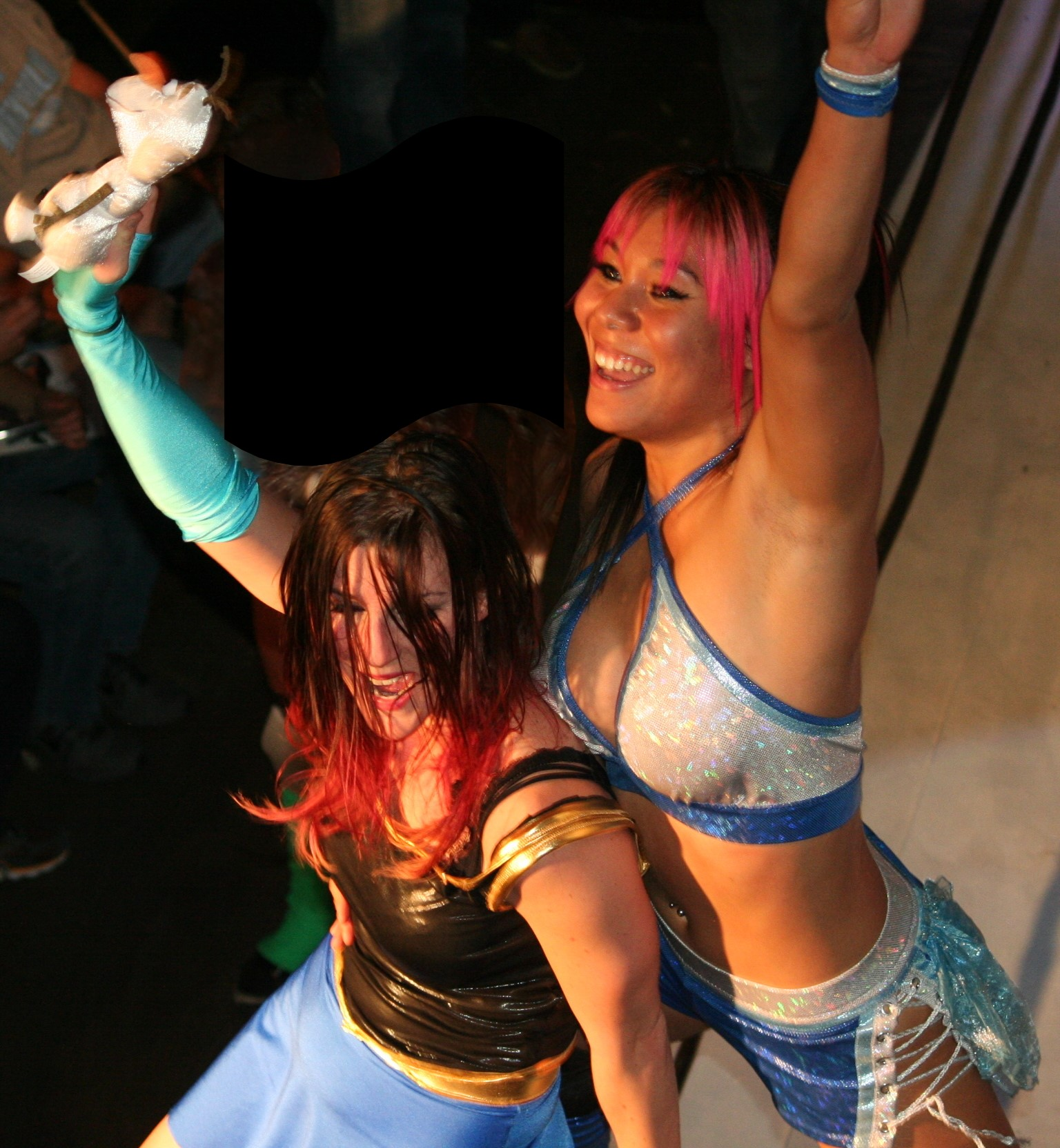
The Lucha Sisters (Bates, left, and Mia Yim) in November 2014

Bates debuted in Shine Wrestling at their first event in July 2012. Initially a singles competitor, she faced Mercedes Martinez, Portia Perez, and Jessicka Havok, before having a series of matches with Kimberly, with the pair trading wins. This prompted at a Last Woman Standing match at Shine 7, which Bates won. After being attacked post-match by Kimberly, they faced off again at Shine 8 in a Fans Bring the Weapons I Quit match, which Kimberly won by referee stoppage. The feud ended at Shine 9, when Bates won an "Arkham Asylum" steel cage match. Bates then competed in the tournament to determine the inaugural Shine Champion; she defeated Taylor Made before losing to Mia Yim. This was followed by a feud with Nevaeh, which culminated in a hardcore match at Shine 15 won by Bates.

In February 2014, Bates teamed with Mia Yim to enter the tournament to determine the inaugural Shine Tag Team Champions. Collectively known as The Lucha Sisters, Bates and Yim defeated The Kimber Bombs (Cherry Bomb and Kimber Lee) and Jessie Belle Smothers and Sassy Stephie en route to the final, where they defeated Made in Sin (Taylor Made and Allysin Kay) to win the championship. They successfully defended the title against Evie and Madison Eagles, and Candice LeRae and Ivelisse, before losing to Legendary (Brandi Wine and Malia Hosaka) at Shine 20 on June 27, 2014. The Lucha Sisters failed to regain the championship in a rematch at Shine 21 in August. Bates then transitioned back in singles competition, and unsuccessfully challenged LuFisto for the Shine Championship in 2017.

=== WWE (2014–2015) ===
Bates first appeared in WWE, accompanying Adam Rose as one of his "Rosebuds". Bates made her debut in WWE's developmental territory on the October 16, 2014, episode of NXT, as an enhancement talent, losing to the debuting Carmella. She was introduced as "Blue Pants" by Enzo Amore and Colin Cassady because of her blue ring attire, and retained the name for her subsequent appearances. She returned at the NXT television tapings on October 23, losing again to Carmella; the match aired on November 27. Blue Pants earned her first victory on the January 1, 2015, episode of NXT, defeating Carmella in their third match. She made further appearances on the February 18, April 15, and June 10 episodes, losing to NXT Women's Champion Sasha Banks, Dana Brooke, and Emma respectively. Blue Pants made a surprise appearance at NXT TakeOver: Brooklyn on August 22, managing The Vaudevillains (Aiden English and Simon Gotch) to a NXT Tag Team Championship. During the match, she had an altercation with Alexa Bliss, prompting a match on the September 2 episode of NXT, which Bliss won. Blue Pants made her final appearance on the December 2 episode of NXT, facing Nia Jax in a losing effort.

Bates described the character of Blue Pants as the "ultimate fangirl", and felt the character became so popular because the audience connected with the joy the character felt in wrestling. Blue Pants was noted to be very popular with the crowd at NXT shows, receiving enthusiastic applause and cheering when she appeared, despite being intended initially only as an enhancement talent and not being under contract with WWE.

=== Other promotions (2008–2019) ===
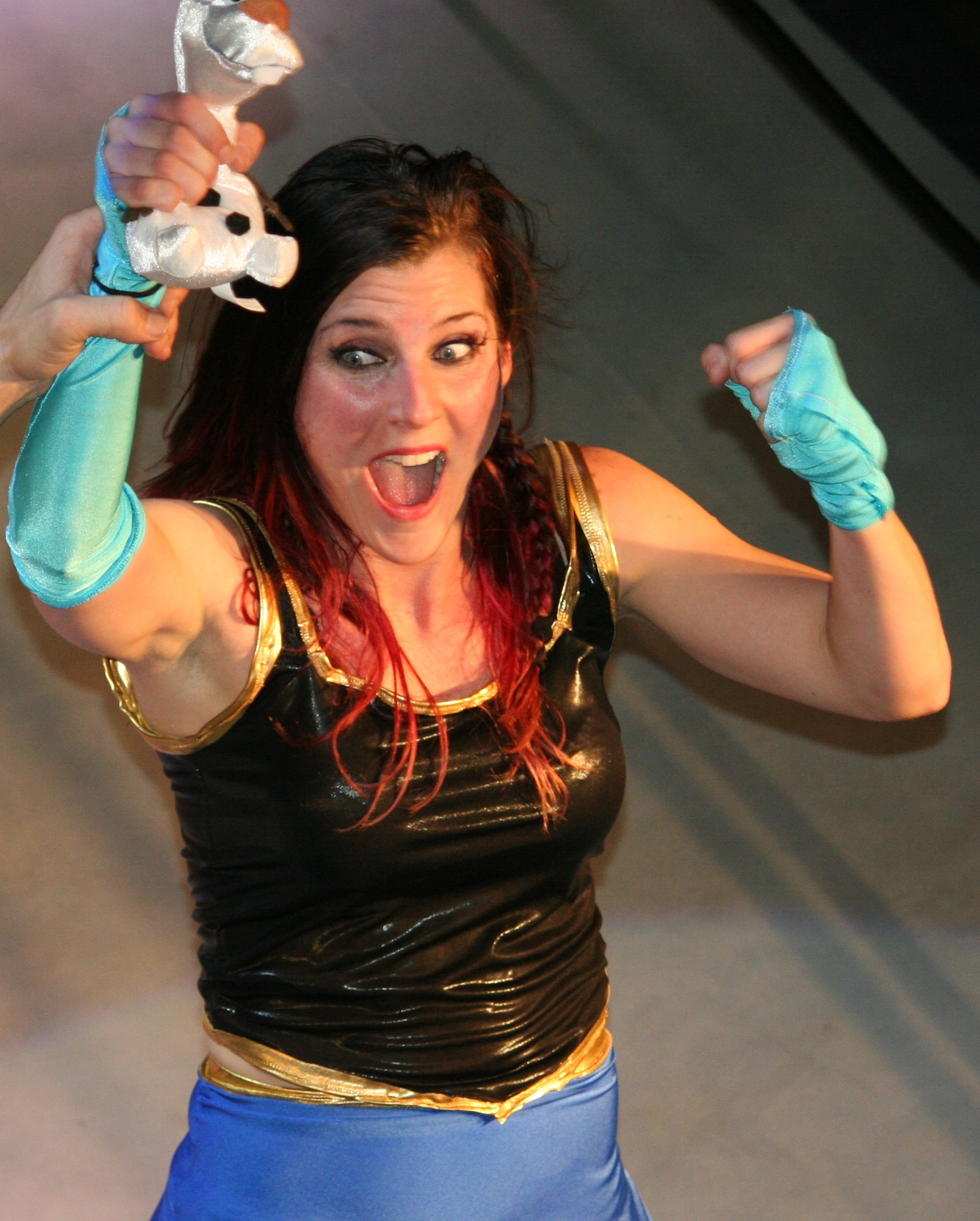
Bates in 2014, wearing Frozen-inspired attire

Bates appeared on the May 28, 2008, episode of Total Nonstop Action Wrestling's Impact!, accepting Awesome Kong's $25,000 challenge, which she would lose. She later had a try-out match for the company against Isis the Amazon in February 2011, but lost the match. In September 2012, Bates made a further appearance on Impact Wrestling, portraying a villainous stagehand who helped the Aces & Eights faction abduct Sting and Hulk Hogan. Bates made a brief return to TNA for the Knockouts Knockdown 2016 pay-per-view as her cosplayer character losing a well received match to TNA Knockouts champion Jade. Bates returned to Impact Wrestling again for One Night Only: Victory Road – Knockouts Knockdown defeating Allie. Later the same night she teamed with ODB, Alisha, and Santana Garrett in an eight-man tag team match where they defeated Angelina Love, Rosemary, Diamanté, and Laurel Van Ness.

Bates debuted in Full Impact Pro (FIP) in May 2008, when she and Rain defeated Portia Perez and Mimi in a tag team match. She returned five years later, as part of a Shine Wrestling showcase match against Solo Darling on August 9, 2013. She continued making appearances for FIP throughout 2013 and 2014, as the manager of Dos Ben Dejos (Jay Rios and Eddie Cruz), along with Mia Yim. She also made sporadic wrestling appearances for the company, usually against Darling or Su Yung.

=== All Elite Wrestling (2019–2023) ===
On April 22, 2019, it was announced that Bates would join the women's roster of All Elite Wrestling as The Librarian. She debuted at Fyter Fest, losing to Allie in a singles match after a superkick. She turned face after slapping Peter Avalon as part of an ongoing story between himself and Brandon Cutler. On May 1, 2023, Bates announced that after four years of working for AEW, her contract with the company had expired. She was under contract in a wrestling role and a backstage role, where she originally assisted former Chief Brand Officer Brandi Rhodes, but eventually took over many roles, most notably with her work on the AEW Heels fan club alongside AEW referee Aubrey Edwards and Amanda Huber.

== Other media ==
Leva Bates

Twitch information
- Channel: wrestlingleva
- Years active: 2015–present
- Genre: Gaming
- Followers: 25.2 thousand
- Last updated: August 4, 2025

Bates has been a livestreamer on Twitch since 2016. She is a Twitch Partner as well.

In 2023, Bates took part in the Netflix reality show, Squid Game: The Challenge, where she was eliminated in the first round, "Red Light, Green Light".

== Personal life ==
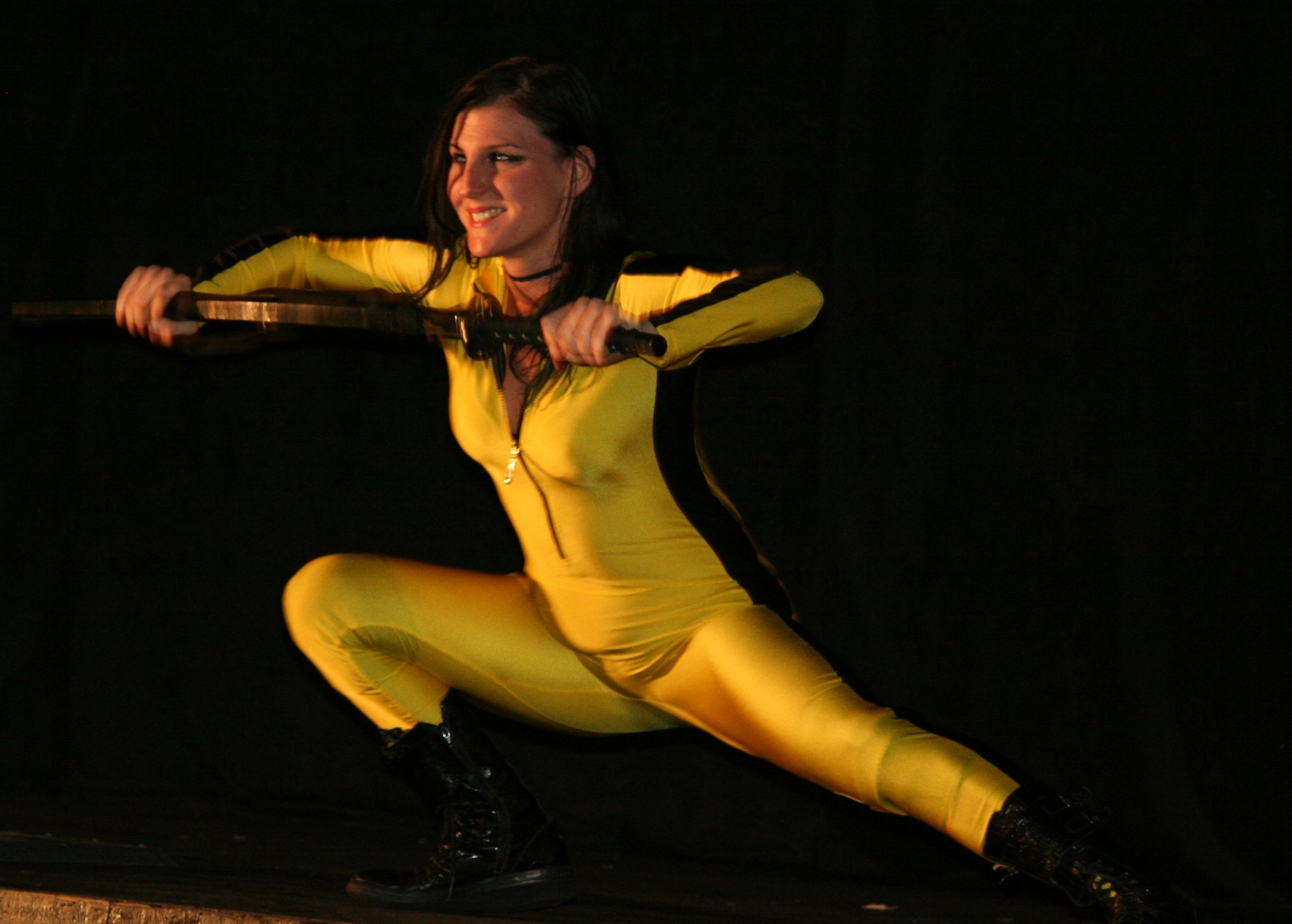
Bates dressed as The Bride from Kill Bill in March 2014

Bates holds two bachelor's degrees in theater and radio and television production, with a minor in dance, from Murray State University. On October 17, 2024, she was recognized by Murray State University as one of their Outstanding Young Alumni in the Fine Arts. She also video blogs for The Geek Soapbox.

Bates is known for her use of cosplay in her ring outfits; she regularly dresses as characters from TV, movies, video games, and comic books. While cosplaying, she incorporates aspects of the character into her wrestling style.

== Championships and accomplishments ==
- Atomic Legacy Wrestling
  - ALW Women's Championship (4 times)
- All-Out Pro Wrestling
  - APW Women's Championship (1 time, Current)
- Coastal Championship Wrestling
  - CCW Women's Championship (1 time)
- Fantasy Super Cosplay Wrestling
  - FSCW Toxic Crusader Championship (5 times in total, 2 times as Jinx from League of Legends), and 3 times as Lucy MacLean from Fallout
- Heavy on Wrestling
  - HOW Women's Championship (1 time, inaugural)
- Murray State University
  - Outstanding Young Alumni in the Fine Arts (October 2024)
- Pennsylvania Premiere Wrestling
  - PPW Women's Championship (1 time)
- Pro Wrestling Illustrated
  - PWI Feud of the Year (2012) as part of Aces & Eights vs. TNA
  - Ranked No. 28 of the top 50 female wrestlers in the PWI Female 50 in 2015
- Shimmer Wrestling
  - Shimmer Tag Team Championship (1 time) – with Delilah Doom
- Shine Wrestling
  - Shine Tag Team Championship (1 time) – with Mia Yim
  - Shine Tag Team Title Tournament (2014)
- Southeastern Championship Wrestling
  - SCW Women's Championship (1 time)
- Southern Championship Wrestling Florida
  - SCW Florida Women's Championship (1 time)
- United States Championship Wrestling
  - USCW Women's Championship (1 time)
- Women Superstars Uncensored
  - WSU Spirit Championship (1 time)
  - WSU Spirit Championship Tournament (2015)
- WrestleCircus
  - WrestleCircus Sideshow Championship (1 time)
- World Wrestling Entertainment
  - Nxt Women's Championship (1 time)(unrecognized)
- Wrestling Observer Newsletter
  - Worst Gimmick (2012) Aces & Eights
