= Pro-Wrestling: EVE International Championship =

Women professional wrestling championship

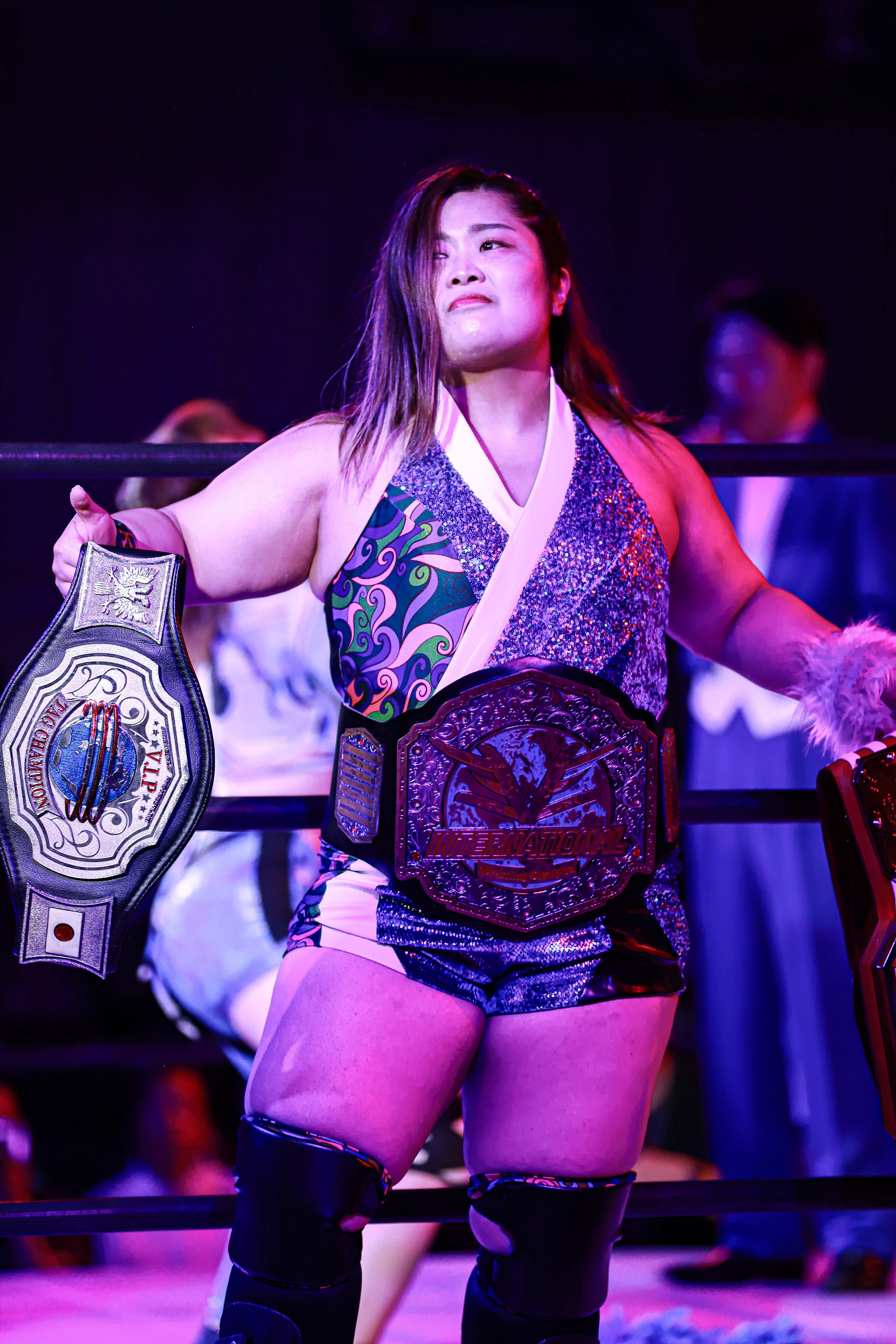
- Yuu with the original title design in 2023

Details
- Promotion: Pro-Wrestling: EVE
- Date established: 13 October 2018
- Current champion: Marina Shafir
- Date won: 8 November 2026
Statistics
- First champion: Viper
- Most reigns: All titleholders (1 reign)
- Longest reign: Yuu (789 days)
- Shortest reign: Skye Smitson (28 days)
- Oldest champion: Marina Shafir (38 years, 119 days)
- Youngest champion: Utami Hayashishita (20 years, 122 days)
- Heaviest champion: Yuu (209 lb (95 kg))
- Lightest champion: Kasey (125 lb (57 kg))

The Pro-Wrestling: EVE International Championship is a women's professional wrestling championship created and promoted by the British professional wrestling promotion Pro-Wrestling: EVE. On 13 October 2018, Viper became the inaugural champion after defeating Jordynne Grace, Kasey and Laura Di Matteo in a four-way elimination match to claim the inaugural title. Since then, there have been twelve reigns, all held by different wrestlers. The current champion is Marina Shafir, who is in her first reign; winning the title in November 2026.

== History ==
On 13 October 2018, Viper became the inaugural champion after defeating Jordynne Grace, Kasey, and Laura Di Matteo in a four-way elimination match to claim the inaugural title.

On 2 May 2025 at the Punkin' Instigators show, Anita Vaughan threw the International Championship belt in the trash. A new title belt was designed, and debuted on 6 June 2025 at Hit Me Baby One More Time. The 2025 championship belt features a changeable plate reflecting the nationality of the titleholder.

== Reigns ==
As of 22 November 2026, there have been a total of twelve reigns shared among twelve wrestlers. Viper was the inaugural champion. Marina Shafir is the oldest champion at 38 years old, while Utami Hayashishita is the youngest at 20 years old. Yuu has the longest reign, at 789 days, while Skye Smitson has the shortest, at 28 days.

Marina Shafir is the current champion in her first reign. She won the title by defeating previous champion Miyu Yamashita at EVE Elite Encounters II on 8 November 2026 in Wolverhampton, England.

Key
No.	Overall reign number
Reign	Reign number for the specific champion
Days	Number of days held
<1	Reign lasted less than a day
+	Current reign is changing daily

No.	Champion	Championship change			Reign statistics		Notes	Ref.
No.	Champion	Date	Event	Location	Reign	Days	Notes	Ref.
1	Viper	13 October 2018	Command Attention	Bethnal Green, Greater London	1	93	Viper defeated Jordynne Grace, Kasey and Laura Di Matteo in a tournament final four-way elimination match to become the inaugural champion.	
2	Utami Hayashishita	14 January 2019	Stardom 8th Anniversary	Tokyo, Japan	1	167	Viper also defended the SWA World Championship in this match.	
3	Jamie Hayter	30 June 2019	Wrestle Queendom 2	Bethnal Green, Greater London	1	216	This was a three-way elimination match, also involving Nina Samuels.	
4	Emersyn Jayne	1 February 2020	Reign After Queendom	Bethnal Green, Greater London	1	35	This was a four-way match, also involving Nina Samuels and Skye Smitson.	
5	Kasey	7 March 2020	Women Behaving Badly	Bethnal Green, Greater London	1	683		
—	Vacated	19 January 2022	—	—	—	—	EVE announced that Kasey would be unable to defend the title within the allocated 90-day period.	
6	Laura Di Matteo	5 February 2022	Slayers in Spandex 2	London, England	1	281	Defeated Alex Windsor to win the vacant title.	
7	Yuu	13 November 2022	Wrestle Queendom 5	London, England	1	789	This was a Winner Takes All match, also for Yuu's Pure-J Openweight Championship.	
8	Nina Samuels	10 January 2025	Wrestle Queendom 7	London, England	1	56	Samuels and Yuu entered the Winner Takes All SHE-1 tournament as champions. Samuels, as the tournament winner, emerged with both of the EVE singles titles.	
9	Skye Smitson	7 March 2025	Women Behaving Badly	London, England	1	28	Smitson won the International Championship in the second fall of a two-falls three-way match after Nina Samuels had already retained the EVE Championship in the first fall.	
10	Anita Vaughan	4 April 2025	Wrestle [Wo]mania	London, England	1	91		
11	Kris Statlander	4 July 2025	Mean Grrrls	London, England	1	336		
12	Miyu Yamashita	5 June 2026	History Makers / Rule Breakers	Walthamstow, Greater London	1	156		
13	Marina Shafir	8 November 2026	Elite Encounters II	Wolverhampton, England	1	14+		

== Combined reigns ==
As of November 22, 2026.

†	Indicates the current champion

Rank	Wrestler	No. of reigns	Combined days
1	Yuu	1	789
2	Kasey	1	683
3	Kris Statlander	1	336
4	Laura Di Matteo	1	281
5	Jamie Hayter	1	216
6	Utami Hayashishita	1	167
7	Miyu Yamashita	1	156
8	Viper	1	93
9	Anita Vaughan	1	91
10	Nina Samuels	1	56
11	Emersyn Jayne	1	35
12	Skye Smitson	1	28
13	Marina Shafir †	1	14+
