= Allysin Kay =

American professional wrestler (born 1987)

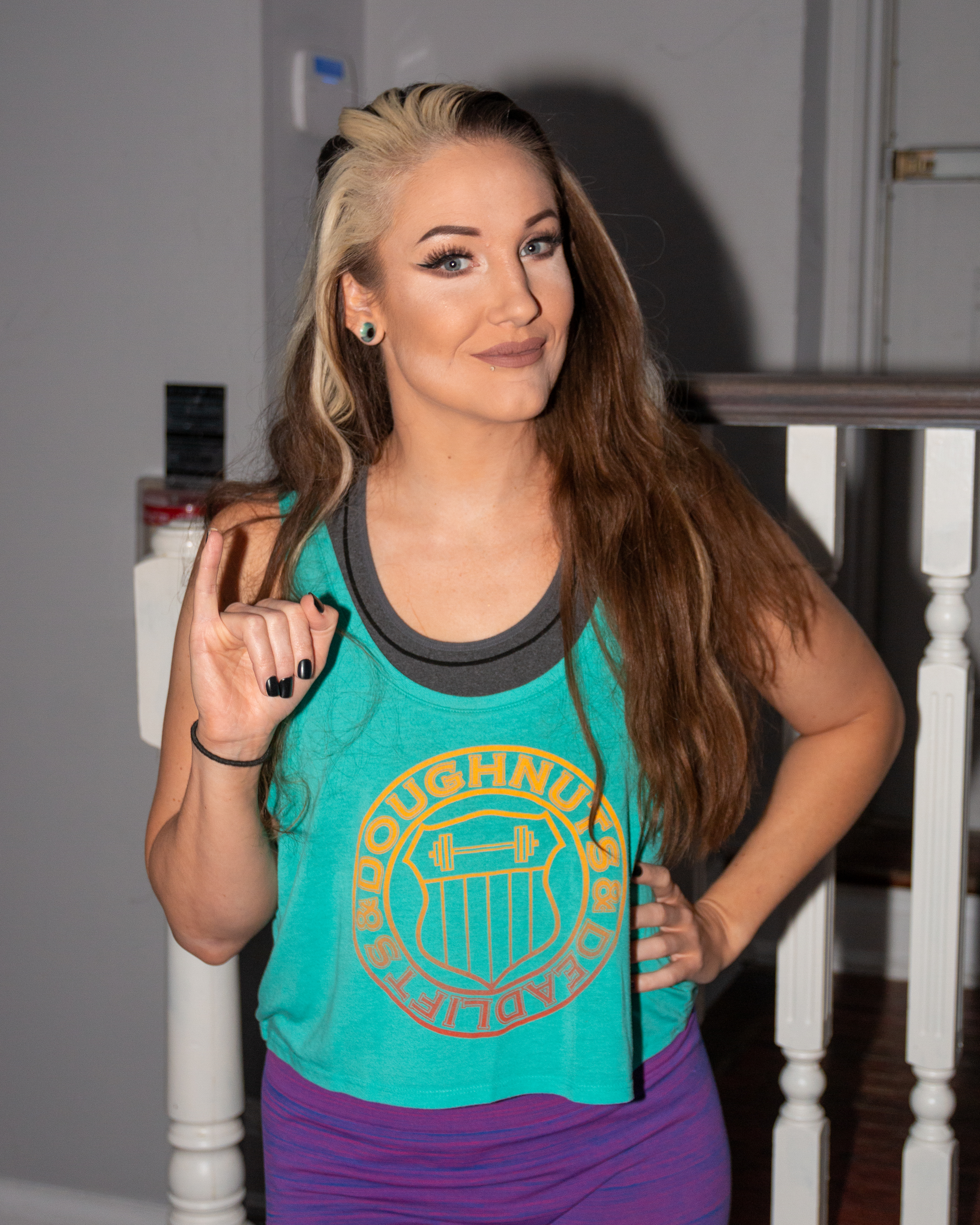
- Allysin Kay in August 2019

Personal information
- Born: November 5, 1987 (age 39) Detroit, Michigan, U.S.

Professional wrestling career
- Ring name(s): Allysin Kay; Beth Moore; Sienna; Maria Maria
- Billed height: 5 ft 10 in (1.78 m)
- Billed weight: 150 lb (68 kg)
- Billed from: Detroit, Michigan
- Trained by: Mathew Priest & Bill Martel
- Debut: December 28, 2008

Allysin Kay (born November 5, 1987) is an American professional wrestler. She is best known for her time with the National Wrestling Alliance (NWA), where she is a one-time NWA World Women's Champion and two-time NWA World Women's Tag Team champion. She has also worked for Impact Wrestling under the ring name Sienna, being a two-time TNA/Impact Knockouts Champion and one-time GFW Women's Champion. She also wrestles on the independent circuit in the United States and Canada.

== Professional wrestling career ==
=== Independent circuit (2008–present) ===
A fan of professional wrestling since her childhood, Kay first became involved in the wrestling business in July 2008 when she began training with Mathew Priest and Bill Martel at the Blue Collar Wrestling Alliance (BCWA) in her hometown of Detroit, Michigan. Six months later, she debuted against Shavonne Norrell on December 28. Kay and Norrell engaged in a feud that lasted most of 2009, including a Falls Count Anywhere match at Summer Standoff in August 2009. Kay later began competing against male wrestlers. At the end of 2010, the BCWA National Championship was vacated, and Kay entered the tournament to determine the new champion. She reached the semi-finals, where she lost to eventual victor Scotty Primo. Until BCWA's closure in mid-2011, Kay regularly attempted to win the championship.

Until March 2010, Kay worked exclusively for BCWA. Her first match for another promotion was facing Jefferson Saint for Beyond Wrestling.

In mid-2010, Kay began wrestling for Main Event Championship Wrestling. She debuted against Jessicka Havok, and the duo entered a feud which spilled over into other promotions, including Cleveland All-Pro Wrestling. The feud concluded in a two out of three falls anything goes street fight, which was won by Havok. Following the feud, Kay and Havok formed a tag team called Team Be Jealous.

Kay made her Shimmer Women Athletes debut on October 27, 2012, as part of Volume 49. She and Taylor Made, as Made in Sin, defeated Shazza McKenzie and Veda Scott. Made in Sin lost at Volume 51 in October 2012 to Regeneration X (Allison Danger and Leva Bates), and at Volume 52 to the team of Kana and LuFisto. At Volume 55, Kay defeated Thunderkitty in a singles match. Made in Sin defeated MsEerie (MsChif and Christina Von Eerie) at Volume 56, but were on the losing end of a six-woman tag team match at Volume 57.

Kay debuted for Ring of Honor (ROH) at the Ring of Honor Wrestling television tapings on November 3, 2012, in a loss to MsChif.

Under her 'Sienna' ring name, it was announced that she would be making her debut for the Lucha Libre AAA World Wide promotion by taking part in the 2016 Lucha Libre World Cup Women's Division Tournament. Kay was a part of 'Team USA' alongside Cheerleader Melissa and Santana Garrett, where they lost to Team Mexico (Faby Apache, Mari Apache and Lady Apache).

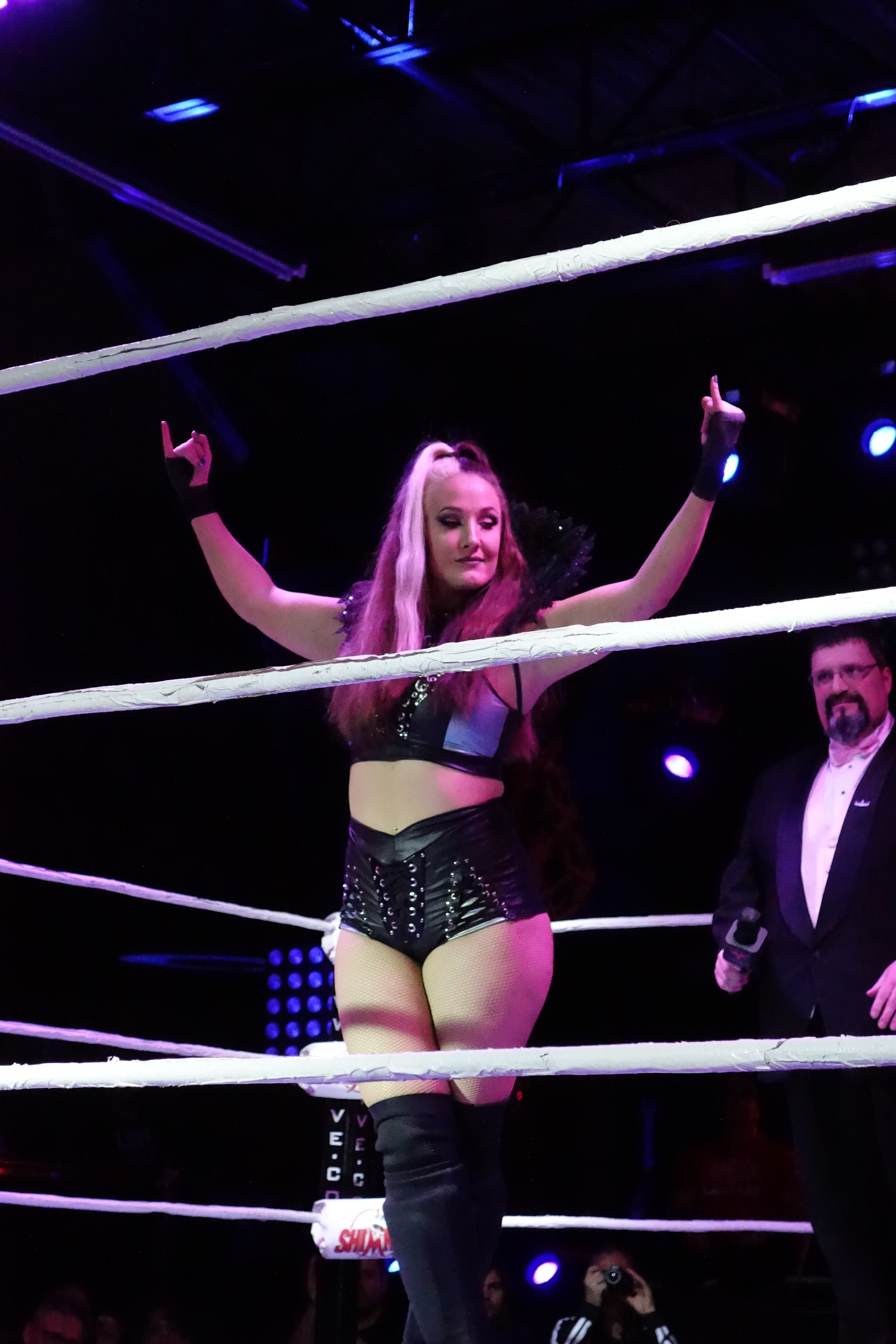
Kay working on a Shimmer event

=== Absolute Intense Wrestling (2010–2014) ===
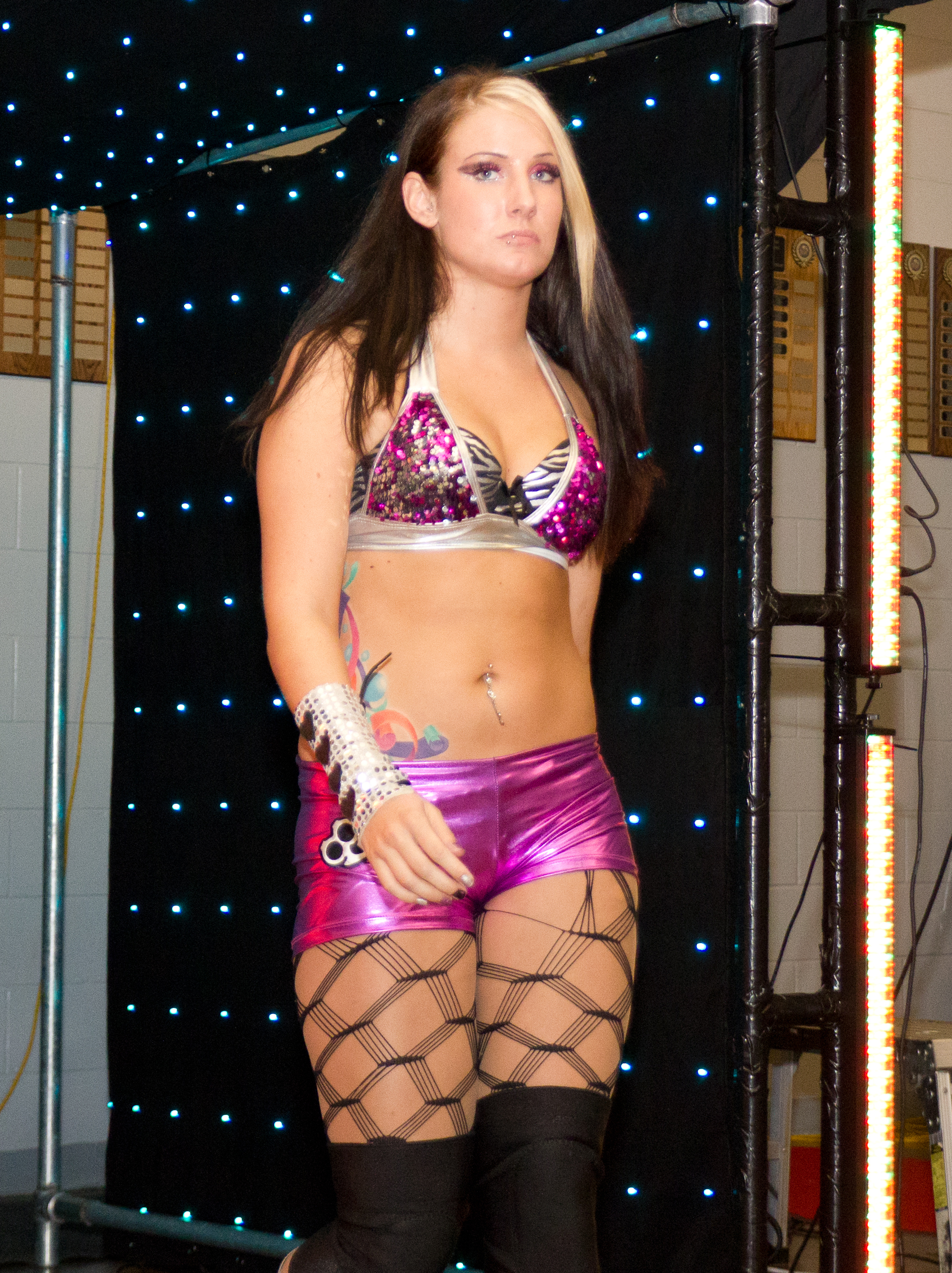
Sienna in 2011

Kay debuted in Absolute Intense Wrestling (AIW) in April 2010, losing to Jessicka Havok, and the following month, she lost to Angel Dust. At Girls Night Out 3 in January 2011, Kay earned her first victory in AIW, defeating Roxie Cotton. In June at Road to Absolution, she joined the Flexor Industries stable. At Girls Night Out 4, she defeated Mickie Knuckles. Kay lost to Mia Yim at Girls Night Out 5, in a match where Yim legitimately broke Kay's nose with a kick. At Girls Night Out 6 on April 15, 2012, Kay faced Yim for the vacant AIW Women's Championship, which Kay won. The third match of the series between the duo took place at Girls Night Out 7, where Kay retained her championship. Kay went on to defend her championship against Jennifer Blake, Crazy Mary Dobson, and KC Warfield throughout 2012. In 2013, Kay defeated Mickie Knuckles to retain the championship at Girls Night Out 8 in March, and successfully defended the championship against Veda Scott and MsChif in October and November, respectively. In March 2014, Kay retained the championship against Leah Von Dutch at Girls Night Out 11, but they lost the championship to Athena at Girls Night Out 12 on March 29 in a no disqualification, falls count anywhere match.

=== Women Superstars Uncensored (2011–2014) ===
In January 2011, Kay debuted for Women Superstars Uncensored (WSU) at The Final Chapter internet pay-per-view in a loss to Jamilia Craft. She returned to WSU two months later, losing to Kristin Astara at the 4th Anniversary Show. At the Uncensored Rumble internet pay-per-view in June, Kay was on the losing end of an eight-person tag team match, and also competed in the rumble match later that night. In August, Kay earned her first win in WSU when she was victorious in a four-way match against Marti Belle, Tina San Antonio, and Niya. Kay then joined forces with Jessicka Havok and Sassy Stephie, creating a new stable known as The Midwest Militia. Kay competed in tag team matches with other members of The Midwest Militia over the next few months, including winning a WarGames match against Team WSU (Mercedes Martinez, Alicia, and Brittney Savage) at the Breaking Barriers II internet pay-per-view in November. On March 3, 2012, Kay and Stephie won the WSU Tag Team Championship by defeating the Soul Sisters (Jana and Latasha). They successfully defended the championship against the teams of Alicia and Brittney Savage and the Soul Sisters in April.

As part of a talent exchange, The Midwest Militia began competing for the Canadian promotion NCW Femmes Fatales (NCWFF) in 2012. At NCWFF's ninth show in July 2012, the Midwest Militia defeated Courtney Rush, Xandra Bale, and Cat Power in a six-woman tag team match. At WSU's King and Queen of the Ring pay-per-view, they retained the championship against Marti Belle and Lexxus. On February 8, 2014, Kay and Stephie lost the WSU Tag Team Championship to Kimber Lee and Annie Social, when Havok, who was substituting for Kay, attacked Stephie during the match. On September 13, Kay unsuccessfully challenged LuFisto for the WSU Championship.

=== Shine Wrestling (2012–present) ===
Kay joined Shine Wrestling in 2012. She debuted on the inaugural show, forming a tag team with Taylor Made, and the duo defeated Tracy Taylor and Su Yung. April Hunter was later added to the alliance, with the trio calling themselves Made in Sin. At Shine 7, Made in Sin defeated Taylor, Yung, and Mia Yim in a six-woman tag team match. With the addition of Rain and Ivelisse Vélez, the stable became known as Valkyrie. At Shine 8, Valkyrie defeated Amazing Kong, Angelina Love, Christina Von Eerie, and Yim in an eight-woman tag team match. At Shine 10 in May 2013, Kay defeated Nikki Roxx in a qualifying match for the Shine Championship tournament. When Kay interfered in the main event match between ally Rain and Love, she was suspended by Lexie Fyfe for 90 days and removed from the tournament. Kay returned at Shine 13 on September 27, teaming with Ivelisse to defeat Jessicka Havok and Kong, after accidentally clotheslining long-time ally Havok. On the following show, Kay attacked Havok, leading to a singles match at Shine 15, which ended in a no contest. After their next match ended in a double count out, Kay and Havok faced off in a Ybor City street fight in April 2014, which ended in a no-contest when Havok was struck by a car as part of the storyline. The rivalry between Kay and Havok culminated in Last Woman Standing match at Shine 20, which Kay won. At Shine 30 on October 2, 2015, Kay defeated Saraya Knight in an anything goes match.

At Shine 53, on September 8, 2018, Kay Defeated Mercedes Martinez in a tournament final to win the vacant Shine Championship. During her reign, Kay was able to retain her title against various competitors such as Ivelisse, LuFisto and Yung. On WWN Supershow Mercury Rising 2019, Kay lost her championship to Miyu Yamashita in a title vs. title as Yamashita defended her Tokyo Princess of Princess Championship as well. On May 6, Kay won the championship for the second time, after she defeated Yamashita on Tokyo Joshi Pro. On December 13, at Shine 63, Kay lost the championship to Martinez in a title vs. career match.

=== Japan and Europe (2013, 2014) ===
On July 7, 2013, Kay started her first tour of Japan with the World Woman Pro-Wrestling Diana promotion, losing to Keiko Aono in a singles match in Kawasaki. On August 4, Kay and Crazy Mary Dobson unsuccessfully challenged Aono and Yumiko Hotta for the WWWD World Tag Team Championship.

On September 28, 2014, Kay made her European debut with the British company Bellatrix Female Warriors, owned by Sweet Saraya, in a losing effort to Bellatrix World Champion, Liberty.

=== Total Nonstop Action / Impact Wrestling ===
==== The Lady Squad (2016–2017) ====
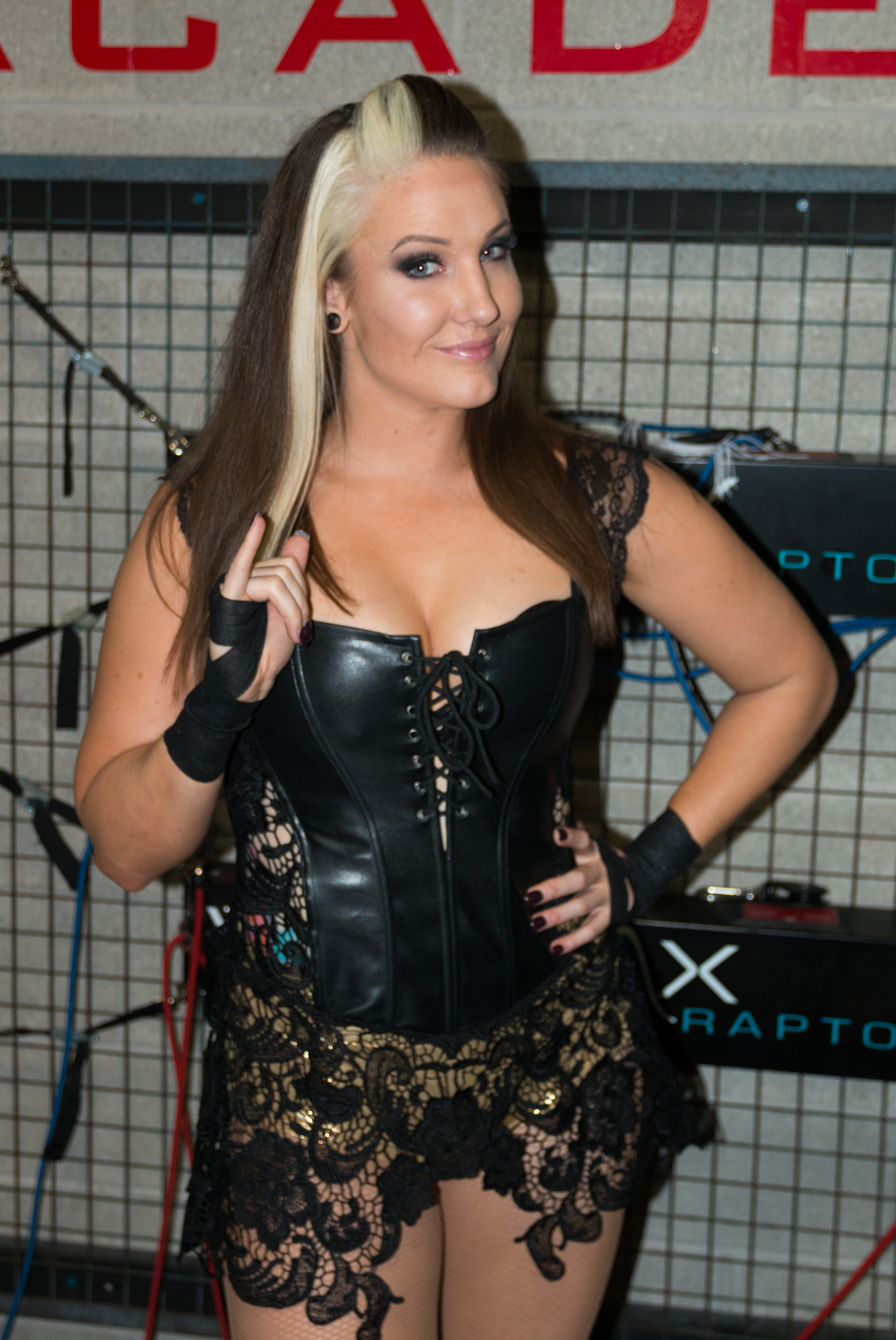
Sienna in August 2016

On April 21, 2016, it was reported that Kay had signed with Total Nonstop Action Wrestling (TNA). She made her debut for the promotion, on the same day, during the May tapings of Impact Wrestling, working under the ring name Sienna, by attacking Jade. She then engaged in a feud with both Gail Kim and Jade by joining an alliance with Maria and Allie, establishing herself as a villainess. On the April 24 tapings of Impact Wrestling, Sienna defeated Madison Rayne to become number one contender and face Jade for the TNA Knockouts Championship at Slammiversary On the May 17 episode of Impact Wrestling, Sienna defeated Velvet Sky with Sky's job on the line. She then lost to Gail Kim, after the match, Sienna and Maria assaulted Kim. On the May 31 episode of Impact Wrestling, Sienna and Allie were defeated by Kim and Jade in a tag-team match. At Slammiversary, Sienna captured the TNA Knockouts Championship defeating Jade and Gail Kim after Marti Bell returned and attacked Jade. On August 25, 2016, in Turning Point Sienna lost the TNA Knockouts Championship against Allie in a Five–Way Match, also involving Madison Rayne, Marti Bell, and Jade. Aligned with Maria and Laurel Van Ness, she often attacked Gail Kim.

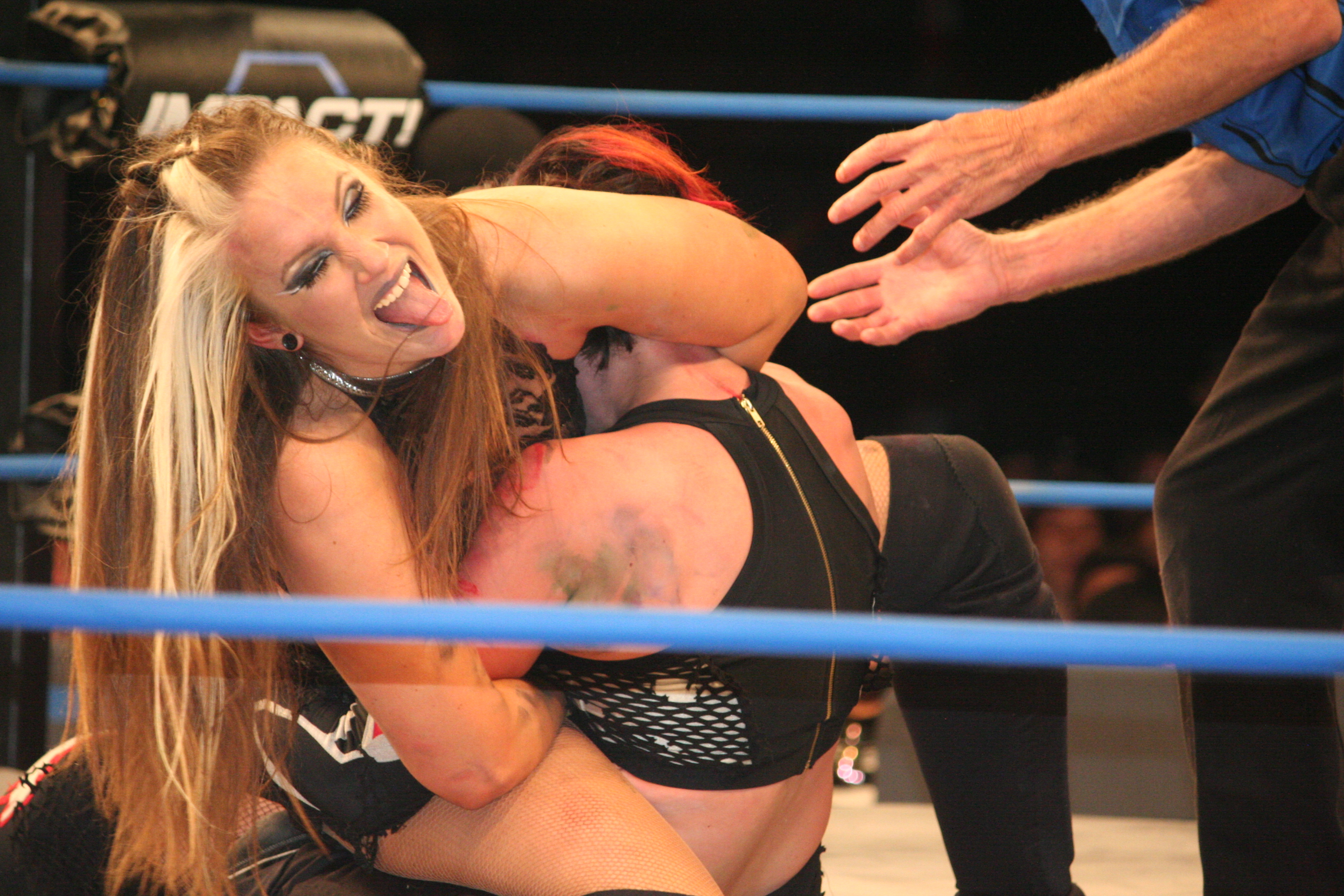
Allysin Kay wrestling Rosemary in 2016.

==== Knockouts Champion and departure (2017–2018) ====
On January 6, 2017, at the event One Night Only: Live!, Sienna unsuccessfully challenged Rosemary for the TNA Knockouts Championship. The following week on Impact Wrestling, The Lady Squad was ended after her former ally Maria was released from Impact Wrestling. On April 21, 2017, she defeated Christina Von Eerie to win the GFW Women's Championship, making her the first woman to have held the Impact Wrestling Knockouts Championship and the GFW Women's Championship. At Slammiversary, GFW Women's Champion defeated Impact Knockouts Champion Rosemary to unify the titles, entering her second reign as the new Unified GFW Knockouts Champion. At the Destination X, Sienna retained her Knockouts championship against Gail Kim due to interference from the returning Taryn Terrell. Following this, at Bound For Glory Sienna lost the Knockouts championship to Gail Kim, in a match involving Allie as well.

On the March 22, 2018 episode of Impact Wrestling, Sienna unsuccessfully challenged Allie for her Knockouts Championship. In July 2018, Sienna's profile on the roster page of the Impact Wrestling website was moved to the Alumni section, confirming her departure.

=== WWE (2018) ===
It was announced on August 3, 2018, that Kay would compete in the second annual Mae Young Classic tournament. She was defeated in the first round by former rival Mia Yim.

=== National Wrestling Alliance (2019–2020) ===
Kay was scheduled to challenge Jazz for the NWA World Women's Championship on April 27, 2019, at the Crockett Cup. However, Jazz vacated her championship due to medical and personal reasons. At the Crockett Cup, Kay defeated Santana Garrett to win the vacant championship. On May 12, Kay had her first successful championship defense against Marti Belle on ROH. Throughout her championship reign, Kay went on to fend off title contenders such as Heather Monroe, Kacee Carlisle, ODB and Rain.

At NWA Hard Times on January 24, 2020, Kay lost the championship to Thunder Rosa. On September 29, Kay had her first match in 8 months as she was on hiatus due to the COVID-19 restrictions, defeating Nicole Savoy on UWN Primetime Live. On November 3, Kay announced her departure from NWA.

=== AEW / ROH (2020–2021) ===
On November 7, 2020, Kay made her All Elite Wrestling (AEW) debut during the Buy In of Full Gear where she challenged Serena Deeb for the NWA World Women's Championship, but was unsuccessful.

On May 20, 2021, Kay was announced to return for ROH as part of a tournament to crown the inaugural ROH Women's World Champion. On the August 4th edition of ROH Women's Division Wednesday, Kay defeated Willow in the first round of the tournament. On the August 28th televised episode, Kay was eliminated from the tournament after losing to Trish Adora.

=== Return to NWA (2021–2022) ===
In August 2021, NWA announced the return of Kay alongside Marti Belle, going by the team name The Hex, to participate at NWA EmPowerrr, on August 28, in a tournament to crown the new NWA World Women's Tag Team Champions. At the event, The Hex defeated KiLynn King and Red Velvet in a tournament final to win the revived titles. On the October 26 episode of Powerrr, THe Hex had their first successful against the team of Jennacide and Paola Blaze. The Hex also defended their championship on Ring of Honor (ROH) during the October 27 edition of Women's Division Wednesday, by successfully defeating The Allüre (Angelina Love and Mandy Leon). On June 11, 2022, at Alwayz Ready, The Hex lost the World Women's Tag Team Championship to Pretty Empowered (Ella Envy and Kenzie Paige), ending their reign at 287 days.

=== Return to Total Nonstop Action Wrestling (2023) ===
On January 20, 2023, Kay, teaming with Marti Belle as The Hex, returned to Impact Wrestling accompanied by Father James Mitchell and attacked Rosemary, Jessicka and Taya Valkyrie. At No Surrender, they were unsuccessful at winning the Impact Knockouts World Tag Team Championship from The Death Dollz.

=== Second return to NWA (2026-present) ===
On an episode of NWA Powerrr that aired 10 February 2026, The Hex defeated Tiffany Nieves and Valentina Rossi to regain the NWA World Women's Tag Team Titles. They held the titles until the June 13 episode of NWA Power, losing the titles to Pretty Empowered in a triple threat match that also featured Clara Carter and "Hollyhood" Haley J.

== Championships and accomplishments ==
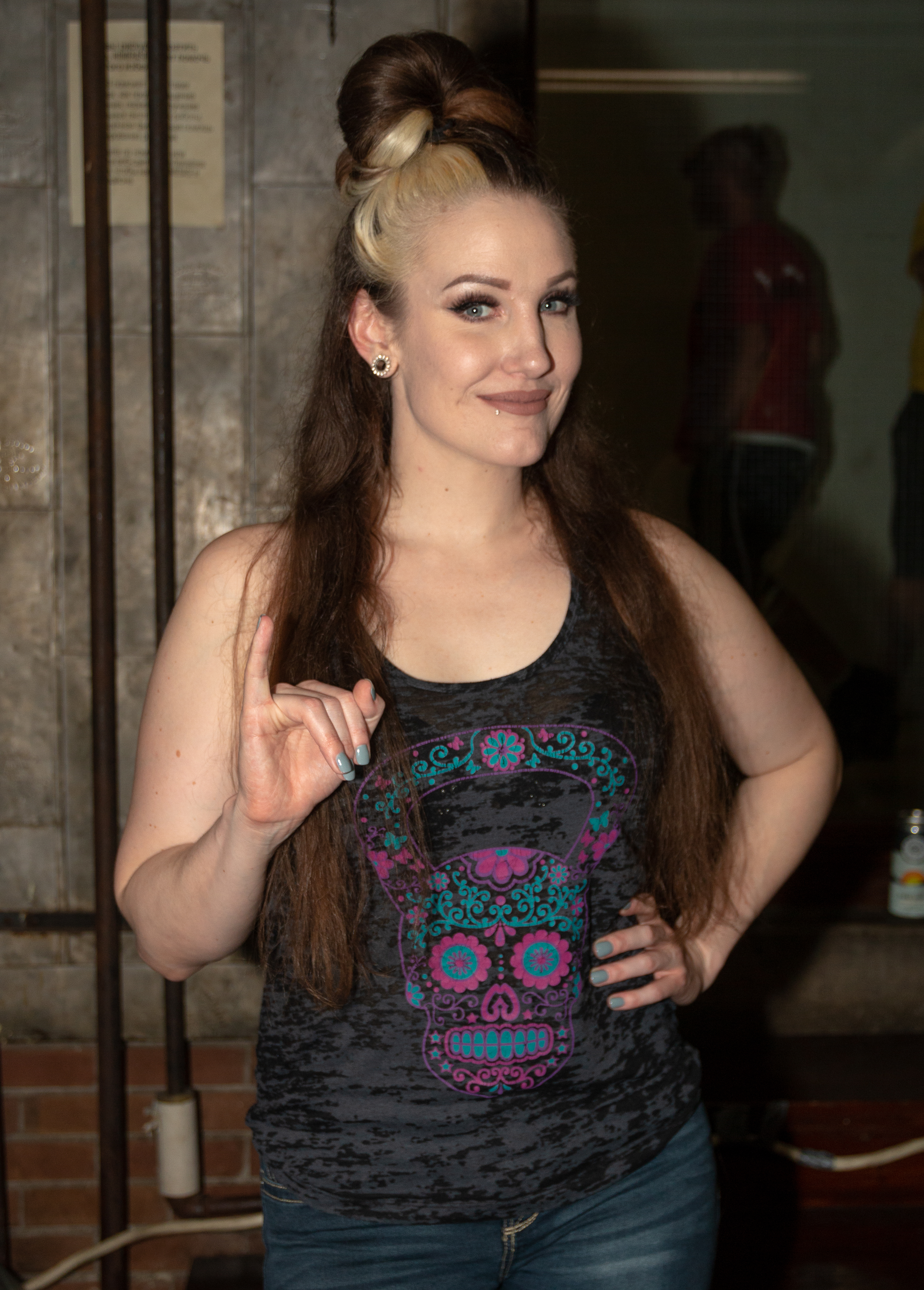
Kay is a two-time Shine Champion.

- AAW Wrestling
  - AAW Women's Championship (1 time)
- Absolute Intense Wrestling
  - AIW Women's Championship (1 time)
- CLASH Wrestling
  - CLASH Women's Championship (current)
- Global Force Wrestling
  - GFW Women's Championship (1 time)
- National Wrestling Alliance
  - NWA World Women's Championship (1 time)
  - NWA World Women's Tag Team Championship (2 times) – with Marti Belle
  - NWA World Women's Tag Team Championship Tournament (2021) – with Marti Belle
- Pro-Wrestling: EVE
  - Pro-Wrestling: EVE Tag Team Championship (1 time) – with Marti Belle
- Pro Wrestling Illustrated
  - Ranked No. 8 of the top 50 female wrestlers in the PWI Female 50 in 2017
  - Ranked No. 9 of the top 100 tag teams in the PWI Tag Team 100 of 2022 with Marti Belle
- Shine Wrestling
  - Shine Championship (2 times)
  - Shine Tag Team Championship (1 time) – with Marti Belle
  - Shine Championship Tournament (2018)
- Total Nonstop Action Wrestling / Impact Wrestling
  - TNA/Impact Knockouts Championship (2 times)
- Women Superstars Uncensored
  - WSU Tag Team Championship (1 time) – with Sassy Stephie
