= Mia Yim =

American professional wrestler (born 1989)

- Yim in 2016

Personal information
- Born: Stephanie Hym Bell; April 16, 1989 (age 37) Los Angeles, California, U.S.
- Education: Virginia Union University (BS)
- Spouse: Keith Lee (m. 2022; div. 2025)
- Relative: Big E (brother-in-law)

Professional wrestling career
- Ring name(s): Mia Yim; Princess Mia; Jade; Michin; Reckoning
- Billed height: 5 ft 7 in (1.70 m)
- Billed weight: 132 lb (60 kg)
- Billed from: San Diego, California; Fontana, California
- Trained by: Christian York; CA Elliot; John Kermon; Mark Bravura; ROH Dojo; WWE Performance Center
- Debut: August 22, 2009

Twitch information
- Channel: OfficialMiaYim
- Years active: 2017–present
- Genres: Gaming; Just Chatting
- Followers: 52.2K
- Last updated: October 17, 2026

Stephanie Hym Bell (born April 16, 1989), better known by the ring name Mia Yim, is an American professional wrestler. She has been signed to WWE since November 2022, where she performs on the SmackDown brand under the ring name Michin (/ˈmiːtʃɪn/ MEE-chin, Korean: 미친, lit. 'crazy'). She is currently one-half of the WWE Women's Tag Team Champions alongside B-Fab in their first reign both, as a team and individually.

Bell is also known for her time in Total Nonstop Action Wrestling (TNA), where she is a former one-time TNA Knockouts Champion, and during her first stint there, performed under the ring name Jade and was a member of The Dollhouse stable alongside Taryn Terrell and Marti Belle. She has also performed for Combat Zone Wrestling (CZW), Shine Wrestling, and Shimmer Women Athletes. In Shine, she held both the Shine Championship and the Shine Tag Team Championship (with Leva Bates). In addition, she has wrestled in Japan for Reina Joshi Puroresu.

Bell signed with WWE in 2018 after an impressive performance in the second Mae Young Classic, and was assigned to the developmental brand, NXT, as Mia Yim. She joined the main roster in 2020 and became a part of Retribution under the ring name Reckoning. She was released in 2021, and briefly returned to Impact Wrestling and the independent circuit in 2022. She returned to WWE in November of that same year as Mia Yim, but shortly after changed her ring name to Michin, and she subsequently joined The O.C. until the group's disbandment in mid-2024.

== Early life ==
Stephanie Hym Bell was born on April 16, 1989, in Los Angeles, California. Her father is African American and her mother is Korean. According to Bell, her father was very strict during her childhood due to the sensitive nature of his career. He served in the military before a career as an FBI special agent, working in units for gangs, then missing and exploited children and cyber operations. Bell played volleyball at James Madison High School in the Washington, D.C., suburb of Vienna, Virginia. She then attended Virginia Union University on a volleyball scholarship, where she studied information technology. She played volleyball until her senior year.

== Professional wrestling career ==
=== Early career (2009–2011) ===
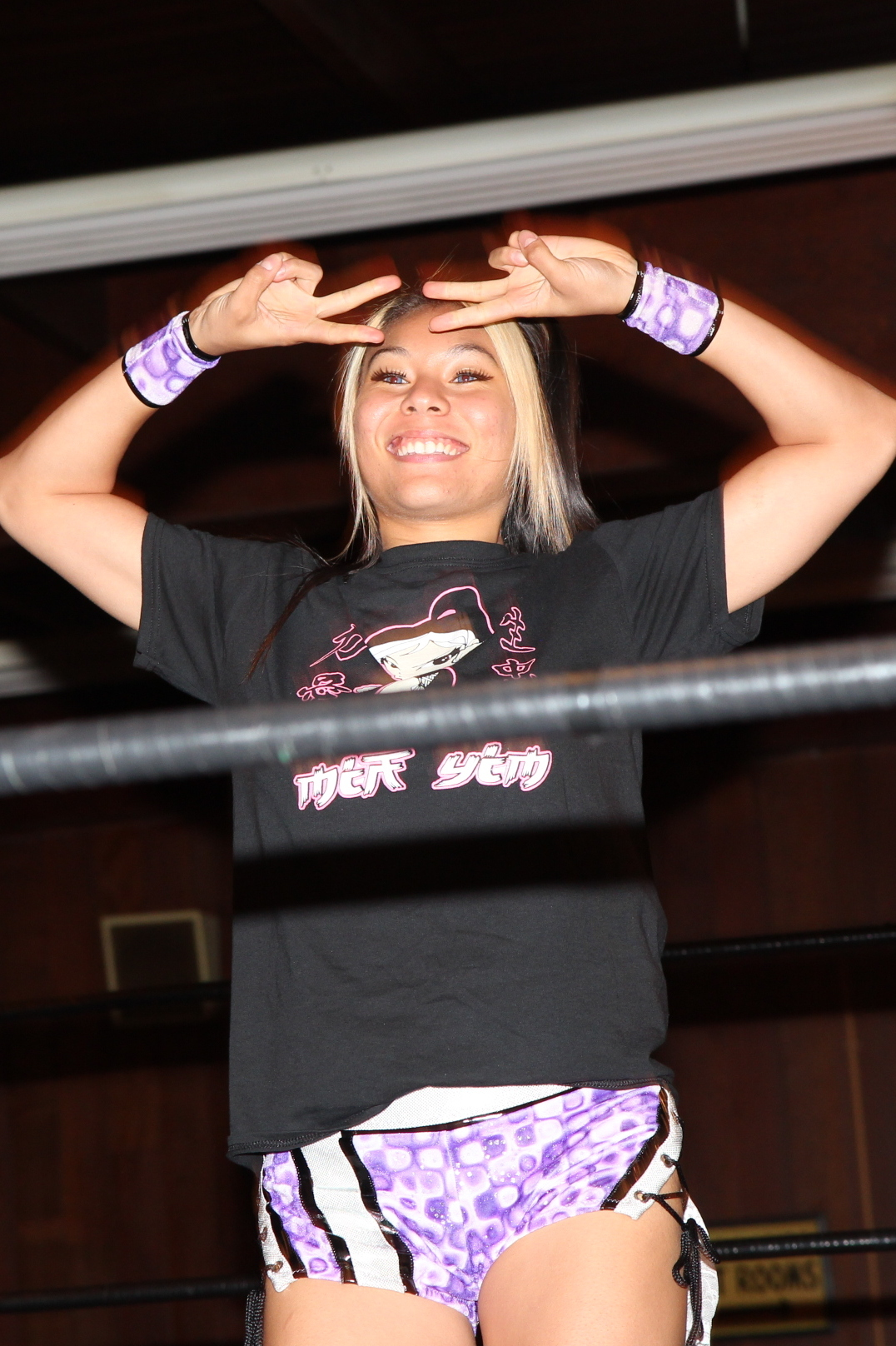
Yim in 2013

A fan of professional wrestling since her childhood, Bell began training at a wrestling school in Manassas, Virginia, at the age of 18, while attending college. She trained for eighteen months before making her debut on August 22, 2009, adopting the ring name Mia Yim, and initially working primarily for independent promotions in Virginia. After taking bookings outside of Virginia, she wrestled for Jersey All Pro Wrestling (JAPW), facing wrestlers including Annie Social, Angeldust, and Brittany Force. During this time, she met Daizee Haze, through whom she began training at the Ring of Honor (ROH) Wrestling Academy and working for ROH. In ROH, she performed valet duties for The Embassy, beginning in 2011. Yim also wrestled sporadically for ROH, taking on MsChif and Sara Del Rey. In addition, she worked for the International Wrestling Cartel, Real Championship Wrestling, Northeast Wrestling, and Maryland Championship Wrestling (MCW) during her early years in wrestling.

After graduating from college, Yim received an invitation to train and wrestle in Japan with Universal Woman's Pro Wrestling Reina in 2011. Through Reina's relationship with Consejo Mundial de Lucha Libre, Yim also learned Mexican lucha libre.

=== Combat Zone Wrestling (2010–2012) ===
After training with D. J. Hyde at the Combat Zone Wrestling (CZW) training school, Yim began working for CZW as a manager for Adam Cole. Debuting at Cage of Death II in December 2010, the two were presented as a storyline couple, and Yim regularly interfered in Cole's matches to help him win. After helping Cole gain a victory over Greg Excellent at Down With The Sickness 2011 in September, Excellent began feuding with the pair. As part of the storyline, Yim faced Excellent in an intergender match at Night Of Infamy 10: Ultimatum in November. After losing a rematch in January 2012, Yim challenged Excellent to a Tables, Ladders, and Chairs match at Aerial Assault 2012, which Yim won, to conclude the feud. She made only two more appearances for CZW that year before leaving the promotion.

=== Shine Wrestling (2012–2015) ===
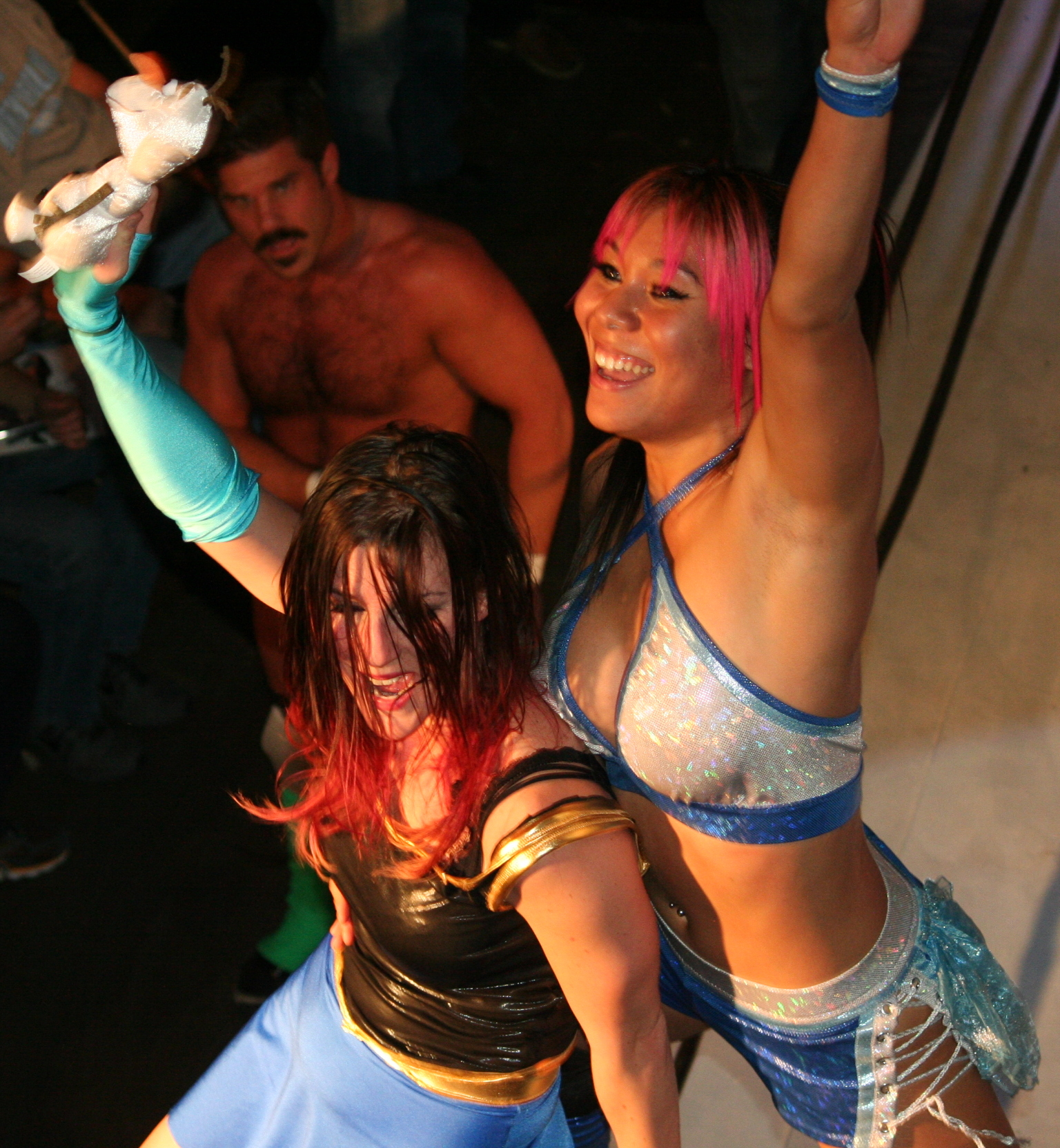
The Lucha Sisters (Yim (back) and Leva Bates (front)) in 2014

Yim debuted for Shine Wrestling at their second show in August 2012, defeating Sassy Stephie. Throughout 2012 and 2013, she faced wrestlers including Jessicka Havok and Tina San Antonio, before entering the tournament to determine the inaugural Shine Champion. She defeated Mercedes Martinez at Shine 10 in May 2013, and at Shine 11, she defeated Leva Bates and Ivelisse Vélez en route to the final, where she lost to Rain. As part of Shine, she also appeared for Evolve, taking on Vélez and Su Yung in showcase matches.

On February 28, 2014, at Shine 17, Yim teamed with Leva Bates during the Shine Tag Team Championship tournament, forming the tag team The Lucha Sisters. They defeated the teams of Cherry Bomb and Kimber Lee, and Sassy Stephie and Jessie Belle Smothers en route to the final, where they defeated Made In Sin (Allysin Kay and Taylor Made) to become the inaugural Shine Tag Team Champions. They successfully defended the championship against Nevaeh and Sassy Stephie, and against the team of Evie and Madison Eagles at Shine 18, but lost it to Legendary (Malia Hosaka and Brandi Wine) at Shine 20 on June 27. The Lucha Sisters failed to regain the title in a rematch in August at Shine 21.

On November 16, 2014, during the WWNLive tour in China, Yim defeated Ivelisse Vélez to win the Shine Championship, making her the first woman to have held both the Shine Championship and Shine Tag Team Championship. At Shine 26 on April 3, 2015, Yim lost the championship to NWA World Women's Champion Santana Garrett in a title vs. title match.

At Shine 28, Yim was defeated by Allysin Kay, and began showing signs of a heel turn when she blamed Leva Bates for the loss. Yim turned villainous at Shine 31 on December 11, 2015, when she attacked Leva Bates after the duo lost to Marti Belle and Jayme Jameson in a match for the vacant SHINE Tag Team Championship.

=== Shimmer Women Athletes (2013) ===
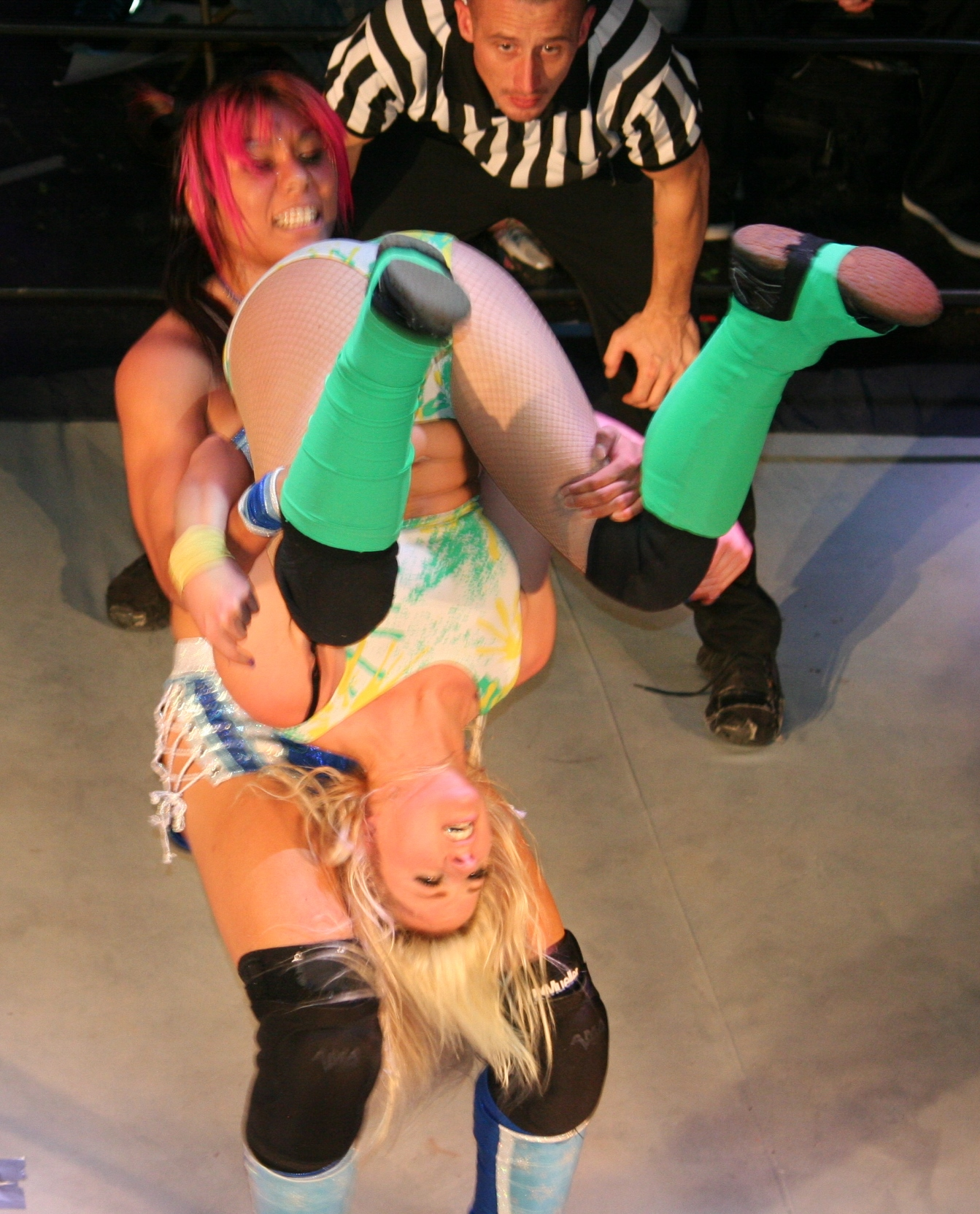
Mia Yim performing a package piledriver on Candice LeRae in 2014

Yim made her debut for Shimmer Women Athletes on April 6, 2013, at Volume 53 with a loss to Amazing Kong. She earned her first victory at Volume 56 later that month against Evie, before a series of losses to Jessicka Havok, Hikaru Shida, and Madison Eagles. After victories over Melanie Cruise, Angie Skye, and Hikaru Shida, Yim unsuccessfully challenged Cheerleader Melissa for the Shimmer Championship at Volume 65 in April 2014. Yim finished out 2014 facing wrestlers including Ray, Akino, and Tsukasa Fujimoto.

=== Full Impact Pro (2013) ===
In April 2013, Yim debuted for Full Impact Pro, defeating Larry Dallas in an intergender match. In August, Yim and Dos Ben Dejos (Jay Rios and Eddie Cruz) defeated Dallas and The Now (Vik Dalishus and Hale Collins) in a Tables, Ladders, and Chairs match when Yim pinned Dallas. Yim spent the next several months managing Dos Ben Dejos, along with Leva Bates, while also wrestling in Shine showcase matches against Jessicka Havok and Ivelisse Vélez. In June 2014, The Lucha Sisters successfully defended the Shine Tag Team Championship against Vélez and Candice LeRae at an FIP event. In January 2015, Yim lost to Santana in a Shine showcase match.

=== Total Nonstop Action Wrestling / Impact Wrestling (2015–2017) ===
==== Early appearances (2010–2015) ====
Yim wrestled a dark match for Total Nonstop Action Wrestling (TNA) in mid-2010, while on vacation in Florida with her family. In March 2013, Yim competed at TNA's Knockouts Knockdown pay-per-view, where she was defeated by Tara. She returned to the promotion in May 2014 for Knockouts Knockdown 2, where she defeated Brittany to qualify for the gauntlet match later that night, in which she was eliminated by Taryn Terrell. Yim made a third appearance in 2015 at Knockouts Knockdown 3, losing to Brooke.

==== The Dollhouse (2015–2016) ====
In April 2015, TNA began airing vignettes promoting The Dollhouse (Yim and Marti Bell)'s debut, in which Yim's ring name was changed to Jade. Jade and Bell debuted on the TKO: Night of Knockouts edition of Impact Wrestling on April 24, where Jade lost to Laura Dennis by disqualification after the two attacked referee Brian Stiffler as well as ring announcer Christy Hemme, establishing themselves as heels in the process. Later that night, Jade and Marti helped Taryn Terrell retain her TNA Women's Knockout Championship against Awesome Kong, with Terrell joining The Dollhouse in the process. The Dollhouse wrestled their first match as a team on the May 8 episode of Impact Wrestling, where they defeated Awesome Kong and Gail Kim in a 3–on–2 handicap match. Jade and Bell would regularly interfere in Terrell's championship matches and ensure the win for her. At Slammiversary XIII, The Dollhouse lost to Awesome Kong and Brooke in another 3–on–2 handicap match. On the July 15 episode of Impact Wrestling, Terrell lost the championship to Brooke, after Gail Kim returned and attacked Jade, causing a distraction. On the Turning Point special episode of Impact Wrestling on August 19, Jade and Bell competed in a 2-on-1 handicap six sides of steel cage match against Gail Kim, which Kim would win.

On the September 23 episode of Impact Wrestling, Jade unsuccessfully challenged Gail Kim for the TNA Women's Knockout Championship. On February 23, 2016, during the Lockdown special episode of Impact Wrestling, Jade scored the pinfall over Kim in a six–Knockout Lethal Lockdown match, as a result, Jade received another shot at Kim's TNA Women's Knockout Championship, two weeks later, but failed to win the title.

==== TNA Knockouts Champion (2016–2017) ====
Yim in 2017

On April 5, Jade defeated Kim and Madison Rayne in a three–way match to win the TNA Knockouts Championship for the first time. On the same day, during the tapings for Knockouts Knockdown 4, Jade went on to defeat Leva Bates and the gauntlet match, with lastly eliminating Madison Rayne, to become the new "Queen of the Knockouts". In her first title defense, on the April 12 episode of Impact Wrestling, Jade defeated Madison Rayne to retain her championship.

In late April, Jade started a feud with Knockouts Commissioner Maria which led to her first face turn since signing with the company. Few weeks later, she was attacked by the debuting Sienna after she refused to lay down for Maria. On the May 10 episode of Impact Wrestling, Jade successfully defended her title against Kim by DQ after Sienna attacked them. Jade was then scheduled to face Maria's bodyguard Sienna at Slammiversary with the title on the line. On the May 31 episode of Impact Wrestling, Jade teamed up with her former rival Kim to defeat Sienna and Allie in a tag-team match. At Slammiversary, Jade would lose the Knockouts Championship to Sienna after Marti Bell hit Jade in the back with a baton in a triple threat match that also featured Kim, ending her reign at 87 days.

On August 25, 2016, at Turning Point Jade competed in a Five–way match against the champion Sienna, Marti Bell, Madison Rayne and Allie for the TNA Knockouts Championship, which was won by Allie. At Bound for Glory, Jade defeated Sienna. On the December 2 episode of Impact Wrestling, Jade lost to Rosemary in a "Six Sides of Steel" cage match for the vacated TNA Knockouts Championship. In mid–January 2017, the feud between Rosemary and Jade re–emerged and this led to a Monster's ball match, where Rosemary defeated Jade to retain her championship. Jade received a rematch against Rosemary on the March 2 episode of Impact Wrestling, in a Last Knockout Standing match, which she lost. This was Jade's last match in TNA, and it was officially announced earlier in the week that she was not signed to a new contract and confirming her departure from the company.

=== WWE (2018–2021) ===
==== Early appearances (2014–2018) ====
In 2014 and 2015, Yim appeared in the WWE a number of times as one of Adam Rose's rose buds. She also worked as enhancement talent for WWE's developmental territory NXT at the October 2014 television tapings, losing to Charlotte.

On July 13, 2017, Yim returned to WWE by entering the Mae Young Classic tournament, representing her mother's country of South Korea. She defeated Sarah Logan in her first round match, but lost to Shayna Baszler in the second round match the following day. On August 9, 2018, Yim once again returned to the WWE by entering the Mae Young Classic tournament for the second time, defeating Allysin Kay in the first round and the returning Kaitlyn in the second before losing to Toni Storm in the quarterfinals.

==== NXT (2018–2020) ====
Thanks to her performance at the Mae Young Classic, on September 24, it was confirmed that Yim was signed to a contract with WWE and would begin working at NXT. Just a month later, on the October 24 episode of NXT, Yim made her in–ring debut as part of the brand, defeating Aliyah, thus establishing herself as a face. In November, after a backstage altercation between the two, Yim faced Bianca Belair who would hand her first loss and that would also spark a feud between the two. Yim was able to bounce off the loss and defeat Reina Gonzalez to earn herself a spot for an upcoming fatal–four-way match to determine the number one contender for the NXT Women's Championship, however, the match was won by Belair. Shortly after Belair's undefeated streak was ended, Yim was able to defeat her in two different matches to end their feud.

On August 10 at NXT TakeOver: Toronto, Yim lost to Shayna Baszler in an NXT Women's Championship match. In November, Yim made her main roster debut as part of the NXT talent that were placed in an invasion angle with Raw and SmackDown as part of the Survivor Series pay-per-view. Yim was chosen by Rhea Ripley to join her team for the first-ever women's WarGames match against Shayna Baszler's team. On November 23 at NXT TakeOver: WarGames, just before the match took place, Yim was attacked backstage and unable to compete in the women's WarGames match. However, Yim was replaced by Dakota Kai on Team Ripley, who eventually turned on Team Ripley and attacked Tegan Nox. 11 days later on the December 4 episode of NXT, Yim revealed that Kai attacked her backstage and this led to a grudge match the following week, which Yim lost. On June 7, 2020, at TakeOver: In Your House, Yim teamed up with Nox and Shotzi Blackheart against and defeated Kai, Raquel Gonzalez and Candice LeRae in a six-woman tag team match.

==== Retribution (2020–2021) ====
On the September 21, 2020, episode of Raw, several weeks after her last appearance on NXT, Mia Yim turned heel in her main roster debut by revealing herself as a member of the villainous stable Retribution under the ring name Reckoning. Yim made her ring-debut on the November 30, 2020, of Raw, in a losing effort against Dana Brooke Throughout February and March, tension was teased among the group as the group's leader, Mustafa Ali, would publicly berate the rest of the group whenever they lost a match. This culminated at Fastlane, when Reckoning walked out on Ali along with Slapjack, while Mace and T-Bar gave Ali a double chokeslam, effectively disbanding the group. Two months later, Yim was assigned to the SmackDown brand. In July, Yim was traded back to the Raw brand in exchange for Naomi. As part of the 2021 Draft, the Reckoning character was quietly dropped as Yim was officially drafted to the Raw brand. On November 4, 2021, Yim was released from her WWE contract without ever reappearing on television.

=== Return to the independent circuit (2022) ===
On March 31, 2022, Yim made her in-ring return during the WrestleCon Mark Hitchcock Memorial Super Show, where she defeated Athena.

=== Return to Impact Wrestling (2022) ===
At Under Siege, on May 7, 2022, Bell, using the Mia Yim name instead of Jade, made her return to Impact Wrestling, saving Taya Valkyrie from an attack by Deonna Purrazzo. On the May 19 episode of Impact!, Yim had her first match at Impact in five years, where she alongside Jordynne Grace and Valkyrie defeated the team of Purrazzo, Savannah Evans and the Knockouts World Champion Tasha Steelz. On June 19 at Slammiversary, she competed in the inaugural Queen of the Mountain match for the Knockouts World Championship, which was won by Grace. On July 1 at Against All Odds, Yim teamed with Mickie James and fought Purrazzo and Chelsea Green in a losing effort.

On August 12 at Emergence, Yim challenged Grace for the Knockouts World Championship, but failed to win the title. On September 23 at Victory Road, Yim competed in an Intergender Triple Threat Revolver to determine the number one contender for the X Division Championship, eliminating Laredo Kid and Alex Zayne but was eliminated by Kenny King. She was defeated by Mickie James at Bound for Glory and three days later, she left the company. On the October 20 episode of Impact!, Yim wrestled her last match for the company by facing Taylor Wilde in a losing effort.

=== Return to WWE (2022–present) ===
Michin making her entrance at the 2025 Royal Rumble

On the November 7, 2022, episode of Raw, Yim returned to WWE attacking Rhea Ripley of The Judgment Day and aligning with The O.C. (AJ Styles, Karl Anderson, and Luke Gallows). Three weeks later at Survivor Series WarGames on November 26, Yim's team defeated Ripley's team in a WarGames match. In February, her ring name was changed to Michin (Korean: 미친), which means crazy in Korean, and was her mother's childhood nickname for her. As part of the 2023 WWE Draft, Michin was drafted to the SmackDown brand. On the December 22, 2023, episode of SmackDown, Michin pinned WWE Women's Champion Iyo Sky in an eight-women tag team holiday street fight match against Damage CTRL, granting her a title shot at SmackDown: New Year's Revolution on January 5, 2024, where she failed to defeat Sky for the title.

On the May 28 episode of NXT, Michin defeated Tatum Paxley to qualify for a spot in the six-woman ladder match to crown the inaugural NXT Women's North American Championship at NXT Battleground but failed to win the title at the event. Michin went on to participate in the tournament to crown the inaugural Women's United States Champion, but lost to Green in the tournament final at Saturday Night's Main Event on December 14.

On the March 20, 2026 episode of SmackDown, Michin and B-Fab turned heel by attacking Rhea Ripley and aligned themselves with Jade Cargill. On the October 23 episode of SmackDown, Michin and B-Fab defeated Alexa Bliss and Tatum Paxley to win the WWE Women's Tag Team Championship, marking her first championship win in WWE. In November, Fatal Influence (Jacy Jayne, Fallon Henley and Lainey Reid) allied with Cargill and Michin (with B-Fab) as they face Bliss, Paxley, Charlotte Flair, Bayley, and Stephanie Vaquer in a WarGames match at Survivor Series: WarGames on November 28.

== Personal life ==
Bell is proficient in American sign language. She learned to sign from her deaf former boyfriend. She has worked as a captionist for the deaf and hard of hearing.

Bell previously dated pro wrestler Jay Rios and moved to Florida in 2013 to live together. In 2016, Bell began publicly participating in awareness and advocacy after revealing that she is a survivor of domestic abuse. This includes painting her left ring fingernail purple for Safe Horizon's #PutTheNailinIt campaign. Her advocacy led to her being named one of BBC's 100 Women in 2016. Bell detailed the relationship in an hour-long interview with Lillian Garcia in 2019, including relocating to Florida before the abuse started, how it continued for two years, leaving the relationship after he cheated on her with a friend, and Shelton Benjamin's support. Though Bell did not identify Rios by name, details pointed to him and he identified himself on a deleted social media post.

On February 11, 2021, Bell got engaged to fellow professional wrestler Keith Lee. The couple married on February 5, 2022. They divorced in 2025.

On October 21, 2026, her sister, Kris, married fellow professional wrestler Ettore Ewen, better known as Big E.

== Other media ==
Bell appeared as a playable character in video games WWE 2K20, WWE 2K22 (as both Mia Yim and Reckoning), and WWE 2K23 (DLC) as Mia Yim. She later appeared in WWE 2K24, WWE 2K25, and WWE 2K26 as Michin.

She streams on Twitch under the name "OfficialMiaYim".

=== Filmography ===
Year	Title	Role	Notes
2020	The Main Event	Lights Out Leslie	
2023	Celebrity Family Feud	Herself	Episode: “WWE Women vs. WWE Men and Marcus Lemonis vs. Bert Kriescher”
2025	Chamber of Horrors	Herself	Episode: “Mia Yim Vs. The Most Evil House in Texas”

=== Podcasts ===
Year	Title	Role	Notes
2019	Chasing Glory With Lilian Garcia	Herself	1 episode
2025	THE SPEAKEEZY	Herself	1 episode
2025	Ring The Belle	Herself	1 episode

== Championships and accomplishments ==
- BBC
  - 100 Women (2016)
- Big Time Wrestling
  - BTW Women's Championship (1 time)
- DDT Pro-Wrestling
  - Ironman Heavymetalweight Championship (1 time)
- Florida Underground Wrestling
  - NWA FUW Women's Championship (1 time, inaugural)
- Pro Wrestling Illustrated
  - Ranked No. 6 of the top 50 female wrestlers in the PWI Female 50 in 2016
- Shine Wrestling
  - Shine Championship (1 time)
  - Shine Tag Team Championship (1 time) – with Leva Bates
  - Shine Tag Team Title Tournament (2014)
- Southside Wrestling
  - Queen of Southside Championship (1 time)
- Tidal Championship Wrestling
  - TCW Women's Championship (1 time)
- Total Nonstop Action Wrestling
  - TNA Knockouts Championship (1 time)
  - Queen of the Knockouts (2016)
  - TNA World Cup (2016) – with Jeff Hardy, Jessie Godderz, Eddie Edwards and Robbie E
- WrestleCrap
  - Gooker Award (2020) – as part of Retribution
- WWE
  - WWE Women's Tag Team Championship (1 time, current) – with B-Fab
