= Shine Championship =

Professional wrestling women's championship

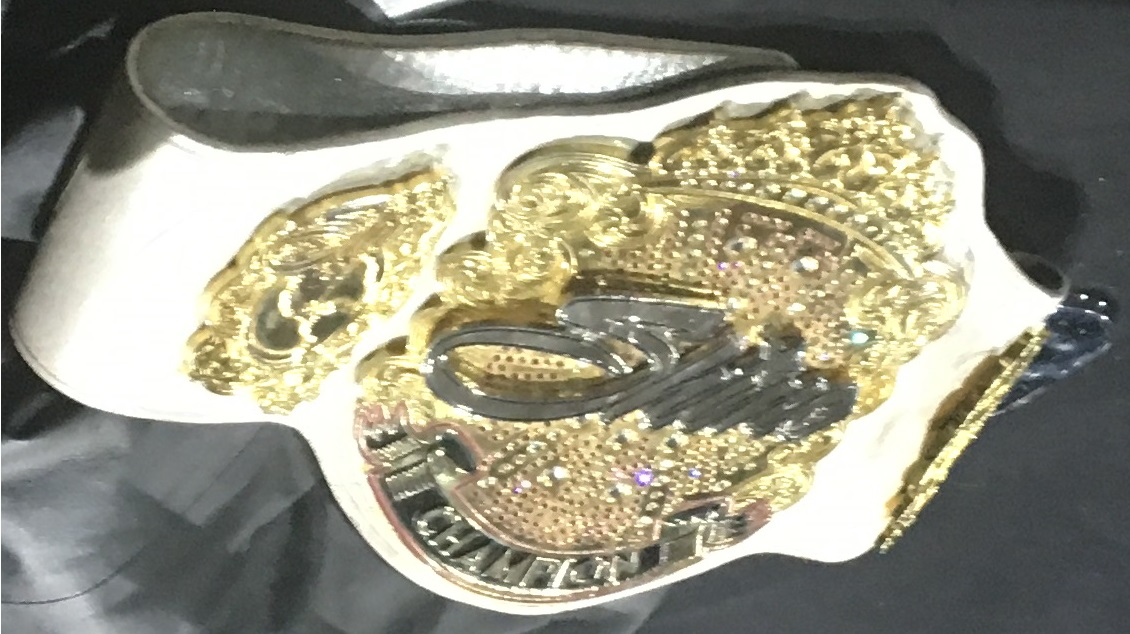

Details
- Promotion: World Wrestling Network
- Brand: Shine Wrestling
- Date established: July 12, 2013
- Current champion: Kelsey Raegan
- Date won: March 9, 2025
Statistics
- First champion: Rain
- Most reigns: Ivelisse (4 reigns)
- Longest reign: Ivelisse (4th reign, 1,183 days)
- Shortest reign: Mercedes Martinez (1 day)
- Oldest champion: Mercedes Martinez (39 years, 26 days)
- Youngest champion: Miyu Yamashita (24 years, 20 days)
- Heaviest champion: Allysin Kay; 150 lb (68 kg)
- Lightest champion: Ivelisse; 115 lb (52 kg)

The Shine Championship is a women's professional wrestling championship in Shine Wrestling, a brand division of the World Wrestling Network. Championship reigns are determined by professional wrestling matches, in which competitors are involved in scripted rivalries. These narratives create feuds between the various competitors, which cast them as villains and heroines. Ivelisse has the most reigns at 4.

== Championship Tournaments ==
=== Inaugural Championship Tournament (2013) ===
The tournament was held over two months from April 19 to July 12, 2013, at Shine 9 and Shine 10, at The Orpheum in Ybor City, Florida. The first two rounds, semis and final were all held on the July 12 event called Shine 11.

- Saraya Knight defeated Su Yung
- Jessicka Havok defeated Madison Eagles
- Rain defeated Angelina Love
- Santana Garrett defeated Kimberly
- Leva Bates defeated Taylor Made
- Mia Yim defeated Mercedes Martinez
- LuFisto defeated Mercedes Martinez, Nikki Roxx and Su Yung in a fatal four-way match, winner faces Rain in the first round
- Ivelisse defeated Awesome Kong, Angelina Love and Kimberly in a four-way match, winner faces Garrett in the first round

notes:

- Jessicka Havok defeated Portia Perez to keep her spot in the tournament at Shine 9
- Allysin Kay defeated Nikki Roxx but was later suspended for 90 days by Lexie Fyfe and automatically eliminated at Shine 9
- Jazz defeated Ivelisse but never entered the tournament for undisclosed reasons

The tournament brackets were:

Quarterfinals
Saraya Knight
Jessicka Havok	Pin
Rain	Pin
LuFisto
Mia Yim	Pin
Leva Bates
Ivelisse	Pin
Santana

Semifinals
Rain	Pin
Jessicka Havok
Mia Yim	Pin
Ivelisse

Finals
Mia Yim
Rain	Pin

=== Second championship tournament (2018) ===
Quarterfinals
Candy Cartwright
Ivelisse	Pin
Mercedes Martinez	Sub
Stormie Lee
Allysin Kay	Pin
Brandi Lauren
Priscilla Kelly
Santana Garrett	Pin

Semifinals
Ivelisse
Mercedes Martinez	Pin
Allysin Kay	Sub
Santana Garrett

Final
Mercedes Martinez
Allysin Kay	Sub

== Reigns ==
Key
No.	Overall reign number
Reign	Reign number for the specific champion
Days	Number of days held
Defenses	Number of successful defenses
+	Current reign is changing daily

No.	Champion	Championship change			Reign statistics			Notes	Ref.
No.	Champion	Date	Event	Location	Reign	Days	Defenses	Notes	Ref.
Shine Wrestling
1	Rain	July 12, 2013	Shine 11	Ybor City, FL	1	196	4	Rain defeated Mia Yim in the finals of an eight-women tournament to become the inaugural champion.	
2	Ivelisse	January 24, 2014	Shine 16	Ybor City, FL	1	296	13		
3	Mia Yim	November 16, 2014	WWNLive China Tour	Beijing, China	1	138	3		
4	Santana Garrett	April 3, 2015	Shine 26	Ybor City, FL	1	252	13	This was a title vs. title match in which Garrett also defended the NWA World Women's Championship.	
5	Taylor Made	December 11, 2015	Shine 31	Ybor City, FL	1	189	4		
6	Ivelisse	June 17, 2016	Shine 35	Ybor City, FL	2	210	4	This was a four-way match, also involving Shimmer Champion Madison Eagles and TNA Knockouts Champion Allysin Kay. The loser of the fall lost her title.	
—	Vacated	January 13, 2017	—	—	—	—	—	The Title was vacated due to Ivelisse being injured.	
7	LuFisto	January 13, 2017	Shine 40	Ybor City, FL	1	529	15	LuFisto defeated Allysin Kay and Mercedes Martinez in a Three-way match to win the vacant championship.	
—	Vacated	June 26, 2018	—	—	—	—	—	LuFisto relinquished the title due to health reasons.	
8	Allysin Kay	September 8, 2018	Shine 53	Queens, NYC	1	209	4	Kay defeated Mercedes Martinez in the finals of an eight-women tournament to win the vacant championship.	
9	Miyu Yamashita	April 5, 2019	WWN Supershow Mercury Rising 2019	New York City, NY	1	31	0	This was a title vs. title match also contested for Yamashita's Tokyo Princess of Princess Championship.	
10	Allysin Kay	May 6, 2019	TJP Girls Shining, I Will Fly to Sapporo!	Sapporo, Hokkaido, Japan	2	221	4		
11	Mercedes Martinez	December 13, 2019	Shine 63	Livonia, MI	1	1	0	This was a title vs. career match.	
12	Ivelisse	December 14, 2019	Shine 64	Chicago, IL	3	701	3		
13	Natalia Markova	November 14, 2021	WWN Supershow: Battle Of The Belts 2021	Clearwater, Florida	1	28	0		
14	Ivelisse	December 12, 2021	Shine 70	Clearwater, Florida	4	1,183	11		
15	Kelsey Raegan	March 9, 2025	WWN Supershow: Uprising	Clearwater, Florida	1	596+	0		

== Combined reigns ==
As of October 26, 2026.

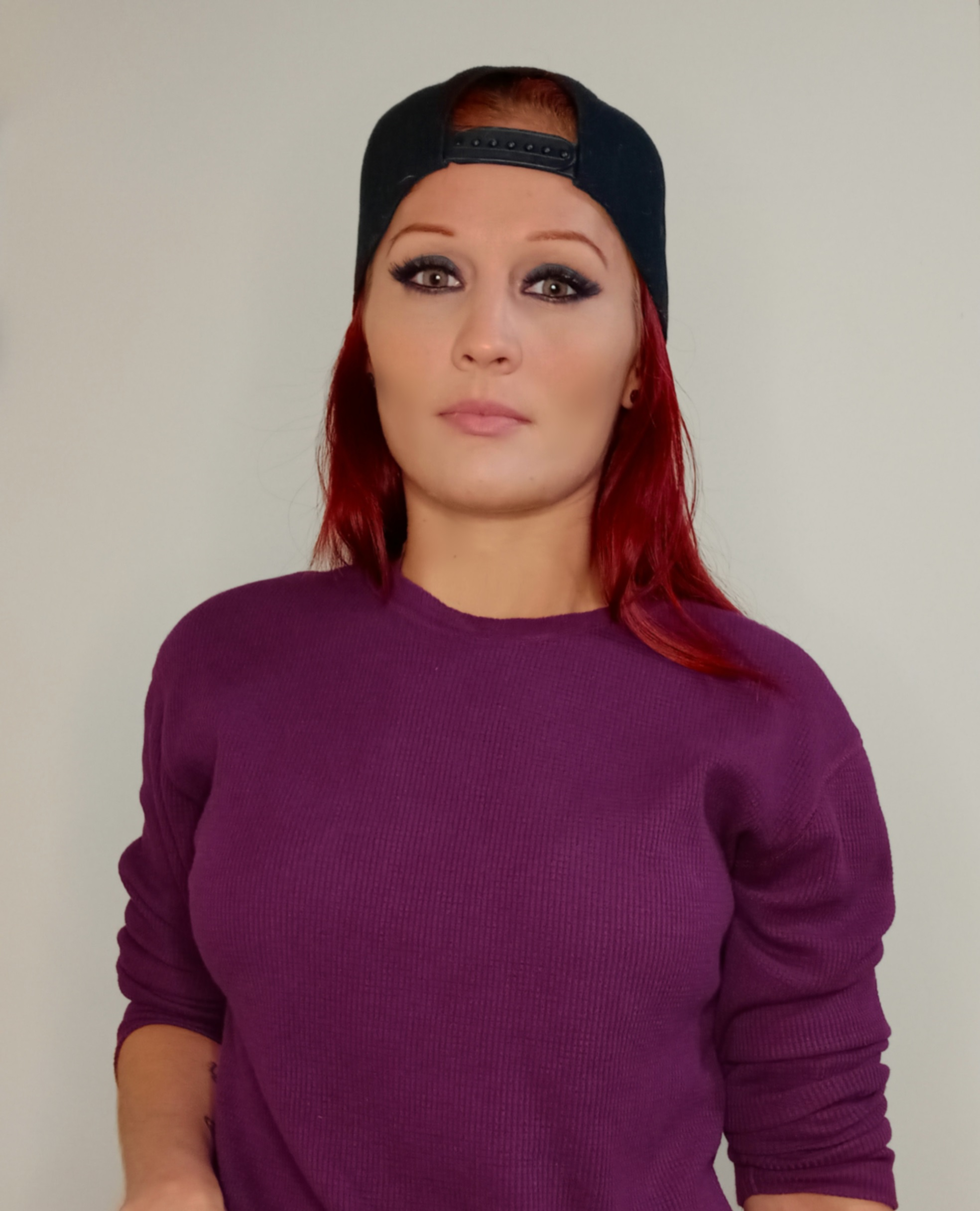
Record four-time, longest combined and longest reigning former champion Ivelisse.

†	Indicates the current champion

Rank	Wrestler	No. of reigns	Combined defenses	Combined days
1	Ivelisse	4	31	2,390
2	Kelsey Raegan †	1	0	596+
3	LuFisto	1	15	529
4	Allysin Kay	2	8	430
5	Santana Garrett	1	13	252
6	Rain	1	4	196
7	Taylor Made	1	4	189
8	Mia Yim	1	3	138
9	Miyu Yamashita	1	0	31
10	Natalia Markova	1	0	28
11	Mercedes Martinez	1	0	1
