= Pro-Wrestling: EVE Tag Team Championship =

Women's tag team championship

Details
- Promotion: Pro-Wrestling: EVE
- Date established: 30 June 2019
- Current champions: Hai High Mate (Maika and Hanako)
- Date won: 8 November 2026
Statistics
- First champions: Wrestle Friends (Erin Angel and Jetta)
- Most reigns: As a team (2 reigns): The Uprising (Rhia O'Reilly and Skye Smitson) As an individual (3 reigns): Skye Smitson
- Longest reign: Medusa Complex (Charli Evans and Millie McKenzie) (756 days)
- Shortest reign: Pretty Psycho (Amira Blair and Zoe Lucas) (<1 day)
- Oldest champion: Erin Angel (32 years, 106 days)
- Youngest champion: Millie McKenzie (19 years, 208 days)
- Heaviest champion: Wrestle Friends (Erin Angel and Jetta) (258 lb (117 kg) combined)
- Lightest champion: Wrestle Friends (Erin Angel and Jetta) (258 lb (117 kg) combined)

The Pro Wrestling: EVE Tag Team Championship is a women's professional wrestling world tag team championship created and promoted by the American independent promotion Pro-Wrestling: EVE. The championship was established on 30 June 2019, with Wrestle Friends (Erin Angel and Jetta) being the inaugural champions.

== Title history ==
On 30 June 2019, Wrestle Friends (Erin Angel and Jetta) became the inaugural champions after defeating Diamond Vogue Collective (Jinny and Mercedez Blaze) and Medusa Complex (Charli Evans and Millie McKenzie) in a three-way tag team match.

Like most professional wrestling championships, the title is won as a result of a scripted match.

== Reigns ==
As of November 11, 2026, overall there have been 18 reigns between 17 different teams composed of 29 individual champions, and two vacancies. The Uprising (Rhea O'Reilly and Skye Smitson) have the most reigns as a team, with Smitson having the most reigns individually. Medusa Complex (Charli Evans and Millie McKenzie) have the longest singular and combined reign at 756 days as a team and individually, while Pretty Psycho (Amira Blair and Zoe Lucas have the shortest reign at less than 1 day. The oldest champion is Erin Angel, winning the title at 32 years old, while the youngest is Millie McKenzie, when she won it at 19.

The current champions are Hai High Mate (Maika and Hanako), who are in their first reign as a team, as well as individually. They won the titles by defeating Hyperactive (Safire Reed and Anita Vaughan) at EVE Elite Encounters II.

Key
No.	Overall reign number
Reign	Reign number for the specific team—reign numbers for the individuals are in parentheses, if different
Days	Number of days held
<1	Reign lasted less than a day
+	Current reign is changing daily

No.	Champion	Championship change			Reign statistics		Notes	Ref.
No.	Champion	Date	Event	Location	Reign	Days	Notes	Ref.
1	Wrestle Friends (Erin Angel and Jetta)	30 June 2019	Wrestle Queendom 2	Bethnal Green, Greater London	1	89	Wrestle Friends defeated Diamond Vogue Collective (Jinny and Mercedez Blaze) and Medusa Complex (Charli Evans and Millie McKenzie) in a three-way tag team match to become the inaugural champions.	
—	Vacated	27 September 2019	Friday Night Riot	London, England	—	—	Erin Angel and Jetta vacated the championship due to Angel's pregnancy.	
2	The Woke Queens (Debbie Keitel and Valkyrie)	12 October 2019	Check Yourself	London, England	1	63	The Woke Queens defeated Laura Di Matteo and Mercedes Martinez in the tournament final to win the vacant championship.	
3	Emersyn Jayne and Gisele Shaw	14 December 2019	Let's Get Shitfaced and Scream into the Void: A Christmas Wrestling Spectacular	London, England	1	28		
4	Medusa Complex (Charli Evans and Millie McKenzie)	11 January 2020	Wrestle Queendom 3	London, England	1	756	This was a three-way tag team elimination match, also involving The Woke Queens (Debbie Keitel and Valkyrie).	
5	The Uprising (Rhia O'Reilly and Skye Smitson)	5 February 2022	Slayers in Spandex 2	London, England	1	27	Charli Evans of the Medusa Complex was unable to compete due to injury, and was replaced by Chantal Jordan.	
6	The Hex (Allysin Kay and Marti Belle)	4 March 2022	Women Behaving Badly	London, England	1	1	This was a winner takes all match, EVE and NWA tag titles were both on the line.	
7	The Uprising (Rhia O'Reilly and Skye Smitson)	5 March 2022	Brawl at the Brewery	London, England	2	308	This was a 2 out of 3 falls match.	
8	The Rock and Rome Express (Laura Di Matteo and Rayne Leverkusen)	7 January 2023	EVE 100	London, England	1	176		
9	Chantal Jordan and Nina Samuels	2 July 2023	No Money in the Bank	London, England	1	140	Rayne Leverkusen's knee was injured before the match.	
10	Royal Aces (Charlie Morgan and Jetta)	19 November 2023	Wrestle Queendom 6	London, England	1 (1, 2)	109		
11	Operation SAS (Skye Smitson and Nightshade)	7 March 2024	Beers, Brawls & Badass Bitches	London, England	1 (3, 1)	183		
12	The Gals (Debbie Keitel and Anita Vaughan)	6 September 2024	EVE 126: Beers, Brawls & Burlesque	London, England	1 (2, 1)	126		
13	Hard Up North (Harley Hudson and Lucy Sky)	10 January 2025	Wrestle Queendom 7	London, England	1 (1, 1)	175	This was a four-way match also involving Aluna and Lucia Lee, and The French Connection (Celine and Princesse Lauriana).	
14	Big Beefy Bitches (Emersyn Jayne and Rhio)	4 July 2025	EVE 136: Mean Grrrls	London, England	1 (2, 1)	28		
15	Pretty Psycho (Amira Blair and Zoe Lucas)	1 August 2025	EVE 137: Hit Me With Your Best Chop	London, England	1 (1, 1)	<1	Blair and Lucas won the match by forfeit. Rhio defended the titles alone.	
16	Lallie (Hollie Barlow and Lana Austin)	1 August 2025	EVE 137: Hit Me With Your Best Chop	London, England	1 (1, 1)	308	This was a three-way tag team match also involving Hard Up North (Harley Hudson and Lucy Sky).	
17	French Art (Cory Zero and JGU)	5 June 2026	EVE 150: History Makers / Rule Breakers	Walthamstow, Greater London	1 (1, 1)	154		
—	Vacated	6 November 2026	EVE 156: EVE For Vendetta	London, England	—	—	Cory Zero and JGU relinquished the title due to Cory not being medically cleared to compete	
18	Hyperactive (Safire Reed and Anita Vaughan)	6 November 2026	EVE 156: EVE For Vendetta	London, England	1 (1, 2)	2	Defeated Hai High Mate (Maika and Hanako) and NyteSkye (Skye Smitson and Violent Nyte) in a three-way tag team match to win the vacant title.	
19	Hai High Mate (Maika and Hanako)	8 November 2026	EVE Elite Encounters II	Wolverhampton, England	1	3+		

== Combined reigns ==
As of November 11, 2026.

†	Indicates the current champion

=== By team ===
Rank	Team	No. of reigns	Combined days
1	Medusa Complex (Charli Evans and Millie McKenzie)	1	756
2	The Uprising (Rhia O'Reilly and Skye Smitson)	2	335
3	Lallie (Hollie Barlow and Lana Austin)	1	308
4	Operation SAS (Skye Smitson and Nightshade)	1	183
5	The Rock and Rome Express (Laura Di Matteo and Rayne Leverkusen)	1	176
6	Hard Up North (Harley Hudson and Lucy Sky)	1	175
7	French Zero (Cory Zero and JGU)	1	154
8	Chantal Jordan and Nina Samuels	1	140
9	The Gals (Debbie Keitel and Anita Vaughan)	1	126
10	Royal Aces (Charlie Morgan and Jetta)	1	109
11	Wrestle Friends (Erin Angel and Jetta)	1	89
12	The Woke Queens (Debbie Keitel and Valkyrie)	1	63
13	Big Beefy Bitches (Emersyn Jayne and Rhio)	1	28
13	Emersyn Jayne and Gisele Shaw	1	28
15	Hai High Mate † (Maika and Hanako)	1	3+
16	Hyperactive (Safire Reed and Anita Vaughan)	1	2
17	The Hex (Allysin Kay and Marti Belle)	1	1
18	Pretty Psycho (Amira Blair and Zoe Lucas)	1	<1

=== By wrestler ===
Rank	Wrestler	No. of reigns	Combined days
1	Charli Evans	1	756
1	Millie McKenzie	1	756
3	Skye Smitson	3	518
4	Rhia O'Reilly	2	335
5	Hollie Barlow	1	308
5	Lana Austin	1	308
7	Jetta	2	198
8	Debbie Keitel	2	189
9	Nightshade	1	183
10	Laura Di Matteo	1	176
10	Rayne Leverkusen	1	176
12	Harley Hudson	1	175
12	Lucy Sky	1	175
14	Cory Zero	1	155
14	JGU	1	155
16	Chantal Jordan	1	140
16	Nina Samuels	1	140
18	Anita Vaughan	2	128
19	Charlie Morgan	1	109
20	Erin Angel	1	89
21	Valkyrie	1	63
22	Emersyn Jayne	2	56
23	Gisele Shaw	1	28
23	Rhio	1	28
25	Maika †	1	3+
25	Hanako †	1	3+
27	Safire Reed	1	2
28	Allysin Kay	1	1
28	Marti Belle	1	1
30	Amira Blair	1	<1
30	Zoe Lucas	1	<1
