= Erin Marshall =

English professional wrestler (born 1987)

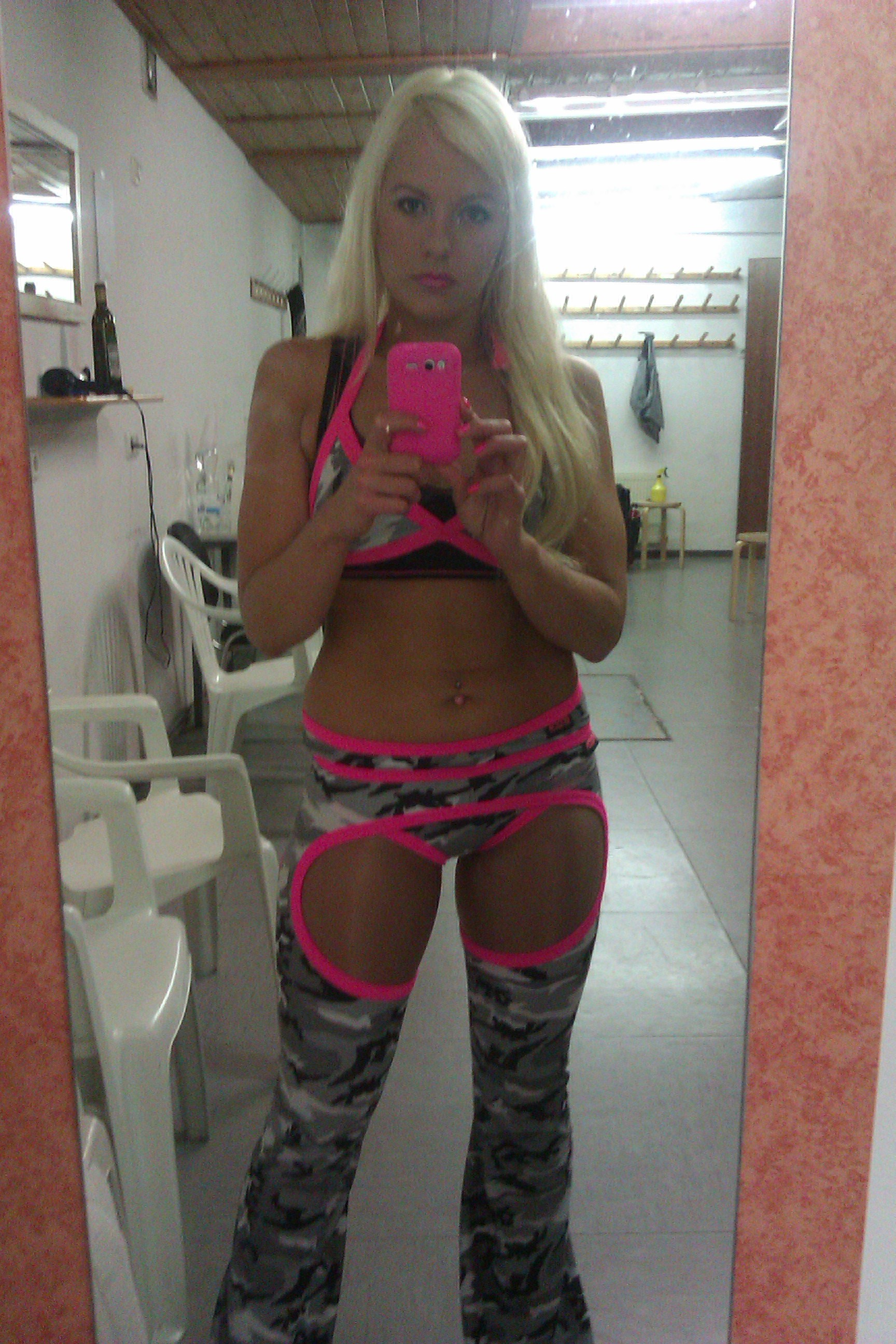

Personal information
- Born: 16 March 1987 (age 39) Southampton, England

Professional wrestling career
- Ring name(s): Erin Angel; Little Angel; Little Erin; Little Miss
- Billed height: 4 ft 11 in (1.50 m)
- Billed weight: 128 lb (58 kg)
- Billed from: Southampton, England
- Trained by: Drew McDonald; Doug Williams; Jonny Storm; Phil Powers
- Debut: 2003

Erin Marshall (born 16 March 1987) is an English professional wrestler, better known by her ring name Erin Angel. She is often nicknamed "Little" due to her short stature of 4 ft 11 in.

Erin Angel describes her gimmick in wrestling as "I'm a little angel...until you cross me!". She works a mixed style of wrestling, as she has been taught in the British old-school style, however she is known to mix this up with new school, and high flying styles. Her ring gear is often pink and made of PVC, she has stated her favorite costume is her chaps set (black with pink).

== Professional wrestling career ==
Erin Marshall was born in Southampton and was trained by Drew McDonald, Doug Williams, Phil Powers, and Jonny Storm. She made her first competitive appearance at the age of 16 in a battle royal. During one of her early Holiday camp tours, she suffered a concussion at the hands of a male wrestler.

The biggest win in Erin Angel's career is considered to be that against the 23 Stone UK female veteran Klondyke Kate, who she beat in a tag contest via disqualification.

Other career highlights include valeting Jake "The Snake" Roberts at a show in Croydon, defeating Simply Luscious when they competed in Erin Angel's hometown of Southampton, and competing in France's Queens of Chaos promotion with some big-name female wrestlers.

While wrestling in Real Quality Wrestling, a promotion run by her trainer Phil Powers, she defeated Nikita; a top female star in the UK. Erin Angel also went on to defeat Ashley Page and Skye in a triple threat match for a chance at RQW's newly created Women's championship. Erin Angel would go on to win this new title after defeating Sweet Saraya at the promotion's A Night of Champions show. Erin Angel was removed as the Women's Champion not long after longtime boyfriend Phil Powers left the company.

Angel appeared in All Star Wrestling, wrestling the likes of Klondyke Kate and Lisa Fury, and later traveled to Canada to wrestle in Atlantic Grand Prix Wrestling.

== Personal life ==
When not wrestling, Erin is a swimming teacher.

== Championships and accomplishments ==
- Bellatrix Female Warriors
  - Bellatrix British Championship (1 time)
- Pro-Wrestling: EVE
  - Pro-Wrestling: EVE Tag Team Championship (1 time) – with Jetta
- Real Quality Wrestling
  - RQW Women's Championship (1 time)
- WrestleForce
  - Wrestleforce Women's Championship (1 time)
