= Bill Martel =

American professional wrestler (born 1986)

Personal information
- Born: Daniel Lewis; October 4, 1986 (age 39) Trenton, Michigan

Professional wrestling career
- Ring name: Bill Martel
- Billed height: 5 ft 11 in (1.80 m)
- Billed weight: 201 lb (91 kg)
- Billed from: Philadelphia, Pennsylvania; Nashville, Tennessee
- Trained by: Mathew Priest; Roughhouse R.O.B. Breyer Wellington; Truth Martini
- Debut: August 5, 2007
- Retired: February 16, 2013

Daniel Lewis (born October 4, 1986) is an American professional wrestler, better known by his ring name Bill Martel. He is best known for his time in Juggalo Championship Wrestling (JCW). He primarily wrestled for several Midwest independent promotions, including JCW.

== Career ==
=== Blue Collar Wrestling Alliance (2007–2011) ===
Lewis first became involved in the wrestling business in 2007. He started wrestling for the Blue Collar Wrestling Alliance out of Detroit, MI. At this point he started working with Mathew Priest in a faction called Ascendency. Together they teamed up and called themselves Super Team. The two learned from one another with Priest in the mentor role initially. Priest and Martel would later both be assistant trainers to Breyer Wellington in his wrestling school. After a couple months in the business, Lewis won his first championship, the BCWA Midwest Championship which he later renamed the National Championship. From there he was able to win the companies Heavyweight Championship a record 7 times over the next 4 years. His last match with the company took place on July 24, 2011 where he was defeated in a Fatal Fourway defending the Heavyweight Championship against Cyrus Parker, The Darkstar Logan, and Tony Banks. Over the 4 years and near 200 shows with the company he became a decorated wrestler by having Match of the Year, Feud of the Year, and Wrestler of the Year awards. He worked several other promotions throughout Michigan during this time as well, but his primary home was in BCWA.

=== Main-Event Championship Wrestling (2010–present) ===
Lewis took his talents to MCW in Alliance, OH in the summer of 2010. After several months of hard work he caught the eye of Minka Murder who recruited him to team with Big Hurt in the inaugural MCW Tag Team Championship Tournament. Murder Inc, lost in the semifinals of the tournament but have become quite the force in MCW. As Murder Inc, has dominated MCW and started a rivalry with former member Christian Vaughn. Martel has challenged Tommy Dreamer and Carlito during the fall months of 2011. In March 2012, Martel challenged Matt Hardy at the MCW XII Anniversary show.

=== Juggalo Championship Wrestling (2011-Present) ===
In March 2011, Corporal Robinson, Violent J, and 2 Tuff Tony scouted Lewis at a BCWA show. They recruited and signed him to be a part of the growing JCW roster. He made his debut on March 12, against Sal The Man of 1000 Gimmicks at Hardcore Hell. Two weeks later he found a partner to take on JCW Tag Team Champions Necro Butcher and Mad Man Pondo. Martel and his partner Trainwreck took their talent to Milwaukee coming up short against the Ring Rydas at Hatchet Attacks. After these events Martel was becoming upset at the antics he saw in the company. Martel called himself a "serious professional" and the "Superstar" would become upset with foul language and graphic obscenities. He was looking to clean up JCW's act for iPPV's and bring a PG feel to the company. Eventually, Martel became a mainstay in the company wrestling Sal The Man of 1000 Gimmicks at the annual Gathering of the Juggalos. Martel wrestled his final match as a professional wrestler in February 2013. He was defeated by former WWE Intercontinental Champion The Honky Tonk Man in a Guitar Match.

== Championships and accomplishments ==
- Blue Collar Wrestling Alliance
  - BCWA Heavyweight Championship (7 Times)
  - BCWA National Championship (1 Time)
  - Wrestler of the Year (1 Time) 2009
  - Match of the Year (3 Time) 2008 with Mathew Priest, 2009 with Zane Silver and Cyrus Parker, 2010 with Major Money
  - Feud of the Year (1 Time)
  - Golden Tongue Award
  - Most Devastating Move
- Blue Pain Pro Wrestling
  - BPPW National Heavyweight Championship (1 Time)
- Combat Castle Wrestling
  - CCW Heavyweight Championship (3 Times)
  - CCW International Championship (1 Time)
  - CCW Hardcore Championship (3 Times)
- Outlaw Pro Wrestling
  - OPW Tag Team Championship (1 Time) with Aiden Hallows
