= Marti Belle =

Dominican- American professional wrestler

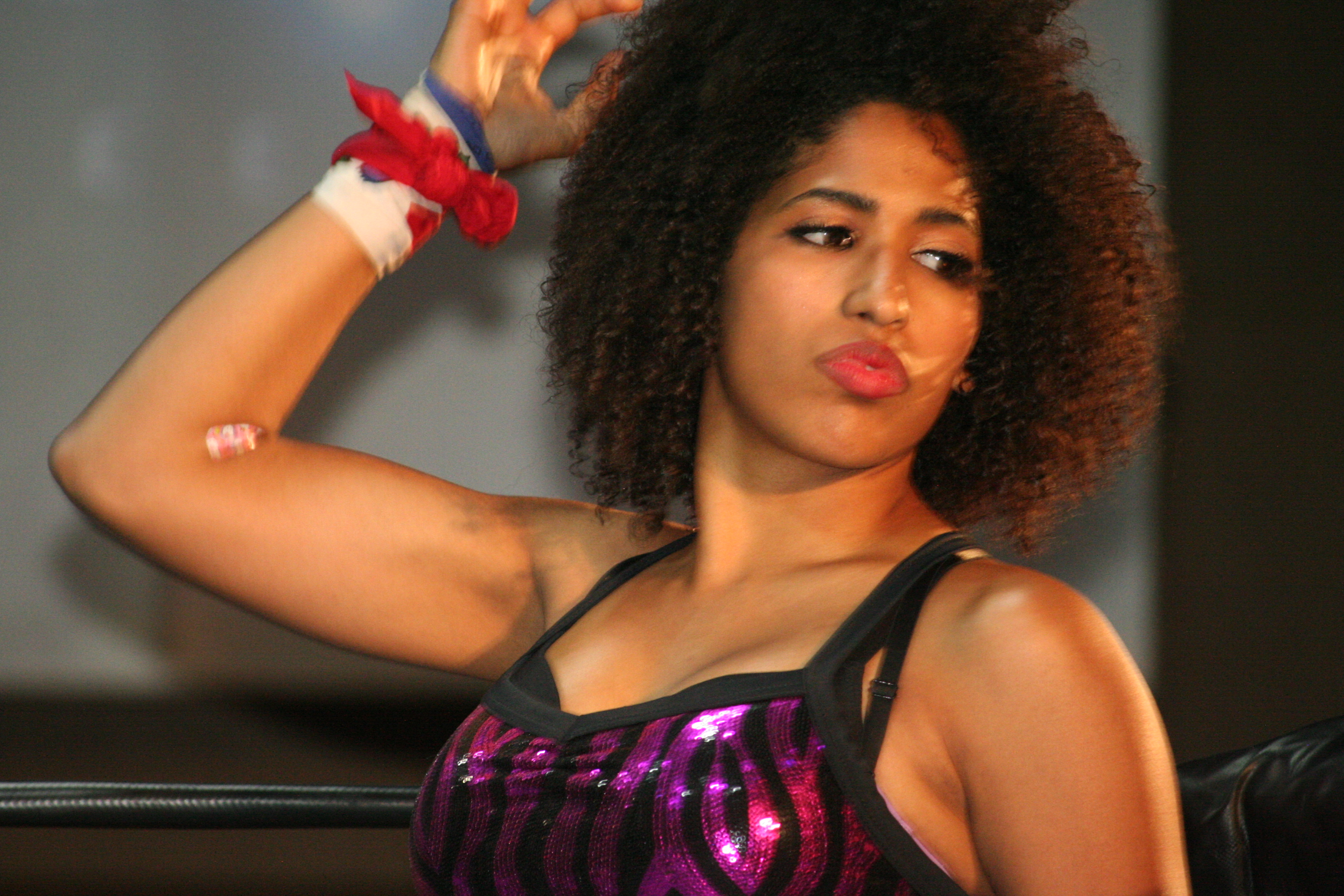
- Belle in 2013

Personal information
- Born: Martibel Payano; August 7, 1988 (age 38) New York City, New York, U.S.

Professional wrestling career
- Ring name(s): Marti Bell; Marti Belle; Izzy Belle
- Billed height: 5 ft 4 in (1.63 m)
- Billed from: Dominican Republic; New York City
- Trained by: Johnny Rodz
- Debut: 2008

Martibel Payano (born August 7, 1988) is an American professional wrestler, best known working under the ring name Marti Belle. She is best known for her time with the National Wrestling Alliance (NWA), where she is a two-time NWA World Women's Tag Team Champion. She also competes on the American independent circuit under the ring name for promotions including Evolve, Shimmer Women Athletes, Shine Wrestling and Women Superstars Uncensored (WSU), for which she is a former WSU Spirit Champion and a two–time WSU Tag Team Champion.

== Professional wrestling career ==
=== Early career (2008–2009) ===
On June 12, 2008, Belle debuted for World of Unpredictable Wrestling as Tristan Spade's valet. She made her wrestling debut on November 7, 2009, for World of Unpredictable Wrestling, where she faced Tina San Antonio and Sweet Pea in a match that ended in a triple count-out.

=== Women Superstars Uncensored (2010–2014) ===
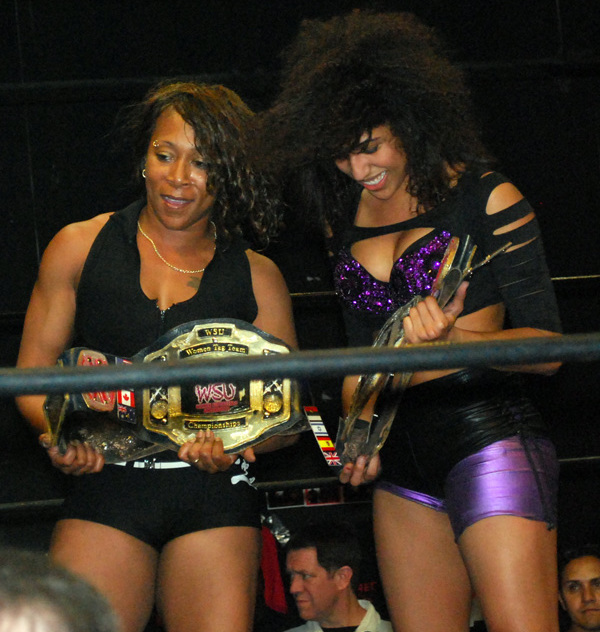
Belle (right) and Jazz as the WSU Tag Team Champions in March 2011

Belle debuted for Women Superstars Uncensored on March 6, 2010, teaming with Tina San Antonio in a losing effort to The Boston Shore (Amber and Lexxus). On April 2, Belle competed in the WSU J-Cup Tournament, where she lost in the first round to Brittney Savage. The next day, Belle teamed with Danny Demanto competed in the WSU King & Queen Tournament, losing to Devon Moore and Alicia. On June 26, Belle competed in the Uncensored Rumble III match, which was won by Jazz. On November 26, Belle and Tina San Antonio, collectively known as The Belle Saints, defeated Cindy Rogers and Jana to become the WSU Tag Team Champions, and they would defeat Jamilia Craft and Jennifer Cruz on the same night to retain the titles for the first time. At WSU's 4th Anniversary Show, Belle retained the tag titles with Jazz as her partner replacing Tina (who was injured before the event) in a three-way match against The Soul Sisters (Jana and Luscious Latasha) and The Cosmo Club (Cindy Rogers and Amy Lee). On May 27, Belle lost the championships to The Boston Shore. On April 14, 2012, Belle unsuccessfully challenged Jessicka Havok for the WSU Spirit Championship. On June 16, Belle defeated Havok to win the WSU Spirit Championship. She also competed in the Uncensored Rumble match, which was won by Lexxus. At Full Steam Ahead on October 13, Belle had her first successful title defense against Nikki Addams. Belle had another successful title defense against Ezavel Suena on October 12, 2013, but she would be attacked by Suena after the match, leading Belle to challenge Suena to a Title vs Mask rematch. At Mutiny on February 8, 2014, Belle lost the title to Suena, who later unmasked and revealed herself as the villainous Niya. Belle's reign lasted 602 days, which is the longest in WSU Spirit Championship history.

=== Independent circuit (2010–present) ===
Belle debuted for Evolve on September 8, 2012, in a losing effort to Christina Von Eerie. On December 8, Belle was defeated by Larry Dallas and Papadon in a 2-on-1 handicap match. On November 16, 2012, Belle lost to Niya in her debut for Shine Wrestling. Also in 2012, Belle wrestled for Ring of Honor and Pro Wrestling Syndicate. Belle wrestled a dark match for Shimmer Women Athletes on April 12, 2013, in a 6-person tag team match, and on the following day where she lost to Angelus Layne. She made her televised debut at Shimmer Volume 64 in a losing effort to Christina Von Eerie. She earned her first singles victory with Shimmer on October 18 over Solo Darling.

=== Total Nonstop Action Impact ! Wrestling ===
==== Knockouts Knockdown (2014) ====
Belle initially appeared at the company's Knockouts Knockdown 2 pay-per-view on May 10, 2014, where she defeated ODB.

==== The Dollhouse (2015-2016) ====
In April 2015, TNA began airing vignettes promoting "The Dollhouse" (Belle and Jade)'s debut, in which Belle's ring name was extended to Marti Bell. Jade and Bell debuted on the TKO: Night of Knockouts edition of Impact Wrestling on April 24 portraying unstable, childlike characters, where Jade lost to Laura Dennis by disqualification after they attacked referee Brian Stiffler and ring announcer Christy Hemme. Later that night, Jade and Bell helped Taryn Terrell retain her TNA Knockouts Championship against Awesome Kong, with Terrell joining The Dollhouse in the process. The Dollhouse wrestled their first match as a team on the May 8 episode of Impact Wrestling, where they defeated Awesome Kong and Gail Kim in a 3–on–2 handicap match. Bell and Jade would regularly interfere in Terrell's championship matches and ensure the win for her. At Slammiversary XIII, The Dollhouse lost to Awesome Kong and Brooke in another 3-on-2 handicap match. After Terrell lost the TNA Knockouts Championship to Brooke, Bell challenged Brooke for the championship on the July 29 episode of Impact Wrestling, where she lost after a distraction from Gail Kim. On the Turning Point special episode of Impact Wrestling on August 19, Bell and Jade competed in a 2-on-1 handicap six sides of steel cage match against Gail Kim, which Kim would win.

==== Singles competition (2016–2017) ====
In 2016, The Dollhouse officially disbanded after the three members turned on each other following Jade winning the Knockouts Championship. At TNA Slammiversary 2016, Marti returned during a TNA Knockouts Championship match involving Jade, Gail Kim and Sienna. Marti ended up hitting Jade in the back with a telescoping baton, costing her the championship to Sienna and starting a program between the two former Dollhouse members. Marti would eventually enter in the Knockouts title scene starting the following month in which she competed on the July 12th live special edition of Impact Wrestling, Destination X, in which she would be involved in a fatal four-way match for the Knockouts title against Jade, Gail Kim, and defending champion Sienna in losing effort; she also debuted a new finisher. Marti would continue to involve herself in the championship scene the following months competing against aforementioned also Madison Rayne, and Allie for the TNA Knockouts Championship; she would also be involved in a gauntlet match on September 15 for which turned to be her final match in the company although she competed against Madison Rayne in a No Disqualification match at One Night Only: September 2016 in a winning effort. at One Night Only: Against All Odds (2016), Belle competed in a Three-way match which was won by Jade.

On January 18, 2017, it was reported that Payano's contract with TNA had expired and that she had left the company.

=== WWE (2017) ===
On July 12, 2017, WrestleTalk TV revealed that Payano and several others will be competing in WWE's upcoming show Mae Young Classic. The following day, she was eliminated from the tournament in the first round by Rachel Evers. She then appeared in a dark match, on July 14, 2017, in a six-woman tag team match teaming with Santana Garrett and Sarah Logan versus Jazzy Gabert, Kay Lee Ray and Tessa Blanchard.

=== National Wrestling Alliance (2019–2020; 2021; 2026-present) ===
On May 12, 2019, Belle returned to ROH where she unsuccessfully challenged Allysin Kay for the NWA World Women's Championship. With National Wrestling Alliance (NWA) producing their weekly internet program, Belle made her debut on the October 22 of episode NWA Power, where she was victorious over Crystal Rose. On the November 5 episode of NWA Power, Belle, who felt disrespected by Kay for saying she isn't ready for the championship, aligned herself with Thunder Rosa by attacking Kay, turning heel in the process. On November 17, 2020, Belle announced her departure from NWA.

In August 2021, NWA announced the return of Belle alongside Allysin Kay, going by the team name The Hex, to participate at NWA EmPowerrr, on August 28, in a tournament to crown the new NWA World Women's Tag Team Champions. At the event, The Hex defeated Red Velvet and KiLynn King in a tournament final to win the revived titles. On the October 26 episode of Powerrr, THe Hex had their first successful against the team of Jennacide and Paola Blaze. The Hex also defended their championship on Ring of Honor (ROH) during the October 27 edition of Women's Division Wednesday, by successfully defeating The Allüre (Angelina Love and Mandy Leon). On June 11, 2022, at Alwayz Ready, The Hex lost the World Women's Tag Team Championship to Pretty Empowered (Ella Envy and Kenzie Paige), ending their reign at 287 days.

On an episode of NWA Powerrr that aired 10 February 2026, The Hex defeated Tiffany Nieves and Valentina Rossi to regain the NWA World Women's Tag Team Titles. They held the titles until the June 13 episode of NWA Power, losing the titles to Pretty Empowered in a triple threat match that also featured Clara Carter and "Hollyhood" Haley J.

=== Ring of Honor (2021) ===
During year 2021 Marti Belle made her Ring of Honor (ROH) debut and entered the Inaugural ROH Women's World Championship tournament but lost to Trish Adora in the first round via submission.

=== Return to Total Nonstop Action Wrestling (2023) ===
On January 20, 2023, Belle alongside Allysin Kay, returned to Impact Wrestling accompanied by Father James Mitchell attacking Rosemary, Jessicka and Taya Valkyrie. At No Surrender, The Hex was unsuccessful at winning the Impact Knockouts World Tag Team Championship from The Death Dollz.

=== Return to Ring of Honor (2023–present) ===
On October 14, 2023, Belle returned to Ring of Honor in a losing match against Mercedes Martinez. On April 18, 2024, she lost to Lady Frost.

== Personal life ==
Belle is of Dominican descent.

== Championships and accomplishments ==
- American Pro Wrestling Alliance
  - APWA World Ladies Championship (1 time)
- Heroes and Legends Wrestling
  - HLW Women's Championship (1 time)
- National Wrestling Alliance
  - NWA World Women's Tag Team Championship (2 times) – with Allysin Kay
  - NWA World Women's Tag Team Championship Tournament (2021) – with Allysin Kay
- New York Wrestling Connection
  - NYWC Starlet Championship (1 time)
- Pro-Wrestling: EVE
  - Pro-Wrestling: EVE Tag Team Championship (1 time) – with Allysin Kay
- Pro Wrestling Illustrated
  - Ranked No. 32 of the top 50 female wrestlers in the PWI Female 50 in 2016
  - Ranked No. 9 of the top 100 tag teams in the PWI Tag Team 100 of 2022 with Allysin Kay
- Shine Wrestling
  - Shine Tag Team Championship (3 times) – with Jayme Jameson (2) and Allysin Kay (1)
- Women Superstars Uncensored
  - WSU Tag Team Championship (1 time) – with Jazz and Tina San Antonio
  - WSU Spirit Championship (1 time)
- World Class Revolution
  - WCR Diamond Division Championship (1 time)
