= Ariel Teal Toombs =

American professional wrestler

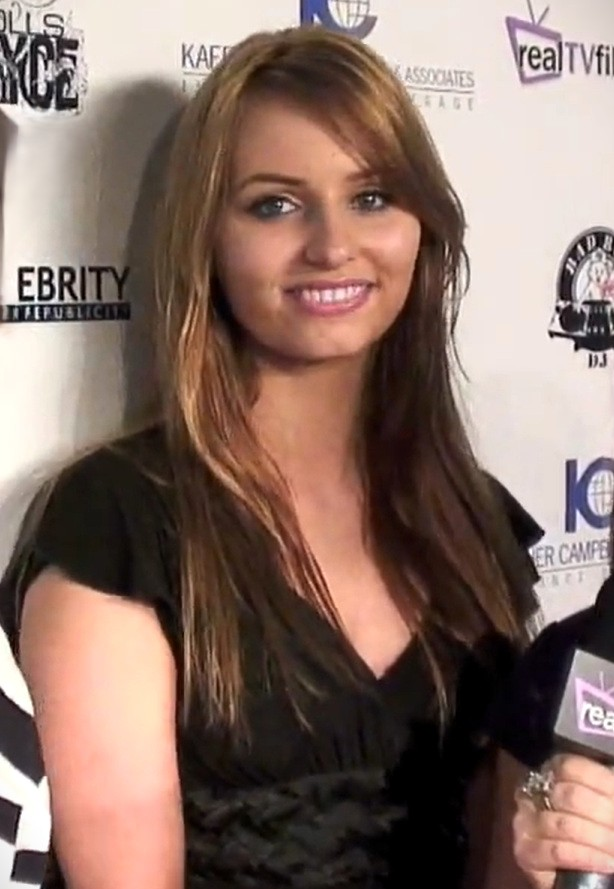
- Toombs in 2009
- Born: Ariel Teal Toombs; June 7, 1985 (age 41); Hillsboro, Oregon, U.S.
- Education: American Musical and Dramatic Academy
- Occupations: Actress, professional wrestler
- Years active: 2008–present
- Partner: Deimos (fiancé)
- Parent: Roddy Piper (father)
- Professional wrestling career
- Ring name: Teal Piper
- Billed height: 5 ft 7 in (170 cm)
- Trained by: Selina Majors; Tessa Blanchard
- Debut: August 31, 2019

Ariel Teal Toombs (born June 7, 1985) is an American actress and professional wrestler, also known by the ring name Teal Piper. She is the daughter of the professional wrestler and actor Roddy Piper.

== Acting career ==
After graduating from high school in Oregon, Toombs relocated to Los Angeles, California, to work in the entertainment industry. She graduated from the American Musical and Dramatic Academy. She made her acting debut in the 2006 film Shut Up and Shoot!. She appeared alongside her father in the films Lights Out and The Portal. Her roles have included an episode of CSI: NY.

== Professional wrestling career ==
In 2016–2017, Toombs was named as a potential roster member for a new women's wrestling promotion featuring the daughters of professional wrestlers planned to be launched by Brooke Hogan.

Toombs trained as a wrestler under Selina Majors and Tessa Blanchard in the Women of Wrestling promotion in Long Beach, California. She made her professional wrestling debut on August 31, 2019, with All Elite Wrestling, competing in a Casino Battle Royale at the All Out pay-per-view under the ring name "Teal Piper". That same month, it was reported that she had signed to appear on season two of the Women of Wrestling program WOW Superheroes, which aired on AXS TV in late 2019. On WOW Superheroes, Piper hosted a talk show segment titled "Teal Talks".

In 2020, Piper trained with Ronda Rousey ahead of Rousey's return to professional wrestling. In 2021 and 2022, she wrestled for various independent promotions in Alabama, Florida, and Mississippi, occasionally teaming with her fiancé Deimos as "House of Heathens". In September 2022, she appeared in Athens, Greece for ZMAK Wrestling. In January 2023, Piper returned to AEW, teaming with Kel in a loss to Anna Jay A.S. and Tay Melo on an episode of AEW Dark. She debuted in Ring of Honor in June 2023, losing to Diamante on an episode of Ring of Honor Wrestling. In August 2023, she defeated Allysin Kay and Leva Bates in a three way match to win the Atomic Legacy Wrestling Women's Championship.

Piper loaned WWE her father's kilt, sporran, bagpipes, chain from Starrcade '83: A Flare for the Gold, and boxing shorts from WrestleMania 2 for display at the "Fan Experience" at the January 2024 Royal Rumble. The exchange was featured on an episode of WWE's Most Wanted Treasures that aired in June 2023.

In May 2025, Piper wrestled for Shine Wrestling at its Shine 82 pay-per-view, defeating Kaci Lennox. In September 2025, she defeated Amber Nova for the Monsters Wrestling Orlando Women's Championship in a bout promoted by Pro Wrestling Action. In November 2025, she wrestled at Shine 84, losing to Evie De La Rosa. In December 2025, Piper debuted in the National Wrestling Alliance (NWA), teaming with Herra to defeat Pretty Empowered in a bout that aired on episode 243 of NWA Powerrr in February 2026. In March 2026, she wrestled her first match in Puerto Rico with the International Wrestling Association.

== Slap fighting career ==
Piper made her slap fighting debut with Power Slap at its "Power Slap 19: Da Hawaiian Hitman vs. Manu" event on April 19, 2026 in Las Vegas, facing Dani Mo in a featherweight bout. Mo won the bout by unanimous decision.

== Filmography ==
Year	Title	Role	Notes
2006	Shut Up and Shoot!	Ariel	Film
2006	Costa Chica: Confession of an Exorcist	Tatiana McMurter	Film
2008	Beverley Hills Massacre	Casey Jones	Film
2008	Psycho Sleepover	Sally	Film
2010	Lights Out	Linda	Film
2010	Little *ucker	Molly	Film
2010	The Portal	Nurse Lucy	Film
2011	Beneath the Top Hat	Marianne	Short film
2012	CSI: NY	Businesswoman	Television (episode: "Sláinte")
2012	Hell's Belles	Adria Blackmoor	Short film
2019	Average Bloke	Bagpipes Girl	Film

== Professional wrestling style and persona ==
Piper's signature moves are a sleeper hold and an eye poke. While appearing with Women of Wrestling, her character was described as having a "penchant for shenanigans" and as having "a habit of being at the center of misunderstandings, and somehow always followed by mischief".

== Personal life ==
Toombs is the daughter of professional wrestler and actor Roddy Toombs (1954–2015), better known as "Roddy Piper". Following her father's death, Toombs and her brother Colt Baird Toombs worked together to complete and posthumously publish her father's autobiography, Rowdy: The Roddy Piper Story. She became engaged to her partner Michael Anderson (who was trained to wrestle by Roddy Piper, performing as Deimos) in December 2020. Roddy Piper stated that he (and, by extension, his daughter) was a cousin of the Hart wrestling family.

== Championships and accomplishments ==
- Atomic Legacy Wrestling
  - ALW Hype Women's Championship (1 time)
  - ALW Women's Championship (1 time)
- Go Wrestle
  - GW Women's Championship (1 time)
- Monsters Wrestling Orlando
  - MWO Women's Championship (1 time)
