= Shine Wrestling events =

Professional wrestling events held by Shine Wrestling

Shine Wrestling is an all-female professional wrestling promotion which was founded in mid–2012. Over the course since, it has held more than 81 internet pay-per-views.

== Shine 1 ==
Shine 1
- Promotion: Shine Wrestling
- Date: July 21, 2012
- City: Ybor City, Florida
- Venue: The Orpheum

No.	Results	Stipulations	Times
1	Veda Scott defeated Kimberly	Singles match	7:16
2	Santana defeated Tina San Antonio	Singles match	5:25
3	Made in Sin (Allysin Kay and Taylor Made) defeated West Coast Connection (Su Yung and Tracy Taylor)	Tag team match	13:32
4	Christina Von Eerie defeated Cherry Bomb	Singles match	8:06
5	Reby Sky defeated Jayme Jameson	Singles match	9:14
6	Mercedes Martinez defeated Leva Bates	Singles match	8:10
7	Rain defeated Nikki Roxx	Singles match	15:32
8	Jazz defeated Sara Del Rey	Singles match	23:32

== Shine 2 ==
Shine 2
- Promotion: Shine Wrestling
- Date: August 17, 2012
- City: Ybor City, Florida
- Venue: The Orpheum

No.	Results	Stipulations	Times
1	Su Yung defeated Kimberly	Singles match	5:13
2	Sojournor Bolt defeated Heidi Lovelace and Taeler Hendrix	Three-way match	7:17
3	Mia Yim defeated Sassy Stephie	Singles match	10:27
4	Jessicka Havok defeated Reby Sky	Singles match	9:36
5	Rain defeated Santana Garrett	Singles match	6:40
6	Leva Bates defeated Portia Perez	Singles match	8:54
7	Made in Sin (Allysin Kay and Taylor Made) defeated MsEerie (Christina Von Eerie and MsChif)	Tag team match	12:20
8	Jazz vs. Mercedes Martinez ended in a no–contest	Singles match	10:41

== Shine 3 ==
Shine 3
- Promotion: Shine Wrestling
- Date: September 21, 2012
- City: Ybor City, Florida
- Venue: The Orpheum

No.	Results	Stipulations	Times
1	Santana defeated Sienna DuVall	Singles match	5:43
2	Leva Bates defeated Kimberly	Singles match	8:25
3	The West Coast Connection (Su Yung and Tracy Taylor) defeated Rainbow Bright (Gabby Gilbert and Luscious Latasha)	Tag team match	10:00
4	Taylor Made (with Allysin Kay and April Hunter) defeated Greek Barbie	Singles match	6:40
5	Jayme Jameson defeated Mercedes Martinez	Singles match	10:45
6	Jessicka Havok defeated Mia Yim	Singles match	11:11
7	Allysin Kay (with April Hunter and Taylor Made) defeated Christina Von Eerie	Singles match	9:04
8	Jazz defeated Rain	Singles match	15:41

== Shine 4 ==
Shine 4
- Promotion: Shine Wrestling
- Date: October 19, 2012
- City: Ybor City, Florida
- Venue: The Orpheum

No.	Results	Stipulations	Times
1	Su Yung defeated Rhia O'Reilly	Singles match	6:27
2	Brandi Wine defeated Kimberly	Singles match	9:56
3	Reby Sky defeated Kellie Skater	Singles match	11:55
4	Rain defeated Christina Von Eerie	Singles match	9:05
5	Made in Sin (Allysin Kay and Taylor Made) (with April Hunter) defeated Davina Rose and Shazza McKenzie	Tag team match	12:18
6	Mercedes Martinez defeated Santana	Singles match	5:59
7	Jessicka Havok defeated Leva Bates	Singles match	10:44
8	Saraya Knight (c) defeated Jazz	Singles match for the Shimmer Championship	13:36
(c) / – the champion(s) heading into the match

== Shine 5 ==
Shine 5
- Promotion: Shine Wrestling
- Date: November 16, 2012
- City: Ybor City, Florida
- Venue: The Orpheum

No.	Results	Stipulations	Times
1	Sassy Stephie defeated Heidi Lovelace	Singles match	6:09
2	Niya defeated Marti Belle	Singles match	8:00
3	Su Yung defeated Sojournor Bolt	Singles match	9:32
4	Santana defeated Nikki St. John	Singles match	6:19
5	Made in Sin (Allysin Kay and Taylor Made) (with April Hunter) defeated Kimberly and Leva Bates	Tag team match	14:59
6	Athena defeated Ivelisse	Singles match	9:38
7	Jessicka Havok vs. Nikki Roxx ended in a double count out	Singles match	12:05
8	Amazing Kong and Jazz defeated Mercedes Martinez and Rain	Tag Team match	17:06

== Shine 6 ==
Shine 6
- Promotion: Shine Wrestling
- Date: January 11, 2013
- City: Ybor City, Florida
- Venue: The Orpheum

No.	Results	Stipulations	Times
1	Mia Yim defeated Tina San Antonio	Singles match	6:31
2	Santana defeated Leah Von Dutch	Singles match	6:27
3	Nikki Roxx defeated Kimber Lee	Singles match	7:34
4	MsEerie (Christina Von Eerie and MsChif) defeated Made in Sin (Allysin Kay and Taylor Made) (with April Hunter)	Tag team match	8:56
5	Ivelisse defeated Su Yung	Singles match	9:26
6	Jessicka Havok defeated Reby Sky	Singles match	10:32
7	Kimberly defeated Leva Bates	Singles match	8:49
8	Mercedes Martinez defeated Amazing Kong	Singles match	12:27

== Shine 7 ==
Shine 7
- Promotion: Shine Wrestling
- Date: February 22, 2013
- City: Ybor City, Florida
- Venue: The Orpheum

No.	Results	Stipulations	Times
1	Brittney Savage defeated Heidi Lovelace	Singles match	5:08
2	Tina San Antonio defeated La Rosa Negra and Luscious Latasha	Three-way match	5:32
3	Santana defeated Jessie Belle	Singles match	8:10
4	Ivelisse defeated LuFisto	Singles match	15:27
5	Valkyrie (Allysin Kay, April Hunter and Taylor Made) defeated Mia Yim, Su Yung and Tracy Taylor	Six-woman tag team match	10:25
6	Nikki Roxx defeated Mercedes Martinez	Singles match	11:20
7	Leva Bates defeated Kimberly	Last woman standing match	12:37
8	Rain (with Allysin Kay, April Hunter, Ivelisse and Taylor Made) defeated Amazing Kong by disqualification	Singles match	8:11

== Shine 8 ==
Shine 8
- Promotion: Shine Wrestling
- Date: March 23, 2013
- City: Ybor City, Florida
- Venue: The Orpheum

No.	Results	Stipulations	Times
1	Nikki St. John defeated Luscious Latasha	Singles match	3:41
2	Su Yung defeated Brittney Savage	Singles match	8:44
3	Jayme Jameson defeated Brandi Wine (with Malia Hosaka)	Singles match	9:50
4	Santana defeated Sojournor Bolt	Singles match	9:46
5	Mercedes Martinez defeated Nikki Roxx	Singles match	12:31
6	Kimberly defeated Leva Bates	Fans bring the weapons "I Quit" match	16:11
7	Reby Sky defeated Jessicka Havok	Career vs. Respect match	12:15
8	Valkyrie (Allysin Kay, Ivelisse, Rain and Taylor Made) defeated Amazing Kong, Angelina Love, Christina Von Eerie and Mia Yim	Eight-woman tag team match	19:38

== Shine 9 ==
Shine 9
- Promotion: Shine Wrestling
- Date: April 19, 2013
- City: Ybor City, Florida
- Venue: The Orpheum

No.	Results	Stipulations	Times
1	Allysin Kay (with April Hunter) defeated Courtney Rush	Singles match	11:33
2	Saraya Knight defeated Su Yung	Shine Championship tournament qualifying match	9:47
3	Rhia O'Reilly defeated Brittney Savage and Solo Darling	Three-way match	6:49
4	Rain (with April Hunter) defeated Angelina Love	Shine Championship tournament qualifying match	8:00
5	Jessie McKay, Kellie Skater and Shazza McKenzie defeated Mia Yim, Nikki Roxx and Santana	Six-woman tag team match	11:55
6	Jessicka Havok defeated Madison Eagles	Shine Championship tournament qualifying match	12:40
7	Mercedes Martinez defeated Evie	Singles match	10:40
8	Jazz defeated Ivelisse (with April Hunter)	Shine Championship tournament qualifying match	11:52
9	Leva Bates defeated Kimberly	Steel Cage Weapons match	13:55

== Shine 10 ==
Shine 10
- Promotion: Shine Wrestling
- Date: May 24, 2013
- City: Ybor City, Florida
- Venue: The Orpheum

No.	Results	Stipulations	Times
1	Allysin Kay (with April Hunter and Taylor Made) defeated Nikki Roxx	Shine Championship tournament qualifying match	7:22
2	Ivelisse (with April Hunter) defeated Amber O'Neal	Singles match	8:07
3	Santana defeated Kimberly	Shine Championship tournament qualifying match	8:44
4	Jessie Belle, Sassy Stephie and Sojournor Bolt defeated Heidi Lovelace, Luscious Latasha and Solo Darling	Six-woman tag team match	10:52
5	Leva Bates defeated Taylor Made (with Allysin Kay and April Hunter)	Shine Championship tournament qualifying match	10:15
6	Mia Yim defeated Mercedes Martinez	Shine Championship tournament qualifying match	9:36
7	Jessicka Havok defeated Portia Perez	Shine Championship tournament qualifying match	11:35
8	Angelina Love defeated Rain	Singles match	11:35

== Shine 11 ==
Shine 11
- Promotion: Shine Wrestling
- Date: July 12, 2013
- City: Ybor City, Florida
- Venue: The Orpheum

No.	Results	Stipulations	Times
1	LuFisto defeated Mercedes Martinez and Nikki Roxx (with Daffney) and Su Yung	Shine Championship tournament qualifying Four-way match	8:38
2	Ivelisse (with April Hunter) defeated Amazing Kong and Angelina Love and Kimberly	Shine Championship tournament qualifying Four-way match	7:16
3	Jessicka Havok defeated Saraya Knight by disqualification	Shine Championship tournament first round match	14:38
4	Mia Yim defeated Leva Bates	Shine Championship tournament first round match	13:38
5	Rain (with April Hunter) defeated LuFisto	Shine Championship tournament first round match	8:23
6	Ivelisse (with April Hunter) defeated Santana (with Amber O'Neal)	Shine Championship tournament first round match	12:16
7	Rain (with April Hunter) defeated Jessicka Havok by count out	Shine Championship tournament semi-finals match	11:03
8	Mia Yim defeated Ivelisse (with April Hunter)	Shine Championship tournament semi-finals match	11:12
9	Rain defeated Mia Yim	Tournament final for the inaugural Shine Championship	14:38

== Shine 12 ==
Shine 12
- Promotion: Shine Wrestling
- Date: August 23, 2013
- City: Ybor City, Florida
- Venue: The Orpheum

No.	Results	Stipulations
1	All Star Squad (Nikki Roxx and Solo Darling) defeated The West Coast Connection (Su Yung and Tracy Taylor)	Tag team match
2	Leva Bates defeated Christina Von Eerie by disqualification	Singles match
3	Kimberly defeated Kimber Lee	Singles match
4	Jessicka Havok defeated Ivelisse and Mia Yim	Three-way match to determine the number one contenders for the Shine Championship
5	Leva Bates defeated Christina Von Eerie by disqualification	Singles match
6	Brandi Wine vs. Santana ended in a no contest	Singles match
7	Amber O'Neal and Santana defeated Brandi Wine and Malia Hosaka	Tag team match
8	Amazing Kong defeated Mercedes Martinez	Singles match
9	Angelina Love defeated Shanna	Singles match
10	Rain (c) defeated Jessicka Havok	Singles match for the Shine Championship
(c) / – the champion(s) heading into the match

== Shine 13 ==
Shine 13
- Promotion: Shine Wrestling
- Date: September 27, 2013
- City: Ybor City, Florida
- Venue: The Orpheum

No.	Results	Stipulations	Times
1	Su Yung defeated La Rosa Negra, Taeler Hendrix and Xandra Bale	Four-way match	3:27
2	Nikki Roxx (with Daffney) defeated Leah Von Dutch	Singles match	11:57
3	The S-N-S Express (Jessie Belle and Sassy Stephie) defeated The American Sweethearts (Amber O'Neal and Santana)	Tag team match	9:06
4	Mercedes Martinez defeated Solo Darling	Singles match	6:44
5	Nevaeh defeated Leva Bates	Singles match	10:09
6	Mia Yim defeated Nikki Storm	Singles match	12:34
7	Valkyrie (Allysin Kay and Ivelisse) defeated Amazing Kong and Jessicka Havok	Tag team match	11:20
8	Rain (c) defeated Angelina Love	Singles match for the Shine Championship	12:26
(c) / – the champion(s) heading into the match

== Shine 14 ==
Shine 14
- Promotion: Shine Wrestling
- Date: October 25, 2013
- City: Ybor City, Florida
- Venue: The Orpheum

No.	Results	Stipulations	Times
1	Solo Darling (with Daffney) defeated Su Yung	Singles match	6:52
2	Mia Yim defeated Savannah Summers and Shanna	Three-way match	8:41
3	Nikki Storm defeated Nikki Roxx (with Daffney)	Singles match	8:28
4	The S-N-S Express (Jessie Belle, Nevaeh and Sassy Stephie) defeated The American Sweethearts (Amber O'Neal and Santana) and Leva Bates	Six-woman tag team match	10:30
5	Kimberly defeated Mercedes Martinez by disqualification	Singles match	8:10
6	The Global Green Gangsters (Kellie Skater and Tomoka Nakagawa) (c) defeated Allysin Kay and Ivelisse	Tag team match for the Shimmer Tag Team Championship	14:51
7	Amazing Kong defeated Madison Eagles	Singles match	12:24
8	Saraya Knight defeated Jessicka Havok (with Allysin Kay)	Last Woman Standing match	10:33
9	Rain (c) defeated Hiroyo Matsumoto	Singles match for the Shine Championship	14:45
(c) / – the champion(s) heading into the match

== Shine 15 ==
Shine 15
- Promotion: Shine Wrestling
- Date: December 13, 2013
- City: Ybor City, Florida
- Venue: The Orpheum

No.	Results	Stipulations	Times
1	Su Yung defeated Solo Darling	Singles match	5:33
2	Sojournor Bolt defeated La Rosa Negra	Singles match	8:07
3	Mercedes Martinez defeated Heidi Lovelace	Singles match	7:20
4	Angelina Love defeated Taylor Made	Singles match	13:10
5	Leva Bates defeated Nevaeh	Hardcore match	11:28
6	The S-N-S Express (Jessie Belle and Sassy Stephie) defeated The American Sweethearts (Amber O'Neal and Santana)	Tag team match; losing team must split–up	9:11
7	Ivelisse defeated Mia Yim	Singles match	13:01
8	Jessicka Havok vs. Allysin Kay ended in a double disqualification	Singles match	8:32
9	Rain (c) defeated Amazing Kong	Singles match for the Shine Championship	9:00
(c) / – the champion(s) heading into the match

== Shine 16 ==
Shine 16
- Promotion: Shine Wrestling
- Date: January 24, 2014
- City: Ybor City, Florida
- Venue: The Orpheum

No.	Results	Stipulations	Times
1	Kimberly defeated Sojo Bolt	Singles match	7:12
2	Amber O'Neal defeated La Rosa Negra	Singles match	4:09
3	Mercedes Martinez defeated Su Yung	Singles match	8:52
4	Serena defeated Santana	Singles match	9:56
5	Amazing Kong defeated Taylor Made	Singles match	9:06
6	Heidi Lovelace and Solo Darling defeated The S-N-S Express (Jessie Belle and Sassy Stephie)	Tag team match	9:17
7	Jessicka Havok vs. Allysin Kay ended in a double countout	Singles match	12:05
8	Neveah defeated Leva Bates	Singles match	11:21
9	Angelina Love defeated Leah Von Dutch	Singles match	8:30
10	Ivelisse defeated Rain (c)	Singles match for the Shine Championship	15:42
(c) / – the champion(s) heading into the match

== Shine 17 ==
Shine 17
- Promotion: Shine Wrestling
- Date: February 28, 2014
- City: Ybor City, Florida
- Venue: The Orpheum

No.	Results	Stipulations	Times
1	Made in Sin (Allysin Kay and Taylor Made) defeated Su Yung and Tracy Taylor	Shine Tag Team Championship tournament qualifying match	11:19
2	The S-N-S Express (Jessie Belle and Sassy Stephie) defeated MsEerie (Christina Von Eerie and MsChif)	Shine Tag Team Championship tournament qualifying match	14:29
3	The Buddy System (Heidi Lovelace and Solo Darling) defeated Brandi Wine and Malia Hosaka	Shine Tag Team Championship tournament qualifying match	10:44
4	The Lucha Sisters (Leva Bates and Mia Yim) defeated The Kimber Bombs (Kimber Lee and Cherry Bomb)	Shine Tag Team Championship tournament qualifying match	12:20
5	Serena defeated Angelina Love	Singles match	14:55
6	Made in Sin (Allysin Kay and Taylor Made) defeated The Buddy System (Heidi Lovelace and Solo Darling)	Shine Tag Team Championship tournament semi-final match	6:49
7	The Lucha Sisters (Leva Bates and Mia Yim) defeated The S-N-S Express (Jessie Belle and Sassy Stephie)	Shine Tag Team Championship tournament semi-final match	12:15
8	Ivelisse (c) defeated Mercedes Martinez	Singles match for the Shine Championship	19:34
9	The Lucha Sisters (Leva Bates and Mia Yim) defeated Made in Sin (Allysin Kay and Taylor Made)	Tournament final match for the inaugural Shine Tag Team Championship	11:46
(c) / – the champion(s) heading into the match

== Shine 18 ==
Shine 18
- Promotion: Shine Wrestling
- Date: April 18, 2014
- City: Ybor City, Florida
- Venue: The Orpheum

No.	Results	Stipulations	Times
1	Kellie Skater defeated Justine Silver, Kay Lee Ray and Kimberly (with Daffney)	Four-way match	8:32
2	Tracy Taylor defeated Amber O'Neal	Singles match	7:50
3	Shanna defeated La Rosa Negra	Singles match	10:39
4	Su Yung defeated Rhia O'Reilly	Singles match	11:46
5	The Lucha Sisters (Leva Bates and Mia Yim) (c) defeated Evie and Kellie Skater	Tag team match for the Shine Tag Team Championship	11:21
6	Amazing Kong (with Daffney) defeated Nikki Storm	Singles match	7:13
7	Serena Deeb (with April Hunter) defeated Mercedes Martinez	Singles match	19:34
8	Allysin Kay (with April Hunter) vs. Jessicka Havok ended in a no–contest	"Ybor City Street Fight"	11:54
9	Ivelisse (c) defeated Saraya Knight	Singles match for the Shine Championship	8:43
(c) / – the champion(s) heading into the match

== Shine 19 ==
Shine 19
- Promotion: Shine Wrestling
- Date: May 20, 2014
- City: Ybor City, Florida
- Venue: The Orpheum

No.	Results	Stipulations	Times
1	Solo Darling defeated Luscious Latasha	Singles match	5:29
2	Nevaeh defeated Justine Silver	Singles match	9:17
3	Leah Von Dutch defeated Taeler Hendrix	Singles match	7:30
4	La Rosa Negra defeated Niya Barela	Singles match	10:09
5	Awesome Kong defeated Athena	Singles match	7:30
6	Valkyrie (Allysin Kay, April Hunter, Serena Deeb, Su Yung and Taylor Made) defeated Ivelisse, Jessicka Havok, Leva Bates, Mia Yim and Tracy Taylor	10-Woman Tag Team Elimination match	42:03

== Shine 20 ==
Shine 20
- Promotion: Shine Wrestling
- Date: June 27, 2014
- City: Ybor City, Florida
- Venue: The Orpheum

No.	Results	Stipulations	Times
1	Legendary (Malia Hosaka and Brandi Wine) defeated The Buddy System (Heidi Lovelace and Solo Darling), The S-N-S Express (Sassy Stephie and Jessie Belle) and Kimber Lee	Four corner tag team match to determine the number one contenders to the Shine Tag Team Championship	11:33
2	Crazy Mary Dobson defeated Amber O'Neal by disqualification	Singles match	7:40
3	Su Yung defeated Justine Silver	Singles match	8:34
4	La Rosa Negra defeated Shanna	Singles match	12:11
5	Candice LeRae defeated Nevaeh	Singles match	10:25
6	Legendary (Malia Hosaka and Brandi Wine) defeated The Lucha Sisters (Leva Bates and Mia Yim) (c)	Tag team match for the Shine Tag Team Championship	12:30
7	Allysin Kay defeated Jessicka Havok	Last Woman Standing match	15:47
8	Ivelisse (c) vs. Serena Deeb ended in a time–limit draw	Singles match for the Shine Championship	60:00
(c) / – the champion(s) heading into the match

== Shine 21 ==
Shine 21
- Promotion: Shine Wrestling
- Date: August 22, 2014
- City: Ybor City, Florida
- Venue: The Orpheum

No.	Results	Stipulations	Times
1	Nevaeh defeated Awesome Kong, Leah Von Dutch and Su Yung	Four-way match number one contenders match	10:15
2	Solo Darling and Heidi Lovelace defeated ACR and Jayme Jameson	Tag team match	10:25
3	Thunderkitty defeated Justine Silver	Singles match	8:14
4	The Kimber Bombs (Kimber Lee and Cherry Bomb) defeated The S-N-S Express (Sassy Stephie and Jessie Belle)	Tag team match	11:31
5	Taylor Made defeated La Rosa Negra	Singles match	9:06
6	Legendary (Malia Hosaka and Brandi Wine) (c) defeated The Lucha Sisters (Leva Bates and Mia Yim)	Tag team match for the Shine Tag Team Championship	8:09
7	Ivelisse (c) defeated Nevaeh	Singles match for the Shine Championship	19:46
8	Jessicka Havok defeated Allysin Kay	Dog collar match	15:40
(c) / – the champion(s) heading into the match

== Shine 22 ==
Shine 22
- Promotion: Shine Wrestling
- Date: October 10, 2014
- City: Ybor City, Florida
- Venue: The Orpheum

No.	Results	Stipulations
1	Su Yung defeated ACR	Singles match
2	Rhia O'Reilly defeated KC Cassidy	Singles match
3	La Rosa Negra defeated Thunderkitty	Singles match
4	Valifornia (Jayme Jameson, Marti Belle and Nevaeh) defeated Kellie Skater, Leva Bates and Mia Yim	Six-man tag team match
5	Taylor Made defeated Nikki Storm	Singles match
6	Leah Von Dutch defeated Saraya Knight	Singles match
7	Legendary (Malia Hosaka and Brandi Wine) (c) defeated Solo Darling and Heidi Lovelace	Tag team match for the Shine Tag Team Championship
8	Allysin Kay defeated Evie	Singles match
9	Ivelisse (c) defeated Madison Eagles	Singles match for the Shine Championship
(c) / – the champion(s) heading into the match

== Shine 23 ==
Shine 23
- Promotion: Shine Wrestling
- Date: December 05, 2014
- City: Ybor City, Florida
- Venue: The Orpheum

No.	Results	Stipulations
1	Ivelisse defeated ACR	Singles match
2	Amber O'Neal vs. Luscious Latasha ended in a no contest	Singles match
3	Allysin Kay defeated Crazy Mary Dobson	Singles match
4	Jayme Jameson and Marti Belle defeated The Buddy System (Heidi Lovelace and Solo Darling)	Tag team match
5	Vanessa Kraven defeated Leva Bates	Singles match
6	Thunderkitty (with Leilani Kai) defeated Leah Von Dutch	Singles match
7	Taylor Made defeated La Rosa Negra	Singles match
8	Legendary (Brandi Wine and Malia Hosaka) (with Leilani Kai and Thunderkitty) (c) defeated The Kimber Bombs (Cherry Bomb and Kimber Lee)	Tag team match for the Shine Tag Team Championship
9	Santana Garrett defeated Amber Gallows	Singles match
10	Nevaeh defeated Mia Yim (c) by disqualification	Singles match for the Shine Championship
(c) / – the champion(s) heading into the match

== Shine 24 ==
Shine 24
- Promotion: Shine Wrestling
- Date: January 23, 2015
- City: Ybor City, Florida
- Venue: The Orpheum

No.	Results	Stipulations	Times
1	Amber Gallows (with Doc Gallows) defeated ACR	Singles match	—
2	Jayme Jameson and Marti Belle (with Andrea and SoCal Val) defeated Luscious Latasha and Solo Darling	Tag team match	8:24
3	Taylor Made (with April Hunter) defeated Jessica James	Singles match	8:11
4	Leva Bates defeated Su Yung (with April Hunter) by disqualification	Singles match	12:26
5	Allysin Kay (with April Hunter) defeated Athena	Singles match	13:42
6	The Kimber Bombs (Cherry Bomb and Kimber Lee) and Leah Von Dutch defeated Legendary (Brandi Wine and Malia Hosaka) and Thunderkitty (with Leilani Kai)	Six-woman tag team match	11:17
7	Mia Yim (c) defeated Santana Garrett	Singles match for the Shine Championship	13:19
(c) / – the champion(s) heading into the match

== Shine 25 ==
Shine 25
- Promotion: Shine Wrestling
- Date: March 6, 2015
- City: Ybor City, Florida
- Venue: The Orpheum

No.	Results	Stipulations	Times
1	Crazy Mary Dobson and Solo Darling (with Daffney) defeated Andrea and Jayme Jameson (with SoCal Val)	Tag team match	10:04
2	Leva Bates defeated Amber Gallows and Thunderkitty (with Leilani Kai)	Three-way match	4:34
3	La Rosa Negra defeated Taylor Made (with Su Yung) by disqualification	Singles match	8:28
4	Havok defeated Su Yung by disqualification	Singles match	2:18
5	Santana Garrett (c) defeated Shanna	Singles match for the NWA World Women's Championship	10:11
6	Allysin Kay defeated Leah Von Dutch	Singles match	8:09
7	The Kimber Bombs (Cherry Bomb and Kimber Lee) defeated Legendary (Brandi Wine and Malia Hosaka) (with Leilani Kai and Thunderkitty) (c)	Tag team match for the Shine Tag Team Championship	8:08
8	Mia Yim (c) defeated Nevaeh (with Andrea and SoCal Val) (2:1)	Two out of three falls match for the Shine Championship	19:13
(c) / – the champion(s) heading into the match

== Shine 26 ==
Shine 26
- Promotion: Shine Wrestling
- Date: April 3, 2015
- City: Ybor City, Florida
- Venue: The Orpheum

No.	Results	Stipulations	Times
1	Shazza McKenzie defeated Miss Rachel	Singles match	5:30
2	Andrea (with Marti Belle and Jayme Jameson) defeated Nikki Storm	Singles match	6:38
3	Evie defeated Tessa Blanchard	Singles match	8:01
4	Crazy Mary Dobson and Solo Darling (with Daffney) defeated Jayme Jameson and Marti Belle	Tag team match	6:18
5	Madison Eagles defeated La Rosa Negra	Singles match	10:21
6	Saraya Knight and Su Yung defeated Jessicka Havok and Leva Bates	No disqualification Tag team match	6:24
7	The Kimber Bombs (Cherry Bomb and Kimber Lee) (Shine) vs. Global Green Gangsters (Kellie Skater and Tomoka Nakagawa) (Shimmer) ended in a double count–out	Title vs. title match for the Shine Tag Team Championship and Shimmer Tag Team Championship	20:37
8	Allysin Kay defeated Kay Lee Ray	Singles match	10:08
9	Santana Garrett (NWA) defeated Mia Yim (Shine)	Title vs. title match for both NWA World Women's Championship and Shine Championship	17:41

== Shine 27 ==
Shine 27
- Promotion: Shine Wrestling
- Date: May 15, 2015
- City: Ybor City, Florida
- Venue: The Orpheum

No.	Results	Stipulations
1	Leva Bates defeated Tessa Blanchard	Singles match
2	Amber Gallows defeated Xandra Bale	Singles match
3	Leah Von Dutch defeated Thunderkitty	Singles match
4	Andrea and Jayme Jameson defeated Crazy Mary Dobson and Kimberly	Tag team match
5	Allysin Kay defeated Tracy Taylor	Singles match
6	La Rosa Negra defeated Taylor Made	Brass Knuckles on a Pole match
7	The Kimber Bombs (Cherry Bomb and Kimber Lee) (c) defeated Legendary (Brandi Wine and Malia Hosaka)	Tag team match for the Shine Tag Team Championship
8	Jessicka Havok defeated Su Yung	Anything Goes match
9	Santana Garrett (c) defeated Mia Yim	Singles match for the Shine Championship
(c) / – the champion(s) heading into the match

== Shine 28 ==
Shine 28
- Promotion: Shine Wrestling
- Date: July 24, 2015
- City: Ybor City, Florida
- Venue: The Orpheum

No.	Results	Stipulations
1	Malia Hosaka (with Leilani Kai) defeated La Rosa Negra	Singles match
2	ACR defeated Renee Michelle	Singles match
3	Tracy Taylor defeated Su Yung (with April Hunter)	Singles match
4	Leva Bates defeated Amber Gallows	Singles match
5	Vanessa Kraven defeated Jessicka Havok	Singles match
6	Allysin Kay defeated Mia Yim	Singles match
7	The Kimber Bombs (Cherry Bomb and Kimber Lee) (c) vs. Andrea and Marti Belle ended in a no contest	Tag team match for the Shine Tag Team Championship
8	Santana Garrett (c) defeated Ivelisse	Singles match for the Shine Championship
(c) / – the champion(s) heading into the match

== Shine 29 ==
Shine 29
- Promotion: Shine Wrestling
- Date: September 4, 2015
- City: Ybor City, Florida
- Venue: The Orpheum

No.	Results	Stipulations
1	Crazy Mary Dobson (with Daffney) defeated Miss Rachel	Singles match
2	Taylor Made (with April Hunter) defeated Cherry Bomb	Singles match
3	Leva Bates and Mia Yim defeated Andrea and Jayme Jameson (with SoCal Val)	Tag team match
4	Luscious Latasha defeated Su Yung	Singles match
5	Jessicka Havok defeated LuFisto	Singles match
6	Leah Von Dutch defeated Brandi Wine (with Leilani Kai)	Singles match
7	ACR and Ivelisse defeated Malia Hosaka and Thunderkitty	Tag team match
8	Vanessa Kraven defeated Athena	Singles match
9	Santana Garrett (c) defeated Allysin Kay	Singles match for the Shine Championship
(c) / – the champion(s) heading into the match

== Shine 30 ==
Shine 30
- Promotion: Shine Wrestling
- Date: October 2, 2015
- City: Ybor City, Florida
- Venue: The Orpheum

No.	Results	Stipulations	Times
1^{D}	Aria Blake defeated Aspen Rose	Singles match	4:06
2	Shazza McKenzie defeated Jayme Jameson (with Andrea and SoCal Val), Kellyanne English and Liberty	Four-way match	7:57
3	Luscious Latasha defeated Andrea (with Jayme Jameson and SoCal Val) by disqualification	Singles match	3:05
4	Ivelisse (with ACR) defeated Thunderkitty (with Leilani Kai)	Singles match	9:18
5	Kimber Lee defeated Taylor Made (with April Hunter and SoCal Val)	Singles match	9:57
6	Leah Von Dutch defeated Malia Hosaka (with Leilani Kai and Thunderkitty)	Singles match	11:20
7	The Lucha Sisters (Leva Bates and Mia Yim) defeated Rhia O'Reilly and Sammi Baynz (with Saraya Knight)	Tag team match	9:01
8	Madison Eagles defeated Su Yung (with April Hunter and SoCal Val)	Singles match	15:05
9	Jessicka Havok defeated Kay Lee Ray	Singles match	9:23
10	Santana Garrett (c) defeated Evie	Singles match for the Shine Championship	10:04
11	Allysin Kay defeated Saraya Knight (with Rhia O'Reilly and Sammi Baynz)	Falls count anywhere anything goes match	13:31
(c) / – the champion(s) heading into the match; D / – this was a dark match

== Shine 31 ==
Shine 31
- Promotion: Shine Wrestling
- Date: December 11, 2015
- City: Ybor City, Florida
- Venue: The Orpheum

No.	Results	Stipulations
1^{D}	Kennadi Brink defeated Devyn Nicole	Singles match
2	Taylor Made defeated Allysin Kay, Jessicka Havok and Amber Gallows	Four-way match for the Shine Championship #1 Contender status
3	The Lucha Sisters (Mia Yim and Leva Bates) defeated Legendary (Malia Hosaka and Brandi Wine)	Tag team match tournament match for the vacant Shine Tag Team Championship
4	BTY (Marti Belle and Jayme Jameson) defeated Heidi Lovelace and Solo Darling	Tag team match tournament match for the vacant Shine Tag Team Championship
5	Luscious Latasha defeated Thunderkitty	Singles match
6	Andrea (with April Hunter and SoCal Val) defeated ACR	Singles match
7	Su Yung defeated Jessica James	Singles match
8	Leah Von Dutch defeated Leilani Kai	Singles match
9	BTY (Jayme Jameson and Marti Belle) (with April Hunter and SoCal Val) defeated The Lucha Sisters (Leva Bates and Mia Yim)	Tag team match for the Shine Tag Team Championship
10	Taylor Made (with April Hunter and SoCal Val) defeated Santana Garrett (c)	Singles match for the Shine Championship
(c) / – the champion(s) heading into the match; D / – this was a dark match

== Shine 32 ==
Shine 32
- Promotion: Shine Wrestling
- Date: January 29, 2016
- City: Ybor City, Florida
- Venue: The Orpheum

No.	Results	Stipulations	Times
1	Jessicka Havok defeated Andrea (with SoCal Val)	Singles match	10:19
2	Crazy Mary Dobson defeated Amy Love	Singles match	6:23
3	ACR (with La Rosa Negra) vs. Brandi Wine (with Leilani Kai and Malia Hosaka) ended in a no contest	Singles match	—
4	Legendary (Brandi Wine and Malia Hosaka) (with Leilani Kai) defeated ACR and Thunderkitty (with La Rosa Negra)	Impromptu Tag Team match	17:17
5	Barbi Hayden defeated Renee Michelle	Singles match	8:15
6	Kimber Lee defeated Jayme Jameson (with Andrea and SoCal Val)	Singles match	—
7	Amber Gallows (c) defeated Leva Bates	Singles match for the NWA World Women's Championship	13:16
8	Luscious Latasha defeated Vanessa Kraven by disqualification	Singles match	7:19
9	Su Yung (with Andrea and SoCal Val) defeated Allysin Kay	Singles match	12:22
10	Taylor Made (c) (with Andrea and SoCal Val) defeated Santana Garrett	Singles match for the Shine Championship	—
(c) / – the champion(s) heading into the match

== Shine 33 ==
Shine 33
- Promotion: Shine Wrestling
- Date: February 26, 2016
- City: Ybor City, Florida
- Venue: The Orpheum

No.	Results	Stipulations
1^{D}	Maria Maria defeated Kennadi Brink	Singles match
2	Barbi Hayden defeated Leah Vaughan	Singles match
3	Andrea (with April Hunter) defeated Tracy Taylor	Singles match
4	Luscious Latasha defeated Mia Yim by count out	Singles match
5	Amber Gallows (c) defeated Thunderkitty	Singles match for the NWA World Women's Championship
6	Crazy Mary Dobson defeated Su Yung (with April Hunter)	Singles match
7	BTY (Jayme Jameson and Marti Belle) (with April Hunter) (c) defeated Las Sicarias Emerges (ACR and Ivelisse Velez) (with La Rosa Negra)	Tag team match for the Shine Tag Team Championship
8	Jessicka Havok vs. Vanessa Kraven ended in a no contest	Singles match
9	Taylor Made (c) (with April Hunter) defeated Kimber Lee	Singles match for the Shine Championship
(c) / – the champion(s) heading into the match; D / – this was a dark match

== Shine 34 ==
Shine 34
- Promotion: Shine Wrestling
- Date: April 15, 2016
- City: Ybor City, Florida
- Venue: The Orpheum

No.	Results	Stipulations
1^{D}	Maria Maria defeated Stormie Lee	Singles match
2	ACR (with La Rosa Negra) defeated Kennadi Brink and Amy Love	Three-way match
3	Tessa Blanchard (with Andrea) defeated Rachael Ellering	Singles match
4	Luscious Latasha, Kimber Lee, and Santana Garrett defeated Andrea, Marti Belle, and Jayme Jameson	Six-woman tag team match
5	Malia Hosaka (with Leilani Kai) defeated Thunderkitty	Singles match
6	Taylor Made (c) (with Andrea) defeated Jessicka Havok by disqualification	Singles match for the Shine Championship
7	Allysin Kay defeated Su Yung (with April Hunter)	Singapore Cane match
(c) / – the champion(s) heading into the match; D / – this was a dark match

== Shine 35 ==
Shine 35
- Promotion: Shine Wrestling
- Date: June 17, 2016
- City: Ybor City, Florida
- Venue: The Orpheum

No.	Results	Stipulations	Times
1	Ivelisse defeated Kellie Skater, Mia Yim, Nicole Matthews and Santana	Money in the Bank match	12:55
2	Luscious Latasha and Maria Maria defeated Rhia O'Reilly and Viper	Tag team match	10:17
3	Kellyanne defeated Chelsea Green	Singles match	10:30
4	BTY (Jayme Jameson and Marti Belle) (c) defeated Evie and Shazza McKenzie	Tag Team match for the Shine Tag Team Championship	12:52
5	Rachael Ellering defeated Tessa Blanchard	Singles match	9:08
6	Su Yung defeated Kay Lee Ray	Singles match	12:34
7	Ivelisse defeated Taylor Made (Shine (c), Allysin Kay (TNA (c), and Madison Eagles (Shimmer (c) to win the Shine Championship	Four-way match - loser of the fall loses title	12:32
(c) / – the champion(s) heading into the match

== Shine 36 ==
Shine 36
- Promotion: Shine Wrestling
- Date: July 22, 2016
- City: Ybor City, Florida
- Venue: The Orpheum

No.	Results	Stipulations	Times
1	Devin Nicole defeated Ariel Monroe	Singles match	4:06
2	Thunderkitty defeated Miss Rachel	Singles match	9:26
3	Luscious Latasha defeated Kennadi Brink, Stormie Lee and Candy Cartwright	Four-way match	4:58
4	Raquel defeated Kelly Klein	Singles match	5:51
5	Amber Gallows (c) defeated Tracy Taylor	Singles match for the NWA World Women's Championship	9:33
6	Vanessa Kraven defeated Santana Garrett	Singles match	6:56
7	BTY (Jayme Jameson and Marti Belle) (c) defeated ACR and La Rosa Negra	Tag team match for the Shine Tag Team Championship	11:21
8	Allysin Kay defeated Xandra Bale	Singles match	10:13
9	Ivelisse (c) defeated Su Yung	Singles match for the Shine Championship	11:21
(c) / – the champion(s) heading into the match

== Shine 37 ==
Shine 37
- Promotion: Shine Wrestling
- Date: September 2, 2016
- City: Ybor City, Florida
- Venue: The Orpheum

No.	Results	Stipulations
1	Priscilla Kelly defeated Dominique Fabiano	Singles match
2	Luscious Latasha defeated Layne Rosario	Singles match
3	Rachael Ellering defeated Randi West	Singles match
4	Amber Gallows (c) defeated Leva Bates, Tracy Taylor and Kennadi Brink	Four-way match for the NWA World Women's Championship
5	Thea Trinidad defeated Stormie Lee	Singles match
6	Raquel defeated Santana Garrett	Singles match
7	Vanessa Kraven defeated Su Yung	Singles match
8	Marti Belle and Jayme Jameson (c) defeated Dominique Fabiano and Priscilla Kelly	Tag team match for the Shine Tag Team Championship
9	Mercedes Martinez vs. Andrea ended in a no contest	Singles match
10	Thunderkitty defeated Malia Hosaka	"I Quit" Match
11	Ivelisse (c) defeated LuFisto	Singles match for the Shine Championship
(c) / – the champion(s) heading into the match

== Shine 38 ==
Shine 38
- Promotion: Shine Wrestling
- Date: November 4, 2016
- City: Ybor City, Florida
- Venue: The Orpheum

No.	Results	Stipulations	Times
1	Mercedes Martinez defeated Andréa	Anything Goes match	10:44
2	Chelsea Diamond defeated Priscilla Kelly	Singles match	6:48
3	Tracy Taylor defeated Miss Rachel	Singles match	7:47
4	Aria Blake (c) vs. Brandi Lauren ended in a no contest	Singles match for the ACW Women's Championship	7:01
5	Rhia O'Reilly defeated Rachael Ellering	Singles match	8:42
6	Leva Bates defeated Jessie Belle Smothers	Singles match	8:41
7	Raquel defeated Tessa Blanchard	Singles match	10:05
8	ACR and Shayna Baszler defeated C4 (Amber Gallows and Kennadi Brink)	Tag team match	7:58
9	Su Yung defeated Saraya Knight by count out	Singles match	10:32
10	LuFisto defeated Allysin Kay	Number one contender for the Shine Championship	16:04
11	Ivelisse (c) defeated Vanessa Kraven by submission	Singles match for the Shine Championship	11:28
(c) / – the champion(s) heading into the match

== Shine 39 ==
Shine 39
- Promotion: Shine Wrestling
- Date: December 16, 2016
- City: Ybor City, Florida
- Venue: The Orpheum

No.	Results	Stipulations
1	Kiera Hogan defeated Lindsay Snow	Singles match
2	Jessie Belle Smothers defeated Brandi Lauren	Singles match
3	Leva Bates defeated Stormie Lee	Singles match
4	Malia Hosaka defeated Priscilla Kelly	Singles match
5	Raquel and Santana Garrett defeated BTY (Jayme Jameson and Marti Belle) (c)	Tag team match for the Shine Tag Team Championship
6	Allysin Kay defeated Tessa Blanchard	Singles match
7	Su Yung defeated Vanessa Kraven	Falls Count Anywhere match
8	Las Sicarias (ACR, Ivelisse (c), Mercedes Martinez and Thea Trinidad) defeated C4 (Amber O'Neal, Andréa, Kennadi Brink and LuFisto)	Eight-woman tag team match for the Shine Championship
(c) / – the champion(s) heading into the match

== Shine 40 ==
Shine 40
- Promotion: Shine Wrestling
- Date: January 13, 2017
- City: Ybor City, Florida
- Venue: The Orpheum

No.	Results	Stipulations
1	Su Yung defeated Angel Rose, Jayme Jameson and Jessie Belle Smothers	Four-way match
2	Malia Hosaka defeated Brandi Lauren	Singles match
3	Xandra Bale defeated Aerial Monroe	Singles match
4	Candy Cartwright defeated Leva Bates	Singles match
5	Rachael Ellering defeated Chelsea Green	Singles match
6	Santana Garrett and Raquel (c) defeated Las Sicarias (Thea Trinidad and ACR and C4 (Amber O'Neal and Kennadi Brink)	Three-way match for the Shine Tag Team Championship
7	LuFisto defeated Allysin Kay and Mercedes Martinez	Three-way match for the vacated Shine Championship
(c) / – the champion(s) heading into the match

== Shine 41 ==
Shine 41
- Promotion: Shine Wrestling
- Date: March 10, 2017
- City: Ybor City, Florida
- Venue: The Orpheum

No.	Results	Stipulations
1	Aria Blake defeated Lindsay Snow	Singles match
2	Aerial Monroe defeated Priscilla Kelly	Singles match
3	Malia Hosaka defeated Angel Rose	Singles match
4	Thea Trinidad defeated Brandi Lauren	Singles match
5	ACR defeated Dynamite Didi, Jayme Jameson and Leva Bates	Four-way match
6	Su Yung defeated Candy Cartwright	Singles match
7	Raquel and Santana (c) defeated Kennadi Brink and Vanessa Kraven	Tag team match for the Shine Tag Team Championship
8	Allysin Kay vs. Mercedes Martinez ended in a draw	Singles match
9	LuFisto (c) defeated Ivelisse	Singles match for the Shine Championship
(c) / – the champion(s) heading into the match

== Shine 42 ==
Shine 42
- Promotion: Shine Wrestling
- Date: May 12, 2017
- City: Ybor City, Florida
- Venue: The Orpheum

No.	Results	Stipulations
1^{D}	Dementia D'Rose defeated Aja Perera	Singles match
2	Maria Maria defeated Dynamite DiDi	Singles match
3	Kiera Hogan defeated Priscilla Kelly	Singles match
4	ACR defeated Lindsay Snow	Singles match
5	Aerial Monroe defeated Aria Blake (with Candy Cartwright and Kiera Hogan)	Singles match
6	Las Sicarias (Ivelisse and Mercedes Martinez) defeated Raquel and Santana Garrett (c)	Tag team match for the Shine Tag Team Championship
7	Allysin Kay defeated Chelsea Green	Singles match
8	Renee Michelle defeated Candy Cartwright (with Aria Blake and Kiera Hogan) by disqualification	Singles match
9	Aerial Monroe, Priscilla Kelly and Renee Michelle defeated Aria Blake, Candy Cartwright and Kiera Hogan	Six-man tag team match
10	LuFisto (c) defeated Leva Bates	Singles match for the Shine Championship
(c) / – the champion(s) heading into the match; D / – this was a dark match

== Shine 43 ==
Shine 43
- Promotion: Shine Wrestling
- Date: July 14, 2017
- City: Ybor City, Florida
- Venue: The Orpheum

No.	Results	Stipulations
1^{D}	Kikyo defeated Lea Nox	Singles match
2	Priscilla Kelly defeated Veda Scott	Shine Nova Championship: 1st Round Match
3	Leah Vaughan defeated ACR	Shine Nova Championship: 1st Round Match
4	Aja Perera defeated Stormie Lee	Shine Nova Championship: 1st Round Match
5	Kiera Hogan defeated Shotzi Blackheart	Shine Nova Championship: 1st Round Match
6	Maria Maria (aka Allysin Kay) defeated Dementia D'Rose, Brandi Lauren, Daisy and Natalia Markova	Once in a Lifetime Contender's 5 way Match
7	Aria Blake defeated Dynamite Didi	Shine Nova Championship: 1st Round Match
8	Jordynne Grace defeated La Rosa Negra	Shine Nova Championship: 1st Round Match
9	Candy Cartwright defeated Robyn Reid	Shine Nova Championship: 1st Round Match
10	Ivelisse vs. Holidead ended in a draw	Shine Nova Championship: 1st Round Match
D / – this was a dark match

== Shine 44 ==
Shine 44
- Promotion: Shine Wrestling
- Date: July 16, 2017
- City: Ybor City, Florida
- Venue: The Orpheum

No.	Results	Stipulations
1	Priscilla Kelly defeated Leah Vaughan	Shine Nova Championship Quarterfinal match
2	Kiera Hogan defeated Aja Perera	Shine Nova Championship Quarterfinal match
3	Jordynne Grace defeated Aria Blake	Shine Nova Championship, Quarterfinal match
4	Shotzi Blackheart defeated Dementia D'Rose and Natalia Markova	Three-way match
5	Priscilla Kelly defeated Kiera Hogan	Shine Nova Championship Semi-final match
6	Candy Cartwright defeated Jordynne Grace	Shine Nova Championship Semi-final match
7	LuFisto (c) defeated Allysin Kay by disqualification	Shine Championship
8	Priscilla Kelly defeated Candy Cartwright	Shine Nova Championship Final match
(c) / – the champion(s) heading into the match

== Shine 45 ==
Shine 45
- Promotion: Shine Wrestling
- Date: September 15, 2017
- City: Ybor City, Florida
- Venue: The Orpheum

No.	Results	Stipulations
1	Kamilla Kaine defeated Miss Hannah	Singles match
2	ACR defeated La Rosa Negra	Anything Goes match
3	MJ Jenkins defeated Natalia Markova	Singles match
4	Stormie Lee defeated Lady Chardonnay Darcy	Singles match
5	Vanessa Kraven defeated Dementia D'Rose	Singles match
6	The Cutie Pie Club (Aria Blake, Candy Cartwright and Kiera Hogan) defeated Aja Perera, Dominique Fabiano and Lea Nox	Six-woman tag team match
7	Allysin Kay defeated Brandi Lauren	Singles match
8	Priscilla Kelly (c) defeated Jordynne Grace	Singles match for the Shine Nova Championship
9	LuFisto (c) defeated Holidead and Ivelisse	Three-way match for the Shine Championship
(c) / – the champion(s) heading into the match

== Shine 46 ==
Shine 46
- Promotion: Shine Wrestling
- Date: October 20, 2017
- City: Ybor City, Florida
- Venue: The Orpheum

No.	Results	Stipulations
1	Allysin Kay defeated Dementia D'Rose	Singles match
2	ACR defeated Natalia Markova	Singles match
3	Aerial Monroe and Aja Perera defeated The Cutie Pie Club (Kiera Hogan and Aria Blake)	Tag team match
4	Priscilla Kelly (c) defeated Santana	Singles match for the Shine Nova Championship
5	Jordynne Grace defeated Candy Cartwright	Singles match
6	LuFisto (c) defeated Vanessa Kraven	Singles match for the Shine Championship
7	Las Sicarias (Ivelisse and Mercedes Martinez) (c) defeated Twisted Sisterz (Holidead and Thunder Rosa)	Tag team match for the Shine Tag Team Championship
(c) / – the champion(s) heading into the match

== Shine 47 "Survival" ==
Shine 47
- Promotion: Shine Wrestling
- Date: December 16, 2017
- City: Ybor City, Florida
- Venue: The Orpheum

No.	Results	Stipulations
1	Rain won (Note: Also involving: Aerial Monroe, Aja Perera, Aria Blake, Brandi Lauren, Candy Cartwright, Dementia D'Rose, Dynamite DiDi, Ivelisse, Jessicka Havok, Kiera Hogan, Kikyo, Leva Bates, Mercedes Martinez, Natalia Markova, Priscilla Kelly, Robyn Reid, Shotzi Blackheart, Stormie Lee and Tesha Price)	Survival Rumble match
2	Natalia Markova defeated Aerial Monroe	Singles match
3	Dynamite Didi defeated Kikyo, Robyn Reid and Tesha Price	Four-way match
4	Leva defeated Dementia D'Rose via disqualification	Singles match
5	Priscilla Kelly (c) defeated Aja Perera	Singles match for the Shine Nova Championship
6	Shotzi Blackheart defeated Kiera Hogan	Singles match
7	Jessicka Havok defeated Brandi Lauren	Singles match
8	Las Sicarias (Ivelisse and Mercedes Martinez) (c) defeated The Cutie Pie Club (Aria Blake and Candy Cartwright)	Tag team match for the Shine Tag Team Championship
9	Stormie Lee defeated Rain by referee stoppage	Singles match
(c) / – the champion(s) heading into the match

== Shine 48 ==
Shine 48
- Promotion: Shine Wrestling
- Date: January 26, 2018
- City: Ybor City, Florida
- Venue: The Orpheum

No.	Results	Stipulations
1	Amber Nova defeated Chelsea Durben	Singles match
2	Stormie Lee defeated Tesha Price	Singles match
3	Holidead defeated Dynamite DiDi	Singles match
4	Brandi Lauren defeated Leva	Singles match
5	Candy Cartwright, Dementia D'Rose and Kiera Hogan defeated Aerial Monroe, Priscilla Kelly and Vanessa Kraven	Six-woman tag team match
6	Jordynne Grace defeated Natalia Markova	Singles match
7	Santana defeated Renee Michelle	Singles match
8	Las Sicarias (Ivelisse and Mercedes Martinez) (c) defeated Chardonnay and Isla Dawn	Tag team match for the Shine Tag Team Championship
9	LuFisto (c) defeated Rain	Singles match for the Shine Championship
(c) / – the champion(s) heading into the match

== Shine 49 ==
Shine 49
- Promotion: Shine Wrestling
- Date: March 10, 2018
- City: Queens, New York
- Venue: LA Boom

No.	Results	Stipulations
1	Vanessa Kraven defeated Dementia D'Rose	Singles match
2	Stormie Lee defeated Allie Recks	Singles match
3	Ruthless Ambition (Maria Manic and Penelope Ford) defeated Rainbow Bright (Gabby Gilbert and Luscious Latasha)	Tag team match
4	Aerial Monroe defeated Kiera Hogan	Singles match
5	Candy Cartwright (with Dementia D'Rose and Kiera Hogan) defeated Priscilla Kelly (c)	Singles match for the Shine Nova Championship
6	Brandi Lauren defeated Shotzi Blackheart	Singles match
7	LuFisto (c) defeated Mercedes Martinez	Singles match for the Shine Championship
(c) / – the champion(s) heading into the match

== Shine 50 ==
Shine 50
- Promotion: Shine Wrestling
- Date: April 27, 2018
- City: Ybor City, Florida
- Venue: The Orpheum

No.	Results	Stipulations
1	Kaci Lennox defeated Chelsea Durden	Singles match
2	Leva Bates defeated Dynamite DiDi, Luscious Latasha and Tesha Price	Four-way match
3	Amber Nova defeated Jayme Jameson	Singles match
4	Jessie Belle Smothers (with Tracy Smothers) defeated Renee Michelle	Singles match
5	Dementia D'Rose defeated Jordynne Grace	Singles match
6	Santana Garrett defeated Kiera Hogan	Singles match
7	Brandi Lauren defeated Aerial Monroe by submission	Singles match
8	Candy Cartwright (c) defeated Priscilla Kelly by disqualification	Singles match for the Shine Nova Championship
9	Las Sicarias (Ivelisse and Mercedes Martinez) (c) defeated Ruthless Ambition (Maria Manic and Penelope Ford)	Tag team match for the Shine Tag Team Championship
10	Stormie Lee defeated Rain (with Tesha Price)	Street Fight
11	Kimber Lee defeated LuFisto (c) by disqualification	Singles match for the Shine Championship
(c) / – the champion(s) heading into the match

== Shine 51 ==
Shine 51
- Promotion: Shine Wrestling
- Date: June 6, 2018
- City: New York City, New York
- Venue: La Boom

No.	Results	Stipulations	Times
1	Rain defeated Allie Recks	Singles match	—
2	Natalia Markova defeated Aja Perera and Willow Nightingale	Three-way match	—
3	The Cutie Pie Club (Dementia D'Rose and Kiera Hogan) defeated Rainbow Bright (Gabby Gilbert and Luscious Latasha)	Tag team match	—
4	Priscilla Kelly defeated Holidead	Singles match	—
5	Leva Bates defeated Stormie Lee	Singles match	—
6	Candy Cartwright (c) defeated Santana Garrett by disqualification	Singles match for the Shine Nova Championship	—
7	LuFisto (c) defeated Su Yung	Singles match for the Shine Championship	—
8	Las Sicarias (Ivelisse and Mercedes Martinez) (c) vs. Ruthless Ambition (Maria Manic and Penelope Ford) ended in a time-limit draw	Tag team match for the Shine Tag Team Championship	30:00
(c) / – the champion(s) heading into the match

== Shine 52 ==
Shine 52
- Promotion: Shine Wrestling
- Date: July 20, 2018
- City: Ybor City, Florida
- Venue: The Orpheum

No.	Results	Stipulations
1	Dynamite DiDi defeated Alex Garcia	Singles match
2	Tesha Price defeated Jenna Van Muscles	Singles match
3	Brandi Lauren defeated Amber Nova by submission	Singles match
4	Candy Cartwright (c) (with Kiera Hogan and Dementia D'Rose) defeated Leva Bates	Singles match for the Shine Nova Championship
5	Su Yung defeated Kimber Lee	Singles match
6	Jordynne Grace defeated Xandra Bale by submission	Singles match
7	The Twisted Sisterz (Holidead and Thunder Rosa) defeated Las Sicarias (Ivelisse and Mercedes Martinez) (c), #TeamSPAM (Aja Perera and Aerial Monroe) and The Cutie Pie Club (Dementia D'Rose and Kiera Hogan)	Four-way tag team elimination match for the Shine Tag Team Championship
8	Rain defeated Stormie Lee	"I Quit" match
(c) / – the champion(s) heading into the match

== Shine 53 ==
Shine 53
- Promotion: Shine Wrestling
- Date: September 8, 2018
- City: Queens, New York City
- Venue: La Boom

No.	Results	Stipulations
1	Ivelisse defeated Candy Cartwright	First round tournament match for the vacant Shine Championship
2	Allysin Kay defeated Brandi Lauren	First round tournament match for the vacant Shine Championship
3	Mercedes Martinez defeated Stormie Lee by submission	First round tournament match for the vacant Shine Championship
4	Santana Garrett defeated Priscilla Kelly	First round tournament match for the vacant Shine Championship
5	Mercedes Martinez defeated Ivelisse	Semi-final tournament match for the vacant Shine Championship
6	Allysin Kay defeated Santana Garrett by submission	Semi-final tournament match for the vacant Shine Championship
7	The Twisted Sisterz (Holidead and Thunder Rosa) (c) defeated The Cutie Pie Club (Dementia D'Rose and Kiera Hogan)	Tag team match for the Shine Tag Team Championship
8	Allysin Kay defeated Mercedes Martinez by submission	Tournament final for the vacant Shine Championship
(c) / – the champion(s) heading into the match

== Shine 54 ==
Shine 54
- Promotion: Shine Wrestling
- Date: November 2, 2018
- City: Ybor City, Florida
- Venue: The Orpheum

No.	Results	Stipulations
1	Avery Taylor defeated Red Velvett	Singles match
2	Dynamite DiDi defeated Jordynne Grace, Rocky Radley and Violet Payne	Four-way match
3	Kiera Hogan (with Dementia D'Rose) defeated Amber Nova	Singles match
4	Dementia D'Rose (with Kiera Hogan) defeated Aerial Monroe	Singles match
5	Brandi Lauren and Jenna defeated Rainbow Bright (Gabby Gilbert and Luscious Latasha)	Tag team match
6	Su Yung defeated Stormie Lee	Singles match
7	Santana defeated Priscilla Kelly	Ybor City street fight
8	Aja Perera (With Ariel Monroe and Ayla Fox) defeated Candy Cartwright (c) (with Dementia D'Rose and Kiera Hogan)	Singles match for the Shine Nova Championship
9	The Twisted Sisters (Holidead and Thunder Rosa) (c) defeated Las Sicarias (Ivelisse and Mercedes Martinez)	Tag team match for the Shine Tag Team Championship
10	Allysin Kay (c) defeated LuFisto	Singles match for the Shine Championship
(c) / – the champion(s) heading into the match

== Shine 55 ==
Shine 55
- Promotion: Shine Wrestling
- Date: December 15, 2018
- City: New York City, New York
- Venue: La Boom

No.	Results	Stipulations
1	Shotzi Blackheart defeated Christina Marie	Singles match
2	Allie Recks and Willow Nightingale defeated Brandi Lauren and Jenna	Tag team match
3	Priscilla Kelly defeated Rainbow Bright (Gabby Gilbert and Luscious Latasha)	Handicap match
4	Kiera Hogan (with Candy Cartwright) defeated Aerial Monroe (with Ayla Fox)	Singles match
5	Aja Perera (with Aerial Monroe and Ayla Fox) (c) defeated Dementia D'Rose (with Candy Cartwright and Kiera Hogan)	Singles match for the Shine Nova Championship
6	Mercedes Martinez defeated Kimber Lee	Singles match
7	Allysin Kay (c) defeated Su Yung	Singles match for the Shine Championship
(c) / – the champion(s) heading into the match

== Shine 56 ==
Shine 56
- Promotion: Shine Wrestling
- Date: January 19, 2019
- City: New York City, New York
- Venue: La Boom

No.	Results	Stipulations
1	Dementia D'Rose (with Candy Cartwright) defeated Trish Adora	Singles match
2	Allie Recks defeated Brandi Lauren	Singles match
3	Priscilla Kelly defeated Santana Garrett	Street fight
4	Rainbow Bright (Gabby Gilbert and Luscious Latasha) (with Santana Garrett) defeated The Twisted Sisters (Holidead and Thunder Rosa) (c)	Tag team match for the Shine Tag Team Championship
5	Aja Perera (with Ayla Fox) (c) defeated Kiera Hogan by submission	Singles match for the Shine Nova Championship
6	Jordynne Grace vs. LuFisto ended in a no contest	No Holds Barred match
7	Allysin Kay (c) defeated Ivelisse	Singles match for the Shine Championship
(c) / – the champion(s) heading into the match

== Shine 57 ==
Shine 57
- Promotion: Shine Wrestling
- Date: March 16, 2019
- City: New York City, New York
- Venue: La Boom

No.	Results	Stipulations
1	The Twisted Sisters (Holidead and Thunder Rosa) defeated Rainbow Bright (Gabby Gilbert and Luscious Latasha) (c) by countout	Tag team match for the Shine Tag Team Championship
2	Shotzi Blackheart defeated Stormie Lee	Singles match
3	Brandi Lauren defeated Allie Recks and Riley Shepard	Three-way match
4	#TeamSPAM (Aerial Monroe and Aja Perera (c)) (with Ayla Fox) defeated The Cutie Pie Club (Dementia D'Rose and Kiera Hogan) (with Candy Cartwright)	Tag team match for the Shine Nova Championship
5	Ivelisse defeated Mercedes Martinez, Priscilla Kelly and Su Yung	Four-way elimination match
(c) / – the champion(s) heading into the match

== Shine 58 ==
Shine 58
- Promotion: Shine Wrestling
- Date: May 10, 2019
- City: Livonia, Michigan
- Venue: Knights Of Columbus Hall

No.	Results	Stipulations
1	Allysin Kay defeated Samantha Heights	Singles match
2	Brandi Lauren defeated Thunderkitty	Singles match
3	Lindsay Snow defeated Marti Belle	Singles match
4	Santana (with Gabby Gilbert and Luscious Latasha) defeated Kimber Lee	Singles match
5	Shotzi Blackheart defeated Aja Perera (with Ayla Fox) (c)	Singles match for the Shine Nova Championship
6	Ivelisse defeated Natalia Markova	Singles match
7	Mercedes Martinez defeated Su Yung	Singles match
8	Rainbow Bright (Gabby Gilbert and Luscious Latasha) (c) defeated The Twisted Sisters (Holidead and Thunder Rosa)	Tag team lumberjill match for the Shine Tag Team Championship
(c) / – the champion(s) heading into the match

== Shine 59 ==
Shine 59
- Promotion: Shine Wrestling
- Date: June 29, 2019
- City: New York City, New York
- Venue: La Boom

No.	Results	Stipulations
1	Team Sea Stars (Ashley Vox and Delmi Exo) defeated Dementia D'Rose and Gabby Gilbert	Tag team match
2	Allie Recks defeated Notorious Nadi	Singles match
3	Marti Belle defeated Madi Maxx	Singles match
4	Natalia Markova defeated Avery Taylor (c)	Singles match for the ACW Women's Championship
5	Brandi Lauren defeated La Rosa Negra	Singles match
6	Shotzi Blackheart (c) defeated Aja Perera and Santana Garrett	Three-way match for the Shine Nova Championship
7	Mercedes Martinez defeated Allysin Kay (c) by disqualification	Singles match for the Shine Championship
(c) / – the champion(s) heading into the match

== Shine 60 - 7th Anniversary Show ==
Shine 60 - 7th Anniversary Show
- Promotion: Shine Wrestling
- Date: August 24, 2019
- City: Livonia, Michigan
- Venue: Monaghan Knights Of Columbus Hall

No.	Results	Stipulations
1	Brandi Lauren (with Natalia Markova) defeated Avery Taylor	Singles match
2	Lindsay Snow defeated Leah Vaughan	Singles match
3	Triple Aye (Aerial Monroe and Aja Perera) (with Ayla Fox) defeated BTY (Jayme Jameson and Marti Belle)	Tag team match
4	Dementia D'Rose vs. Holidead ended in a double disqualification	Singles match
5	Shotzi Blackheart (c) defeated Natalia Markova (with Brandi Lauren)	Singles match for the Shine Nova Championship
6	Team Sea Stars (Ashley Vox and Delmi Exo) defeated Rainbow Bright (Gabby Gilbert and Luscious Latasha) (c) by disqualification	Tag team match for the Shine Tag Team Championship
7	Allysin Kay (c) defeated Ivelisse and Mercedes Martinez	Three-way match for the Shine Championship
(c) / – the champion(s) heading into the match

== Shine 61 ==
Shine 61
- Promotion: Shine Wrestling
- Date: September 21, 2019
- City: New York City, New York
- Venue: La Boom

No.	Results	Stipulations
1	Nadi defeated Tina San Antonio	Singles match
2	Avery Taylor and Brittany Blake defeated The Cutie Pie Club (Candy Cartwright and Double D Rose)	Tag team match
3	Alex Gracia defeated Brandi Lauren	Singles match
4	BTY (Jayme Jameson and Marti Belle) defeated Jenna and Lindsay Snow	Tag team match
5	Kris Statlander defeated Natalia Markova	Singles match
6	Triple Aye (Aja Perera and Big Swole) (with Ayla) defeated Rainbow Bright (Gabby Gilbert and Luscious Latasha) (c)	Tag team match for the Shine Tag Team Championship
7	Mercedes Martinez defeated Ivelisse	Singles match
8	Allysin Kay (c) defeated Shotzi Blackheart	Singles match for the Shine Championship
(c) / – the champion(s) heading into the match

== Shine 62 ==
Shine 62
- Promotion: Shine Wrestling
- Date: November 9, 2019
- City: New York City, New York
- Venue: La Boom

No.	Results	Stipulations
1	Madi Maxx defeated Savannah Evans	Singles match
2	Tina San Antonio defeated Vanity	Singles match
3	Candy Cartwright defeated Nadi	Singles match
4	Team Sea Stars (Ashley Vox and Delmi Exo) defeated Avery Taylor and Brittany Blake and Rainbow Bright (Gabby Gilbert and Luscious Latasha)	Three-way tag team match
5	Natalia Markova defeated Double D Rose	Singles match
6	Alex Gracia defeated Brandi Lauren by disqualification	Singles match
7	Triple Aye (Aja Perera and Big Swole) (Tag Team) and Shotzi Blackheart (Nova) (with Ayla) defeated Allysin Kay (Shine) and Better Than You (Jayme Jameson and Marti Belle)	Six-woman tag team match - loser of the fall loses title

== Shine 63 ==
Shine 63
- Promotion: Shine Wrestling
- Date: December 13, 2019
- City: Livonia, Michigan
- Venue: Monaghan Knights of Columbus Hall

No.	Results	Stipulations
1	Avery Taylor defeated Marti Belle	Shine Nova Championship tournament first round match
2	Stormie Lee defeated Thunderkitty	Shine Nova Championship tournament first round match
3	Nadi defeated La Rosa Negra	Shine Nova Championship tournament first round match
4	Lindsay Snow defeated Jayme Jameson	Shine Nova Championship tournament first round match
5	Natalia Markova defeated Jenna	Shine Nova Championship tournament first round match
6	Brandi Lauren defeated Randi West	Shine Nova Championship tournament first round match
7	Double D Rose defeated Candy Cartwright	Shine Nova Championship tournament first round match
8	Aja Perera defeated Kimber Lee by countout	Shine Nova Championship tournament first round match
9	Mercedes Martinez defeated Allysin Kay (c)	Title vs. Career match for the Shine Championship
(c) / – the champion(s) heading into the match

== Shine 64 ==
Shine 64
- Promotion: Shine Wrestling
- Date: December 15, 2019
- City: Chicago, Illinois
- Venue: Logan Square Auditorium

No.	Results	Stipulations
1	Avery Taylor defeated Nadi	Shine Nova Championship tournament quarter-final match
2	Lindsay Snow defeated Stormie Lee	Shine Nova Championship tournament quarter-final match
3	Natalia Markova defeated Double D Rose	Shine Nova Championship tournament quarter-final match
4	Brandi Lauren defeated Aja Perera	Shine Nova Championship tournament quarter-final match
5	Natalia Markova defeated Avery Taylor	Shine Nova Championship tournament semi-final match
6	Lindsay Snow defeated Brandi Lauren	Shine Nova Championship tournament semi-final match
7	Jenna defeated Candy Cartwright, Jay Raves, La Rosa Negra, Rahne Victoria and Vipress	Six-way match
8	Natalia Markova defeated Lindsay Snow	Tournament final for the vacant Shine Nova Championship
9	Ivelisse defeated Mercedes Martinez (c)	Singles match for the Shine Championship
(c) / – the champion(s) heading into the match

== Shine 65 ==
Shine 65
- Promotion: Shine Wrestling
- Date: February 29, 2020
- City: New York City, New York
- Venue: La Boom

No.	Results	Stipulations
1	La Rosa Negra defeated Jay Raves	Singles match
2	Candy Cartwright defeated Vipress	Singles match
3	Double D Rose vs. Jenna ended in no-contest	Singles match
4	Alex Gracia defeated Stormie Lee	Singles match
5	Natalia Markova (c) defeated Brandi Lauren by disqualification	Singles match for the Shine Nova Championship
6	BTY (Jayme Jameson and Marti Belle) (c) defeated Avery Taylor and Brittany Blake	Tag team match for the Shine Tag Team Championship
7	Ivelisse (c) defeated Lindsay Snow	Singles match for the Shine Championship
(c) / – the champion(s) heading into the match

== Shine 66 ==
Shine 66
- Promotion: Shine Wrestling
- Date: January 23, 2021
- City: Port Richey, Florida
- Venue: Gulf View Event Center

No.	Results	Stipulations
1	BTY (Jayme Jameson and Marti Belle) (c) defeated Lexii Gomez and Sofia Castillo	Tag team match for the Shine Tag Team Championship
2	Harlow O'Hara defeated Erica Torres	Singles match
3	Ava Everett defeated Sahara Se7en	Singles match
4	Allie Recks (c) defeated Amber Nova	Singles match for the ACW Women's Championship
5	Natalia Markova (c) defeated Double D Rose by disqualification	Singles match for the Shine Nova Championship
6	Chelsea Durden defeated Katalina Perez	Singles match
7	Kimber Lee and Stormie Lee defeated BTY (Jayme Jameson and Marti Belle) (c)	Tag team match for the Shine Tag Team Championship
8	Ivelisse (c) defeated Allysin Kay by disqualification	Singles match for the Shine Championship
(c) / – the champion(s) heading into the match

== Shine 67 ==
Shine 67
- Promotion: Shine Wrestling
- Date: June 13, 2021
- City: Port Richey, Florida
- Venue: Gulf View Event Center

No.	Results	Stipulations
1	ACR defeated Karma Dean	Singles match
2	Harlow O'Hara defeated Kelsey Raegan	Singles match
3	Brittany Blake defeated The Woad by disqualification	Singles match
4	Amber Nova defeated Sahara Se7en	Singles match
5	Erica Torres defeated Myka Madrid	Singles match
6	Kimber Lee and Stormie Lee (c) defeated The Hex (Allysin Kay and Marti Belle) (with Jayme Jameson)	Tag team match for the Shine Tag Team Championship
7	Ivelisse (c) defeated The Woad	Singles match for the Shine Championship
(c) / – the champion(s) heading into the match

== Shine 68 ==
Shine 68
- Promotion: Shine Wrestling
- Date: September 19, 2021
- City: Clearwater, Florida
- Venue: OCC Roadhouse

No.	Results	Stipulations
1	Amber Nova defeated Kaci Lennox	Singles match
2	Myka Madrid defeated Kelsey Heather	Singles match
3	Tracy Nyxx defeated Alyx Sky	Singles match
4	The Woad defeated Natalia Markova (c)	Street Fight for the Shine Nova Championship
5	ACR defeated Katalina Perez	Singles match
6	The Coven (Chelsea Durden and Erica Torres) (with Vipress) defeated Kelsey Raegan and Sahara Se7en	Tag team match
7	Marti Belle (with Jayme Jameson) defeated Stormie Lee	Singles match
8	Ivelisse (c) defeated Allysin Kay	Steel cage match for the Shine Championship
(c) / – the champion(s) heading into the match

== Shine 69 ==
Shine 69
- Promotion: Shine Wrestling
- Date: October 24, 2021
- City: Clearwater, Florida
- Venue: OCC Roadhouse

No.	Results	Stipulations
1	The Coven (Harlow O'Hara and Vipress) (with Erica Torres) defeated Alyx Sky and Myka Madrid	Tag team match
2	Natalia Markova defeated Erica Torres (with Harlow O'Hara and Vipress)	Singles match
3	Brittany Blake defeated Tracy Nyxx	Singles match
4	Amber Nova defeated The Woad (c) by disqualification	Singles match for the Shine Nova Championship
5	Kelsey Heather defeated Tiffany Nieves	Singles match
6	Santana defeated Kaci Lennox	Singles match
7	Ivelisse (c) defeated Stormie Lee	Singles match for the Shine Championship
(c) / – the champion(s) heading into the match

== Shine 70 ==
Shine 70
- Promotion: Shine Wrestling
- Date: December 12, 2021
- City: Clearwater, Florida
- Venue: OCC Roadhouse

No.	Results	Stipulations
1	Tracy Nyxx defeated Katalina Perez	Singles match
2	Ashley D'Amboise defeated Tina San Antonio	Singles match
3	Renee Michelle defeated Leila Grey	Singles match
4	Santana defeated The Woad (c) by Countout	Singles match for the Shine Nova Championship
5	Devlyn Macabre vs. Tiffany Nieves ended in no contest	Singles match for the Shine Nova Championship
6	Megan Bayne defeated Devlyn Macabre and Tiffany Nieves	Three-way match
7	The Hex (Allysin Kay and Marti Belle) (c) defeated The Coven (Chelsea Durden and Erica Torres) (with Vipress)	Tag team match for the Shine Tag Team Championship
8	Ivelisse defeated Natalia Markova (c)	Singles match for the Shine Championship
(c) / – the champion(s) heading into the match

== Shine 71 ==
Shine 71
- Promotion: Shine Wrestling
- Date: February 6, 2022
- City: Clearwater, Florida
- Venue: OCC Roadhouse

No.	Results	Stipulations	Times
1	Marina Tucker defeated Devlyn Macabre	Singles match	4:58
2	Kelsey Raegan defeated Kaci Lennox	Singles match	6:33
3	Chelsea Durden defeated Katalina Perez	Singles match	8:29
4	The Coven (Kelsey Raegan and Vipress) (with Chelsea Durden) defeated The Hex (Allysin Kay and Marti Belle) (c) by disqualification	Tag team match for the Shine Tag Team Championship	7:47
5	Tracy Nyxx defeated Tiffany Nieves	Singles match	5:58
6	Renee Michelle defeated Tina San Antonio	Singles match	10:40
7	Myka Madrid defeated Lexi Gomez (c)	Singles match for the ACW Women's Championship	8:44
8	Ivelisse and The Woad defeated Natalia Markova and Santana	Do or Die Rules Tag team match	16:40
(c) / – the champion(s) heading into the match

== Shine 72 ==
Shine 72
- Promotion: Shine Wrestling
- Date: April 17, 2022
- City: Clearwater, Florida
- Venue: OCC Roadhouse

No.	Results	Stipulations	Times
1	Kaci Lennox defeated Vanity by pinfall	Singles match	8:32
2	Ashley D'Amboise defeated Tiffany Nieves by pinfall	Singles match	6:05
3	Leila Grey defeated Amber Nova by pinfall	Singles match	9:02
4	Lindsay Snow defeated Erica Torres by submission	Singles match	10:09
5	Renee Michelle defeated The Woad (c) by disqualification	Singles match for the Shine Nova Championship	10:44
6	Myka Madrid (c) defeated Katalina Perez by submission	Singles match for the ACW Women's Championship	8:28
7	Ivelisse (c) defeated Shazza McKenzie by pinfall	Singles match for the Shine Championship	16:56
8	The Coven (Chelsea Durden, Kelsey Raegan and Vipress) defeated The Hex (Allysin Kay and Marti Belle) (c) by pinfall	Three-on-two handicap OCC street fight for the Shine Tag Team Championship	14:53
(c) / – the champion(s) heading into the match

== Shine 73 ==
Shine 73
- Promotion: Shine Wrestling
- Date: June 19, 2022
- City: Clearwater, Florida
- Venue: OCC Roadhouse

No.	Results	Stipulations	Times
1	Allie Recks defeated Labrava	Singles match	7:35
2	Rocky Radley defeated Tiffany Nieves	Singles match	8:12
3	Katalina Perez defeated Jessie Belle	Singles match	6:15
4	Amber Nova defeated Chelsea Durden	Singles match	9:02
5	Ashley D'Amboise defeated Kelsey Raegan	Singles match	5:33
6	Tracy Nyxx defeated Devlyn Macabre	Singles match	6:49
7	Santana defeated Lexi Gomez	Singles match	10:02
8	Renee Michelle defeated The Woad (c) by disqualification	Singles match for the Shine Nova Championship	9:06
9	Ivelisse (c) defeated Myka Madrid	Singles match for the Shine Championship	9:06
(c) / – the champion(s) heading into the match

== Shine ==
Shine
- Promotion: Shine Wrestling
- Date: September 9, 2022
- City: Clearwater, Florida
- Venue: OCC Roadhouse

No.	Results	Stipulations
1	Eliza Haze defeated Jocy J	Singles match
2	Bella Snow and Tia Lynn defeated Boa Ali and Dolly Blackflower	Tag team match
3	Tracy Nyxx defeated Sofia Castillo	Singles match
4	Chelsea Durden defeated Devlyn Macabre	Singles match

== Shine 74 ==
Shine 74
- Promotion: Shine Wrestling
- Date: September 18, 2022
- City: Clearwater, Florida
- Venue: OCC Roadhouse

No.	Results	Stipulations	Times
1^{D}	Bella Snow and Tia Lynn defeated Boa Ali and Dolly Blackflower	Tag team match	—
2	Labrava defeated Devlyn Macabre	Singles match	9:36
3	Harley Cameron defeated Valentina Rossi	Singles match	7:32
4	Kelly Madan and Tina San Antonio defeated Layla Luciano and Tiara James	Tag team match	8:31
5	Kaci Lennox defeated Tracy Nyxx	Singles match	8:58
6	Renee Michelle (c) defeated The Woad	Singles match for the Shine Nova Championship	9:15
7	Tiffany Nieves defeated Eliza Haze	Singles match	5:21
8	Lindsay Snow defeated Lexi Gomez	Singles match	11:55
9	Amber Nova and Ashley D'Amboise defeated The Coven (Chelsea Durden and Kelsey Raegan) (c) by disqualification	Tag team match for the Shine Tag Team Championship	10:39
10	Ivelisse (c) defeated Kimber Lee	Singles match for the Shine Championship	16:07
(c) / – the champion(s) heading into the match; D / – this was a dark match

== Shine 75 ==
Shine 75
- Promotion: Shine Wrestling
- Date: June 18, 2023
- City: Clearwater, Florida
- Venue: OCC Roadhouse

No.	Results	Stipulations	Times
1	Allie Recks defeated Tracy Nyxx	Singles match	6:16
2	Tiffany Nieves defeated Kaitland Alexis	Singles match	9:13
3	Brandi Lauren defeated Jade	Singles match	5:20
4	Renee Michelle (c) defeated The Woad	Lumberjill match for the Shine Nova Championship	7:42
5	The Coven (Chelsea Durden and Kelsey Raegan) (c) defeated Shake And Bake (Scotti and Ski)	Tag team match for the Shine Tag Team Championship	6:45
6	Dynamite DiDi defeated Chelsea Durden	Singles match	4:05
7	Lexi Gomez defeated Labrava	Singles match	8:00
8	Ivelisse (c) defeated Amber Nova and Lindsay Snow	Three-way match for the Shine Championship	11:35
(c) / – the champion(s) heading into the match

== Shine 76 ==
Shine 76
- Promotion: Shine Wrestling
- Date: September 24, 2023
- City: Clearwater, Florida
- Venue: OCC Roadhouse

No.	Results	Stipulations	Times
1	Sofia Castillo defeated Bella Snow	Singles match	5:23
2	Yaide defeated Sahara Se7en	Singles match	9:51
3	Rocky Radley defeated Alivia Rose	Singles match	9:04
4	The OMGZ (Alex Gracia and Kelsey Heather) defeated Shake And Bake (Scotti and Skai)	Tag team match	9:57
5	Tracy Nyxx defeated Kaitland Alexis	Singles match	5:05
6	Lexi Gomez defeated T-Gainz	Singles match	9:32
7	Las Sicarias (Labrava and Tiffany Nieves) defeated The Coven (Chelsea Durden and Kelsey Raegan) (c)	Tag team match for the Shine Tag Team Championship	12:37
8	Amber Nova defeated Ivelisse (c) by disqualification	Singles match for the Shine Championship	11:35
(c) / – the champion(s) heading into the match

== Shine 77 ==
Shine 77
- Promotion: Shine Wrestling
- Date: January 28, 2024
- City: Clearwater, Florida
- Venue: OCC Roadhouse

No.	Results	Stipulations	Times
1	Devlyn Macabre defeated Bella Snow	Singles match	6:07
2	Mila Moore defeated Sofia Castillo	Singles match	6:15
3	Kelsey Heather defeated Emily Locke and Kaitland Alexis	Three-way match	5:01
4	Shake and Bake (Scotti and Skai) defeated Kaci Lennox and Sahara Se7en	Tag team match	7:56
5	Amber Nova (c) defeated Renee Michelle by disqualification	Singles match for the Shine Nova Championship	5:05
6	T-Gainz defeated Alivia Rose	Singles match	8:00
7	Lexi Gomez defeated Yaide	Singles match	8:36
8	Ivelisse (c) defeated Lindsay Snow by countout	Singles match for the Shine Championship	14:31
9	Kelsey Raegan and Lindsay Snow defeated Las Sicarias (Labrava and Tiffany Nieves) (c)	Tag team match for the Shine Tag Team Championship	5:33
(c) / – the champion(s) heading into the match

== Shine 78 ==
Shine 78
- Promotion: Shine Wrestling
- Date: May 18, 2024
- City: Clearwater, Florida
- Venue: OCC Roadhouse

No.	Results	Stipulations	Times
1	Sahara Se7en defeated Gina Sais Quoi	Singles match	10:58
2	Alivia Rose defeated Kaia McKenna	Singles match	9:03
3	Shake and Bake (Scotti and Skai) defeated Brittany Jade and Mila Johnson	Tag team match	11:09
4	Airica Demia defeated Devlyn Macabre	Singles match	9:12
5	Amber Nova (c) defeated Tracy Nyxx	Singles match for the Shine Nova Championship	8:54
6	Kelsey Raegan and Lindsay Snow (c) defeated Chelsea Durden and Lexi Gomez	Singles match for the Shine Tag Team Championship	10:39
7	Ivelisse (c) defeated Miyu Yamashita	Singles match for the Shine Championship	13:47
(c) / – the champion(s) heading into the match

== Shine 79 - The 12th Anniversary Celebration ==
Shine 79 - The 12th Anniversary Celebration
- Promotion: Shine Wrestling
- Date: July 12, 2024
- City: Clearwater, Florida
- Venue: OCC Roadhouse

No.	Results	Stipulations	Times
1	T-Gainz defeated Jazmyne Hao	Singles match	8:19
2	Vicious Vixxens (Kaci Lennox and Sahara Se7en) defeated Brittany Jade an Mila Johnson	Tag team match	8:01
3	Mila Moore defeated Kaitland Alexis	Singles match	3:19
4	Evie De La Rosa defeated Lexi Gomez	Singles match	7:46
5	Kelsey Heather defeated Amber Nova (c)	Singles match for the Shine Nova Championship	7:54
6	Bella Snow defeated Chelsea Durden and Gina Sais Quoi	Three-way match	6:35
7	Labrava Escobar defeated Airica Demia	Singles match	9:38
8	Kelsey Raegan and Lindsay Snow (c) defeated Shake and Bake (Scotti and Skai)	Tag team match for the Shine Tag Team Championship	8:21
9	Ivelisse (c) defeated Xia Brookside	Singles match for the Shine Championship	14:39
(c) / – the champion(s) heading into the match

== Shine 80 ==
Shine 80
- Promotion: Shine Wrestling
- Date: September 29, 2024
- City: Clearwater, Florida
- Venue: OCC Roadhouse

No.	Results	Stipulations
1	Kaylei Harrison defeated Boa Ali	Singles match
2	Kaia McKenna defeated Mila Johnson	Singles match
3	Carolina Cruz defeated Lili Ruiz	Singles match
4	Shake and Bake (Scotti and Skai) defeated Mila Moore and Shelly Benson	Tag team match
5	Lindsay Snow defeated Labrava	Singles match
6	Bella Snow and Sofia Castillo defeated Vicious Vixxens (Kaci Lennox and Sahara Se7en)	Tag team match
7	Joiya Blake defeated Alivia Rose	Singles match
8	Kelsey Heather (c) defeated Lexi Gomez	Singles match for the Shine Nova Championship
9	Ivelisse (c) defeated Evie De La Rosa	Singles match for the Shine Championship
(c) / – the champion(s) heading into the match

== Shine 81 ==
Shine 81
- Promotion: Shine Wrestling
- Date: February 16, 2025
- City: Clearwater, Florida
- Venue: OCC Roadhouse

No.	Results	Stipulations	Times
1	Bella Snow defeated Kaci Lennox	Singles match	6:40
2	Sofia Castillo defeated Carolina Cruz	Singles match	7:56
3	Shake And Bake (Scotti and Skai) defeated Katalina Perez and Lexi Gomez	Tag team match	8:34
4	Kelsey Heather (c) defeated Sara Leon	Singles match for the Shine Nova Championship	8:59
5	J-Rod defeated Alivia Rose	Singles match	6:50
6	Valentina Rossi defeated Jacey Love	Singles match	5:26
7	Mila Moore defeated Izzy Moreno	Singles match	7:22
8	Amber Nova and Bound By Blood (Kelsey Raegan and Lindsay Snow) defeated Las Sicarias (Evie De La Rosa, Ivelisse and Labrava)	Six-woman tag team match	13:48
(c) / – the champion(s) heading into the match

== Shine 82 ==
Shine 82
- Promotion: Shine Wrestling
- Date: May 11, 2025
- City: Clearwater, Florida
- Venue: OCC Roadhouse

No.	Results	Stipulations	Times
1	Alivia Rose, Clara Change and Sirena Veil defeated Jazmyne Hao, Scotti and Sofia Sivan	Six-woman tag team match	7:35
2	Shelly Benson defeated Jacey Love	Singles match	5:06
3	Teal Piper defeated Kaci Lennox	Singles match	8:10
4	Las Sicarias (Evie De La Rosa and Labrava) (c) defeated Amber Nova and Lindsay Snow	Tag team match for the Shine Tag Team Championship	9:19
5	Valentina Rossi defeated Kaia McKenna	Singles match	6:04
6	Izzy Moreno defeated Mila Moore	Singles match	4:00
7	Kelsey Heather (c) defeated Aleah James and Sara Leon	Three-way match for the Shine Nova Championship	5:55
8	Kelsey Raegan (c) defeated Mercedes Martinez by disqualification	Singles match for the Shine Championship	12:58
(c) / – the champion(s) heading into the match

== Shine 83: Lucky 13 - The 13th Anniversary Spectacular ==
Shine 83: Lucky 13 - The 13th Anniversary Spectacular
- Promotion: Shine Wrestling
- Date: August 10, 2025
- City: Clearwater, Florida
- Venue: OCC Roadhouse

No.	Results	Stipulations	Times
1	Ivelisse defeated Zantie Lee	Singles match	—
2	Carolina Cruz defeated Rhiannon Jones	Singles match	7:04
3	Kaia McKenna, Rachel Ley, and Sofia Sivan defeated Gina Sais Quoi, Joiya Blake, and Sahara Se7en	Six-woman Tag Team match	7:38
4	Mila Moore defeated Jacey Love	Singles match	4:20
5	Scotti Sosa (c) defeated Clara Change	Singles match for the WWN Proving Ground Women's Championship	4:20
6	Airica Demia (c) defeated Lindsay Snow	Singles match for the Spark Joshi Pacific Championship	8:45
7	Katalina Perez (with Lexi Gomez) defeated Mila Johnson	Singles match	7:20
8	Izzy Moreno defeated Alivia Rose	Singles match	6:25
9	J-Rod defeated Amber Nova	Singles match	6:32
10	Mercedes Martinez (with Ivelisse) defeated Sara Leon	Singles match	12:51
11	Bella Snow and Sofia Castillo defeated Las Sicarias (Evie De La Rosa and Labrava) (c) (with Ivelisse)	Tag Team match for the Shine Tag Team Championship	9:53
12	Kelsey Raegan (c) defeated Kelsey Heather	Singles match for the Shine Championship	8:11
(c) / – the champion(s) heading into the match

== Shine 84 ==
Shine 84
- Promotion: Shine Wrestling
- Date: November 8, 2025
- City: Clearwater, Florida
- Venue: OCC Roadhouse

No.	Results	Stipulations	Times
1	Vicious Vixxens (Kaci Lennox and Sahara Se7en) defeated Jacey Love and Sofia Sivan	Tag Team match	8:24
2	Airica Demia (c) defeated Joiya Blake	Singles match for the Spark Joshi Pacific Championship	9:04
3	Evie De La Rosa (with Mercedes Martinez) defeated Teal Piper	Singles match	8:06
4	Sara Leon defeated Alivia Rose, Mila Moore, and Valentina Rossi	Four-way match to determine the number one contenders for the Shine Nova Championship	4:48
5	Mercedes Martinez defeated Aleah James	Singles match	8:20
6	Kelsey Heather (c) defeated Izzy Moreno	Singles match for the Shine Nova Championship	10:07
7	Sara Leon defeated Kelsey Heather (c)	Singles match for the Shine Nova Championship	2:35
8	Ivelisse vs. Kelsey Raegan (c) ended in a no–contest	Singles match for the Shine Championship	20:28
(c) / – the champion(s) heading into the match

== Shine 85 ==
Shine 85
- Promotion: Shine Wrestling
- Date: January 11, 2026
- City: Clearwater, Florida
- Venue: OCC Roadhouse

No.	Results	Stipulations
1	Jazmyne Hao defeated Emily Locke	Singles match
2	Bella Snow and Sofia Castillo (c) defeated Vicious Vixxens (Kaci Lennox and Sahara Se7en)	Tag team match for the Shine Tag Team Championship
3	Sara Leon (c) defeated Valentina Rossi	Singles match for the Shine Nova Championship
4	Laynie Luck (c) defeated Ivelisse	Singles match for the WWE Women's ID Championship
5	Kelsey Raegan (c) defeated Evie De La Rosa	Singles match for the Shine Championship
(c) / – the champion(s) heading into the match

== Shine 86 ==
Shine 86
- Promotion: Shine Wrestling
- Date: April 12, 2026
- City: Clearwater, Florida
- Venue: OCC Roadhouse

No.	Results	Stipulations
1	Amber Nova defeated Joiya Blake	Singles match
2	Sofia Sivan defeated Alivia Rose	Singles match
3	Valentina Rossi defeated Carolina Cruz and Rachel Ley	Three-way match
4	Ivelisse defeated Harley Hudson	Singles match
5	Madi Maxx defeated Izzy Moreno	Singles match
6	Vicious Vixxens (Kaci Lennox and Sahara Se7en) defeated The Final Act (Bella Snow and Sofia Castillo) (c)	Tag team match for the Shine Tag Team Championship
(c) / – the champion(s) heading into the match

== See also ==
- Shimmer Volumes
- List of NCW Femme Fatales events
