= Brandi Lauren =

American model and professional wrestler (born 1996)

Personal information
- Born: Brandi Lauren Pawelek; September 26, 1996 (age 29) Buffalo, New York, U.S.

Professional wrestling career
- Ring name(s): Ava Storie; Brandi Lauren; Kayci Quinn; Skyler Story
- Billed height: 5 ft 9 in (175 cm)
- Billed weight: 135 lb (61 kg)
- Billed from: Buffalo, New York
- Trained by: Jay Lethal
- Debut: March 5, 2016
- Retired: August 19, 2022

Brandi Lauren Pawelek (born September 26, 1996) is an American model and professional wrestler better known by her ring name Brandi Lauren. She has worked in the past for Total Nonstop Action Wrestling (TNA), having previously worked as Ava Storie between 2017 and 2018. She is also known for her time with WWE, where she performed on the Evolve brand under the ring name Skyler Story and for her time on the independent circuit, notable wrestling for Shine Wrestling.

== Professional wrestling career ==
=== Independent circuit (2016–2020) ===
On February 18, 2017, under the name Brandi Lauren, she defeated Lacey Lane at FTPW Fight Club Round 3 to become the inaugural Full Throttle Pro Wrestling Ladies Champion. On March 30 at OCW/FTPW Downtown Throwdown, she lost the title in a gauntlet match as Lindsey Snow become the eventual winner and new champion.

=== Shine Wrestling (2016–2020) ===
Lauren made her debut in Shine Wrestling against Aria Blake for the ACW Women's Championship in a losing effort. At Shine 39 Lauren lost against Jessie Belle Smothers. She also suffered losses against Malia Hosaka at Shine 40 and Thea Trinidad at Shine 41.

=== Impact Wrestling (2017–2018) ===
Lauren appeared at the Impact Wrestling tapings in March 2017. She wrestled against Brandi Rhodes on March 2 in a match that ended in a no contest. On the March 4 episode of Impact Wrestling, she wrestled in a gauntlet battle royal won by ODB for the number one contendership to the Impact Wrestling Knockouts Championship. Lauren also competed in the company's One Night Only pay-per-view, One Night Only: Victory Road – Knockouts Knockdown, wrestling a match against Angelina Love in a losing effort.

Lauren appeared on the April 20, 2017, episode of Impact Wrestling, under the new name of Ava Storie, challenging for the GFW Women's Championship but was defeated by champion Christina Von Eerie. On April 21, she was defeated by Laurel Van Ness. On April 22 at One Night Only: Turning Point 2017, she lost a rematch against Van Ness. On October 1, Ava got her first victory in Impact against Amber Nova.

On January 31, 2018, Storie's profile was officially moved to the alumni section of the official Impact Wrestling website, confirming her departure from the company.

=== WWE (2018–2021) ===
Storie debuted during WWE's NXT May 2018 tapings, where she competed under the name of Brandi Lauren in a losing effort to Lacey Evans. On August 31, 2020 it was reported that Lauren had signed with WWE for their NXT brand. On October 7, 2020 WWE, in an official press release, announced that she had signed with the company in the NXT brand. On May 19, 2021 Lauren was released by WWE.

=== Return to Impact Wrestling (2021–2022) ===
On the August 19 episode of Impact!, Lauren made her Impact return, losing to Melina.

== Championships and accomplishments ==
- Full Throttle Pro Wrestling
  - FTPW Ladies Championship (2 time)
