= Shine Nova Championship =

Professional wrestling women's championship

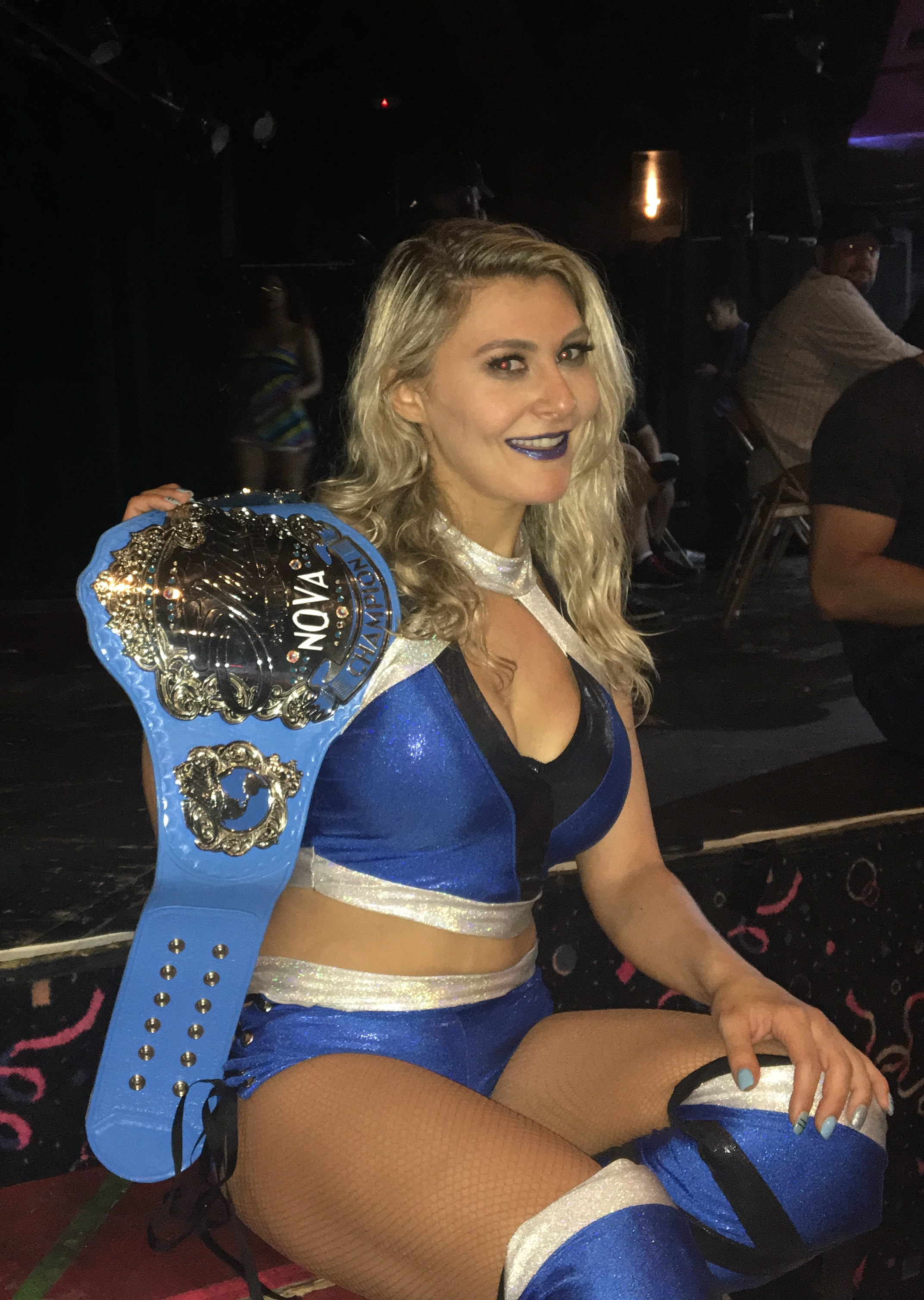
- Candy Cartwright who is the second Shine Nova Champion with the Shine Nova Championship belt.

Details
- Promotion: Shine Wrestling
- Date established: May 12, 2017
- Current champion: Kelsey Heather
- Date won: July 12, 2024
Statistics
- First champion: Priscilla Kelly
- Most reigns: All titleholders (1 reign)
- Longest reign: Natalia Markova (646 days)
- Shortest reign: Ivelisse (105 days)

The Shine Nova Championship is a championship contested in the professional wrestling promotion Shine Wrestling. Kelsey Heather is the current champion in her first reign.

== History ==
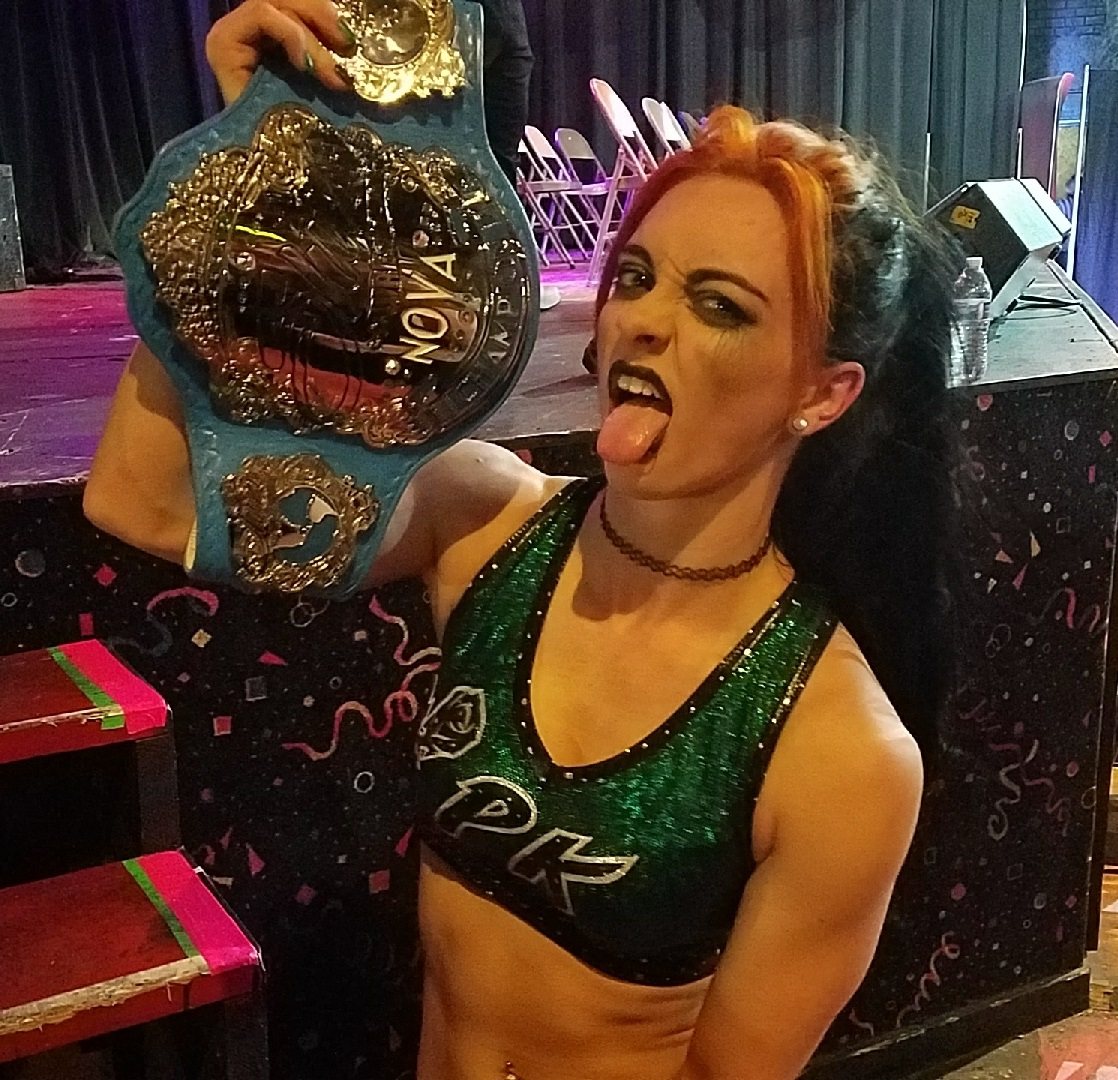
Inaugural Shine Nova Champion, Priscilla Kelly

The Nova Championship was first announced on SHINE's Facebook account which stated that there would be a championship for up and coming talent. The tournament started on July 14 at SHINE 43 and ended on July 16 at SHINE 44.

As of 19 September 2021, there have been 6 championship reigns with 6 different champions. The inaugural champion was Priscilla Kelly. She won the title by defeating Candy Cartwright at Shine 44 on July 16, 2017. Priscilla Kelly successfully defend her title against ACR at Full Impact Pro's Everything Burns Event February 2, 2018 at The Orpheum in Ybor City. Kelly again defended her title at Shine 49 where she was defeated by Candy Cartwright. On Shine 54, Shotzi Blackheart defeated Aja Perera to be the fourth champion. The fifth and sixth champions, Natalia Markova and The WOAD, won their titles on December 14, 2019 and September 19, 2021, respectively.

== Inaugural Championship Tournament (2017) ==
The tournament was held over 2 nights at the "Shine 43" and "Shine 44" events at the Orpheum in Ybor City, Florida.

Quarterfinals
Leah Vaughan
Priscilla Kelly	Pin
Kiera Hogan	Pin
Aja Perera
Jordynne Grace	Pin
Aria Blake
Candy Cartwright	Bye (Note: Candy Cartwright proceeded from the first round directly to the Semi-Finals due to a draw in the Ivelisse vs. Holidead match at Shine 43.)
–

Semifinals
Priscilla Kelly	Pin
Kiera Hogan
Candy Cartwright	Pin
Jordynne Grace

Finals
Candy Cartwright
Priscilla Kelly	Pin

== Reigns ==
Key
No.	Overall reign number
Reign	Reign number for the specific champion
Days	Number of days held
Defenses	Number of successful defenses
+	Current reign is changing daily

No.	Champion	Championship change			Reign statistics			Notes	Ref.
No.	Champion	Date	Event	Location	Reign	Days	Defenses	Notes	Ref.
Shine Wrestling
1	Priscilla Kelly	July 16, 2017	Shine 44	Ybor City, FL	1	237	7	Defeated Candy Cartwright in the tournament final to become the inaugural champion.	
2	Candy Cartwright	March 10, 2018	Shine 49	Woodside, NY	1	237	3		
3	Aja Perera	November 2, 2018	Shine 54	Ybor City, FL	1	189	5		
4	Shotzi Blackheart	May 10, 2019	Shine 58	Livonia, MI	1	124	4		
—	Vacated	September 11, 2019	Shine 62	New York City, NY	—	—	—	Title vacated after Blackheart signed with the WWE.	
5	Natalia Markova	December 14, 2019	Shine 64	Chicago, IL	1	645	4	Defeated Lindsey Snow in a tournament final to win the vacant championship.	
6	The Woad	September 19, 2021	Shine 68	Clearwater, FL	1	273	4	This was a Street Fight.	
7	Renee Michelle	June 19, 2022	Shine 73	Clearwater, FL	1	434	4		
8	Ivelisse	August 27, 2023	WWNLive SuperShow - Mercury Rising 2023	Clearwater, FL	1	105	1		
9	Amber Nova	December 10, 2023	WWN First Annual Heath D. Schneider Memorial Battle For The Belts	Clearwater, FL	1	215	2		
10	Kelsey Heather	July 12, 2024	Shine 79 - The 12th Anniversary Celebration	Clearwater, FL	1	420+	3		
