= Shine Tag Team Championship =

Professional wrestling women's tag team championship

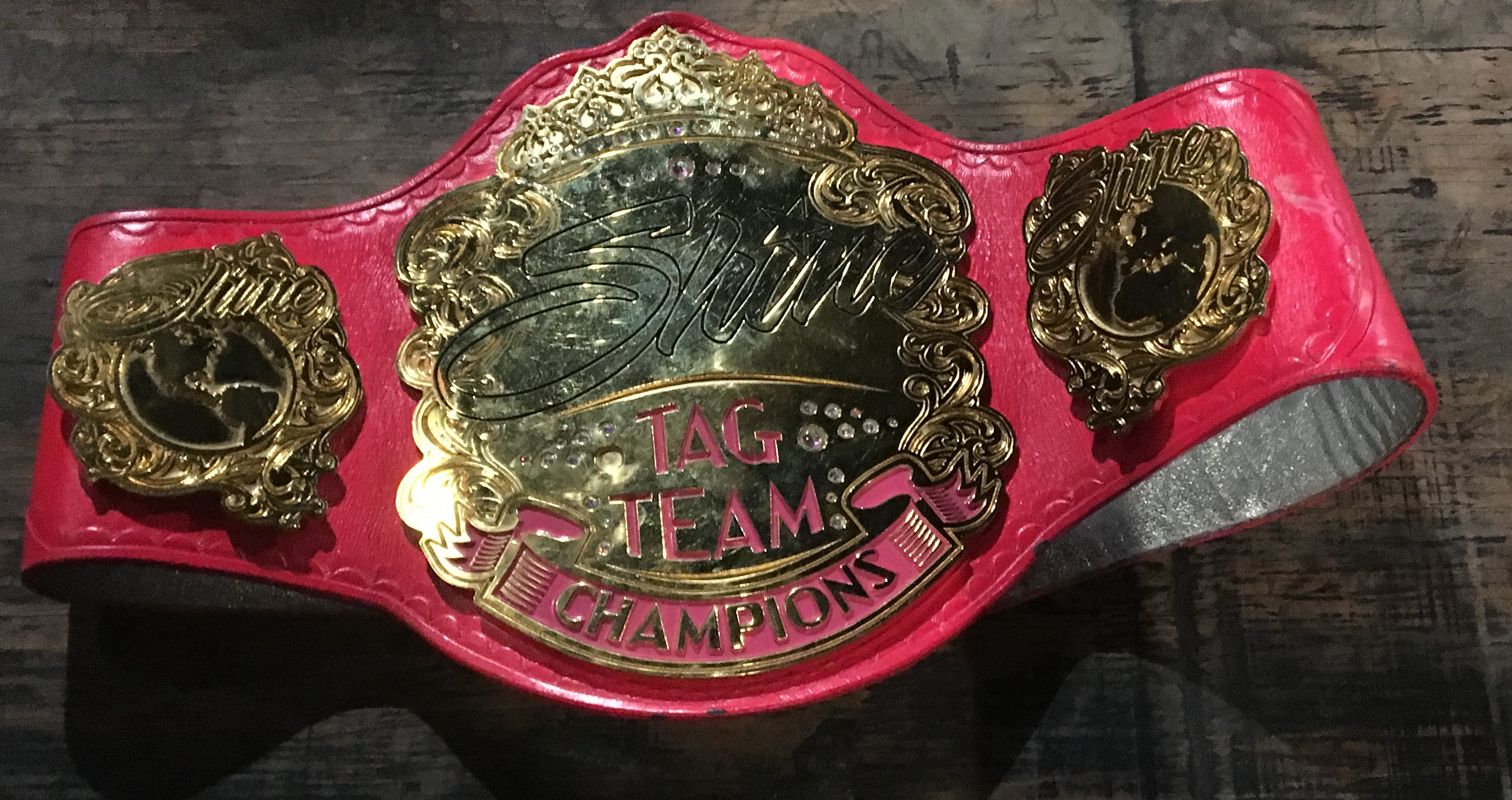
- The current Shine Tag Team Championship belt with side plates

Details
- Promotion: Shine Wrestling
- Date established: February 28, 2014
- Current champions: Vicious Vixxens (Kaci Lennox and Sahara Se7en)
- Date won: April 12, 2026
Statistics
- First champions: The Lucha Sisters (Leva Bates and Mia Yim)
- Most reigns: As a team (2 reigns): BTY (Jayme Jameson and Marti Belle); As an individual (3 reigns): Marti Belle
- Longest reign: The Coven (Chelsea Durden, Kelsey Raegan and Vipress) (525 days)
- Shortest reign: Team Aye (Aja Perera and Big Swole) and The Lucha Sisters (Leva Bates and Mia Yim) (119 days)
- Oldest champion: Malia Hosaka (45 years)
- Youngest champion: Kimber Lee (24 years)
- Heaviest champion: Legendary (Brandi Wine and Malia Hosaka) (280 lb. combined)
- Lightest champion: The Lucha Sisters (Leva Bates and Mia Yim) (239 lb. combined)

The Shine Tag Team Championship is the tag team championship contested in the professional wrestling promotion Shine Wrestling.

== Inaugural Championship Tournament (2014) ==
The tournament was held in one night at the "Shine 17" event on February 28, 2014, at the Orpheum in Ybor City, Florida.

The tournament brackets were:

Quarterfinals
Made in Sin (Allysin Kay and Taylor Made)	Pin
The West Coast Connection (Su Yung and Tracy Taylor)
The S-N-S Express (Jessie Belle and Sassy Stephie)	Pin
MsEerie (Christina Von Eerie and MsChif)
The Buddy System (Heidi Lovelace and Solo Darling)	Pin
Legendary (Brandi Wine and Malia Hosaka)
The Lucha Sisters (Leva Bates and Mia Yim)	Pin
Kimber Bombs (Cherry Bomb and Kimber Lee)

Semifinals
Made in Sin	Pin
The Buddy System
The Lucha Sisters	Pin
The S-N-S Express

Finals
The Lucha Sisters	Pin
Made in Sin

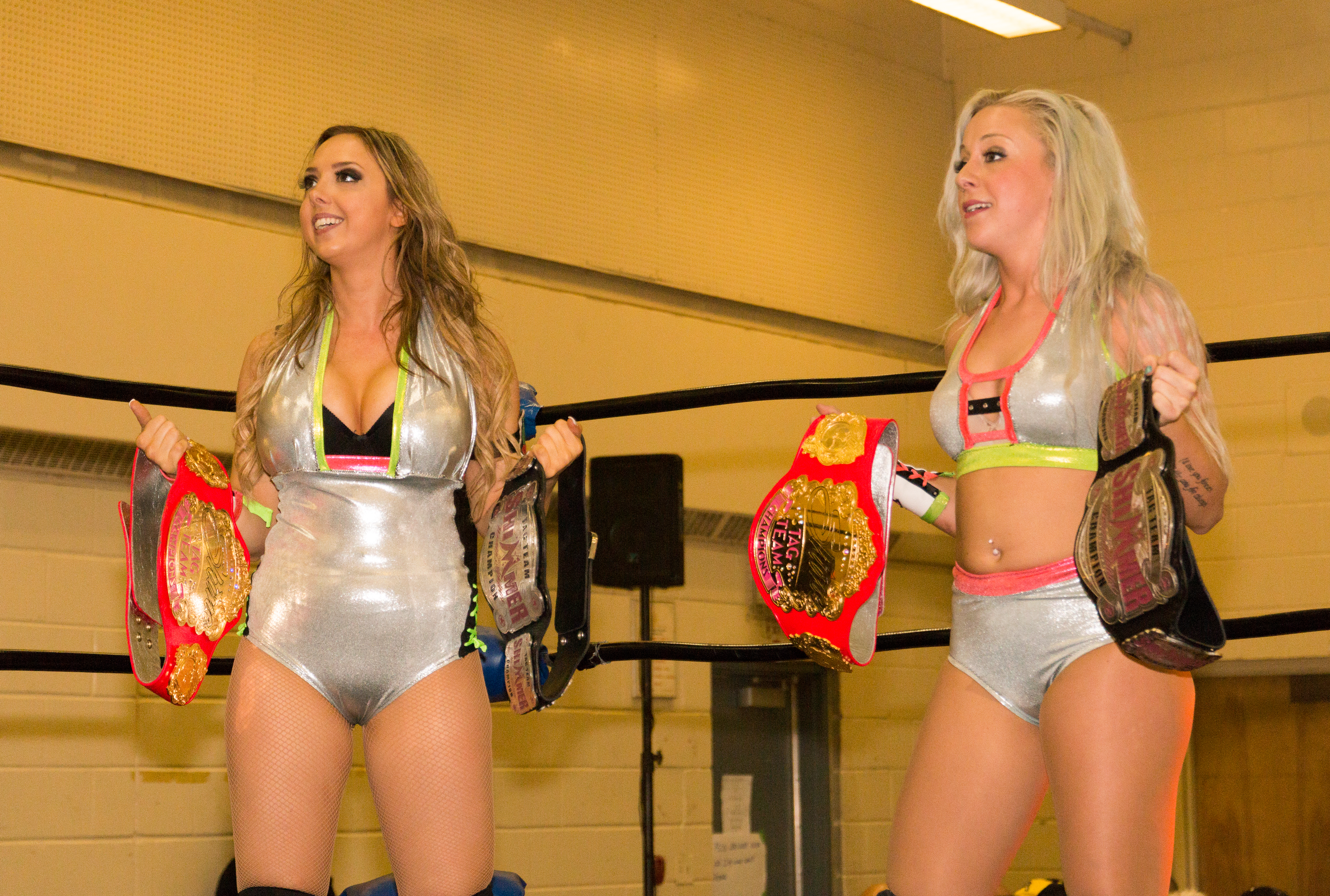
Former champions The Kimber Bombs - Cherry Bomb left and Kimber Lee — with the Shine Tag Team championship belts (the red leather belts) and the Shimmer Tag Team Championship belts

== Reigns ==
Key
No.	Overall reign number
Reign	Reign number for the specific team—reign numbers for the individuals are in parentheses, if different
Days	Number of days held
Defenses	Number of successful defenses
+	Current reign is changing daily

No.	Champion	Championship change			Reign statistics			Notes	Ref.
No.	Champion	Date	Event	Location	Reign	Days	Defenses	Notes	Ref.
Shine Wrestling
1	The Lucha Sisters (Leva Bates and Mia Yim)	February 28, 2014	Shine 17	Ybor City, FL	1	119	3	Defeated Made in Sin (Allysin Kay and Taylor Made) in a tournament finals to become the inaugural champions.	
2	Legendary (Brandi Wine and Malia Hosaka)	June 27, 2014	Shine 20	Ybor City, FL	1	252	3		
3	The Kimber Bombs (Cherry Bomb and Kimber Lee)	March 6, 2015	Shine 25	Ybor City, FL	1	217	3		
—	Vacated	October 2, 2015	Shine 30	Ybor City, FL	—	—	—	Lexie Fyfe stripped The Kimber Bombs of the championship due Cherry Bomb's shoulder injury	
4	BTY (Jayme Jameson and Marti Belle)	December 11, 2015	Shine 31	Ybor City, FL	1	371	4	Defeated The Lucha Sisters (Leva Bates and Mia Yim) in tournament final to win the vacant championship.	
5	Raquel and Santana Garrett	December 16, 2016	Shine 39	Ybor City, FL	1	147	2		
6	Las Sicarias (Ivelisse and Mercedes Martinez)	May 12, 2017	Shine 42	Ybor City, FL	1	434	5		
7	Twisted Sisterz (Holidead and Thunder Rosa)	July 20, 2018	Shine 52	Ybor City, FL	1	183	3	This was a Four-way tag team match elimination match, also involving the teams of The Cutie Pie Club (Kiera Hogan and Dementia D’Rose) and #Team SPAM (Aja Perera and Aerial Monroe)	
8	Rainbow Bright (Gabby Gilbert and Luscious Latasha)	January 19, 2019	Shine 56	Woodside, NY	1	245	3		
9	Team Aye (Aja Perera and Big Swole)	September 21, 2019	Shine 61	New York City, NY	1	119	1	This was a no disqualification, no count-out match.	
10	BTY (Jayme Jameson and Marti Belle)	January 18, 2020	Evolve 144	Fern Park, FL	2	371	2		
11	Kimber Lee and Stormie Lee	January 23, 2021	Shine 66	Port Richey, FL	1 (2, 1)	295	1		
12	The Hex (Allysin Kay and Marti Belle)	November 14, 2021	WWN Supershow: Battle Of The Belts	Clearwater, FL	1 (1, 3)	154	2		
13	The Coven (Chelsea Durden, Kelsey Raegan and Vipress)	April 17, 2022	Shine 72	Clearwater, FL	1	525	2	This was a three-on-two handicap OCC street fight	
14	Las Sicarias (Labrava and Tiffany Nieves)	September 24, 2023	Shine 76	Clearwater, FL	1	126	0		
15	Kelsey Raegan and Lindsay Snow	January 28, 2024	Shine 77	Clearwater, FL	1	322	2		
16	Las Sicarias (Evie De La Rosa and Labrava)	December 15, 2024	WWN Supershow: Battle Of The Belts	Clearwater, FL	1 (1, 2)	238	1		
17	The Final Act (Bella Snow and Sofia Castillo)	August 10, 2024	Shine 83: Lucky 13 - The 13th Anniversary Spectacular	Clearwater, FL	1	245	1		
18	Vicious Vixxens (Kaci Lennox and Sahara Se7en)	April 12, 2026	Shine 86	Clearwater, FL	1	197+	0		

== Combined reigns ==
As of October 26, 2026.

†	Indicates the current champion

=== By team ===
Rank	Team	No. of reigns	Combined defenses	Combined days
1	BTY (Jayme Jameson and Marti Belle)	2	6	742
2	The Coven (Chelsea Durden, Kelsey Reagan and Vipress)	1	2	525
3	Las Sicarias (Ivelisse and Mercedes Martinez)	1	5	434
4	Kelsey Raegan and Lindsay Snow	1	0	322
5	Kimber Lee and Stormie Lee	1	1	295
6	Legendary (Brandi Wine and Malia Hosaka)	1	3	252
7	The Act (Bella Snow and Sofia Castillo)	1	1	245
7	Rainbow Bright (Gabby Gilbert and Luscious Latasha)	1	3	245
9	Las Sicarias (Evie De La Rosa and Labrava)	1	1	238
10	The Kimber Bombs (Cherry Bomb and Kimber Lee)	1	3	217
11	Vicious Vixxens (Kaci Lennox and Sahara Se7en) †	1	0	197+
12	Twisted Sisterz (Holidead and Thunder Rosa)	1	3	183
13	The Hex (Allysin Kay and Marti Belle)	1	2	154
14	Raquel and Santana Garrett	1	2	147
15	Las Sicarias (Labrava and Tiffany Nieves)	1	0	126
16	The Lucha Sisters (Leva Bates and Mia Yim)	1	3	119
16	Team Aye (Aja Perera and Big Swole)	1	1	119

=== By wrestler ===
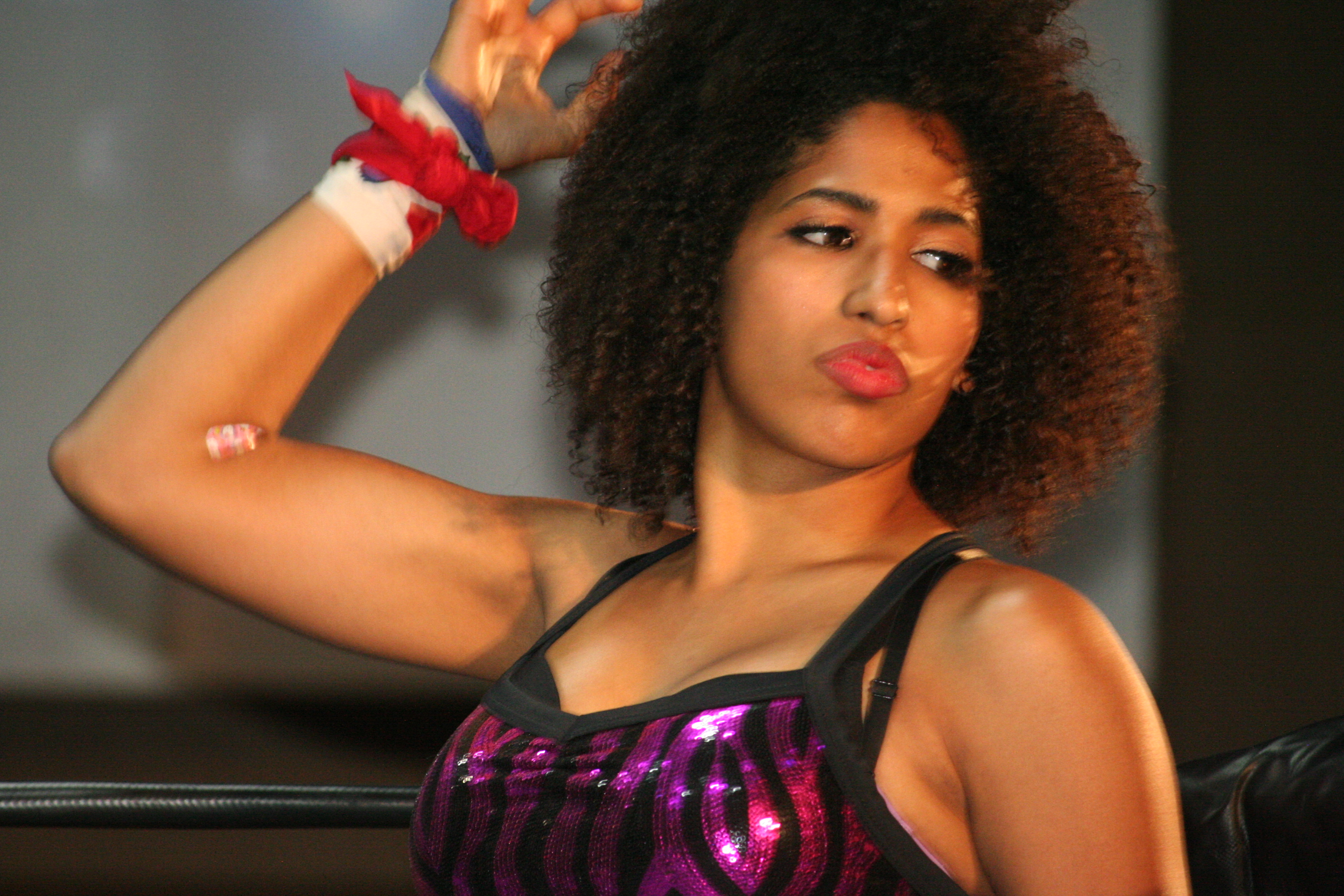
The most combined days as an individual Marti Belle at 896 days.

Rank	Wrestler	No. of reigns	Combined defenses	Combined days
1	Marti Belle	3	8	896
2	Jayme Jameson	2	6	742
3	Kimber Lee	2	4	513
4	Chelsea Durden	1	2	525
4	Kelsey Reagan	1	2	525
4	Vipress	1	2	525
7	Ivelisse	1	5	434
7	Mercedes Martinez	1	5	434
9	Labrava	2	1	364
10	Kelsey Raegan	1	0	322
10	Lindsay Snow	1	0	322
12	Stormie Lee	1	1	295
13	Brandi Wine	1	3	252
13	Malia Hosaka	1	3	252
15	Bella Snow	1	1	245
15	Gabby Gilbert	1	3	245
15	Luscious Latasha	1	3	245
15	Sofia Castillo	1	1	245
19	Evie De La Rosa	1	1	238
20	Cherry Bomb	1	3	217
21	Kaci Lennox †	1	0	197+
21	Sahara Se7en †	1	0	197+
23	Holidead	1	3	183
23	Thunder Rosa	1	3	183
25	Allysin Kay	1	2	154
26	Raquel	1	2	147
26	Santana Garrett	1	2	147
28	Tiffany Nieves	1	0	126
29	Leva Bates	1	3	119
29	Mia Yim	1	3	119
29	Aja Perera	1	1	119
29	Big Swole	1	1	119

== See also ==
- Women's World Tag Team Championship
