= Leah Vaughan =

Canadian professional wrestler

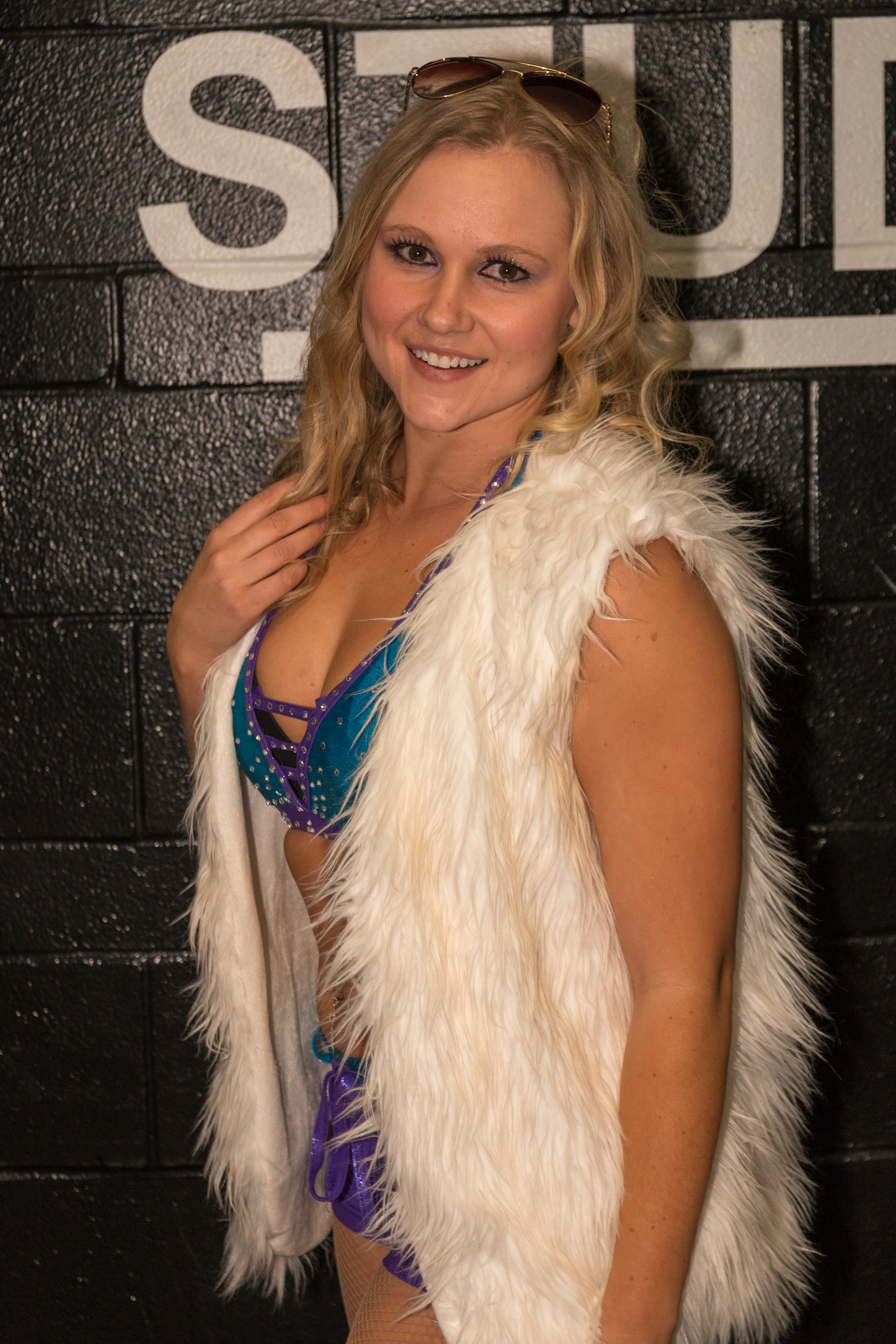
- Vaughan in 2016

Personal information
- Born: October 1, 1987 (age 38) London, Ontario, Canada
- Education: University of Windsor; Fanshawe College

Professional wrestling career
- Ring name(s): Leah Vaughan; Leah Von Dutch
- Billed height: 5 ft 7 in (170 cm)
- Billed weight: 125 lb (57 kg)
- Trained by: Derek Wylde; Shawn Spears; Rob Fuego; Taylor Wilde; Marcus Marquez; Cherry Bomb; Truth Martini
- Debut: 2011

Leah Vaughan (born October 1, 1987) is a Canadian professional wrestler. She was formerly known as Leah Von Dutch.

== Professional wrestling career ==
=== Early career (2011–2012) ===
Vaughan has said "I always wanted to be a wrestler since I was 12 years old. I was about 19 years old when I thought this could actually be a reality and when I was 24 I decided to pursue my dream." She got her start in early 2011 where she would make appearances on the periphery of wrestling - ring announcing, acting as referee, selling tickets and merchandise. She was also paired up with Cody Deaner at NEO Wrestling, whom she acted as a manager for. Vaughan received some early training from Derek Wylde, but conflicting schedules made it difficult to steadily train. She made her in-ring debut in September 2011 against Cherry Bomb; that same month, she won an essay contest arranged by former pro-wrestler Edge which has as its prize a scholarship for training at Squared Circle Training in Toronto.

She was named by the website DivaDirt as one of "The Five to Watch" in 2012.

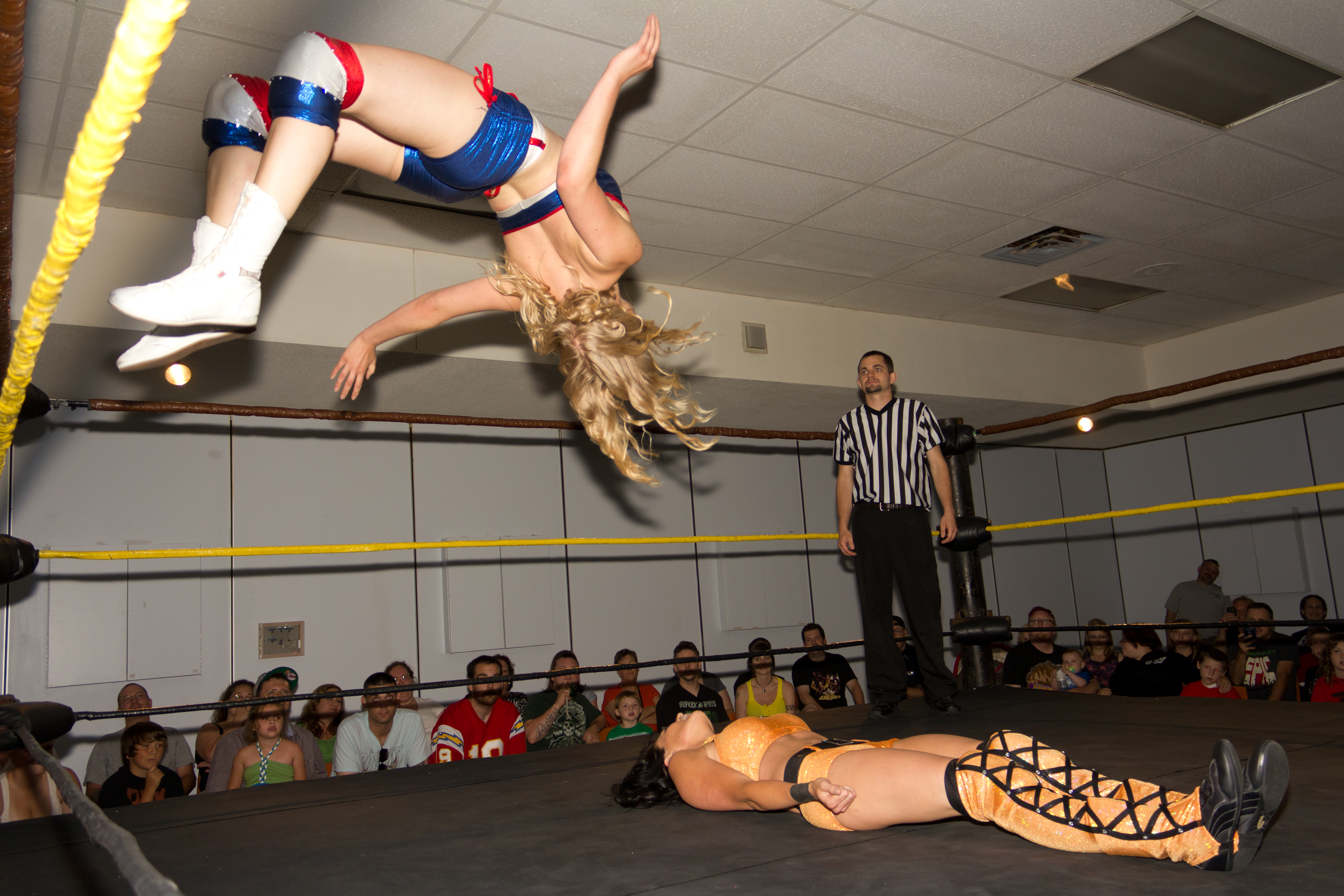
Leah Von Dutch executing the Flying Dutchman manoeuver (aka the Asai Moonsault) on Ianna Titus in 2012.

=== Independent circuit (2013–present) ===
Vaughan has made appearances with Chikara, where she faced Sara Del Rey twice. She appeared at the April 2013 SHIMMER tapings, where she was part of a six-man tag team match on the first day of tapings. The following day, she made her on camera appearance when she competed against Rhia O'Reilly in a match for SHIMMER Volume 56.

She has made multiple appearances with Shine Wrestling, appearing on shows #6, 13, 16, 19 and 22 to 25. She has also appeared with Ring of Honor, Shine Wrestling, 2CW, Reina x World and nCw Femmes Fatales. She has done several tours of the United Kingdom and Europe, in 2013 and 2014 where she appeared in about a dozen different shows there She announced in April 2016 that she had signed a deal with World Wonder Ring Stardom.

She had appeared on several occasions in the World Wrestling Entertainment, acting as one of Adam Rose's Rosebuds.

In March 2017 Vaughan became the first Women's champion for Clash Wrestling, though she lost it to Nevaeh three months later.

On September 8, 2016, Vaughan, as Leah Von Dutch, was defeated by Ember Moon at an NXT taping.

In September 2017, Vaughan announced she was taking a break from professional wrestling to "focus on other projects".

== Personal life ==
In addition to wrestling, she has also made an appearance in a music video by the band The Creekside Strays. as well as one by Joey Stylez. She has a degree in Kinesiology from University of Windsor and an Esthetics diploma from Fanshawe College in London.

== Championships and accomplishments ==
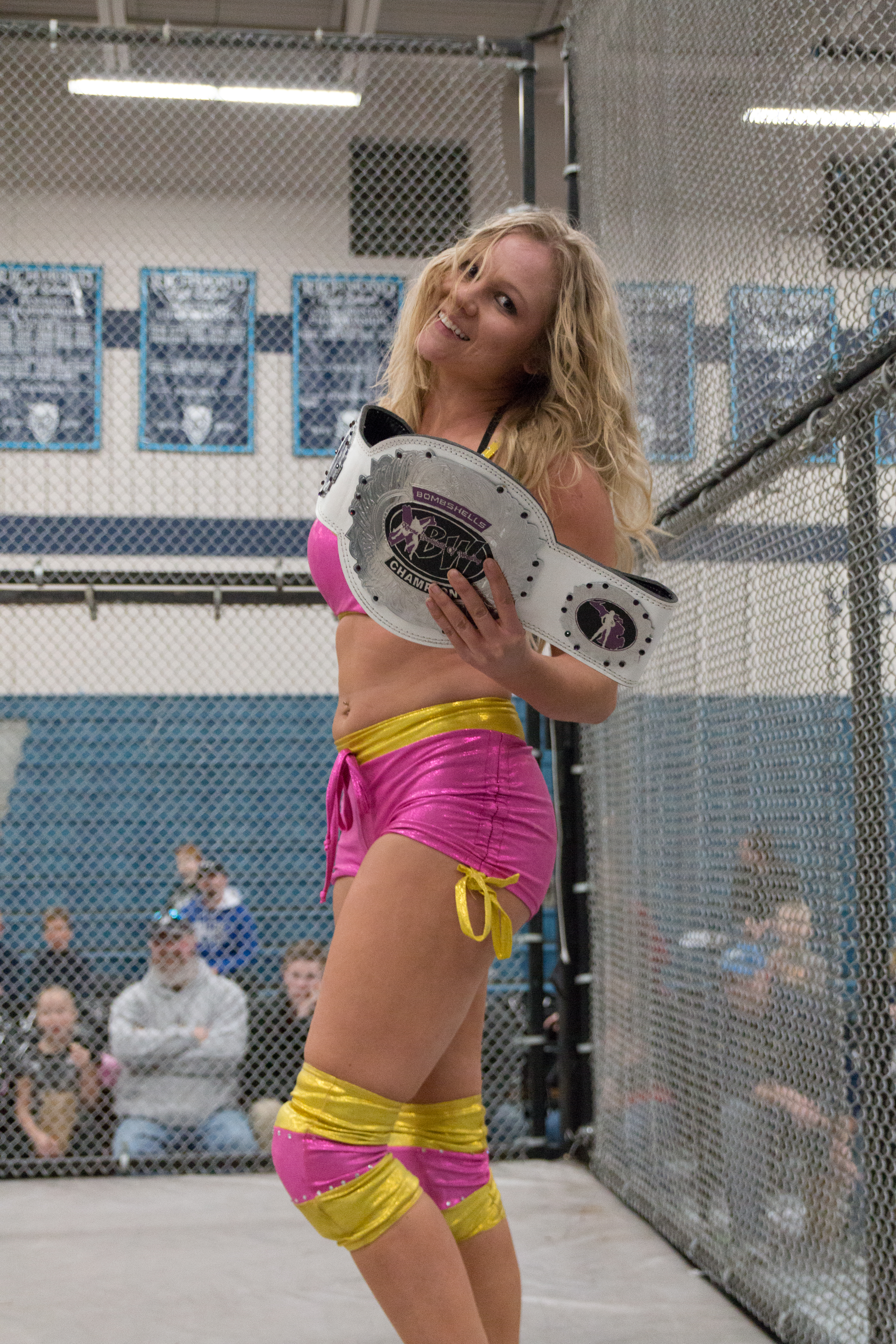
Von Dutch with the Xtreme Bombshell Wrestling's Bombshells Championship belt

- Absolute Intense Wrestling
  - Absolute Women's Championship (1 time)
- Clash Wrestling
  - CLASH Women's Champion (1 time)
- Pure Wrestling Association
  - PWA Women's Elite Championship (1 time)
- Vicious Outcast Wrestling
  - Queen of the Ring (1 time, current)
- Xtreme Bombshell Wrestling
  - XBW Bombshells Championship (1 time)
