= Shut Up and Shoot! =

- Directed by: Silvio Pollio
- Written by: Silvio Pollio
- Produced by: Silvio Pollio
- Starring: Silvio Pollio; Joe Cortese; Tom Sizemore; Gary Busey; Daniel Baldwin; John Savage
- Release date: 2006
- Country: United States

Shut Up and Shoot! is a 2006 comedy film directed by Silvio Pollio and starring Silvio Pollio, Joe Cortese, Tom Sizemore, Gary Busey and John Savage.

== Cast ==
- Silvio Pollio
- Joe Cortese
- Tom Sizemore
- Gary Busey
- John Savage
- Debra Wilson

== Release ==
The film was released in USA on 27 June 2006.
