= Amber Nova =

American professional wrestler

Personal information
- Born: Amber Flora; November 2, 1991 (age 35) Hackettstown, New Jersey, U.S.

Professional wrestling career
- Ring name(s): Amber Nova; Nova Girl; Amber Flora
- Billed height: 5 ft 4 in (162 cm)
- Billed weight: 106 lb (48 kg)
- Trained by: Lince Dorado; Chasyn Rance; Ivelisse Velez; Aaron Epic
- Debut: April 1, 2016

Amber Flora (born November 2, 1991) is an American professional wrestler better known by her ring name Amber Nova. She is currently working for SHINE Wrestling where she is a former Shine Nova Champion. She had previously made appearances for Impact Wrestling, All Elite Wrestling and NXT.

== Early life ==
Flora was born in Hackettstown, New Jersey, on November 2, 1991 and grew up in Hilton Head Island, South Carolina she auditioned for WWE Tough Enough in 2015 but wasn't selected as a contestant.

== Professional wrestling career ==
=== Independent circuit (2016–present) ===
Nova made her in ring debut for Championship Wrestling Entertainment (CWE) at the CWE Rise Of A Queen Tournament where she faced Santana Garrett in a first round match but was defeated. She made her debut for Shine Wrestling (SHINE) at SHINE 48 where she defeated Chelsea Durden. On December 10, 2023 at the World Wrestling Network (WWN) First Annual Heath D. Schneider Memorial Battle For The Belts Nova defeated Ivelisse to win the Shine Nova Championship for the first time in her career.

=== Impact Wrestling (2017–2018) ===
Nova made her debut for Impact Wrestling as a jobber where she faced Allie in a losing effort. She made her return on July 20, 2017 where she was squashed by Impact Knockouts Champion Sienna. her final match for Impact was on March 29, 2018 in another squash match against Su Yung.

=== NXT (2018–2019) ===
Nova made her debut for NXT on August 8, 2018, where she faced Nikki Cross but was defeated, in her next appearance on January 23, 2019 she appeared as a heel and teamed up with Tanea Brooks to face Io Shirai and Kairi Sane in a Tag team match which they were defeated.

=== All Elite Wrestling (2021–2022) ===
Nova made her debut for AEW on the April 13, 2021 episode of AEW Dark where she teamed with Queen Aminata and faced the team of Red Velvet and Big Swole but were defeated.

== Championships and accomplishments ==
- Shine Wrestling
  - Shine Nova Championship (1 time)

== Personal life ==
Before becoming a professional wrestler Flora worked as an emergency medical technician and studied at the Technical College of the Lowcountry. Her father worked as a mechanic and incorporated it into her gimmick using the number 73 on her custom Chevy Nova. On October 23, 2026 Flora was arrested in Orlando, Florida for driving under the influence and refusing to submit to DUI Testing. She was released after posting a $1,000 bond for each count and appeared in court on October 24th.
