= Shine Wrestling =

Professional wrestling promotion based in New York City

- Logo used since 2025
- Founded: 2012
- Style: Women's professional wrestling
- Headquarters: Largo, Florida
- Founder(s): Sal Hamaoui; Lexie Fyfe
- Owner(s): Sal Hamaoui; Jerry DuFrain
- Parent: WWNLive
- Sister: Shimmer Women Athletes (2012-2021)
- Website: shinewrestling.com

Shine Wrestling (stylized as SHINE Wrestling and often referred to simply as SHINE) is an American independent women's professional wrestling promotion based in Largo, Florida. It was the sister promotion to Shimmer Women Athletes which closed down in 2021. The promotion also airs events on Internet pay-per-view (iPPV) via WWNLive.

== History ==
Shine was created as the sister promotion of Shimmer Women Athletes, and it was established by Sal Hamaoui in 2012. It held its first event Shine 1 on July 20, 2012. Sal Hamaoui is the booker for the promotion.

The company use to hold its events at The Orpheum in Ybor City, Florida. Now it runs shows in Woodside, NY and Queens, NY.

In 2015, WWNLive opened its own training facility in Trinity, Florida named "World Wrestling Network Academy", which Shine shares with Proving Ground and Full Impact Pro.

On October 24, 2016, WWNLive and FloSports announced a new streaming service, which would host events held by the WWNLive promotions, including Shine.

Shine Wrestling logo used from 2023 to 2025

== Championships ==
As of November 10, 2026

Championship	Current champion(s)	Reign	Date won	Days held	Notes
Shine Championship	Kelsey Raegan	1	March 9, 2025	611+	Defeated Ivelisse at WWN Supershow: Uprising.
Shine Tag Team Championship	Vicious Vixxens (Kaci Lennox and Sahara Se7en)	1 (1, 1)	April 12, 2026	212+	Defeated Kelsey Raegan and Lindsay Snow at Shine 86.
Shine Nova Championship	Mercedes Martinez	1	July 5, 2026	128+	Defeated Sara Leon at Shine 87.
