= WSU King and Queen of the Ring =

King and Queen of the Ring, also known as Queen and King of the Ring, is an annual professional wrestling mixed tag team tournament promoted by Women Superstars Uncensored (WSU). From 2006 to 2012, WSU co-promoted the tournament with National Wrestling Superstars (NWS), but in 2013 partnered up with Combat Zone Wrestling (CZW) for the tournament.

== 2006 ==
The winners of the 2006 King and Queen Tournament were Julio Dinero and Kara Slice.

== 2007 ==
The winners of the 2007 King and Queen tournament were Danny Demanto and Melissa Stripes. The first round matches were three-way matches.

Round One
Archadia and Alicia | Pin
Nicky Oceans and Alexa Thatcher / Cabbie and Cindy Rogers
Bison Bravado and Amy Lee | No-contest
Corrupted Youth and Missy Sampson / Fever and Z-Barr
Danny Demanto and Melissa Stripes | Pin
Shane Taylor and Sumie Sakai / Johnny Candido and Alere Little Feather

Round Two
BYE
Archadia and Alicia
BYE
Danny Demanto and Melissa Stripes

Finals
Danny Demanto and Melissa Stripes | Pin
Archadia and Alicia

== 2008 ==
The winners of the 2008 King and Queen tournament were Rhett Titus and Nikki Roxx (who interjected themselves into the final round match).

Round One
Nicky Oceans and Alexa Thatcher | Pin
JD Smoothie and Becky Bayless
Bison Bravado and Mercedes Martinez | Pin
Pastor George and Amber
Devon Moore and Luscious Latasha | Pin
Mikey Pacifica and Rebecca Payne
Danny Demanto and Jana | Pin
Zombie and Roxie Cotton

Round Two
Bison Bravado and Mercedes Martinez | Pin
Nicky Oceans and Alexa Thatcher
Danny Demanto and Jana | Pin
Devon Moore and Luscious Latasha

Finals
Rhett Titus and Nikki Roxx | Pin
Bison Bravado and Mercedes Martinez / Danny Demanto and Jana

== 2009 ==
The winners of the 2009 King and Queen tournament were Jay Lethal and Miss April.

Round One
Vicious Vinny and Brooke Carter | Pin
Nicky Oceans and Autumn Breeze
Danny Demanto and Jana | Pin
Travis Blake and Jennifer Cruz
Jay Lethal and Miss April | Pin
Helter Skelter and Trixie Lynn
Bison Bravado and Annie Social | Pin
JD Smoothie and Roxie Cotton / Sean Hanson and Rick Cataldo

Round Two
Danny Demanto and Jana | Pin
Vicious Vinny and Brooke Carter
Jay Lethal and Miss April | Pin
Bison Bravado and Annie Social

Finals
Jay Lethal and Miss April | Pin
Danny Demanto and Jana

== 2010 ==
The winners of the 2010 King and Queen tournament were Devon Moore and Alicia.

Round One
Devon Moore and Alicia | Pin
Danny Demanto and Marti Belle
Nicky Oceans and Jana | Pin
Joey Janella and Niya
Balls Mahoney and Jazz | Pin
Bison Bravado and Amber O'Neal
Kevin Matthews and Nikki Roxx | Pin
JD Smoothie and Angel Orsini

Round Two
Devon Moore and Alicia | Pin
Nicky Oceans and Jana
Kevin Matthews and Nikki Roxx | Pin
Balls Mahoney and Jazz

Finals
Devon Moore and Alicia | Pin
Kevin Matthews and Nikki Roxx

== 2011 ==
The winners of the 2011 King and Queen tournament were Julio Dinero and Mercedes Martinez.

Round One
Frightmare and Jamilia Craft | Pin
JD Smooth and Sassy Stephanie
Nicky Oceans and Jennifer Cruz | Pin
Joey Janella and Jana
Kenny Dykstra and Cindy Rogers | Pin
Spyral and Ariel
Julio Dinero and Mercedes Martinez | Pin
Corey Havok and Nikky Syxx

Round Two
Nicky Oceans and Jennifer Cruz | Pin
Joey Janella and Jana
Julio Dinero and Mercedes Martinez | Pin
Kenny Dykstra and Cindy Rogers

Finals
Julio Dinero and Mercedes Martinez | Pin
Nicky Oceans and Jennifer Cruz

== 2012 ==
Round One
Jeff Cannonball and Jenny Rose | Pin
Nicky Oceans and Nicollette The Monkey
Austin Williams and Dixie McGuire | Pin
Jennifer Cruz and Mike Dennis
JD Smoothie and Rick Cataldo | Pin
Jack Spades and Tina San Antonio
Jana and Johnny Knockout | Pin
Nikki Syxx and Richard Michaels

Round Two
Jeff Cannonball and Jenny Rose | Pin
Jennifer Cruz and Mike Dennis
Jack Spades and Tina San Antonio | Pin
Jana and Johnny Knockout

Finals
Jennifer Cruz and Mike Dennis | Pin
Jana and Johnny Knockout

== 2013 ==
For 2013, WSU partnered up with Combat Zone Wrestling (CZW) instead of NWS for the newly renamed "Queen and King of the Ring Tournament".

Round One
Jake Crist and Nevaeh | Pin
Cherry Bomb and Pepper Parks
Devon Moore and Mickie Knuckles | Pin
Drew Gulak and Kimber Lee
A. R. Fox and Athena | Pin
Ezavel Suena and Latin Dragon
Addy Starr and Matt Tremont | Pin
Christina Von Eerie and Masada

Round Two
Jake Crist and Nevaeh | Pin
Drew Gulak and Kimber Lee
A. R. Fox and Athena | Pin
Addy Starr and Matt Tremont

Finals
Drew Gulak and Kimber Lee | Pin
A. R. Fox and Athena

== 2014 ==
The 2014 tournament was held on May 10.

Round One
Candice LeRae and Joey Ryan | Pin
J. T. Dunn and Shelly Martinez
Drew Gulak and Kimber Lee | Sub
Niya and Rick Catalado
Chris Dickinson and Shanna | Pin
D. J. Hyde and Sassy Stephie
Danny Havoc and Jewells Malone | Pin
Matt Tremont and Mickie Knuckles

Round Two
Candice LeRae and Joey Ryan | Pin
Drew Gulak and Kimber Lee
Chris Dickinson and Shanna | Pin
Matt Tremont and Mickie Knuckles

Finals
Candice LeRae and Joey Ryan | Pin
Matt Tremont and Mickie Knuckles

== 2017 ==
The 2017 tournament was held on September 11 and won by Su Yung and Blackwater.

Round One
Blackwater and Su Yung | Pin
Anthony Bennett and Willow Nightingale
Brandon Watts and Kiera Hogan | Pin
Ray Lyn and Tim Donst
Greg Excellent and Leva Bates | Pin
Dave Crist and Isla Dawn
Jason Cade and Veda Scott | Pin
Maxwell Jacob Feinstein and Rick Catalado

Round Two
Blackwater and Su Yung | Pin
Brandon Watts and Kiera Hogan
Greg Excellent and Leva Bates | Pin
Jason Cade and Veda Scott

Finals
Blackwater and Su Yung | Pin
Jason Cade and Veda Scott
