= Sassy Stephie =

American professional wrestler (born 1984)

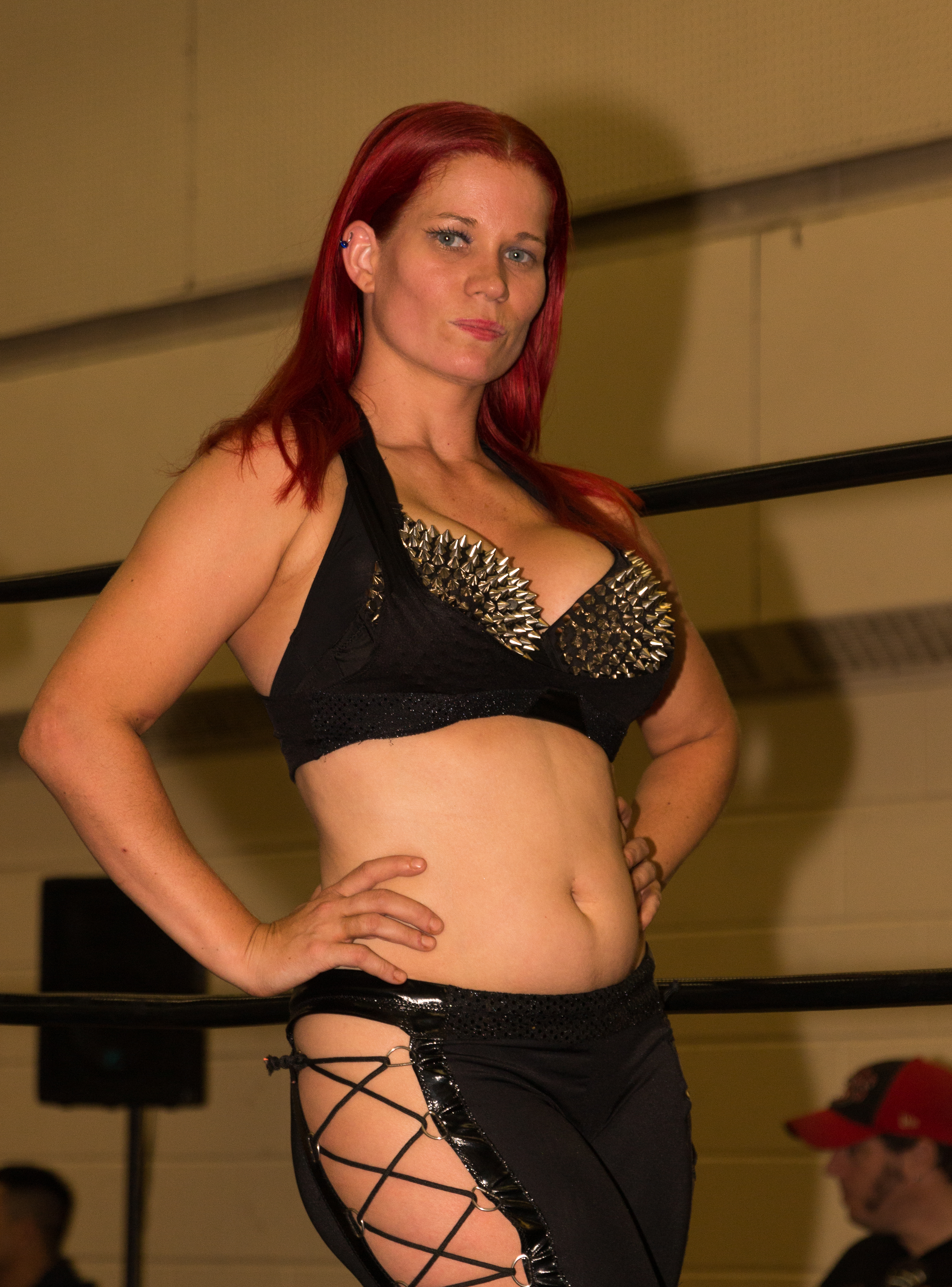
- Sassy Stephie in 2015

Personal information
- Born: Stephanie Sager; March 18, 1984 (age 42) Akron, Ohio, U.S.

Professional wrestling career
- Ring name(s): Brenda Jones; Sassy Stephanie; Sassy Stephie; Sassy Stephie Sinclair; Sassy Stephy
- Billed height: 5 ft 3 in (1.60 m)
- Billed weight: 116 lb (53 kg)
- Billed from: Akron, Ohio; Las Vegas, Nevada
- Trained by: Jeff Cannon
- Debut: March 10, 2007

Stephanie Sager (born March 18, 1984) is an American professional wrestler, better known by her ring names Sassy Stephie and Sassy Stephanie. She regularly performs for several independent promotions including Shimmer Women Athletes and Women Superstars Uncensored.

== Professional wrestling career ==
=== Training and early career (2005–2008) ===
Stephanie began her career as a ring announcer for a local professional wrestling promotion in Ohio, starting when the regular announcer was unavailable in August 2005. As Stephanie worked as a D. J. at a bowling alley, she was given the opportunity to announce the show and began the regular announcer. She later began training at Jeff Cannon's school. She made her professional wrestling debut for Ohio Championship Wrestling (OCW) in March 2007, as part of the promotion's first annual Ladies Night, and returned for Ladies Night Out 2 in March 2008.

=== Shimmer Women Athletes (2008–present) ===
Stephie debuted in Shimmer Women Athletes on October 19, 2008, losing to Rachel Summerlyn on Sparkle (Shimmer's pre-show). In May 2009, she returned to Sparkle, teaming with Kimberly Kash to lose to Summerlyn and Rayna Von Tash, before losing to Kash in a singles match. She earned her first victory in November, teaming with Kacey Diamond to defeat Kash and Leva. She and Diamond faced Nevaeh and Ashley Lane at the Volume 28 taping, but lost. She returned to Shimmer at the next tapings on April 10 and 11, 2010, losing to Madison Eagles and Jessie McKay. After a year-long absence, she returned to Shimmer on March 27, 2011, losing to LuFisto. At the October 1, 2011, tapings, Stephie formed a new partnership with the villainous Nevaeh. The duo defeated Nikki Roxx and Ariel on October 1, but lost to Regeneration X (Allison Danger and Leva Bates) the following night. They defeated Ashley Lane and Mia Yim at Volume 44. In March 2012, Stephie was back in singles action, losing to Courtney Rush and Athena, and lost to Hiroyo Matsumoto in October at Volume 49. She defeated Su Yung at the taping of Volume 50, before losing to Kalamity at Volume 52.

Stephie then re-joined forces with Nevaeh, alongside Mademoiselle Rachelle, and performed in tag team matches throughout 2013 and 2014. On October 20, 2013, at Volume 60, Stephie and Nevaeh unsuccessfully challenged 3G (Kellie Skater and Tomoka Nakagawa) for the Shimmer Tag Team Championship. She also competed in singles matches, accompanied by Rachelle as a manager, losing to Thunderkitty and Santana.

=== Women Superstars Uncensored (2009–2015) ===
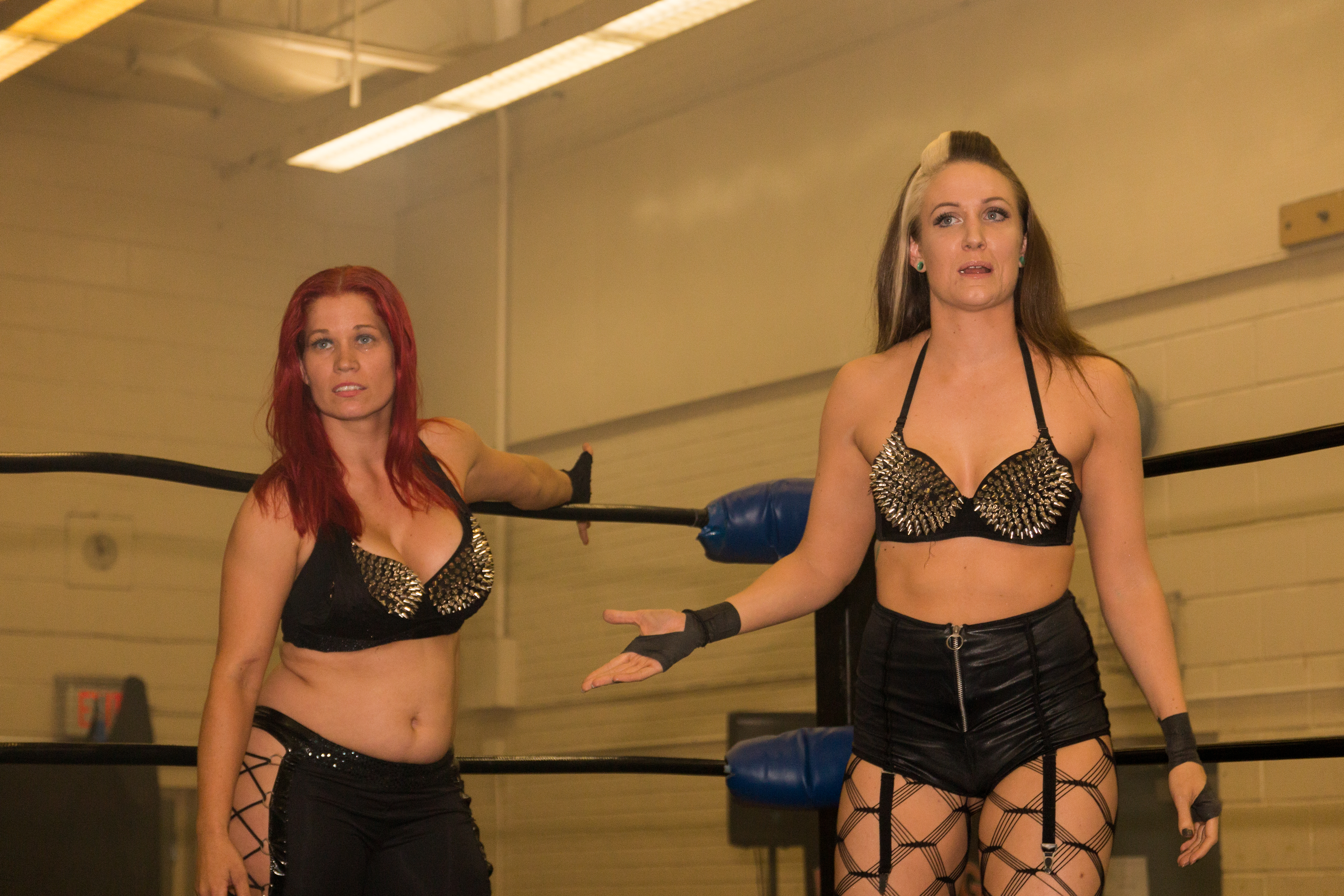
The Midwest Militia tag team - Sassy Stephie (left) and Allysin Kay in September 2015

Stephanie debuted for Women Superstars Uncensored (WSU) on October 3, 2009, in a loss to Amber O'Neal. After further losses to Cindy Rogers and Angelina Love, she unsuccessfully challenged Brittney Savage for the WSU Spirit Championship on November 6, 2010. She earned her first victory in WSU at the following show, when she defeated Brittnay Force. Following a tag team match where Stephanie and Savage were on opposite sides, Stephanie defeated Savage to win the WSU Spirit Championship on March 5, 2011, after an assist from Ivory. She competed in the 2011 J-Cup Tournament, defeating Jennifer Cruz and Jamilia Craft to reach the final, where she lost to Savage. She also competed in the WSU/NWS Queen and King of the Ring tournament, but she and J.D. Smooth were eliminated in the first round. Over the next few months, she successfully defended the Spirit Championship against Rain and O'Neal. On August 6, Stephanie joined forces with Allysin Kay and Jessicka Havok, to form The Midwest Militia. She lost the Spirit Championship to Rain on September 24. Stephie competed in tag team members with other members of The Midwest Militia over the next few months, including winning a War Games match against Team WSU (Mercedes Martinez, Alicia, and Brittney Savage) at the Breaking Barriers II internet pay-per-view in November. On March 3, 2012, Stephie and Kay won the WSU Tag Team Championship by defeating the Soul Sisters (Jana and Latasha). They successfully defended the championship against the teams of Alicia and Brittney Savage and the Soul Sisters in April.

As part of a talent exchange, The Midwest Militia began competing for the Canadian promotion NCW Femmes Fatales (NCWFF) in 2012. At NCWFF's ninth show in July 2012, the Midwest Militia defeated Courtney Rush, Xandra Bale, and Cat Power in a six-woman tag team match. At WSU's Queen and King Tournament pay-per-view, Stephie and Kay retained the championship against Marti Belle and Lexxus. On February 8, 2014, Stephie and Kay lost the WSU Tag Team Championship to Kimber Lee and Annie Social, when Havok, who was substituting for Kay, attacked Stephie during the match. In May, Stephie joined forces with D. J. Hyde to enter the King and Queen of the King tournament, but were eliminated in the first round by Shanna and Chris Dickinson. In November, Stephie announced she had become part of WSU management, and introduced an assistant, Amanda Rodriguez. The pair, along with Mademoiselle Rachelle, later attacked WSU Champion LuFisto.

=== Other independents (2007–present) ===
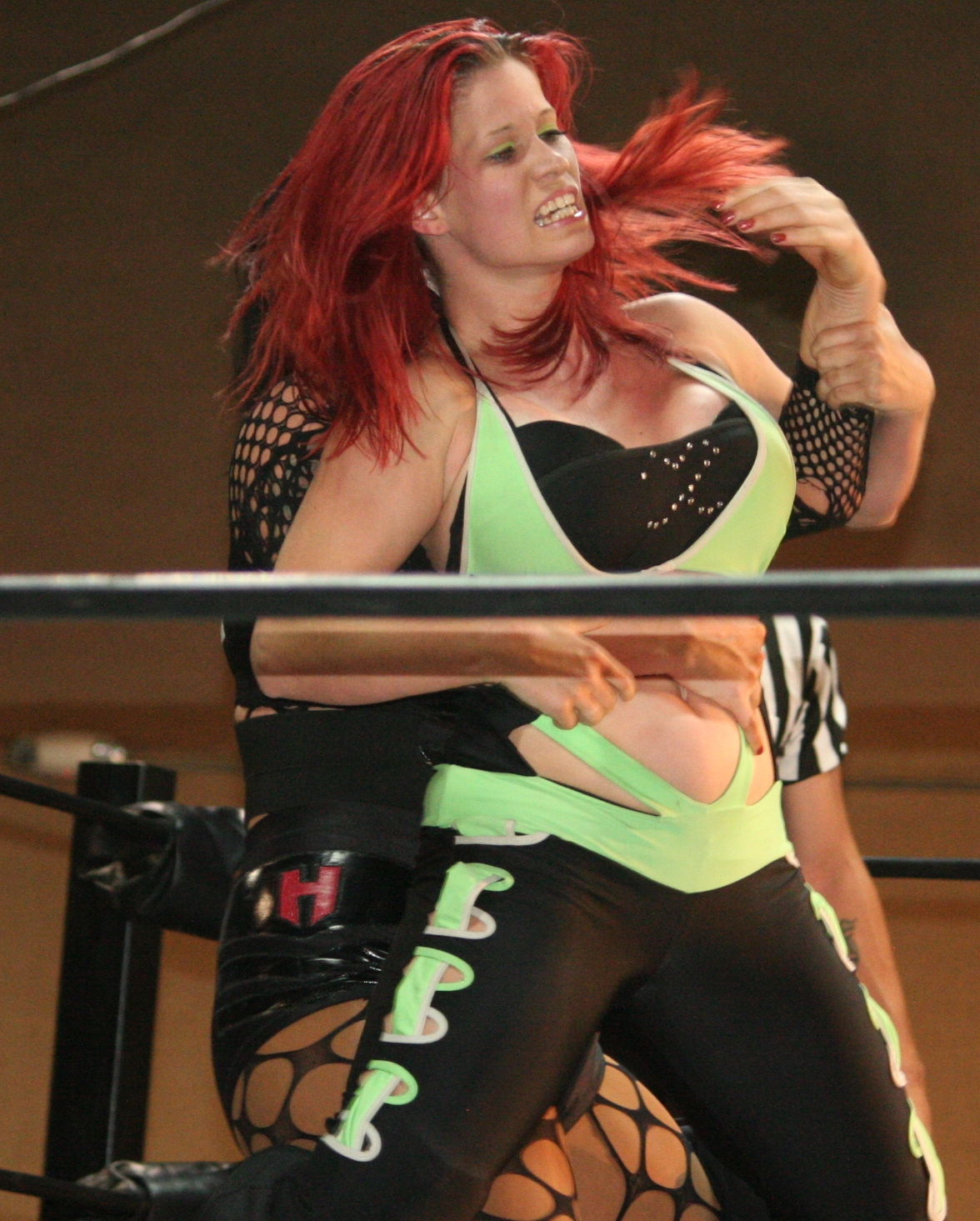
Sassy Stephie during a match in June 2014

Stephie has competed for many other independents, mainly in the Midwest. In 2007, she debuted for Ladysports in Tennessee. In 2008 and 2009, she worked a couple of shows for Ring of Honor, including a Ring of Honor Wrestling television taping on March 1, 2009. She has competed for Chikara in Philadelphia, and made her international debut in 2010, working for several promotions in the United Kingdom. Stephie competed on the first ever Jersey All Pro Wrestling Women's Division show in January 2009, where she lost to Roxie Cotton. She returned in November 2009 with a victory over Fate, and defeated Allison Danger at the next show in January 2010.

Stephie competes for Absolute Intense Wrestling, and has appeared on several of the Girls Night Out events. She has also appeared for the Queens of Combat promotion.

Upon debuting for Shine Wrestling in 2013, Stephie quickly formed an alliance with Jessie Belle Smothers, called Southern n' Sass. They feuded with The American Sweethearts (Santana and Amber O'Neal, and defeated them at Shine 15 to force the team to disband. The duo entered a tournament to determine the inaugural Shine Tag Team Champions; they defeated Mseerie (Christina Von Eerie and MsChif) to advance to the semi-finals, but lost to The Lucha Sisters (Leva Bates and Mia Yim). In March 2014, Stephie and Smothers were part of a four-way tag team match to determine the number one contenders to the Shine Tag Team Championship; the match was won by Legendary (Brandi Wine and Malia Hosaka).

== Other media ==
=== Podcasting ===
On September 24, 2020, Stephie began hosting her own podcast named Talkin' Sass, with Nevaeh being her first guest.

== Personal life ==
Stephie previously worked for UPS. She attended the Ohio Center for Broadcasting. She was part of the Fireball Run television series.

== Championships and accomplishments ==
- New Era Pro Wrestling
  - NEPW Women's Championship (1 time)
- Pro Wrestling Illustrated
  - Ranked No. 36 of the top 50 female wrestlers in the PWI Female 50 in 2013
- Pro Wrestling Rampage
  - PWR Women's Championship (1 time)
  - PWR Tag Team Championship (1 time) – with Angel Dust
- Remix Pro Wrestling
  - Remix Pro Fury Championship (Note: The title was called the Remix Pro Women's Championship during Stephie's first reign.) (2 times)
- Women Superstars Uncensored
  - WSU Spirit Championship (1 time)
  - WSU Tag Team Championship (1 time) – with Allysin Kay
- Wrestling All Star Promotions
  - WASP Women's Championship (1 time)
