= Hailey Hatred =

American retired professional wrestler

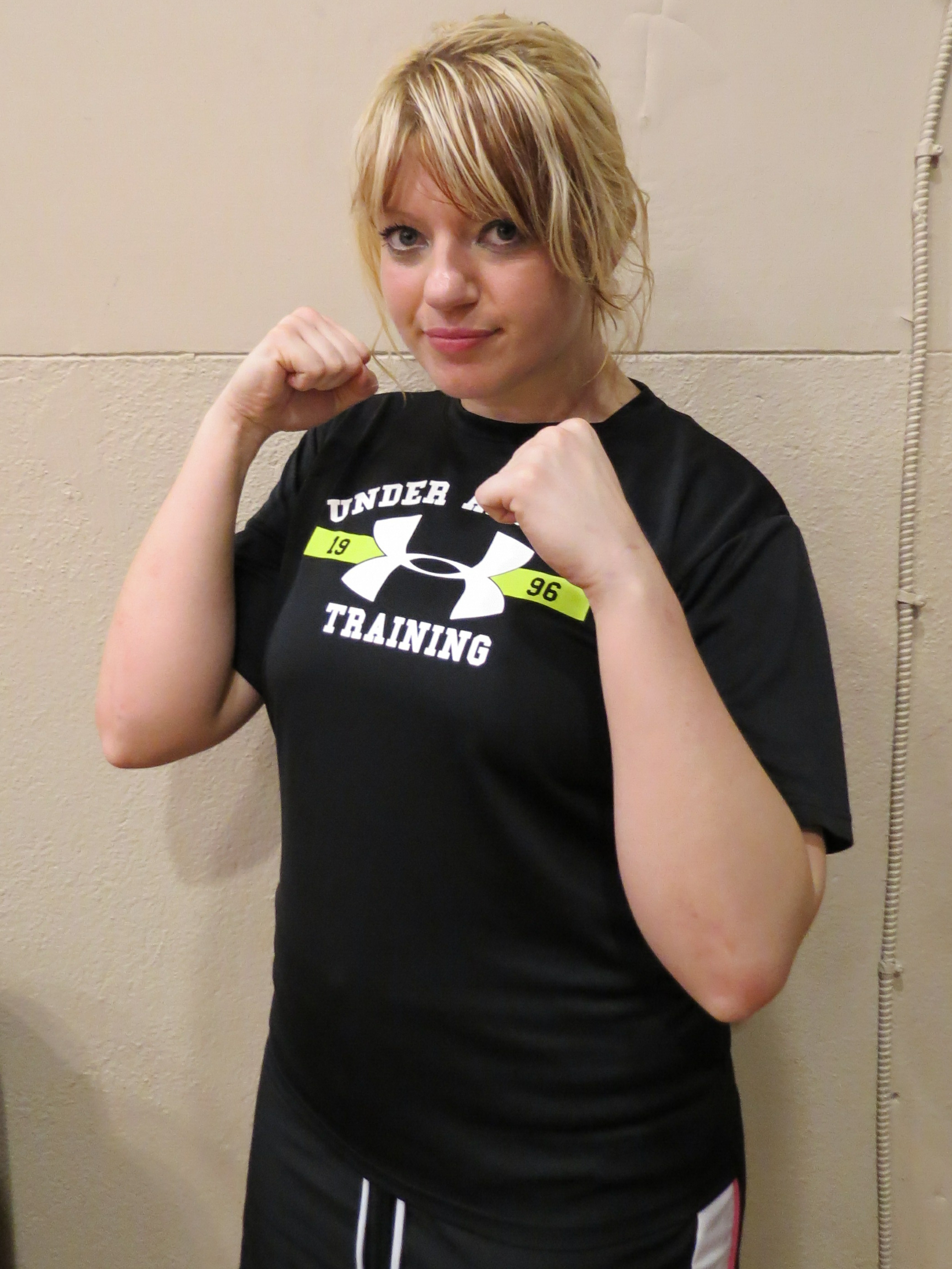
- Hatred in 2012

Personal information
- Born: Angel Katherine Reece; November 4, 1983 (age 42) Newark, Ohio, U.S.

Professional wrestling career
- Ring name(s): Bobbi Jablonski; Dark Unicorn; Hailey Hatred
- Billed height: 5 ft 10 in (1.78 m)
- Billed weight: 150 lb (68 kg)
- Trained by: Cody Hawk; Jimmy Yang; Matt Stryker; Race Steele
- Debut: November 2002
- Retired: August 3, 2013

Angel Katherine Reece (born November 4, 1983) is an American former professional wrestler, better known by the ring name Hailey Hatred. Originally debuting in July 2002, Hatred worked for several years for various promotions in both the United States and Mexico, before moving to Japan in late 2010. In 2011, Hatred made her breakthrough to the top of Japanese joshi puroresu with the JWP Joshi Puroresu promotion, holding the Daily Sports Women's Tag Team, IMW Hybrid Fighting, JWP Openweight, JWP Tag Team, TLW World Women's and TLW World Women's Tag Team Championships simultaneously. During 2012, Hatred began working more regularly for Ice Ribbon and in November 2012 once again held six different titles; the IMW Hybrid Fighting Championship, the International Ribbon Tag Team Championship, the Reina World Tag Team Championship, the Remix Pro Women's Championship, the TLW World Women's Championship and the Triangle Ribbon Championship. Reece has been inactive from professional wrestling ever since leaving Japan in August 2015.

== Professional wrestling career ==
=== United States (2002–2012) ===
Reece was trained at Heartland Wrestling Association's (HWA) wrestling school and made her professional wrestling debut in July 2002 under the ring name Bobbi Jablonski. After branching out to other Midwestern independent promotions like Cleveland All-Pro Wrestling, Far North Wrestling, Independent Wrestling Association Mid-South, Midwest Regional Wrestling and Totally Lethal Wrestling, Reece changed her ring name to Hailey Hatred. Hatred won her first title on June 6, 2004, when she became the inaugural Totally Lethal Wrestling (TLW) World Women's Champion. Though TLW went out of business later that year, Hatred held the TLW World Women's Championship for 3,345 days. On October 29, 2004, Hatred took part in the inaugural ChickFight tournament, losing to Nikki Roxx in the first round. She has since returned to take part in the ChickFight III, IV and VI tournaments, each time losing her opening match in the tournament. On November 18, 2005, Hatred defeated Mickie Knuckles to win the IWA Mid-South Women's Championship. She would lose the title back to Knuckles on February 8, 2006. On May 15, 2009, Hatred defeated Sammi Lane in the finals of a tournament to win the vacant Absolute Intense Wrestling (AIW) Women's Championship. After a thirteen-month reign, Hatred was stripped of the title on June 27, 2010, when she no-showed a title defense against Jefferson Saint.

On June 6, 2009, Hatred began working for Women Superstars Uncensored (WSU), where she formed the tag team "Havok & Hatred" with Jessicka Havok. In their first WSU match, Hatred and Havok unsuccessfully challenged Alicia and Brooke Carter for the WSU Tag Team Championship. On August 22, Hatred and Havok defeated Alicia and Carter in a rematch to become the new WSU Tag Team Champions. Hatred and Havok dominated the WSU tag team division for the following months, building up to a title match on October 3, where they retained the title against Angel Orsini and Mercedes Martinez, following interference from their new ally Rain. On November 7, Hatred and Havok faced Orsini and Martinez in a rematch, where any outside interference would result in a one-year suspension from WSU. Hatred and Havok lost the WSU Tag Team Championship, when Orsini pinned Havok for the win. Hatred has not returned to WSU since.

On May 9, 2009, Hatred made her debut for Jersey All Pro Wrestling (JAPW), taking part in a battle royal, where she was the last competitor pinned by the winner, Sara Del Rey. Hatred returned to the promotion on September 12 to unsuccessfully challenge Del Rey for the JAPW Women's Championship. On November 14, Hatred was defeated by Cheerleader Melissa and, later that same day, interfered in a match between her and Del Rey, costing Melissa the JAPW Women's Championship. This led to a match on January 9, 2010, where Del Rey defeated Hatred and Melissa in a three-way match. Hatred's to date final JAPW appearance took place on March 20, 2010, when she unsuccessfully challenged Del Rey for the JAPW Women's Championship in a Street Fight, which received rave reviews from those in attendance.

On October 1, 2011, Hatred made her debut for Shimmer Women Athletes, defeating Kalamity on Volume 41. Later that same day, Hatred teamed with Kalamity in a losing effort against the team of Melanie Cruise and Mena Libra on Volume 42. Hatred returned to Shimmer on March 17, 2012, when she and Kalamity defeated Kana and LuFisto in a tag team match on Volume 45. Later that same day on Volume 46, Hatred and Kalamity unsuccessfully challenged Ayako Hamada and Ayumi Kurihara for the Shimmer Tag Team Championship. The following day on Volume 47, Hatred was defeated by Mercedes Martinez in a singles match. Later that day on Volume 48, Hatred and Kalamity were defeated by Christina Von Eerie and MsChif in a tag team match.

=== Mexico (2008–2010) ===
In 2008, Reece began working on the Mexican independent circuit, most notably for the Lucha Libre Femenil (LLF) promotion, where she performed under a mask and the ring name Dark Unicorn. Her first accomplishment in Mexico took place on July 18, when she won the 2008 Copa LLF. The following June, Dark Unicorn successfully defended the title by also winning the 2009 Copa LLF. On December 4, 2009, Dark Unicorn won her first Lucha de Apuestas Mask vs. Mask match, when she defeated La Novia de Jason in a three-way match, which also included Princesa Sujei. On May 28, 2010, Dark Unicorn herself was unmasked, when she lost a Lucha de Apuestas to Angélica. On June 27, Reece, without her mask and using the ring name Hailey Hatred, made an appearance for Lucha Libre AAA World Wide (AAA), teaming with El Brazo to defeat Jesse and Tiffany in a mixed tag team match. During her time in Mexico, Hatred also won the IMW Hybrid Fighting Championship.

=== Japan (2007, 2010–2013) ===
In July 2007, Hatred made her first trip to Japan, working for the JWP Joshi Puroresu promotion on a two-month-long tour.

On July 25, 2010, Hatred returned to Japan, wrestling at a NEO Japan Ladies Pro Wrestling event, where she defeated Basara. On September 26, Hatred returned to JWP and began working regularly for the promotion. On October 10, Hatred put her AIW Women's Championship on the line in a title vs. title match against JWP Openweight Champion Kaori Yoneyama. After the first match ended in a double knockout, Hatred and Yoneyama wrestled another match, which also ended in a double knockout, meaning that both champions kept their titles. On November 30, Hatred and Yoneyama defeated Cherry Bomb and Sexy Star at a Joshi 4 Hope event to become the inaugural TLW World Women's Tag Team Champions. On December 23, Hatred won the Christmas Cup battle royal to earn a future shot at the Daily Sports Women's Tag Team Championship. At the end of the year, Hatred was awarded the Enemy Award, an annual prize handed to the top "outside" wrestler in JWP. On January 16, 2011, Hatred entered the Tag League the Best tournament, teaming with Kaori Yoneyama as Queens Revolution. In their first match in the tournament, Hatred and Yoneyama unsuccessfully challenged Kayoko Haruyama and Tsubasa Kuragaki for the Daily Sports Women's Tag Team Championship. Despite winning their two remaining matches in the round robin stage of the tournament, Hatred and Yoneyama failed to advance from their block. On April 3, Hatred teamed with Aja Kong to unsuccessfully challenge Haruyama and Kuragaki for not only the Daily Sports Women's Tag Team Championship, but also the JWP Tag Team Championship.

On April 17, Hatred entered the 2011 J-1 Grand Prix tournament. After defeating Tsubasa Kuragaki and Kayoko Haruyama in the first two rounds, Hatred advanced to the semifinals of the tournament on June 12, where she successfully defended the TLW World Women's Championship against Sachie Abe. On June 26, Hatred defeated Leon to not only win the 2011 G-1 Grand Prix, but also to retain the TLW World Women's and IMW Hybrid Fighting Championships and become the new holder of the JWP Openweight Championship, the promotion's top title. In winning the title, Hatred became the first American to hold the oldest championship in all of joshi puroresu. On August 7, Hatred successfully defended her Triple Crown against her Queens Revolution partner Kaori Yoneyama, who had just prior to the match announced her retirement from professional wrestling at the end of the year. This was followed by another successful defense on September 23, against Tsubasa Kuragaki. On November 13, Hatred and Yoneyama defeated Kayoko Haruyama and Tsubasa Kuragaki to retain the TLW World Women's Tag Team Championship and win the Daily Sports Women's and JWP Tag Team Championships, meaning that Hatred now held six championships simultaneously, three in both singles and tag team divisions. On December 23 at JWP's final event of 2011, Hatred lost the JWP Openweight Championship to Tsubasa Kuragaki. The same night was also supposed to feature Yoneyama's retirement match, however, after the match she announced that she had changed her mind and would continue her career. The surprise turn led to JWP stripping Queens Revolution of all three of their tag team championships as punishment. The year ended with Hatred being given her second Enemy Award in a row. On January 15, 2012, Hatred unsuccessfully challenged Ayumi Kurihara for Mexican promotion Consejo Mundial de Lucha Libre's (CMLL) World Women's Championship at a Universal Woman's Pro Wrestling Reina event in Tokyo. In late 2011, Hatred also began making semi-regular appearances for the Ice Ribbon promotion, which led to her teaming with Dorami Nagano to unsuccessfully challenge Hikaru Shida and Maki Narumiya for the International Ribbon Tag Team Championship on January 25, 2012.

After spending half a year working back in the United States, Hatred returned to Japan on August 7. She made her return to Ice Ribbon four days later, teaming with Miyako Matsumoto in a tag team match, where they were defeated by Aki Shizuku and Hiroyo Matsumoto. On August 19, Hatred returned to JWP, teaming with Manami Katsu and Tsubasa Kuragaki in a six-woman tag team match, where they were defeated by Leon, Manami Toyota and Ray. On September 23 at Ribbon no Kishitachi 2012, Hatred defeated Neko Nitta and Shuu Shibutani in a three-way match to win the Triangle Ribbon Championship, her first title in Ice Ribbon. Hatred made her first successful title defense just six days later, defeating Aki Shizuku and Hamuko Hoshi. On September 30, Hatred made her debut for World Wonder Ring Stardom, when she was revealed as the first member of Kyoko Kimura's Kimura Monster-gun stable. Hatred made her in-ring debut for Stardom three days later, defeating Saki Kashima. On October 7, Hatred main evented the Joshi 4 Hope IV, event, successfully defending the Remix Pro Women's Championship against MsChif. On October 13, Hatred picked up her arguably biggest win in Ice Ribbon, when she defeated former ICE×60 Champion Hikaru Shida in a singles match. On October 28 at 2012 Yokohama Ribbon III, Hatred defeated Shida and Aki Shizuku via disqualification, after Shida used a shinai on her, to make her second successful defense of the Triangle Ribbon Championship. On November 28, Hatred and Hamuko Hoshi defeated Shida and Tsukasa Fujimoto to win the International Ribbon Tag Team Championship and the Reina World Tag Team Championship, the latter title owned by the Reina X World promotion. As a result, Hatred once again held six titles simultaneously. However, Hatred's and Hoshi's double reign lasted only 21 days as they lost both titles to the team of Kyoko Kimura and Sayaka Obihiro on December 19. On December 27, Hatred made her debut for Wrestling New Classic (WNC), teaming with Josh O'Brien and Lin Byron in a six-person tag team match, where they were defeated by Akebono, Makoto and Takuya Kito. On January 5, 2013, Hatred was stripped of the Triangle Ribbon Championship, when her third title defense against Makoto Oishi and Tsukasa Fujimoto ended in a fifteen-minute time limit draw.

On January 10, Hatred made her debut for World Woman Pro-Wrestling Diana, when she and fellow American Jenny Rose entered a tournament to determine the inaugural Diana Tag Team Champions, from which they were eliminated in the first round by Keiko Aono and Mask de Sun. On January 26, Hatred failed in her attempt to recapture the Triangle Ribbon Championship, when she was eliminated from a tournament for the vacant title by Miyako Matsumoto in a three-way match, which also included Gabai-Ji-chan. The following day, Hatred made her second successful defense of the Remix Pro Women's Championship by defeating Tsubasa Kuragaki at a JWP event. On March 17, Hatred and Kyoko Kimura defeated Kawasaki Katsushika Saikyou Densetsu (Natsuki☆Taiyo and Yoshiko) to win the Goddesses of Stardom Championship. Hatred and Kimura lost the title to Ho-Show Tennyo (Kairi Hojo and Natsumi Showzuki) in their first defense on April 29 at Ryōgoku Cinderella, with Hatred suffering her first pinfall loss in Stardom in the process. On May 5, Hatred and Aki Shizuku produced their own independent event, titled Queen Bee 1st, in Itabashi, Tokyo, which saw the two defeat Command Bolshoi and Rabbit Miu in the main event to become the new TLW World Women's Tag Team Champions. On June 23, Hatred, along with Kimura Monster-gun stablemates Christina Von Eerie and Kyoko Kimura, was given an opportunity to become the new Artist of Stardom Champion, however, the three were defeated in a decision match for the vacant title by Kairi Hojo, Kaori Yoneyama and Yuhi. Shortly afterwards, Hatred announced that she was leaving Japan and returning to the United States for the foreseeable future, which led to Ice Ribbon dedicating the August 3 event to her. The main event of the show featured Hatred's final match in Japan, where she and Hikaru Shida were defeated by Hamuko Hoshi and Tsukasa Fujimoto, with Hoshi pinning her for the win.

== Personal life ==
In 2011, Reece stated that she was training for a debut in mixed martial arts. As of 2014, Reece converted to Islam. As of 2023, Reece's whereabouts are unknown.

== Championships and accomplishments ==
- Absolute Intense Wrestling
  - AIW Women's Championship (1 time)
  - AIW Women's Championship Tournament (2009)
- Ice Ribbon
  - International Ribbon Tag Team Championship (1 time) – with Hamuko Hoshi
  - Triangle Ribbon Championship (1 time)
- Independent Wrestling Association Mid-South
  - IWA Mid-South Women's Championship (1 time)
- JWP Joshi Puroresu
  - Daily Sports Women's Tag Team Championship (1 time) – with Kaori Yoneyama
  - JWP Openweight Championship (1 time)
  - JWP Tag Team Championship (1 time) – with Kaori Yoneyama
  - Christmas Cup (2010)
  - J-1 Grand Prix (2011)
  - JWP Year-End Award (2 times)
    - Enemy Award (2010, 2011)
- Lucha Libre Femenil
  - Copa LLF (2008, 2009)
- Pro Wrestling Illustrated
  - Ranked No. 11 of the top 50 female wrestlers in the PWI Female 50 in 2012
- Reina X World
  - Reina World Tag Team Championship (1 time) – with Hamuko Hoshi
- Remix Pro Wrestling
  - Remix Pro Women's Championship (1 time)
- Totally Lethal Wrestling
  - TLW World Women's Championship (1 time)
- Women Superstars Uncensored
  - WSU Tag Team Championship (1 time) – with Jessicka Havok
- World Wonder Ring Stardom
  - Goddesses of Stardom Championship (1 time) – with Kyoko Kimura
- World Wrestling Coalition
  - WWC Women's Championship (1 time)
- Other titles
  - IMW Hybrid Fighting Championship (1 time)
  - TLW World Women's Tag Team Championship (2 times) – with Kaori Yoneyama (1) and Aki Shizuku (1)

=== Luchas de Apuestas record ===
Winner (wager)	Loser (wager)	Location	Event	Date	Notes
Dark Unicorn (mask)	La Novia de Jason (mask)	Monterrey, Nuevo León, Mexico	Live event	December 4, 2009	(Note: This was a three-way match, also involving Princesa Sujei.)
Angélica (mask)	Dark Unicorn (mask)	Monterrey, Nuevo León, Mexico	Torneo de la Muerte	May 28, 2010	(Note: Finals of an eight-woman "Losers Advance" tournament.)
