= J-Cup Tournament =

- Promotions: National Wrestling Superstars (2006–2010); Women Superstars Uncensored (2008–2013)
- First event: 2006
- Last event: 2013
- Event gimmick: Single elimination tournament for female wrestlers

The J-Cup Tournament is an annual tournament held by Women Superstars Uncensored, in which the winner earns of shot at the WSU Championship. The inaugural tournament was hosted by National Wrestling Superstars in 2006 as an extension of the Jersey J-Cup, which NWS dubbed the Chris Candido Memorial J-Cup Tournament. In 2008, NWS co-hosted the second tournament in collaboration with WSU as the J-Cup Tournament. Both promotions co-promoted the tournament until 2010, after which it became exclusive to WSU. The promotion held the tournament until 2013, the last edition being named the International J-Cup.

== 2008 ==
The tournament was held on March 22, 2008.

Round One
Mercedes Martinez	Pin
Princess Jana
Becky Bayless	Pin
Dawn Marie
Angel Orsini	Pin
Annie Social
Rebecca Payne	Pin
Luscious Latasha

Round Two
Becky Bayless
Mercedes Martinez	Pin
Angel Orsini	Pin
Rebecca Payne

Finals
Mercedes Martinez	Pin
Angel Orsini

== 2009 ==
The 2009 tournament took place on April 10, 2009 in Bergenfield, New Jersey.

Round One
Rain	Pin
Brooke Carter
Miss April	Pin
Roxie Cotton
Trixie Lynn	Pin
Jennifer Cruz
Angel Orsini	Pin
Annie Social

Round Two
Miss April
Rain	Pin
Angel Orsini	Pin
Trixie Lynn

Finals
Rain
Angel Orsini	Pin

== 2010 ==
National Wrestling Superstars teamed up with its sister all-ladies promotion Women Superstars Uncensored on April 2 for the 2010 Jersey J-Cup Women’s Tournament in Neptune, New Jersey.

Round One
Brittney Savage	Pin
Marti Belle
Alicia	Pin
Tina San Antonio
Jazz	Pin
Jana
Angel Orsini	Pin
Nikki Roxx

Round Two
Brittney Savage
Alicia	Pin
Angel Orsini	Pin
Jazz

Finals
Alicia	Pin
Angel Orsini

== 2011 ==
The 2011 J-Cup Tournament was held on April 2, 2011. In the final the former WSU Spirit Champion Brittney Savage defeat the current Spirit Champion Sassy Stephie, to earn a shot at WSU Champion Mercedes Martinez. Brittney will challenge Mercedes Martinez for the WSU Championship on June 25, 2011.

Round One
Jana	Pin
Marti Belle
Brittney Savage	Pin
Cindy Rogers
Jamilia Craft	Pin
Tina San Antonio
Sassy Stephanie	Pin
Jennifer Cruz

Round Two
Jana
Brittney Savage	Pin
Sassy Stephanie	Pin
Jamilia Craft

Finals
Brittney Savage	Pin
Sassy Stephanie

== 2012 ==
The 2012 J-Cup Tournament was held on April 28, 2012. Two qualifying matches were held at the 5th Anniversary Show on March 3, 2012, which saw Athena defeat Leva Bates, and April Hunter defeat Annie Social. However, due to injury, Hunter had to pull out of the tournament, and Social took her place. Christina von Eerie was also due to take part in the tournament, but travel issues meant that she was replaced by Kimber Lee.

Round One
Annie Social	Submission
Nikki Syxx
Brittney Savage	Pin
Ezavel Suena
Athena	Pin
Kimber Lee
Alicia	Double
Lexxus	Count Out

Round Two
Annie Social
Brittney Savage	Pin
Athena	Bye

Finals
Brittney Savage	Pin
Athena

== 2013 ==
The 2013 J-Cup Tournament was held on October 12, 2013 at WSU's second Secret Show in Vorhees, New Jersey.

Round One
Barbi Hayden	Pin
Kimber Lee
Nikki Storm	Pin
Jodi D'Milo
Jewells Malone	Pin
Jenny Rose
Shanna	Pin
Santana Garrett

Round Two
Barbi Hayden
Nikki Storm	Pin
Shanna	Pin
Jewells Malone

Finals
Nikki Storm
Shanna	Pin

== See also ==
- British J-Cup
- Jersey J-Cup
- Super J-Cup
