= WSU Tag Team Championship =

Professional wrestling women's tag team championship

Details
- Promotion: Women Superstars United
- Date established: October 11, 2008
- Date retired: 2020
Statistics
- First champions: The Beatdown Betties (Roxie Cotton and Annie Social)
- Final champions: Ruthless Lala and Su Yung
- Most reigns: The Beatdown Betties (Roxie Cotton and Annie Social) (2 reigns)
- Longest reign: Ruthless Lala and Su Yung 1770+(?) days (1st reign)
- Shortest reign: Amy Lee and Taylor Wilde (<1 day)

The WSU Tag Team Championship was a professional wrestling tag team championship in Women Superstars United (WSU). It is competed for in Women Superstars United, and has been defended on shows of sister promotion National Wrestling Superstars. Championship reigns are determined by professional wrestling matches, in which competitors are involved in scripted rivalries. These narratives create feuds between the various competitors, which cast them as villains and heroines.

== Title history ==
Key
No.	Overall reign number
Reign	Reign number for the specific team—reign numbers for the individuals are in parentheses, if different
Days	Number of days held
Defenses	Number of successful defenses
+	Current reign is changing daily

No.	Champion	Championship change			Reign statistics			Notes	Ref.
No.	Champion	Date	Event	Location	Reign	Days	Defenses	Notes	Ref.
Women Superstars United (WSU)
1	The Beatdown Betties (Annie Social and Roxie Cotton)	October 11, 2008	Payback's a Bitch	Boonton, NJ	1	91	2	Defeated Amy Lee and Missy Sampson in the finals of an eight–team tournament to become the inaugural champions.	
2	Amy Lee and Taylor Wilde	January 10, 2009	live event	Boonton, NJ	1	<1	0		
3	The Beatdown Betties (Annie Social, Rick Cataldo and Roxie Cotton)	January 10, 2009	live event	Boonton, NJ	2	28	1	This was a four-corners tag team elimination match, also involving Lea Morrison and Kylie Pierce and Team Wigwam (Alere Little Feather and Missy Sampson). Cataldo was also recognized as champion under the Freebird Rule.	
4	The AC Express (Brooke Carter and Miss April	February 7, 2009	National Wrestling Superstars	Edison, NJ	1	87	1		
5	Alicia and Brooke Carter (2)	May 5, 2009	Uncensored Rumble II	Boonton, NJ	1	77	1	WSU allowed Carter to choose a replacement, after Miss April was signed to World Wrestling Entertainment.	
6	Hailey Hatred and Jessicka Havok	August 22, 2009	As the World Turns	Boonton, NJ	1	77	2		
7	Angel Orsini and Mercedes Martinez	November 7, 2009	ACE Rise 2 Power	Union City, NJ	1	161	0		
8	The Cosmo Club (Cindy Rogers and Jana)	April 17, 2010	NYWC April Reign	Port Jefferson Station, NY	1	203	1		
9	The Belle Saints (Marti Belle and Tina San Antonio) and Jazz	November 6, 2010	Breaking Barriers	Union City, NJ	1	202	5 (Note: Marti Belle and Tina San Antonio successfully defended the championship four times, while Belle and Jazz successfully defended the championship one time)	During their reign, WSU Announced that Antonio was injured. Jazz replaced Antonio and was recognized as champion under the Freebird Rule.	
10	The Boston Shore (Amber and Lexxus)	May 27, 2011	PWS Refuse To Lose II	Queens, NY	1	281	3	During their reign, Amber decided to quit pro wrestling due to personal demands and issues. WSU decided to leave Lexxus as the co-champion until she finds herself a new partner.	
11	The Soul Sisters (Jana (2) and Latasha)	March 3, 2012	5th Anniversary Show	Deer Park, NY	1	<1	0	Jana and Latasha defeated Lexxus and Tina San Antonio, who were the replacement of Amber, to win the championship.	
12	The Midwest Militia (Allysin Kay and Sassy Stephie)	March 3, 2012	5th Anniversary Show	Deer Park, NY	1	707	2		
13	Chicks Using Nasty Tactics (Annie Social (3) and Kimber Lee)	February 8, 2014	Mutiny	Voorhees, NJ	1	154	2	Jessicka Havok substituted for Allysin Kay.	
14	The Juicy Product (David Starr and J. T. Dunn)	July 12, 2014	United	Voorhees, NJ	1	224	1	With the win, the two became the first male tag team wrestlers to hold the championship.	
15	Chicks Using Nasty Tactics (Annie Social (4) and Kimber Lee (2))	February 21, 2015	8th Anniversary Show	Voorhees, NJ	2	357	3		
16	The Fella Twins (Eddy McQueen and Rick Cataldo (2))	February 13, 2016	9th Anniversary Show	Voorhees, NJ	1	455	5	The Fella Twins defeated Annie Social and Gabby Gilbert, who were the replacement of Kimber Lee	
17	Ruthless Ambition (Maria Manic and Penelope Ford)	May 13, 2017	Battle Tested	Voorhees, NJ	1	679	1 (Note: Ruthless Ambition have one successful championship defense, as a random fan (Boom Harden) was chosen by Manic to replace Penelope Ford in a defense against The Shook Crew at WSU Breaking Barriers V on June 16th, 2018)	Maria Manic won championships in handicap match, as Ford was injured.	
—	Vacated	March 23, 2019	Something Entirely New	Voorhees, NJ	—	—	—	Maria Manic declared that she should be WSU World Champion and vacated the championship.	
18	The Platinum Hunnies (Angel Sinclair and Ava Everett)	April 26, 2019	Thank You For Being a Friend	Voorhees, NJ	1	99	2	Defeated The Endless (Davienne and Megan Mason) and Rainbow Bright (Gabby Gilbert and Luscious Latasha) in a tournament final three-way Tag team match.	
19	Delmi Exo and Kasey Catal	August 3, 2019	Summer, Kind of Wonderful	Voorhees, NJ	1	147	1	Catal and Exo defeated All That (Ava Everett and Candy Cartwright). As a trial member of the Platinum Hunnies, Cartwright defended the titles under the Freebird Rule, but was not recognized by WSU as Tag Team Champion.	
20	Ruthless Lala and Su Yung	December 28, 2019	No Glasses Required: We Have 2020 Vision	Voorhees, NJ	1	N/A N/A, 2020	0		
—	Deactivated	N/A N/A, 2020	—	—	—	—	—	The title deactivated when the company deactivated in 2020.	

== Combined reigns ==
As of March 4, 2026

=== By team ===
†	Indicates the current champion

Rank	Team	No. of reigns	Combined defenses	Combined days
1	Ruthless Lala and Su Yung	1	0	N/A
2	The Midwest Militia (Allysin Kay and Sassy Stephie)	1	2	707
3	Ruthless Ambition (Maria Manic and Penelope Ford)	1	1	679
4	Chicks Using Nasty Tactics (Annie Social and Kimber Lee)	2	3	511
5	The Fella Twins (Eddy McQueen and Rick Cataldo)	1	5	455
6	The Boston Shore (Amber and Lexxus)	1	3	281
7	The Juicy Product (David Starr and J. T. Dunn)	1	1	224
8	The Cosmo Club (Cindy Rogers and Jana)	1	1	203
9	The Belle Saints (Marti Belle and Tina San Antonio) and Jazz	1	5	202
10	Angel Orsini and Mercedes Martinez	1	0	161
11	Delmi Exo and Kasey Catal	1	1	147
12	The Beatdown Betties (Annie Social and Roxie Cotton)	2	3	119
13	The Platinum Hunnies (Ava Everett and Angel Sinclair)	1	1	99
14	The AC Express (Miss April and Brooke Carter)	1	1	87
15	Alicia and Brittney Savage	1	1	77
15	Hailey Hatred and Jessicka Havok	1	2	77
17	Amy Lee and Taylor Wilde	1	1	<1
17	The Soul Sisters (Jana and Latasha)	1	0	<1

=== By wrestler ===
Rank	Wrestler	No. of reigns	Combined defenses	Combined days
1	Ruthless Lala	1	0	N/A
1	Su Yung	1	0	N/A
3	Allysin Kay	1	2	707
3	Sassy Stephie	1	2	707
5	Penelope Ford	1	1	679
5	Maria Manic	1	1	679
5	Annie Social	4	8	630
8	Kimber Lee	2	3	511
9	Rick Cataldo	2	6	483
10	Eddy McQueen	1	5	455
11	Amber	1	3	281
11	Lexxus	1	3	281
13	David Starr	1	1	224
13	J. T. Dunn	1	1	224
15	Cindy Rogers	1	1	203
15	Jana	2	1	203
17	Jazz	1	1	202
17	Marti Belle	1	4	202
17	Tina San Antonio	1	4	202
20	Brooke Carter	2	2	164
21	Angel Orsini	1	0	161
21	Mercedes Martinez	1	0	161
23	Delmi Exo	1	1	147
23	Kasey Catal	1	1	147
25	Roxie Cotton	2	3	119
26	Ava Everett	1	1	99
26	Angel Sinclair	1	1	99
28	Miss April	1	1	87
29	Alicia	1	1	77
29	Jessicka Havok	1	2	77
29	Hailey Hatred	1	2	77
32	Amy Lee	1	1	<1
32	Latasha	1	0	<1
32	Taylor Wilde	1	1	<1
