= Brittney Savage =

American professional wrestler

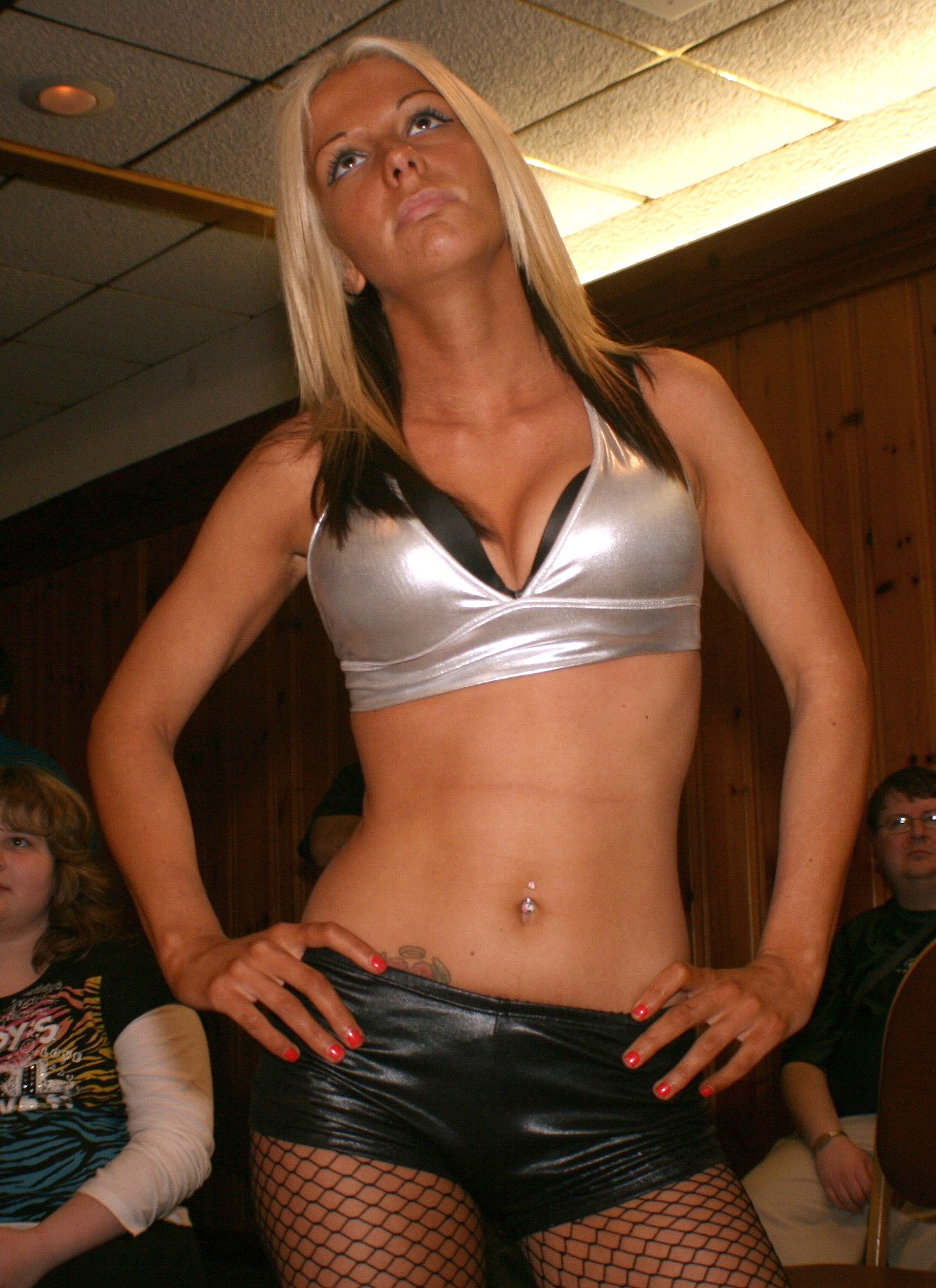
- Savage in 2010

Personal information
- Born: April 29, 1987 (age 39) Bay Ridge, Brooklyn, New York, U.S.
- Children: 1

Professional wrestling career
- Ring name(s): Brittney Savage; Brooke Carter; Brittany Carter
- Billed height: 5 ft 4 in (1.63 m)
- Billed weight: 116 lb (53 kg; 8.3 st)
- Billed from: Long Island, New York
- Debut: November 29, 2008

Brittney Savage (born April 29, 1987) is an American professional wrestler. She is best known for her time with wrestling promotions such as American Championship Entertainment, National Wrestling Superstars, World Xtreme Wrestling and Women Superstars Uncensored.

== Professional wrestling career ==
Savage became a wrestling fan, when she was in Junior High and later she began training. She made her debut in November, 2008. In December, 2008 Savage made her debut for American Championship Entertainment as the manager of Danny DeManto. Brittney Savage debuted for Wild Samoan Afa's World Xtreme Wrestling as Brooke Carter and in her debut match, she defeated Jana.

=== Women Superstars Uncensored (2009–2013) ===
Savage made her debut for Women Superstars Uncensored (WSU) under the name Brooke Carter, teaming up with Reyna Fire against Melissa Coates and Trixxie Lynn, in a losing effort. In WSU Carter formed a tag-team with Miss April, known as The AC Express. On February 7, 2009, The AC Express defeated The Beatdown Betties (Roxie Cotton and Annie Social) to become the WSU Tag Team Champions. A month later, on March 7, they defeated The Beatdown Betties in a rematch to retain the championship. On April 10, 2009 Carter participated in the J-CUP tournament, but was defeated by Rain in the 1st round. The AC Express hold the championships until Miss April signed a contract with World Wrestling Entertainment, then WSU allowed Carter to choose a replacement and she chose Alicia. Carter and Alicia lost the championships to Hailey Hatred and Jessicka Havok on August 22, 2009, at the As the World Turns event. In November 2009, Brittney wrestled Beth Phoenix on an episode of WWE SmackDown.

On October 3, 2009, Jessicka Havok and Hailey Hatred defeated Alicia and Carter to retain the WSU Tag Team Championship and after the match, Carter turned heel and attacked Alicia and revealed that she was aligned with manager Rick Cataldo. Carter changed her name to Brittney Savage, and began curb stomping Alicia until Becky Bayless made the save. On October 10, 2009, the evil Brittney Savage defeated Becky Bayless and Latasha in a triple threat match to win her first WSU Spirit Championship. On December 12, 2009, Savage lost the championship to Alicia, but she managed to re-capture the championship after an interference from Rick Cataldo. Brittney once again lost the Spirit Championship to Alicia in a triple threat match also featuring Brittany Force and on the same night Savage regained the championship. On November 5, 2010, Brittany Savage successfully defended the Spirit championship against Divina Fly. On January 15, 2011. Savage teamed up with Rick Cataldo and they challenged The Belle Saints for the WSU Tag Team titles, but were unsuccessful. On June 4, 2011, Savage made an appearance for NCW Femmes Fatales in a victorious outing against Cherry Bomb.

On the WSU 4th Anniversary Show, Savage lost the Spirit Championship to Sassy Stephanie. After the match, she turned face attacking Rick Cataldo and proclaimed the end of "The Cosmo Club". Savage participated in the 2011 J-Cup tournament, where she defeated Cindy Rogers and Jana in the first two rounds. In the finals, she defeated Sassy Stephie, to earn a shot at WSU Champion Mercedes Martinez. On June 25, 2011 at The Uncensored Rumble IV, Savage unsuccessfully challenged Mercedes Martinez for the WSU Championship. Later on the show, Savage participated in the fourth annual Uncensored Rumble, but was eliminated by Amy Lee. On August 6, 2011 Savage defeated Lee in an "Uncensored Rules" match. After the match Savage turned face and on the second taping she aligned herself with Mercedes Martinez and Alicia, assisting them against Midwest Militia.

On April 28, 2012, Brittney won the J-Cup Tournament for second time after defeating Ezavel Suena in the first round, Annie Social in the second round and Athena in the finals to earn a shot at the WSU Championship. However, during her title match with the newly crowned champion Mercedes Martinez, the former champion Jessica Havok, interjected herself in the match making it a three–way after Havok invoked her rematch clause.

=== Shine Wrestling (2013) ===
In 2013, Brittney relocated to Florida and became a regular for Shine Wrestling. On March 23, Savage faced Su Yung in a singles match at Shine 8, but Brittany came out on the losing end.

On June 5, 2013, Brittney announced she would be retiring from wrestling in December. However, on July 21, she retracted her plans due to what she called something big happening to her. One month later on August 20, Brittney's plans fell through, and she officially announced her retirement from wrestling.

The following year, Brittney announced she would return to wrestling alongside her husband Jesse Neal. Only a couple months later, Brittney suffered a knee injury that caused her to again announce her retirement from wrestling, adding that she would continue to valet for Neal. On February 28, 2015, Brittney announced she was once again taking bookings and would return to the ring.

== Personal life ==
Before becoming a wrestler, she was a manager at Abercrombie and Fitch for five years. Savage has twelve tattoos. She was married to fellow professional wrestler Jesse Neal, and in December 2013 they announced they were expecting their first child, a girl named Brooklyn, who was born on April 12, 2014. In 2018, Savage became a full time manager at Tillys and is now in the beauty industry and working on getting back into modeling, as well as acting.

== Championships and accomplishments ==
- Pro Wrestling Illustrated
  - Ranked No. 24 of the top 50 female wrestlers in the PWI Female 50 in 2012
- Women Superstars Uncensored
  - WSU Spirit Championship (3 times)
  - WSU Tag Team Championship (2 times) – with Alicia (1) and Miss April (1)
  - J-Cup Tournament (2011, 2012)
- New York Wrestling Connection
  - NYWC Starlet Championship (1 time)
