= Melinda Padovano =

American professional wrestler

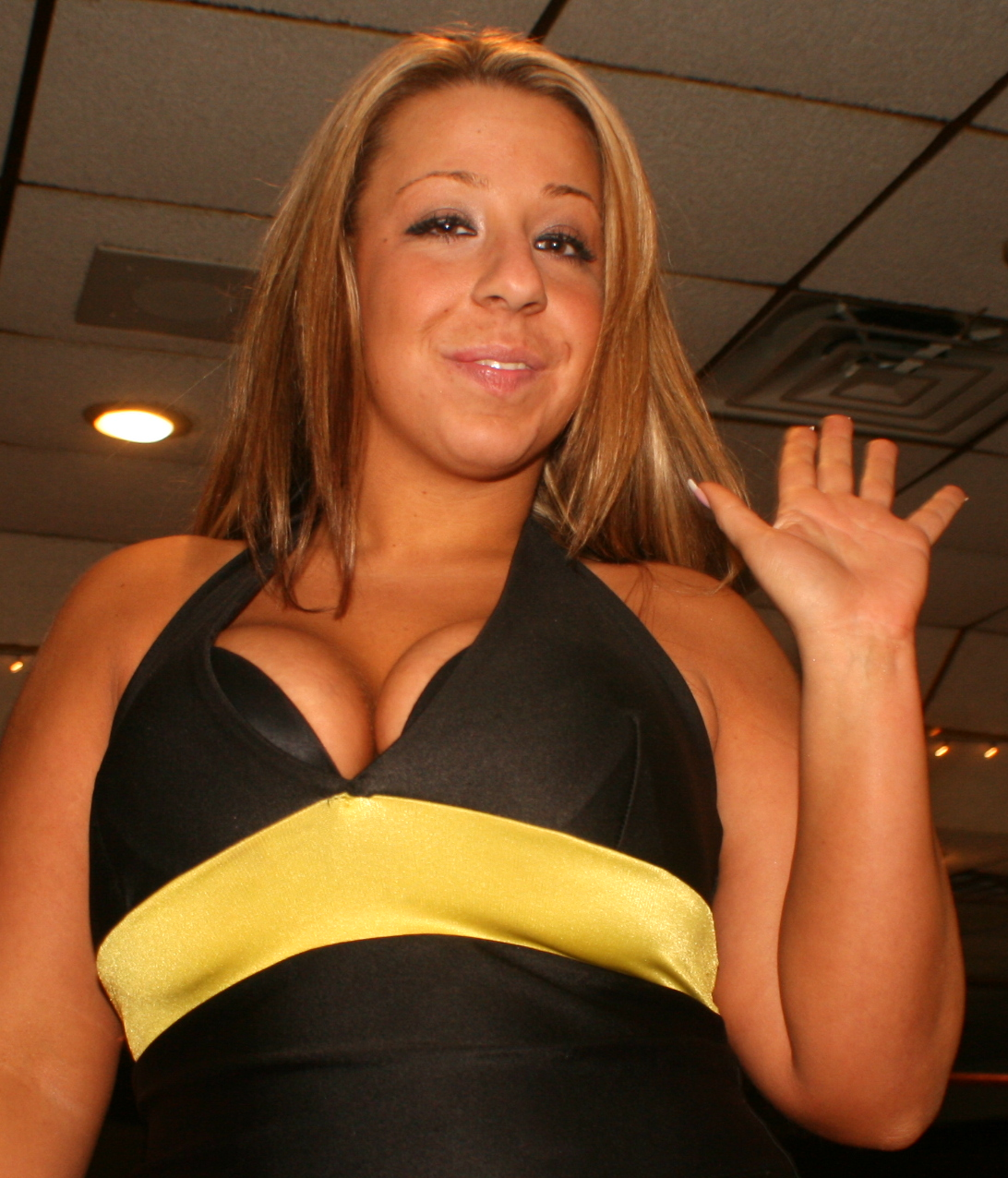
- Alicia in 2010

Personal information
- Born: January 28, 1987 (age 39) Hackensack, New Jersey, U.S.

Professional wrestling career
- Ring name(s): Alicia; Charity; Miss Alicia
- Billed height: 5 ft 4 in (1.63 m)
- Trained by: Kevin Knight; Independent Wrestling Federation; AWA Superstars of Wrestling
- Debut: 2002

Melinda Padovano (born January 28, 1987), better known by her ring name, Alicia, is an American professional wrestler. She has appeared for Shimmer Women Athletes, Women Superstars Uncensored, and has appeared for many independent promotions in the United States, including Ring of Honor and Jersey All Pro Wrestling.

== Professional wrestling career ==
Padovano originally began her training to become a professional wrestler while still attending jr. high school. Her interest in wrestling stemmed from a middle school boyfriend, who loved it.

In 2004, she won the SSCW Women's Championship and held it for approximately eight months before losing it to Alere Little Feather.

On October 23, 2005, she defeated Cindy Rogers to win the 2005 World Xtreme Wrestling's Elite 8 Tournament. On March 9, 2006, she won the WXW Women's Championship in a three-way dance with Rogers and Alere Little Feather.

=== Women Superstars Uncensored ===
==== WSU Champion and retirement (2007) ====
On March 3, 2007, Alicia made her debut for Women Superstars Uncensored by defeating Becky Bayless. On July 14, 2007, she defeated Luna Vachon, Nikki Roxx, and Amy Lee at the Women's Title Tournament event in a no disqualification falls count anywhere four-way tournament final to become Women Superstars Uncensored's first-ever WSU Champion. She lost the title to Alexa Thatcher on August 17, but regained it the next day. On December 22, at her retirement show, Alicia lost the WSU Championship to Tammy Lynn Sytch.

==== Return and WSU Tag Team Champion (2009) ====
Alicia made a surprise return at Uncensored Rumble II as she was announced as the new tag team partner of Brooke Carter, replacing Brooke's former partner, Miss April, who recently signed a WWE developmental deal. Alicia and Brooke went on to defeat Jessicka Havok and Hailey Hatred to become the new WSU Tag Team Champions. At the PPV "On the Road" the team of Alicia, Brooke Carter and Mercedes Martinez lost to the team of Angel Orsini, Hailey Hatred and Jessicka Havok. On 22/8 Alicia and Brooke Carter defeated Rain and Angel Orsini by DQ after Rain smashed Brooke Carter with a steel chair. Later in the night, Alicia and Brooke Carter lost the tag team titles to Jessicka Havok and Hailey Hatred. On October 3, Alicia and Brooke Carter lost the re-match for the WSU Tag Team Titles. After the match, Brooke Carter turned into a villainess by becoming the evil Brittney Savage, brutally attacking Alicia and aligning with Rick Cataldo. Later in the night, Alicia teamed with Becky Bayless defeating Brittney Savage and Rick Cataldo in a Tag Team Match.

==== Spirit Champion (2009–2010) ====
During the fall Brittney became WSU Spirit Champion by defeating Becky Bayless and Latasha in a Triple Threat Match. Alicia got her first WSU Spirit Championship Title Shot on November the 14th but Brittney retained by getting herself purposely counted out, NWS/WSU commissioner Gino Moore ordered an immediate rematch between Alicia & Brittney Savage for the WSU Spirit Championship on 11/21 at an NWS event in Ridgefield Park, NJ. Unfortunately for Alicia, Rick Cataldo made Brittney disqualified allowing Carter to retain once again. At 12/12 event of WSU it was scheduled a Tag Team Match between Latasha and Alicia and Jana and Brittney Savage. However Latasha couldn't make it there so it became a Single Match between Alicia and Brittney Savage with Jana and Rick Cataldo banned from Ringside. At the end of the match Alicia was able to score the win and become the First Ever Triple Crown Champion in WSU by Winning at least once WSU Championship, WSU Tag Team Championship and WSU Spirit Championship. Alicia and Brittney Savage will once again meet each other in the ring at the 3rd Anniversary Show of WSU. She successfully defended the title against Jana but she re-lost the title to Brittney Savage on the Third Anniversary Show due to Rick Cataldo's Interference. Alicia won the Spirit Championship back at "When the Tigers Broke Free", defeating Savage in a three way also involving Brittany Force, but would then lose the title back to Savage in an Empty Arena match taped for WSU's Uncensored web show, when Angel Orsini hit Alicia with her All Guts, No Glory championship belt.

==== Championship Pursuit (2010-2012) ====
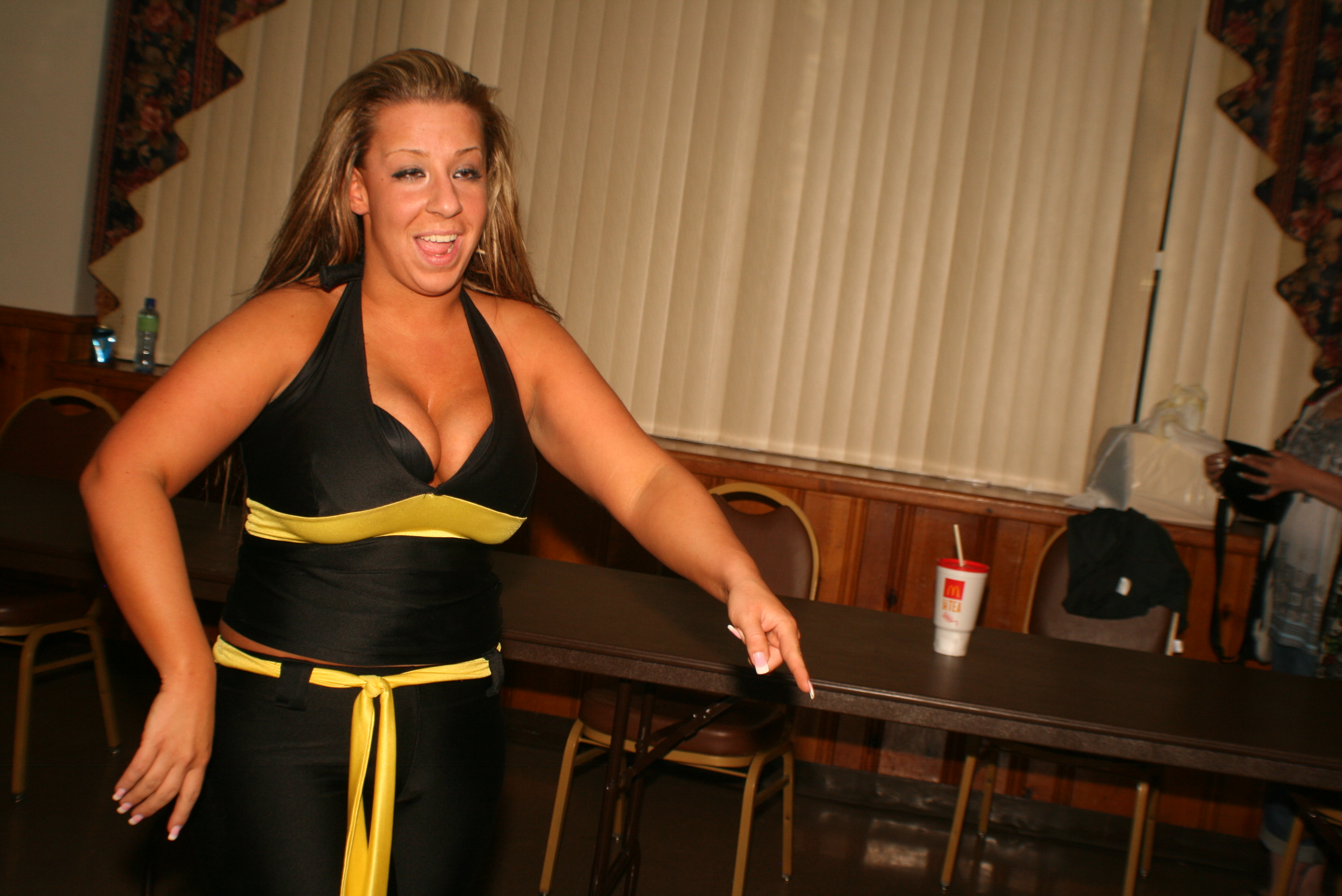
Alicia in 2010

On May 2, 2010, Alicia was able to win for the first time the Women's J-Cup Tournament. She defeated Tina SanAntonio, Brittney Savage and Angel Orsini, earning a title shot at the WSU Championship on June 26, 2010, against Mercedes Martinez. On May 3, 2010, Alicia also won the WSU King and Queen of the Ring tournament, teaming with Devon Moore and defeating the teams of Danny Demanto & Marti Belle, Nicky Oceans & Jana and Kevin Matthews Nikki Roxx. On May 15, 2010, Alicia teamed with Mercedes Martinez to take on the team of Brittney Savage and Velvet Sky. During the match Alicia accidentally hit with her finishing manoeuvre, allowing Brittney to pin Mercedes Martinez. After Alicia apologized to the WSU Champion, Mercedes hit her with the Fisherman Buster. The two faced off at WSU Uncensored Rumble III with Mercedes coming out on top after hitting Alicia with the Fisherman Buster three times and thus losing her WSU Championship. Only a few months later, on August 6, Alicia won the WSU Spirit Championship by defeating Brittney Savage and Brittany Force. However, her success lasted a very short time; after not even 24 hours had passed, Savage would defeat Alicia in an empty arena match. On November 6, WSU made its iPPV debut, which featured Alicia taking on Angel Orsini for the WSU All Guts No Glory Championship, which she lost.

2011 kicked off with a WSU Championship match against Mercedes Martinez and would once again come up short. In July, Alicia participated in her first Uncensored Rumble match where the winner would earn a title shot against the WSU Champion, which Lexxus won. Most of the year would prove to be uneventful for Alicia.

In early 2012, Alicia would begin teaming with Brittney Savage. The pair lost a number one contendership match the Midwest Militia and once the Midwest Militia cashed in their opportunity and won the WSU Tag Team Championship, Alicia and Savage would take them on and once again lose. In the first round of the 6th Annual J-Cup tournament, Alicia took on Lexxus and the match ended in a double count out. At Uncensored Rumble V, Alicia would defeat Lexxus in one on one action, continuing their feud, Lexxus would eliminate Alicia and win the rumble a second year in a row.

== Personal life ==
In May 2011 she graduated magna cum laude with a master's degree in communications.

== Championships and accomplishments ==
- Pro Wrestling Illustrated
  - Ranked No. 44 of the top 50 female wrestlers in the PWI Female 50 in 2012
- Stars and Stripes Championship Wrestling
  - SSCW Women's Championship (1 time)
- Women Superstars Uncensored
  - WSU Championship (2 times)
  - WSU Tag Team Championship (1 time) – with Brooke Carter
  - WSU Spirit Championship (2 times)
  - J-Cup Tournament (2010)
  - WSU/NWS King and Queen of the Ring (2010) – with Devon Moore
  - WSU Hall of Fame (Class of 2016)
- World Xtreme Wrestling
  - WXW Women's Championship (1 time)
  - Elite 8 women's tournament (2005)
