= Angel Orsini =

American professional wrestler

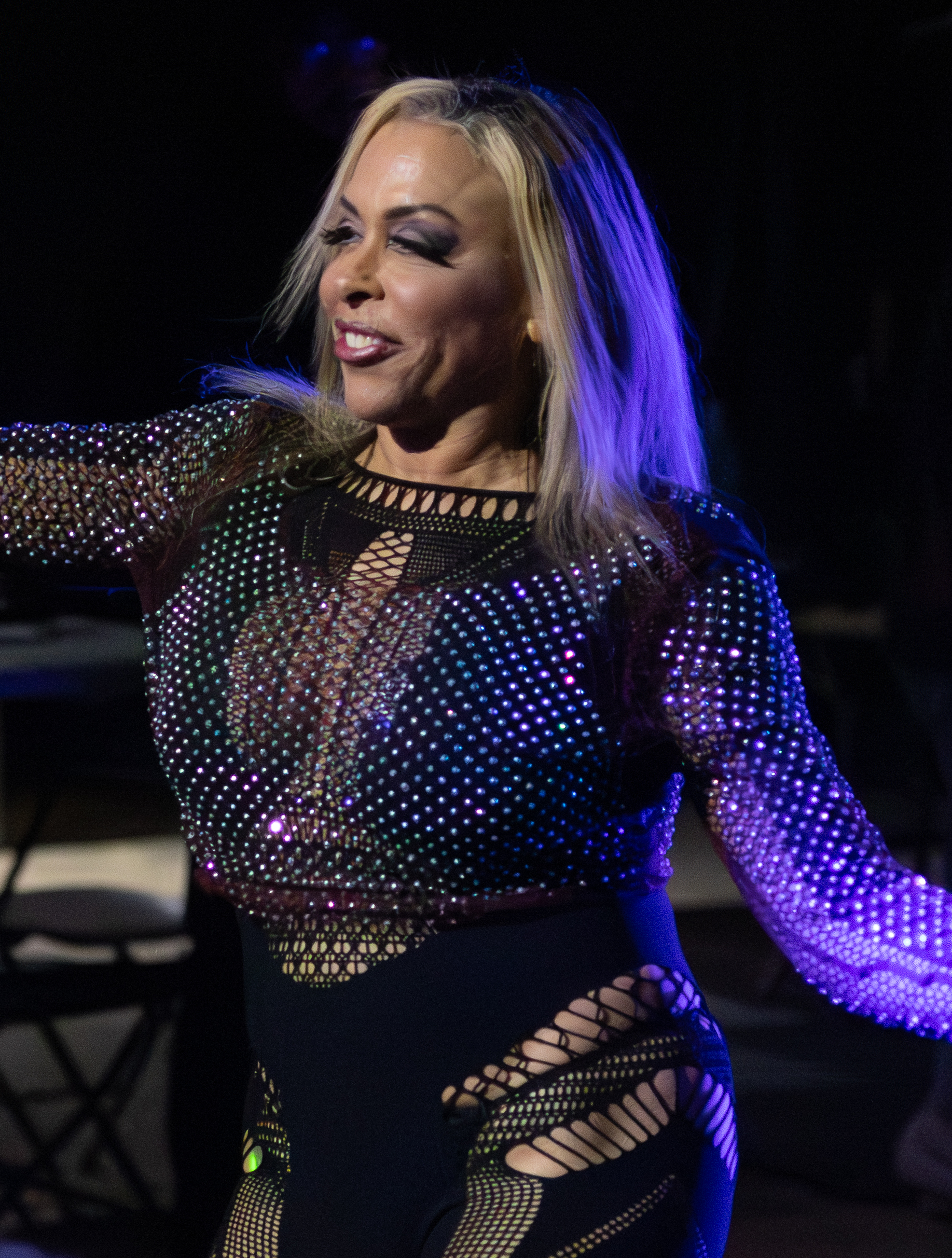
- Orsini in March 2026

Personal information
- Born: Angel Orsini; August 26, 1969 (age 57) Fort Lauderdale, Florida, U.S.

Professional wrestling career
- Ring name(s): Angel Orsini; Prodigette; Riptide
- Billed height: 5 ft 6 in (1.68 m)
- Billed weight: 155 lb (70 kg)
- Trained by: Liz Chase; Dusty Rhodes
- Debut: 1996

Angel Orsini (born August 26, 1969) is an American professional wrestler, bodybuilder and mixed martial artist. She has competed in North American independent promotions including Ohio Valley Wrestling (OVW), Women's Extreme Wrestling (WEW) and Extreme Championship Wrestling (ECW), where she was known as The Prodigette who managed the stable the 'Sideshow Freaks' during the last years of the promotion.

== Early life and martial arts ==
Born in Washington, D.C., Orsini became involved in bodybuilding and strength training in 1991 and, the following year, began studying Tae Kwon Do and Hopkido.

During 1993, she competed as a heavyweight in the North Miami Beach Bodybuilding Championship and the South Florida Bodybuilding Championships winning second place in both competitions.

After three years of training, Orsini became a Black Belt and entered an instructor training program eventually teaching Tae Kwon Do. That same year, she began training with Bart Vale in freefighting and mixed martial arts.

She began fighting professionally in 1996, winning the Florida State Continuous Fighting Championship before travelling to Japan to make her MMA debut against Yumiko Hotta in March 1996.

== Professional wrestling career ==
=== Early career ===
While in Japan, Orsini was persuaded by female wrestler Reggie Bennett to enter professional wrestling after watching Japanese female wrestling. Returning to the United States, she began training under Liz Chase in Royal Palm Beach, Florida and made her debut five months later facing Joanni Lee Lauer at the Iron Horse Saloon in Ormond Beach, Florida in October 1996.

She soon began wrestling for the Fabulous Moolah's Ladies International Wrestling Federation and eventually won several championship titles including the Sunshine Wrestling Federation Women's Championship defeating Luna Vachon in 1997 and defeated her trainer Liz Chase for the Florida Championship Wrestling and Ultimate Wrestling Federation titles during the next two years. She would also train Molly Holly for a career in professional wrestling, later going on to become a popular WWE Diva in World Wrestling Entertainment during the late 1990s.

In 1999, she became less active on the independent circuit fighting a mixed martial arts match for the hybrid-MMA promotion Pancrase at the Bronco Bowl in Dallas, Texas and again competing in the South Florida Bodybuilding Championships receiving second place. She also appeared twice on The Jenny Jones Show on a segment about women who intimidate men regarding their occupation and, the following year, on women in abusive relationships.

Orsini began wrestling in international promotions during the next year, touring Peru with Lita and participated in the Trans-Atlantic Challenge while in Great Britain.

=== Extreme Championship Wrestling ===
Orsini, who had previously sent a video tape of her wrestling matches to Extreme Championship Wrestling, was hired by promoter Paul Heyman and began appearing as The Prodigette managing the stable Sideshow Freaks which included Simon Diamond, Johnny Swinger, The Muskateer, Tom Marquez and Bilvis Wesley.

Feuding with Jazz, she also confronted male wrestlers including Jerry Lynn who put her in a piledriver at her last appearance at the ECW Arena. Staying with the promotion until its close in 2001, she was forced to miss the last house show after being severely injured in a car accident.

Although doctors had told Orsini that she had suffered a career-ending injury, she successfully returned to wrestling within six months and later won the PGWA Championship from Susan Green, she dedicated her victory to the memory of her trainer Liz Chase who died earlier that year.

After the demise of ECW, Orsini returned to competing in independent promotions including Women's Extreme Wrestling and Assault Championship Wrestling winning the WEW tag team titles with Simply Lucious defeating Tracy Brooks & Angel Williams.

=== European and US independent promotions ===
In 2004, she moved to Rotterdam to compete in European wrestling promotions including International Wrestling Stars (Eurostars) and Free-Style Championship Wrestling. Defeating X-Dream to win the FCW Lightweight Championship in Ghent, Belgium the next year. During this period, she also competed in an IWF Ladies Tournament as Riptide, meeting Lexie Fyfe in the final.

Orsini moved back to the United States in May 2005 and returned to mixed martial arts competition and training for a professional boxing career.

While in New England Championship Wrestling, she and Alere Little Feather defeated Mercedes Martinez and Cindy Rogers on June 4 and, the following night, defeated Luscious Lilly in the opening rounds of the NECW's All-Women's Tournament before being eliminated by Martinez in the second round.

Defeating Luna Vachon at a USWO event on October 14, she began competing for Ohio Valley Wrestling, a developmental territory for World Wrestling Entertainment, attempting to gain a contract with WWE.

She would continue wrestling for various independent promotions across the US until injuring both her heels in a ladder match against Sumie Sakai at an event for Dangerous Women of Wrestling on February 2, 2006.

Forced to take 14 months off, she returned to active competition one year later teaming with Amy Lee against Mercedes Martinez and Mickie Knuckles at a Pro Wrestling Unplugged event on February 17, 2007.

=== Women's Extreme Wrestling ===
Returning to Women's Extreme Wrestling, she defeated Amber O'Neal although she lost to Talia Madison in a match for the WEW Women's World Championship late during the main event in Philadelphia, Pennsylvania on May 5.

On July 12, she again wrestled two matches in one night, losing to Jazz in a TLC match with Francine as special referee and later defeated Annie Social.

=== Women Superstars Uncensored (2007–2011) ===
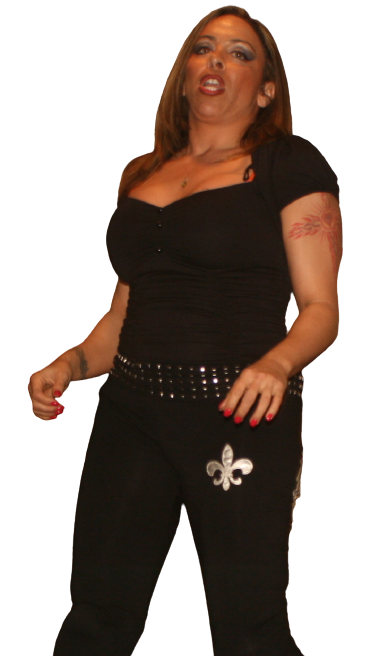
Orsini in the ring at a Women Superstars Uncensored event in 2010.

Making her debut in Women Superstars Uncensored in September, she was introduced Missy Hyatt who interviewed Orsini on her interview segment "Missy's Manor". During the interview, she was confronted by wrestler Rick Cataldo and attacked him when he attempted to interrupt her interview. She was then challenged moments later by former tag team partner Amy Lee and agreed to face her the following week.

During their match, only seconds after hitting Orsini with a DDT, the arena lights went out and Lee was attacked by a masked wrestler allowing Orsini to pin her for the victory. Following the match, the masked wrestler revealed herself to be Mercedez Martinez and attacked Lee along with Orsani. Following this incident, she and Mercedez would feud with Lee and Luna Vachon for the next several weeks. On May 31, 2008, in Rahway, NJ, she defeated Nikki Roxx to win the WSU Championship. Orsini lost the title to Martinez in a bullrope match on March 7, 2009, in Boonton, New Jersey.

Orsini defeated Annie Social, Trixxie Lynn and Rain in succession on April 10, 2009, in Bergenfield, New Jersey, to win the third-annual WSU Women's J-Cup Tournament. The tournament also featured Miss April, Brooke Carter, Roxie Cotton and Jennifer Cruz. The win garnered her another title shot that saw her battle Mercedes Martinez for 70 minutes in an ironwoman match, which Martinez won. Orsini would briefly team with and then feud with Rain before teaming up with her longtime rival Mercedes Martinez to win the tag team titles in November 2009. In 2010, Orsini returned to the finals of the J-Cup tournament but lost to Alicia.

Orsini created the "All Guts & No Glory Championship" at "WSU When the Tigers Broke Free" in August 2010, and defended the title that night against Awesome Kong, defeating her via DQ. Orsini would defend the title through the rest of 2010 against the likes of Alicia, Jamilia Craft, and the entire Cosmo Club. On January 22, 2011, Orsini faced Mercedes Martinez once again, this time in a ladder match with both Martinez's WSU Championship and Orsini's All Guts & No Glory Championship on the line to be unified. Mercedes defeated Orsini in what was the main event of WSU's Final Chapter iPPV.

== Championships and accomplishments ==
- Florida Championship Wrestling
  - FCW Women's Championship (4 times)
- Freestyle Championship Wrestling
  - FCW Lightweight Championship (1 time)
- Hot-TV Wrestling
  - HTVW Championship (1 time)
- Professional Girl Wrestling Association
  - PGWA Championship (1 time)
- Pro Wrestling Illustrated
  - Ranked No. 22 of the top 50 female wrestlers in the PWI Female 50 in 2009 and 2011
- Sunshine Wrestling Federation
  - SWF Women's Championship (1 time)
- Ultimate Wrestling Federation
  - UWF Women's Championship (1 time)
- Women's Extreme Wrestling
  - WEW Tag Team Championship (1 time) – with Simply Lucious
  - WEW World Championship (2 times)
- Women Superstars Uncensored
  - WSU Championship (1 time)
  - WSU Tag Team Championship (1 time) – with Mercedes Martinez
  - All Guts, No Glory Championship (1 time)
  - J-Cup Tournament (2009)
- Pro Wrestling Unplugged Super Powers of Wrestling
  - SPO Women's Champion (1 Time) Current
