= WSU Spirit Championship =

Professional wrestling women's championship

Details
- Promotion: Women Superstars United
- Date established: August 14, 2009
- Date retired: 2021
Statistics
- First champion: Luscious Latasha
- Final champion: Bryce Donovan
- Most reigns: Brittney Savage (3 reigns)
- Longest reign: Davienne (608 days)
- Shortest reign: Alicia and Rain (<1 day)
- Heaviest champion: Jessicka Havok (170 lb)
- Lightest champion: Brittney Savage (115 lb)

The WSU Spirit Championship is a women's professional wrestling championship in Women Superstars United (WSU). It is competed for in Women Superstars United, and has been defended on shows of sister promotion National Wrestling Superstars.

== Title history ==
As of March 14, 2026

Key
No.	Overall reign number
Reign	Reign number for the specific champion
Days	Number of days held
Defenses	Number of successful defenses
+	Current reign is changing daily

No.	Champion	Championship change			Reign statistics			Notes	Ref.
No.	Champion	Date	Event	Location	Reign	Days	Defenses	Notes	Ref.
Women Superstars United (WSU)
1	Luscious Latasha	August 14, 2009	WSU/NWS Spirit	Belleville, NJ	1	50	2	This was contested in a fatal four-way elimination match, also involving Amber, Jana and Roxie Cotton. Luscious Latasha pinned Jana to become the inaugural champion.	
2	Jana	October 3, 2009	N/A	Union City, NJ	1	7	0	This was contested in a three–way match, also involving Lea Morrison.	
3	Luscious Latasha	October 10, 2009	ACE Fallout 2009	Union City, NJ	2	<1	0		
4	Brittney Savage	October 10, 2009	ACE Fallout 2009	Union City, NJ	1	63	2	This was contested in a three–way match, also involving Becky Bayless.	
5	Alicia	December 12, 2009	NWS/WSU The Awesome Challenge	Flemington, NJ	1	84	1		
6	Brittney Savage	March 6, 2010	3rd Anniversary Show	Union City, NJ	2	153	5		
7	Alicia	August 6, 2010	When the Tigers Broke Free	Middletown Township, NJ	2	<1	0	This was a three–way match, also involving Brittany Force.	
8	Brittney Savage	August 6, 2010	WSU Uncensored #6	Union City, NJ	3	211	5	Savage defeated Alicia in an empty arena match.	
9	Sassy Stephanie	March 5, 2011	4th Anniversary Show	Union City, NJ	1	203	2		
10	Rain	September 24, 2011	Great Championship Wrestling event	Fairless Hills, PA	1	<1	0		
11	Jessicka Havok	September 24, 2011	Great Championship Wrestling event	Fairless Hills, PA	1	266	3	Havok challenged Rain shortly after winning the championship.	
12	Marti Belle	June 16, 2012	Uncensored Rumble V	Deer Park, NY	1	602	2		
13	Ezavel Suena	February 8, 2014	Mutiny	Voorhees, NJ	1	378	1	This was contested in a title vs. mask match. Niya competed under a mask as Ezavel Suena but then unmasked after the match.	
14	Nevaeh	February 21, 2015	8th Anniversary Show	Philadelphia, PA	1	53	0		
—	Vacated	April 15, 2015	—	—	—	—	—	The championship was declared vacant due to Nevaeh suffering an injury.	
15	Leva Bates	July 11, 2015	Control	Philadelphia, PA	1	497	4	Bates defeated Hania the Howling Huntress to win the vacant championship.	
16	Su Yung	November 19, 2016	Breaking Barriers IV	Voorhees, NJ	1	84	0		
17	Kiera Hogan	February 11, 2017	WSU 10th Anniversary	Voorhees, NJ	1	490	1	This was a three–way match, also including Veda Scott	
18	Jordynne Grace	June 16, 2018	Breaking Barriers 5	Voorhees, NJ	1	259	0		
19	Kris Statlander	March 2, 2019	CZW Trifecta Elimination 2019	Voorhees, NJ	1	189	4	The championship Changed hands during a CZW event	
20	Davienne	September 7, 2019	Is it Fall Yet?	Voorhees, NJ	1	608	3		
21	Bryce Donovan	May 7, 2021	Davienne’s Slumber Party	Worcester, MA	1	N/A N/A, 2021	0	Became the first male to win the title	
—	Deactivated	N/A N/A, 2021	—	—	—	—	—	The title deactivated in 2021 eventhough the company deactivated in 2020 Bryce Donovan was still noticed as the final champion.	

== Combined reigns ==
As of March 14, 2026

†	Indicates the current champion

Rank	Wrestler	No. of reigns	Combined defenses	Combined days
1	Bryce Donovan	1	0	N/A
2	Davienne	1	3	608
3	Marti Belle	1	2	602
4	Leva Bates	1	4	497
5	Kiera Hogan	1	1	490
6	Brittney Savage	3	12	427
7	Ezavel Suena/Niya	1	1	378
8	Jessicka Havok	1	3	266
9	Jordynne Grace	1	0	259
10	Sassy Stephanie	1	2	203
11	Kris Statlander	1	4	189
12	Alicia	2	1	84
12	Su Yung	1	0	84
14	Nevaeh	1	0	53
15	Luscious Latasha	2	2	50
16	Jana	1	0	7
17	Rain	1	0	<1
