= WSU Championship =

Professional wrestling women's championship

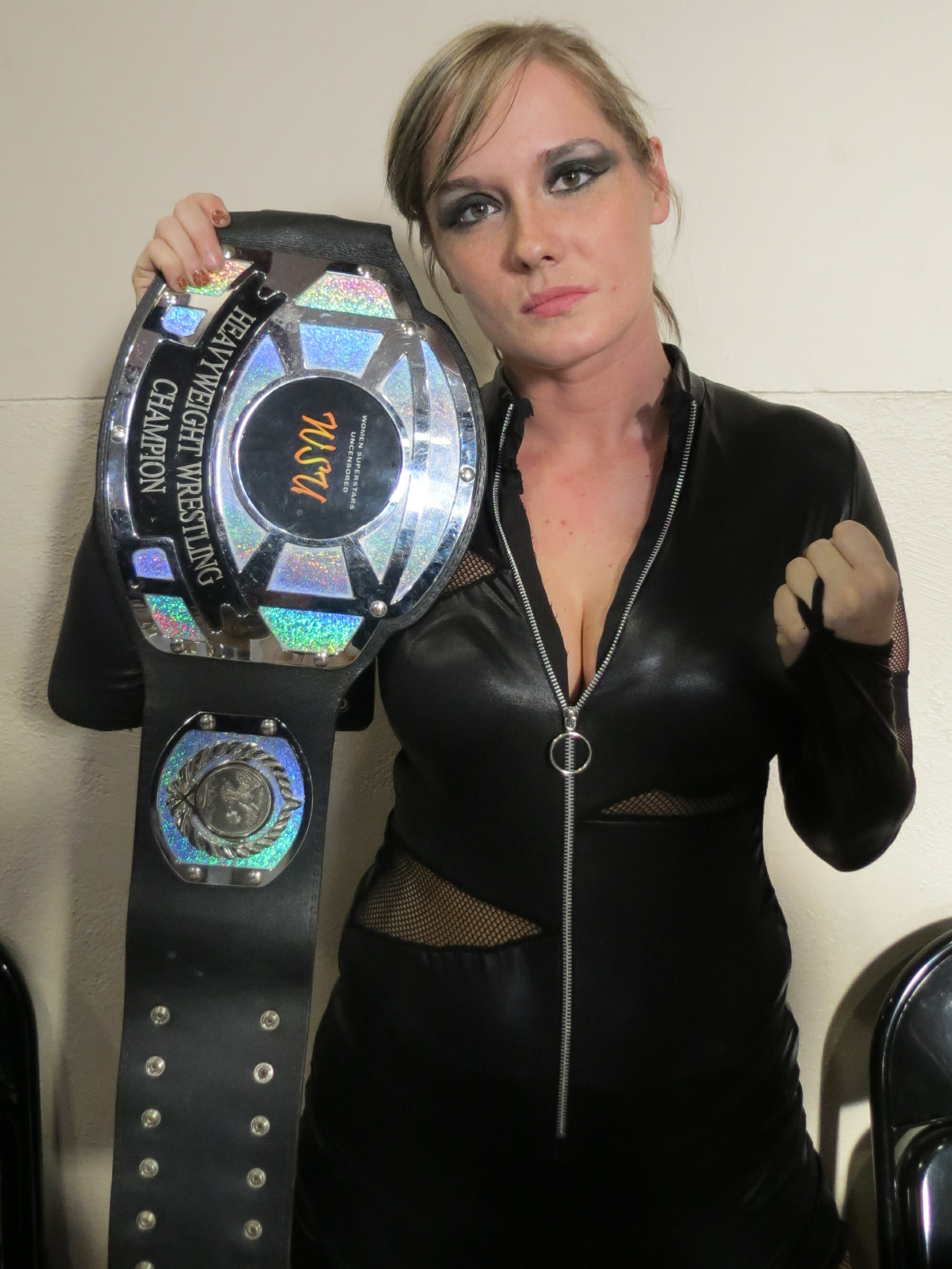
- Jessicka Havok with the championship in 2012

Details
- Promotion: Women Superstars United
- Date established: July 14, 2007
- Date retired: 2020
Statistics
- First champion: Alicia
- Final champion: Brittany Blake
- Most reigns: Mercedes Martinez (3 times)
- Longest reign: Mercedes Martinez (1,092 days)
- Shortest reign: Mercedes Martinez (<1 day)
- Oldest champion: Angel Orsini (38 years, 279 days)
- Youngest champion: Alexa Thatcher (20 years, 123 days)

The WSU Championship is a women's professional wrestling championship in Women Superstars United (WSU). It is competed for in Women Superstars United, and has been defended on shows of sister promotion National Wrestling Superstars. Championship reigns are determined by professional wrestling matches, in which competitors are involved in scripted rivalries. These narratives create feuds between the various competitors, which cast them as villains and heroines.

== Title history ==
=== Names ===
Name	Years
WSU Women's Championship	July 14, 2007 – July 14, 2007
WSU Championship	July 14, 2007 – August 1, 2008
WSU World Championship	August 1, 2008 – present

=== Reigns ===
Key
No.	Overall reign number
Reign	Reign number for the specific champion
Days	Number of days held
Defenses	Number of successful defenses
+	Current reign is changing daily

No.	Champion	Championship change			Reign statistics			Notes	Ref.
No.	Champion	Date	Event	Location	Reign	Days	Defenses	Notes	Ref.
Women Superstars United (WSU)
1	Alicia	July 14, 2007	Women's Title Tournament	Lake Hiawatha, NJ	1	34	2	Alicia defeated Amy Lee, Luna Vachon and Nikki Roxx in a no disqualification falls count anywhere four-way tournament final.	
2	Alexa Thatcher	August 17, 2007	National Wrestling Superstars	Belleville, NJ	1	1	0		
3	Alicia	August 18, 2007	National Wrestling Superstars	Neptune Township, NJ	2	126	8		
4	Tammy Lynn Sytch	December 22, 2007	Alicia Retirement Show	Lake Hiawatha, NJ	1	90	0		
5	Nikki Roxx	March 21, 2008	WSU/NWS King and Queen of the Ring Tournament	Bergenfield, NJ	1	71	1		
6	Angel Orsini	May 31, 2008	JAPW Full F'N Force	Rahway, NJ	1	280	16		
7	Mercedes Martinez	March 7, 2009	2nd Anniversary Show	Boonton, NJ	1	1,092	48	This was a Bullrope match.	
8	Jessicka Havok	March 3, 2012	5th Anniversary Show	Deer Park, NY	1	56	0	This was a Title vs. Title match which was also for the WSU Spirit Championship. Havok became the first woman to hold both championships simultaneously.	
9	Mercedes Martinez	April 28, 2012	J-Cup Tournament	Deer Park, NY	2	<1	0		
10	Jessicka Havok	April 28, 2012	Y.O.L.O.	Deer Park, NY	2	733	6	Havok interjected herself in the title match between Brittney Savage and Mercedes Martinez. The match was made a three–way after Havok invoked her rematch clause.	
—	Vacated	May 1, 2014	—	—	—	—	—	WSU stripped Jessicka Havok of the championship and banned her for life from the company.	
11	LuFisto	May 10, 2014	Queen and King Tournament 2014	Voorhees Township, NJ	1	364	5	LuFisto defeated Athena in a two out of three falls match to win the vacant title.	
12	Cherry Bomb	May 9, 2015	Power	Voorhees, NJ	1	644	2	During her reign as WSU Champion, Cherry Bomb broke her collar bone in a match but still manage to defend her title at that time.	
13	Mercedes Martinez	February 11, 2017	10th Anniversary Show	Voorhees, NJ	3	490	2		
14	Tessa Blanchard	June 16, 2018	Breaking Barriers 5	Voorhees, NJ	1	489	0		
—	Kris Statlander (Interim)	October 18, 2019	WSU Just A Bunch Of Hocus Pocus	Voorhees, NJ	1	45	0	Statlander defeated Diamante in the finals of a tournament to become Interim WSU World Champion.	
15	Kris Statlander	December 2, 2019	N/A	N/A	1	12	0	Statlander was promoted from Interim Champion to World Champion after Tessa Blanchard left the promotion.	
16	Brittany Blake	December 14, 2019	CZW Cage of Death XXI	Voorhees, NJ	1	N/A	2		
—	Deactivated	2020	—	—	—	—	—	The title deactivated when the company shutdown in 2020.	

== Combined reigns ==
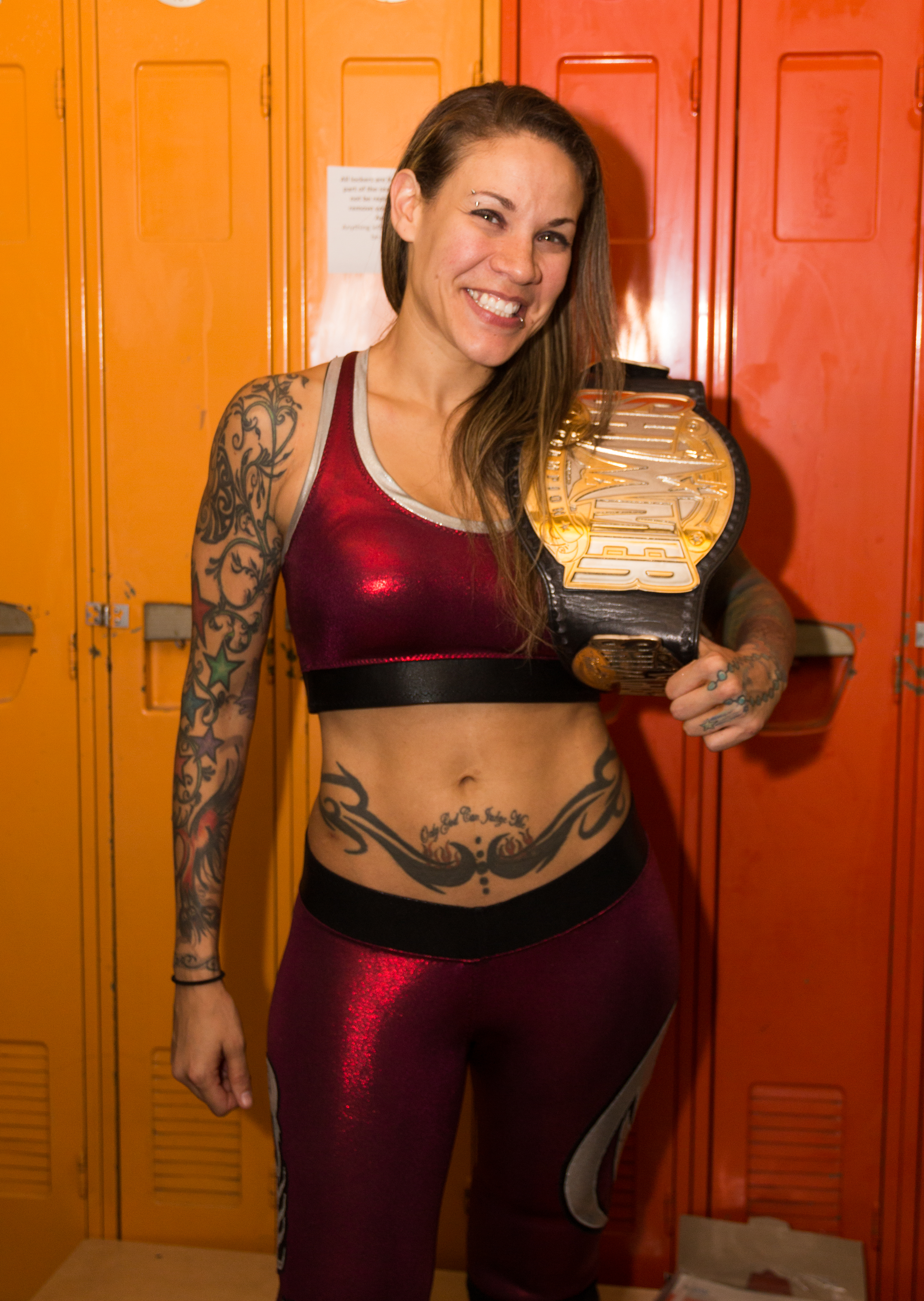
Mercedes Martinez (pictured with the Shimmer Championship) is the only three-time champion.

As of March 4, 2026

†	Indicates the current champion

Rank	Wrestler	No. of reigns	Combined defenses	Combined days
1	Mercedes Martinez	3	50	1,582
2	Jessicka Havok	2	6	789
3	Brittany Blake	1	2	N/A
4	Cherry Bomb	1	2	644
5	Tessa Blanchard	1	0	489
6	LuFisto	1	5	364
7	Angel Orsini	1	16	280
8	Alicia	2	10	160
9	Tammy Lynn Sytch	1	0	90
10	Nikki Roxx	1	1	71
11	Kris Statlander	1	0	57
12	Alexa Thatcher	1	0	1
