= Su Yung =

American professional wrestler (born 1989)

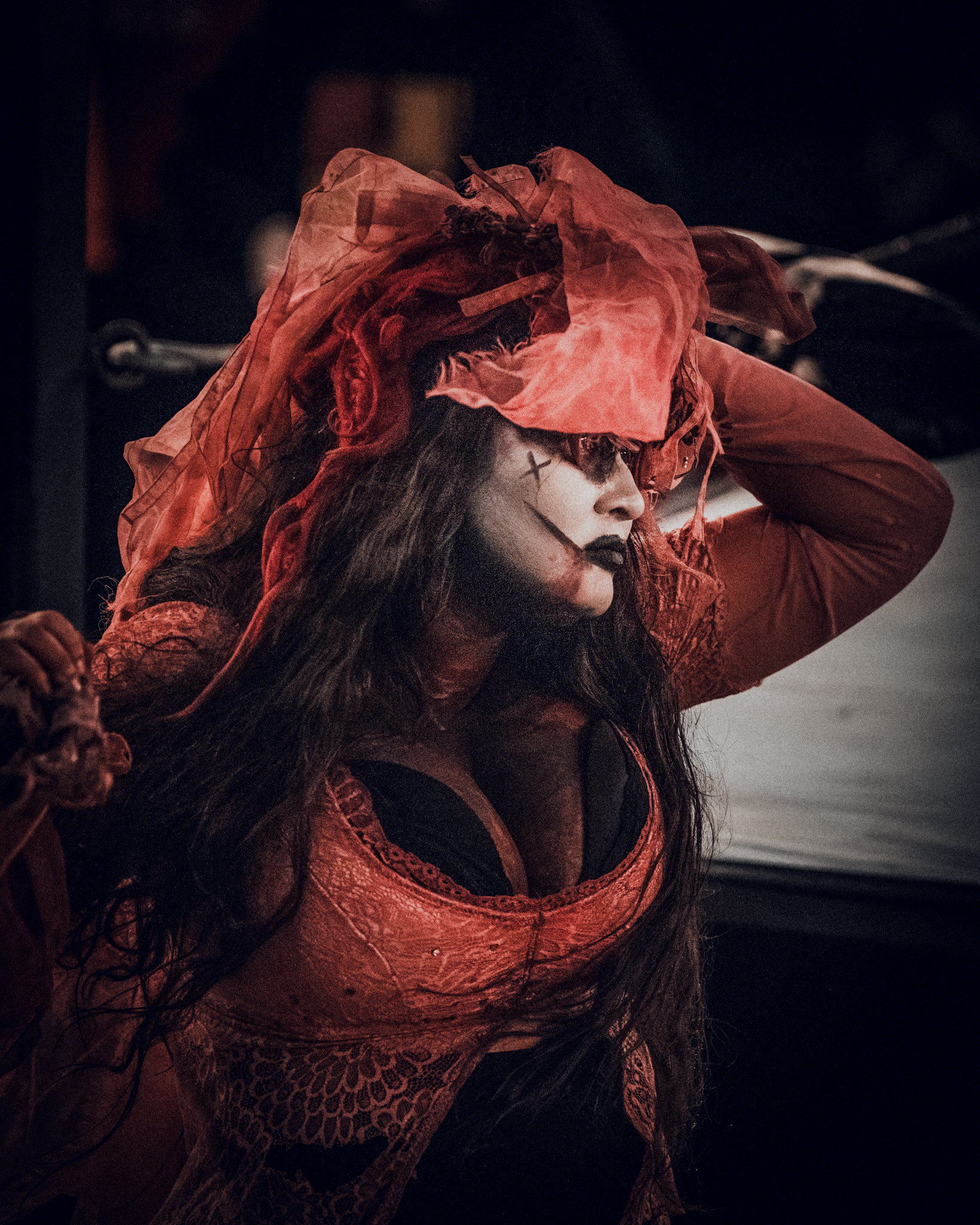
- Su Yung in February 2024

Personal information
- Born: Vannarah Riggs; June 30, 1989 (age 37) Seattle, Washington, United States
- Spouse: Rich Swann (m. 2017)
- Children: 1

Professional wrestling career
- Ring name(s): Sonia; Su Yung; Susie; Susan; Vannah
- Billed height: 1.68 m (5 ft 6 in)
- Billed weight: 52 kg (115 lb)
- Billed from: Seattle, Washington "Off The Grid"
- Trained by: Bill Dundee; Kevin White
- Debut: 2007

Vannarah Riggs (born June 30, 1989) is an American professional wrestler best known for her time with Total Nonstop Action Wrestling (TNA) under the ring name Su Yung, with the character also having the alter egos of Susan and Susie. Riggs is a former two-time Impact Knockouts Champion.

She had previously worked in WWE, where she competed in its developmental territory Florida Championship Wrestling (FCW) under the ring name Sonia.

== Professional wrestling career ==
=== Early career (2007–2015) ===
Riggs got her start in wrestling after moving to Memphis, Tennessee in 2007 to become a professional wrestler. She has worked for several promotions which include Lady Sports, MLL, GCW, and Jerry Lawler's Memphis Wrestling. In February 2010, Riggs made her debut for Main Event Championship Wrestling as a villainess under the name Su Yung and defeated Tracy Taylor. On July 1, 2015, Yung appeared on Total Nonstop Action Wrestling's One Night Only: Knockouts Knockdown event, which she lost to Taryn Terrell.

=== WWE developmental (2010–2011) ===
In May 2010, Riggs was signed to a developmental contract with WWE. On September 18, 2010, she made her debut at FCW house show under the name Vannah, sharing ring announcing with Matt Martlaro. The following month changed her name to Sonia. She then made her FCW in-ring debut as a heel on December 2, 2010 at a house show which she lost to AJ Lee. In mid-2011, Sonia teamed up with Audrey Marie against AJ and Aksana in which they were defeated. On July 8, Sonia was defeated by Aksana in a triple-threat match for the FCW Divas Championship which also included Naomi. On August 8, 2011, she was released from her developmental contract.

=== Shimmer Women Athletes (2011–present) ===
Su Yung debuted for SHIMMER Women Athletes on October 1, 2011 in a dark match at Volume 41; teaming with Kimberly Maddox and Veda Scott in a losing effort against Buggy Nova, Jessie Brooks, and She Nay Nay. In another dark match at Volume 43, Su was defeated by KC Spinelli. On October 27, 2012, Su was defeated by Sassy Stephie at Volume 50 and again by Miss Natural the following day at Volume 52.

=== Shine Wrestling (2012–2014) ===
Su debuted for Shine Wrestling as a babyface along with Tracy Taylor to form The West Coast Connection on July 20, 2012. On that evening, the duo lost to Made In Sin (Allysin Kay and Taylor Made) at SHINE 1. A month later at SHINE 2, Su picked up her first Shine victory by defeating Kimberly and she and Tracy defeated Gabby Gilbert and Luscious Latasha at SHINE 3. Su's winning streak continued with victories over Rhia O'Reilly and Josie, but it came to an end at SHINE 6 on January 11, 2013 when she was defeated by Ivelisse.

At SHINE 7 on February 22, Su teamed up with Tracy and Mia Yim in a losing effort to Valkyrie members Made In Sin and April Hunter. A month later, Su defeated Brittney Savage via submission with her Yellow Fever finisher.

At SHINE 9, Su was defeated by Saraya Knight in a SHINE Championship Tournament qualifying match. In the tournament at SHINE 11 on July 12, Su was defeated by LuFisto in a four-way qualifying match that also included Nikki Roxx and Mercedes Martinez.

At SHINE 12 on August 23, Su again teamed with Tracy Taylor in a losing effort to Daffney's All-Star Squad members Nikki Roxx and Solo Darling. However, at SHINE 13, Su defeated La Rosa Negra, Taeler Hendrix, and the debuting Xandra Bale in a four-way match. Su competed against Solo Darling in back-to-back Shine events, losing at 14 and winning at 15. At SHINE 16 on January 24, 2014, Su was defeated by Mercedes Martinez.

At SHINE 17 on February 28, Su and Tracy Taylor teamed up in a losing effort to Made In Sin in the quarterfinals of the SHINE Tag Team Championship Tournament.

On April 18, Su defeated Rhia O'Reilly via submission at SHINE 18 and was attacked by Saraya Knight after the match. Later in the event, Su turned into a villainess by aligning with Valkyrie and attacking Ivelisse in the ring, and later attacking her tag team partner, Tracy Taylor, ending The West Coast Connection in the process. At SHINE 21 on August 22, Su was defeated by Nevaeh in a #1 Contender's four-way match that also included Amazing Kong and Leah Von Dutch. At SHINE 22 on October 10, Su defeated Amanda Rodriguez via submission.

=== Total Nonstop Action / Impact Wrestling (2018–2022) ===
==== Knockouts Champion and various storylines (2018–2019) ====
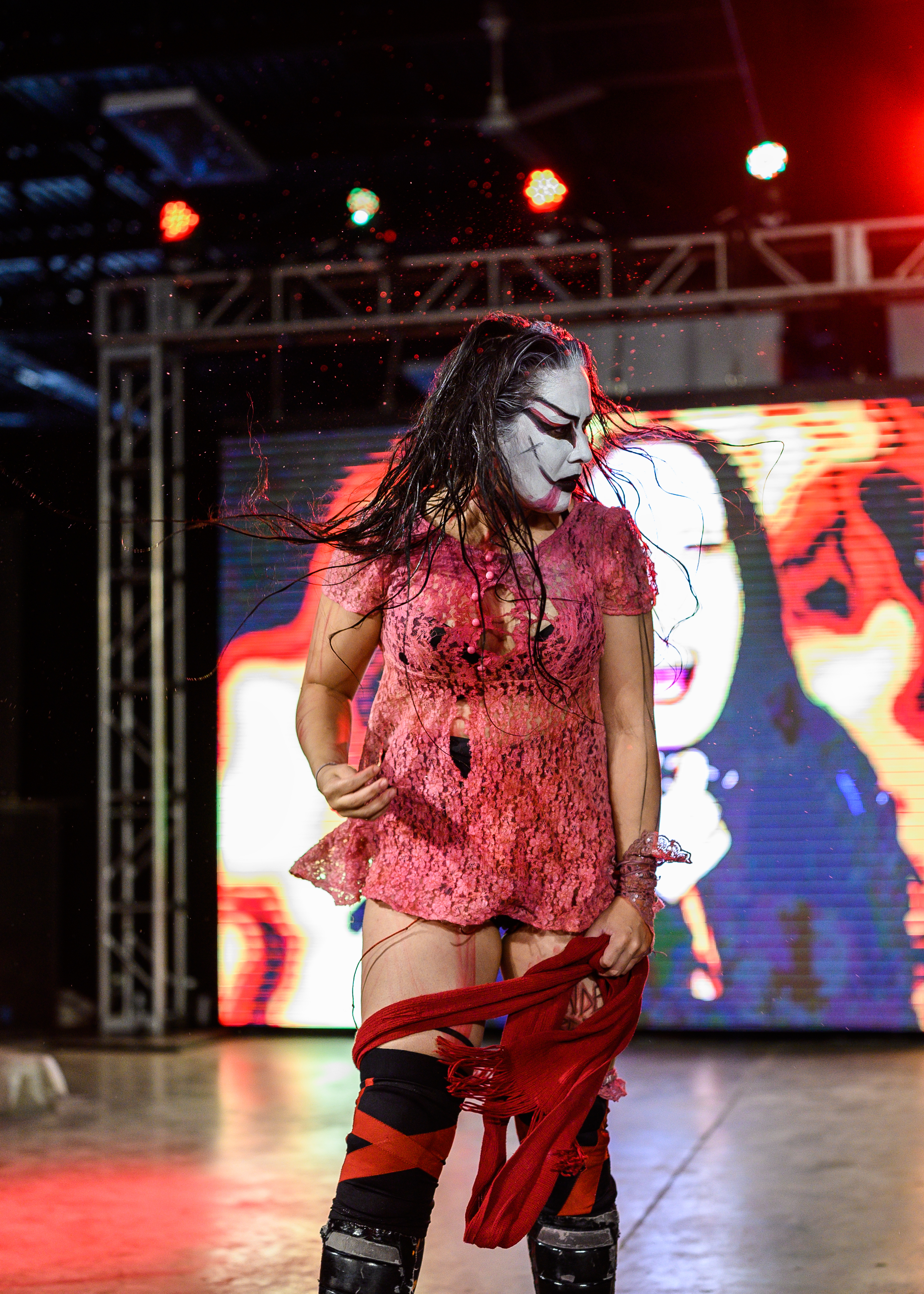
In 2018, Yung began working for Impact Wrestling.

Yung made her return to Impact Wrestling on the March 22 episode of the show, attacking Allie while Braxton Sutter proposed to her, establishing herself as a heel. That led to Sutter accompanying Yung through her matches. At Redemption, Yung faced Allie for the Impact Knockouts Championship, but she was defeated. After Yung lost, Sutter proposed to her but was misted in the face, ending their relationship. On the April 26 episode of Impact!, Yung debuted her legion of undead bridesmaids and attacked Allie in an attempt to put her in a coffin, until Rosemary rescued her. That incident started a rivalry between Rosemary and Yung, which led into a match between them on the May 3 episode of Impact!, that ended up in a brawl. Allie tried to help Rosemary, but Yung's undead bridesmaids held her back and forced her to watch, as Yung attacked Rosemary and put her inside a coffin.

On the May 17 episode of Impact!, Yung and her undead bridesmaids held a funeral for Rosemary, misting her coffin and setting it on fire. On May 31 (which was taped on April 24) at Impact! Under Pressure, Yung defeated Allie in a Last Rites match to win the Knockouts Championship for the first time in her career. At One Night Only: Zero Fear on June 15, Yung made her first successful title defense against Katarina. At Slammiversary XVI, Yung successfully retained her title against Madison Rayne. On August 12 (which aired on tape delay on August 30) at Impact! ReDefined, Yung lost the title to Tessa Blanchard in a three-way match that also involved Allie, ending her reign at 110 days. On the September 6 episode of Impact!, she received her rematch against Blanchard for the Knockouts Championship, but was unsuccessful in regaining the title. After Yung lost, she attacked Blanchard and tried to put her inside a coffin, until Allie and Kiera Hogan attacked Yung and rescued Blanchard.

On the October 4 episode of Impact!, Yung defeated Kiera Hogan in a match and got into a brawl with Allie who was saved by Hogan, but was able to put the latter inside a coffin. At Bound for Glory, Yung was attacked by Allie who entered the Undead Realm to rescue Hogan and dealt with a returning Rosemary as they escaped, with the former appearing to be possessed. Following the next couple of months, Allie showed a darker and villainous version of herself, aligning with Yung and turning on her friend Hogan under possession, thus turning heel for the first time since 2016. On the January 3, 2019, episode of Impact!, the newly formed duo attacked Hogan after a match, and were interrupted by Jordynne Grace who came to rescue her. This led to a tag team match at Homecoming, which they won as Yung technically submitted Hogan, but were soon confronted by Rosemary.

Yung continued her feud with Rosemary who wanted to get Allie back, and on the February 22 episode of Impact!, she got involved in the "Dark War" concocted by Father James Mitchell, where both Allie and Rosemary's lives were at stake. On the March 9 episode of Impact!, Team Su Yung (Yung, Allie and The Undead Maid of Honor) were defeated by Team Rosemary (Rosemary, Hogan and Grace), meaning that Allie belonged to Rosemary. On March 29 at Against All Odds, Yung was confronted by Rosemary who came to the Undead Realm to retrieve Allie's soul, and she "killed" the latter instead. After distracting her in a four-way match for the Knockouts Championship at United We Stand, their rivalry came to a head in a Demon Collar match on the May 17 episode of Impact!, with Yung losing to Rosemary and being dragged by her afterwards. On the June 7 episode of Impact!, she was freed from her control by a returning Havok, now aligning herself with Father Mitchell.

At Slammiversary XVII, Yung competed for the Knockouts Championship in a four-way Monster's Ball match against Rosemary, Havok and then-champion Taya Valkyrie. As Valkyrie retained her title, Yung's alliance with Havok began to see fractures. On the August 9 episode of Impact!, Yung prevented Havok from winning the Knockouts Championship against Valkyrie, leading to a match between the both of them on the September 6 episode of Impact!, where Yung disqualified herself after misting Havok in the face. The two would meet again in a no disqualification match on the September 20 episode of Impact!, with Yung losing to Havok after a tombstone piledriver. They continued to brawl backstage, ending with Havok wrapping a noose around Yung's neck and hanging her over the staircase rail, presumably killing her.

==== Susie (2019–2020) ====
On the October 29 episode of Impact!, Riggs made an appearance without her makeup, introducing herself as Susie. Susie continued making appearances over the following months, having no recollection of her past but slowly regaining her memories after coming across Havok and Father Mitchell, being coerced to join them. On the January 28, 2020, episode of Impact!, Rosemary invited Susie to a "friendly competition" against her the next week, where they fought each other to a double count-out and continued to brawl backstage, ending with Rosemary wrapping a noose around Susie's neck and resurrecting Su Yung. The next couple of weeks had her send both Father Mitchell and Havok to the Undead Realm. On the March 24 episode of Impact!, it led to a fight between Yung and Havok that saw both of them betrayed by Father Mitchell and sent to the Undead Wasteland, only for them to escape thanks to Rosemary and kill him.

Riggs reverted to her Susie persona on the March 31 episode of Impact!, fully aware that she terrified people as Su Yung and caused bad things to them. On the May 26 episode of Impact!, she aligned herself with Kylie Rae after they were bullied and beaten up by Kiera Hogan and Tasha Steelz, leading to a tag team match the next week, where they lost after Hogan pinned Susie with a swinging fisherman suplex. On the June 23 episode of Impact!, Susie was defeated by Taya Valkyrie in a singles match, and was continually insulted by her until Rae arrived to save Susie. On the July 14 episode of Impact!, she teamed with Rae, Havok, Nevaeh and Alisha Edwards in a 10 Knockout tag team match to defeat the team of Kimber Lee, Hogan, Steelz, Rosemary and Valkyrie. At Slammiversary, Susie competed in a Gauntlet for the Gold match to determine the number one contender for the Knockouts Championship, which was won by Rae.

On the July 28 episode of Impact!, Susie joined a bunch of wrestlers in the reality show Wrestle House. The following week, she teamed with Alisha Edwards to defeat Johnny Swinger in a mixed gender handicap match. On the August 11 episode of Impact!, Susie went on a date with Cousin Jake that goes wrong when her Su Yung persona briefly returns and scares him off. She naively blamed Edwards for the bad dating advice she gave her, leading to a match between them that Susie won by using a roll-up. On the September 1 episode of Impact!, Susie confronted Cousin Jake during his brawl alongside Cody Deaner against XXXL (Acey Romero and Larry D), angry that she broke the truce between the two teams and unknowingly "winning" the match. She and the rest of the Wrestle House cast returned to the Impact Zone during Knockouts Champion Deonna Purrazzo's Black Tie Affair, preventing Kimber Lee from attacking Kylie Rae.

On the September 15 episode of Impact!, Susie teamed with Kylie Rae in a winning effort against Deonna Purrazzo and Kimber Lee. On October 3 at Victory Road, she unsuccessfully challenged Purrazzo for the Knockouts Championship after submitting to the Venus de Milo. After the match, Purrazzo destroyed Susie and broke her arm in an attempt to send a message to Rae. At Bound for Glory, Susie returned under her Su Yung persona, replacing a no-show Rae in her match against Purrazzo for the Knockouts Championship, beating her to win the title for a second time. On November 14 at Turning Point, she dropped the title back to Purrazzo in a no disqualification match, ending her reign at 21 days. On the November 24 episode of Impact!, Susie returned to tell Purrazzo and Lee that they hurt her friend and she apologized for what was going to happen to them, leading to Su Yung appearing alongside Susie for the first time and attacking both of them. The following week, Yung confronted Purrazzo and Lee who were in the ring over her rematch for the Knockouts title, but was set up by Father Mitchell who agreed to help them, resulting in Purrazzo taking her out with the Cosa Nostra piledriver and being carried out by the undead bridesmaids.

==== Susan (2021) ====
On the January 5, 2021, episode of Impact!, Riggs appeared under a new businesswoman persona, introducing herself as Susan. Susan turned heel on the next week's episode of Impact!, aligning with Knockouts Champion Deonna Purrazzo and Kimber Lee by attacking Rosemary, causing a distraction that helped Lee defeat Taya Valkyrie. On the January 19 episode of Impact!, she teamed with Lee in a Knockouts tag team match against Jordynne Grace and Jazz, with Susan pinning the latter after a distraction from Purrazzo. Susan would lose to Grace in a one-on-one match on the February 2 episode of Impact!. At No Surrender, she teamed with Lee and Purrazzo for a six-Knockout tag team match against Grace, Jazz and ODB, with the latter making Susan submit and lose for her team. On the February 23 episode of Impact!, Susan and Lee lost to Grace and Jazz in a number one contenders match for the Knockouts Tag Team Championship, and would lose to ODB in a singles bout two weeks later. On April 10, at Hardcore Justice, Susan was set to compete in a weapons match to determine the number one contender for the Knockouts Championship, but was taken out by Su Yung who took her place instead.

On the April 22 episode of Impact!, Susan lost a match against Tenille Dashwood. Three days later, she teamed with Kimber Lee and fought Rosemary and Havok in a losing effort on the Rebellion pre-show. On the May 6 episode of Impact!, Susan lost to Taylor Wilde. At Under Siege, she and Lee lost a tag team bout against Dashwood and Wilde. On June 12, at Against All Odds, Susan and Lee fought against Fire 'N Flava (Kiera Hogan and Tasha Steelz) for the Knockouts Tag Team Championship in a losing effort. Five days later, she and Lee were told by Knockouts Champion Deonna Purrazzo that they were no longer needed at her side. After losing against Rosemary and Havok on the July 8 episode of Impact!, Susan was taken by Lee to see Father Mitchell in order to change her back to Su Yung, but on the following week, she revealed that she knew about her and drags Lee into a room before slamming the door.

==== Return of Su Yung and the Undead Bridesmaids (2021-2022) ====
On the July 29 episode of Impact!, Yung returned and revealed a transformed Lee under her control. The following weeks saw both Yung and Lee confront Brandi Lauren and convert her into an undead zombie. On part 2 of IMPACT Wrestling Best of 2021, Yung attacked Lee and Lauren for failing to deliver her souls, before revealing that she's pregnant.

== Personal life ==
She married fellow professional wrestler Rich Swann in March 2017.

On December 10, 2017, Swann was arrested in Gainesville, Florida on charges of battery and kidnapping/false imprisonment. The victim was identified as his wife. According to the arrest report, Swann and Riggs had gotten into an argument over Swann critiquing Riggs' performance at a show that night. When Riggs tried to get away from Swann, witnesses state that he grabbed her in a headlock and dragged her back into his car. Swann was released from Alachua County Jail later that same day and told to get in contact with court services. On January 25, 2018, all charges against Swann were dismissed, when a determination was made by prosecutors that there was "insufficient evidence" to move forward with the case.

On December 30, 2021, Riggs announced on her Twitter account that she was pregnant with her and Swann's first child. Their son was born in February 2022.

== Championships and accomplishments ==
- Anarchy Championship Wrestling
  - ACW American Joshi Championship (2 time)
- Atomic Revolutionary Wrestling
  - ARW Bombshells Championship (1 time)
- DDT Pro-Wrestling
  - Ironman Heavymetalweight Championship (1 time)
- FEST Wrestling
  - FEST Wrestling Championship (1 time)
- Girl Fight
  - Girl Fight Championship (1 time)
- Impact Wrestling
  - Impact Knockouts Championship (2 times)
- Independent Championship Wrestling
  - ICW Women's Championship (1 time)
- Kaiju Big Battel
  - Kaiju Double Danger Tandem Championship (1 time) - with Hell Monkey
- Magnificent Ladies Wrestling
  - MLW Championship (1 time)
- Pro Wrestling 2.0
  - PW2.0 Women's Championship (1 time)
- Pro Wrestling Illustrated
  - Ranked No. 13 of the top 50 female singles wrestlers in the PWI Female 50 in 2018
- RISE Wrestling
  - RISE Debut of The Year (2018)
- Queens Of Combat
  - Queens of Combat Championship (1 time)
- Uce Wrestling
  - Women's championship (1 time)
- Women Superstars Uncensored / United
  - WSU Tag Team Championship (1 time, final) - with Ruthless Lala
  - WSU Spirit Championship (1 time)
  - WSU King and Queen of the Ring (2017) – with Blackwater
