= Becky Bayless =

American professional wrestler

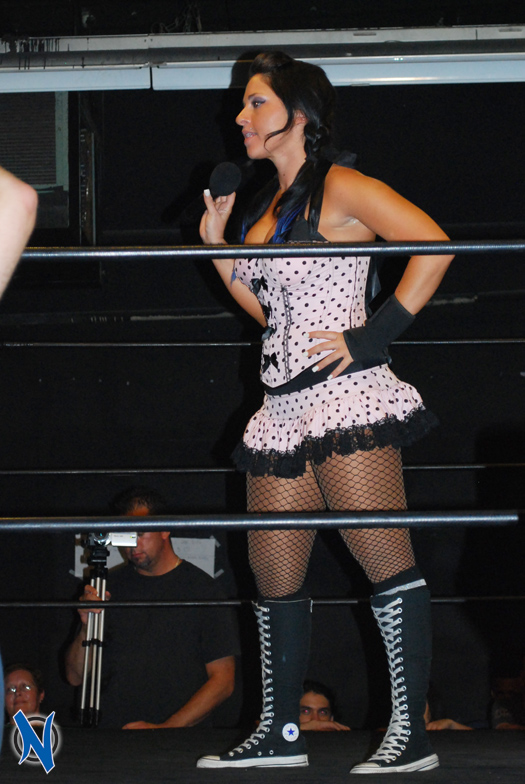
- Becky Bayless in mid-2010

Personal information
- Born: Rebecca Treston; February 3, 1982 (age 44) Queens, New York, U.S.

Professional wrestling career
- Ring name(s): Becky Bayless; Brooke Lynn; Cookie; Rebecca Bayless
- Billed height: 5 ft 2 in (1.57 m)
- Billed weight: 122 lb (55 kg)
- Billed from: Queens, New York City, New York; The Jersey Shore
- Trained by: Homicide
- Debut: 2002
- Retired: 2013

Rebecca Treston (born February 3, 1982), better known by her ring name Rebecca "Becky" Bayless, is an American professional wrestler, currently working for independent promotions such as Women's Extreme Wrestling, Wrestling Superstars Unleashed, Wrestlicious, and Women Superstars Uncensored. In the past she has worked for a number of major independent promotions, primarily Ring of Honor (ROH), Full Impact Pro, and Shimmer Women Athletes. She is also known for working for Total Nonstop Action Wrestling (TNA) under the ring name Cookie and for ROH and Shimmer as a backstage/in-ring interviewer.

== Career ==
Prior to her 2004 accident, Bayless was initially known as a valet for wrestlers, particularly Jimmy Jacobs, and mostly in Combat Zone Wrestling and IWA-Mid South, but occasionally wrestled for promotions. This includes during one 3-way tag team match in Mid South where during a point when many wrestlers performed 'Dives' off an announce position, Bayless herself leaped on top of the participating wrestlers, including the ones she was managing, shortly followed by commentator Dave Prazak and the referee of the match.

=== Ring of Honor (2003–2004; 2007) ===
Bayless made her debut in Ring of Honor (ROH) in 2003, as part of the Special K stable as a valet. During her time she wrestled occasionally, including losses to Alexis Laree. The high point during this time was Bayless' involvement in the break-up of the stable in the later part of 2004. After a series of losses suffered by her teammates, she began arguing with fellow stablemate Lacey. This ultimately leading to cat fights after matches, and eventually the break-up on ROH's show on December 4 when after a six-man tag team loss to three ROH wrestling school students, the team of Izzy, Deranged and Lacey turned on Dixie, Angel Dust and Bayless. Later in the month, December 26, the two sides would meet in a mixed tag tam match, where Bayless would be pinned by Lacey. Following a severe automobile accident, this would be the last Bayless would be seen anywhere in wrestling for a number of years, and subsequently was written out of the storyline.

In 2007, Bayless returned to ROH and to pro wrestling at ROH's January 26 event, conducting an in-ring interview with the then new ROH World Champion Homicide. Bayless remained in the role as backstage and in-ring interviewer for the duration of her time with Ring of Honor, regularly being seen on DVD releases in promos and interview segments, and on ROH VideoWire updates in the same roles.

=== Wrestlicious (2009–2010) ===
In early 2009, Bayless signed with Jimmy Hart's Wrestlicious series, which began airing in March 2010. She debuted on the fifth episode on March 31, under the ring name Brooke Lynn, as the new co-host of Take Down, replacing Leyla Milani, who was inactive due to scheduling issues. Lynn made her in-ring debut facing Alexandra the Great in a losing effort via disqualification when Kickstart Katie attacked Alexandra. Lynn was also one of the 20 wrestlers competing in the "Hoedown Throwdown" 20-girl battle royal to determine the two contenders for the Wrestlicious Takedown title, eliminating Charlotte, the Southern Belle before being eliminated by Alexandra. On the May 19 episode of Takedown, Lynn cost Kickstart Katie her submission match against Alexandra the Great. She ended up losing when Lacey Von Erich put Lynn in the Von Erich Claw to make her drop her towel and give Alexandra the victory over Katie. She was set to team up with Azizza against Amber Lively and Marley but claimed that Lacey Von Erich injured her during the course of the last match. They would be replaced by The Lunch Ladies.

=== Women Superstars Uncensored (2007–present) ===
Since her return, Bayless has had a long-standing feud with Alicia in Wrestling Superstars Unleashed, and in their sister all-women's promotion Women Superstars Uncensored. This cumulated on September 22, 2007, with a loss in a No-DQ grudge match for the WSU Women's Title which was billed as Alicia's retirement match. The next night Bayless and Alicia revealed that their feud had been a plan between the two to make the other look good in the ring. Alicia attempted to hand her title to Bayless, but they were interrupted by Tammy Lynn Sytch who stopped their plan, and following an impromptu match Sytch won the title herself. Since then Bayless has feuded with Sytch, and also Dawn Marie and Missy Hyatt who were brought in as managers/opponents against Bayless. The feud included a double turn in Bayless' match against Marie at the 2008 J-Cup Tournament, with Bayless turning face due to Marie working as a villainous character, as well as Sytch becoming a heel manager for Marie.

She left WSU in mid-2010 when she signed with TNA in the middle of 2010, but as soon as she left TNA, she returned to WSU in November 2011 to resume her feud with Rick Cataldo, defeating him on WSU iPPV. Bayless quickly got a shot at the WSU Spirit Championship, but was defeated by Jessicka Havok. At the WSU's 5th Anniversary Show pay-per-view, Bayless lost to Jennifer Cruz after Cruz used the ropes.

=== Total Nonstop Action Wrestling (2010–2011) ===
On the June 5, 2008, episode of TNA Impact!, Bayless made a one-off appearance as a candidate for Awesome Kong's $25,000 Fan Challenge along with fellow wrestlers Amber O'Neal, and Daffney who was picked for the challenge.

At the August 10, 2010, tapings of Impact! Treston, working under the name Cookie with a gimmick inspired by the television show Jersey Shore, managed Robbie E in a dark match, where he defeated Jeremy Buck. On August 18, it was reported that TNA had signed Treston to a contract. On the edition of August 26 of Impact!, vignettes began airing to promote Cookie's and Robbie E's upcoming debuts. Prior to their televised debuts, Cookie and Robbie E made an appearance on September 24 at TNA's live event at The Arena in Philadelphia, Pennsylvania, interrupting Jeremy Borash and insulting the crowd, before Robbie was defeated in a match by Rhino. At the following day's event in Rahway, New Jersey, Cookie and Robbie interrupted Mick Foley, before Robbie was again defeated in a match against Rhino, with Foley serving as the special guest referee. Robbie and Cookie made their televised debuts on the October 7 live episode of Impact!, cutting a promo insulting the Florida crowd. The following Sunday at Bound for Glory, the two made their pay-per-view debuts, when Robbie attacked X Division Champion Jay Lethal after his title match with Douglas Williams, claiming he was a disgrace to New Jersey. Cookie and Robbie gained mainstream attention on the following edition of Impact!, when Cookie had a cat fight with Jersey Shore cast member Jenni "JWoww" Farley. On November 7 at Turning Point, Cookie helped Robbie defeat Jay Lethal to win the TNA X Division Championship. On the following edition of Impact!, Cookie made her televised in-ring debut in a tag team match, where she and Robbie defeated Lethal and Taylor Wilde. On the edition of December 16 of Impact!, Robbie lost the X Division Championship back to Lethal, after Christy Hemme came out and prevented Cookie from interfering in the match. In February 2011, Cookie and Robbie became embroiled in a feud with X Division Champion Kazarian and his wife Traci Brooks. On the edition of March 3 of Impact!, Cookie and Robbie aligned themselves with former Jersey Shore cast member Angelina Pivarnick, with whom they bonded through their mutual dislike of Jenni "JWoww" Farley, whom Pivarnick proceeded to challenge to a match. The following week, Cookie teamed with Pivarnick and Sarita in a six knockout tag team match, where they were defeated by Angelina Love, Velvet Sky and Winter. On the edition of August 11 of Impact Wrestling, Robbie broke up with Cookie, after she inadvertently cost him his match against X Division Champion Brian Kendrick. On August 26, Treston announced that she had parted ways with TNA, reportedly after the promotion decided not to renew her contract.

=== Other promotions (2007–2013) ===
In Shimmer Women Athletes, a sister promotion to ROH, Bayless fulfilled the same on-camera role she has in ROH as an in-ring and backstage interviewer for the company, alongside Valerie Malone and Amber Gertner. Bayless was part of The YRR stable in Full Impact Pro in the role of a valet.

== Personal life ==
On December 31, 2004, Bayless was involved in a severe automobile accident. Bayless suffered internal bruising, a sprained ankle, nerve damage to her neck and also injured her rotator cuff as a result. Prior to this, Bayless was planning to study overseas in Europe and as a result, those plans were cancelled.

== Championships and accomplishments ==
- Pro Wrestling Illustrated
  - Ranked No. 37 of the top 50 female wrestlers in the PWI Female 50 in 2008.
- Texas Wrestling Entertainment
  - TWE Texas Ladies Championship (1 time)
- USA Pro Wrestling
  - Miss USA Pro Beauty Contest Winner (2004)
