= Women Superstars United =

Women's professional wrestling promotion

- Acronym: WSU
- Founded: 2006
- Defunct: 2020
- Style: Women's professional wrestling
- Owner(s): Jac Sabboth (2006–2007); Sean McCaffrey (2007–2012); Drew Cordeiro (2012–2014)
- Parent: Combat Zone Wrestling, LLC (2013–present)
- Formerly: Women Superstars Uncensored; Wrestling Superstars Unleashed

Women Superstars United (WSU), formerly known as Wrestling Superstars Unleashed and Women Superstars Uncensored, was an American women's professional wrestling promotion based in New Jersey which has been inactive since 2020. Founded in 2006, WSU events combine professional wrestling interspersed with both serious and comedic storylines. In the early 2010s, WSU collaborated with other wrestling promotions such as National Wrestling Superstars and Dragon Gate USA. The company has remained inactive since 2020.

In 2013 WSU was purchased by the owner of Combat Zone Wrestling D. J. Hyde, and from then onwards CZW and WSU have been closely-linked, with WSU events often running in a venue earlier the same day of a CZW event.

WSU was considered one of the top women's wrestling organizations in the United States. The company claims to be "the leader in women's wrestling in the northeast" and to promote more cards than any other women's wrestling company in the country.

== Championships ==
Final champions

Championship	Current champion(s)	Reign	Date	Previous Champion
WSU World Championship	Brittany Blake	1	December 14, 2019	Kris Statlander
WSU Tag Team Championship	Ruthless Lala and Su Yung	1	December 28, 2019	Delmi Exo and Kasey Catal
WSU Spirit Championship	Davienne	1	September 7, 2019	Kris Statlander

== Tournaments ==
Tournament	Last winner(s)	Last held
Queen and King of the Ring	Su Yung and Blackwater	September 11, 2017
J-Cup Tournament	Shanna	October 12, 2013

== WSU Hall of Fame ==
In 2009, WSU created a hall of fame with an inaugural class of three members.

=== Inductees ===
Year	Ring name
2009	Malia Hosaka
2009	Missy Hyatt
2009	Sherri Martel
2010	Dawn Marie
2010	Jazz
2010	Molly Holly
2011	April Hunter
2011	Ivory
2011	Luna Vachon
2012	Cindy Rogers
2012	Dixie Carter
2012	Georgiann Makropoulos
2012	Jana
2015	Amy Lee
2016	Alicia
2017	Mercedes Martinez

== Pay-per-view events ==
On November 6, 2010, WSU aired their first internet pay-per-view (iPPV) event on GoFightLive.TV.

Event	Date
Breaking Barriers	November 6, 2010
Final Chapter	January 22, 2011
4th Anniversary Show	March 5, 2011
Uncensored Rumble IV	June 25, 2011
Breaking Barriers II	November 19, 2011
5th Anniversary Show	March 3, 2012
Uncensored Rumble V	June 16, 2012
Queen & King of the Ring 2013	May 11, 2013
Uncensored Rumble 2013	August 10, 2013
Blood & Thunder	October 12, 2013
Mutiny	February 8, 2014
Queen & King of the Ring 2014	May 10, 2014
United	July 12, 2014
Power	May 9, 2014
Resurgence	September 13, 2014
Breaking Barriers III	November 8, 2014
8th Anniversary Show	February 21, 2015
Excellence	September 12, 2015
9th Anniversary Show	February 13, 2016
Resurgence 2	September 10, 2016
Breaking Barriers IV	November 19, 2016
10th Anniversary Show	February 11, 2017
Battle Tested	May 13, 2017
Breaking Barriers V	June 16, 2018
Something Entirely New	March 23, 2019
Thank You for Being a Friend	April 26, 2019
Traveled Down the Road & Back Again	April 27, 2019
Once More, With Feeling	June 7, 2019
Summer, Kind of Wonderful	August 3, 2019
Is It Fall Yet?	September 7, 2019
Just a Bunch of Hocus Pocus	October 18, 2019
The Reckoning	December 28, 2019
No Glasses Required: We Have 2020 Vision	December 28, 2019
13th Anniversary Show	March 15, 2020
