= Dogg Pound Championship Wrestling =

American professional wrestling promotion

- Acronym: DPCW
- Founded: 2021
- Style: Professional wrestling
- Headquarters: San Antonio, Texas
- Founder(s): Rodney Mack; Jazz
- Owner(s): Rodney Mack; Jazz

Dogg Pound Championship Wrestling is an American professional wrestling promotion headquartered owned by former NWA World Tag Team Champion Rodney Mack, also known by his ring name Damage and former WWE wrestler Jazz. It is also a member of the National Wrestling Alliance (NWA) territory system under the NWA Texas sub-brand.

== History ==
On September 25, 2021, DPCW held their first show titled Strictly Business at the Woodlawn Gym in San Antonio, Texas. On November 25, 2021, DPCW crowned its first champion during the Hunt After The Harvest when Hoss Holding became the inaugural Pound for Pound Champion after winning a battle royal. On March 4, 2023, DPCW began holding tapings for a weekly show titled Paradox at the Schattenbol at the DeCock Farm in Castroville, Texas. On November 17, 2024, National Wrestling Alliance commentator Joe Galli announced during a taping for Paradox that DPCW would join the National Wrestling Alliance as the first territory under the NWA Texas brand. In 2025, the NWA revived the NWA Texas Championship under the NWA Texas banner, which comprises DPCW and Texas Style Wrestling. The first champion was crowned on May 25, 2025 during DPCW's Mutual Combat event at the Big'z Burger Joint in San Antonio, Texas as part of a tournament to determine the champion with Izzy James defeating Marovik in the final round. On July 9, 2026, it was announced that the promotion would be part of the MissionsCon pop culture convention on July 19, 2026 at the Nelson W. Wolff Municipal Stadium in San Antonio, Texas.

On July 10, 2026, DPCW owners Jazz and Rodney Mack were inducted into George Tragos/Lou Thesz Professional Wrestling Hall of Fame in the Verne Gagne Trainer Award category.

== Championships ==
Championship	Current champion(s)	Date won	Days held	Event	Location	Notes
DPCW Heavyweight Championship	Brandon Groom	July 27, 2026	59+			
DPCW Junior Heavyweight Championship	Sodapop	February 22, 2026	214+			
DPCW Pound for Pound Championship	Caramel Lightning	November 16, 2025	312+			
DPCW Women's Championship	C-Rex	March 30, 2025	543+			
NWA Texas Championship	Izzy James	May 25, 2025	487+			
NWA Texas Tag Team Championship	Colt Killbane and Leo Fox	July 27, 2025	424+			
