= NWA Shockwave Heavyweight Championship =

Professional wrestling championship

Details
- Promotion: NWA Shockwave
- Date established: October 29, 2002
- Date retired: 2007

Other names
- CSWF Heavyweight Championship (2002 - 2005); NWA Cyberspace Heavyweight Championship (2005 - 2006); NWA Shockwave Heavyweight Championship (2006 - present)
Statistics
- First champion: Smokey M
- Most reigns: All Champions have one reign
- Longest reign: Slyk Wagner Brown (309 days)
- Shortest reign: Chris Harris (<1 day)

The NWA Shockwave Heavyweight Championship was a professional wrestling heavyweight championship in NWA Shockwave (NWA-SW) and the National Wrestling Alliance (NWA). It was the original title of the CyberSpace Wrestling Federation promotion and was later recognized by the NWA as a regional title. It was introduced as the CSWF Heavyweight Championship on October 19, 2002. It was established as an NWA heavyweight championship in 2005 following the promotion's admission into the NWA. The promotion became NWA: Cyberspace, and later NWA Shockwave, with the title remaining active until the promotion's close in 2007.

The inaugural champion was Smokey M, who defeated Danny Doring, Kid USA and Sinister X in a four way match on October 19, 2002 to become the first CSWF Heavyweight Champion. There were 10 officially recognized champions, however none held the belt more than once. At 309 days, Slyk Wagner Brown was the longest reigning champion in the title's history. Many then current wrestlers from Total Non-Stop Action held the title during its 5-year history including Ron Killings, Chris Harris, Abyss, Bobby Roode and NWA-TNA World Heavyweight Champion Jeff Jarrett.

== Reigns ==
No.	Order in reign history
Reign	The reign number for the specific set of wrestlers listed
Event	The event in which the title was won
—	Used for vacated reigns so as not to count it as an official reign
N/A	The information is not available or is unknown

No.	Wrestlers	Reign	Date	Days held	Location	Event	Notes	Ref.
1	Smokey M	1	October 19, 2002	175	Flemington, New Jersey	Halloween Horror (2002)	Smokey M defeated Danny Doring, Kid USA and Sinister X in a four way match to become the first CSWF Heavyweight Champion.	
2	Sinister X	1	April 12, 2003	154	Rahway, New Jersey	Live event	Title is unified with the USWF Heavyweight Championship at "Legendary Breakout" in Flemington on January 23, 2003.	
3	Ron Killings	1	September 13, 2003	287	Rahway, New Jersey	T-NvAsion (2003)		
—	Vacated	—	June 11, 2004	—	N/A	N/A	The championship is vacated when Killings refuses to defend his title against Darkbird and is stripped.	
4	Slyk Wagner Brown	1	June 26, 2004	308	Wayne, New Jersey	Independent's Day (2004)	Defeated Darkbird to win the vacant title. On January 8, 2005, the title was renamed the NWA: Cyberspace Heavyweight Championship when the promotion joins the National Wrestling Alliance.	
5	Jeff Jarrett	1	April 30, 2005	203	Wayne	CyberSpace Retribution (2005)	From September 15 through October 23, 2005, Jarrett held both the NWA CyberSpace Heavyweight Championship and the NWA World Heavyweight Championship thus making him the only wrestler to hold both of those titles simultaneously.	
6	Chris Harris	1	November 19, 2005	0	Wayne	Above The Law (2005)		
7	Abyss	1	November 19, 2005	102	Wayne	Above The Law (2005)	This was a three way dance also involving Jeff Jarrett.	
—	Vacated	—	March 1, 2006	—	N/A	N/A	The championship is vacated when Abyss is stripped of the title.	
8	Bobby Roode	1	March 26, 2006	250	Dover, New Jersey	Disturbing the Peace (2006)	This was a four way match also involving Matt Bentley, Rodney Mack and Mana the Polynesian Warrior. The title becomes known as the NWA Shockwave Heavyweight Championship when the promotion changes its name in June 2006.	
—	Vacated	—	December 1, 2006	—	N/A	N/A	The championship is vacated when the promotion returns from a six-month hiatus following the death of promoter Billy Firehawk.	
9	Havok	1	January 13, 2007	140	Boonton, New Jersey	A New Beginning (2007)	This was a gauntlet match also involving Crowbar, Slyk Wagner Brown, Sinister X, Cindy Rogers, Boogalou and Paul E. Normus.	
10	Papadon	1	June 2, 2007	0	Clifton, New Jersey	Live event	This was a best of three falls winner-take-all three way dance for both the NWA Shockwave Heavyweight Championship and the NWA Shockwave Internet Championship involving Internet Champion Josh Daniels.	
—	Deactivated	—	2007	—	N/A	N/A	NWA Shockwave ceases promoting events and closes in late-2007.	

== See also ==
- List of National Wrestling Alliance championships
