= Front Row Wrestling =

American independent professional wrestling promotion

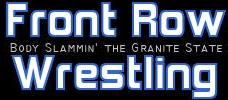
- Acronym: FRW
- Founded: 2003
- Defunct: 2012
- Style: American Wrestling
- Headquarters: Rochester, New Hampshire
- Founder: Scott C. Despres
- Owner: Scott C. Despres
- Sister: Eastern Wrestling Alliance
- Website: FrontRowWrestling.net; Front Row Wrestling on Myspace

Front Row Wrestling is an American independent professional wrestling promotion located in Rochester, New Hampshire. It is one of the few New England–based promotions outside Massachusetts, such as Pro Wrestling America Live in Maine and Joel Gertner's MXW Pro Wrestling in Connecticut, and is the only wrestling promotion active in the state of New Hampshire. Founded by wrestler Scott C. Despres in 2003, it is the sister promotion of Eastern Wrestling Alliance and an affiliate of the National Wrestling Alliance. FRW has co-promoted events and hosted sanctioned title defenses of both promotions.

A number of Northeastern independent stars competed for FRW, including Brian Milonas, Chase Del Monte, Tommaso Ciampa, Johnny Handsome, "The Alpha Male" Justin Powers and Antonio "The Promise" Thomas. The promotion also has a small women's division, largely dominated by Sarah Blackheart, Mistress Belmont and Vanity Vixxxen, but also brought in Sara Del Rey, Mercedes Martinez, Ariel, Alere Little Feather and Awesome Kong. Matt Calamare, the only working deaf professional wrestling referee, also regularly appeared for the promotion.

On February 26, 2010, Despres announced the promotion would be forming a partnership with NWA Liberty States, formerly No Limit Pro, to promote wrestling events throughout New England under the banner of the National Wrestling Alliance.

== History ==
Front Row Wrestling was started by Scott C. Despres, better known as New England independent wrestler Maverick Wild, in 2003 and held its first show in Milford, New Hampshire, that year. When Steve Bradley's Wrestling Federation of America closed its doors a year later, the promotion became the sole wrestling promotion in the state of New Hampshire. Although the promotion struggled financially during its first years, partly due to Despres' inexperience as a promoter, it eventually gained a small but loyal following in the Rochester area. The promotion not only established a home arena at the Rochester American Legion Hall but began touring cities throughout New Hampshire within two years. In the summer of 2006, they visited Claremont where it performed at a children's community center in Claremont Park. That same year, they co-promoted an event in Gardner, Massachusetts, with the Eastern Wrestling Alliance. It was one of FRW's first successful shows, with a record 175 fans in attendance.

It eventually took over the WFA's former home base in Dover, New Hampshire, as well. This change influenced one of the promotion's earliest storylines, which pitted one-time WFA stars, known as the Dover Legends, against "heel" manager The Grand Wizard of Wrestling and his Stable of Assassins. Among its earliest stars were former WFA mainstays such as "The Alpha Male" Justin Powers and Antonio "The Promise" Thomas as well as Northeastern independent stars including Maverick Wild, Chase Del Monte, Tommaso Ciampa, Brian Milonas, and Johnny Handsome. Handsome spent part of his early career in the promotion. FRW also developed a small women's division, largely dominated by Sarah Blackheart, Mistress Belmont and Vanity Vixxxen, and would come to include Sara Del Rey, Mercedes Martinez, Ariel, Alere Little Feather and Awesome Kong. Matt Calamare, the only working deaf referee in professional wrestling, also frequently appeared for the promotion.

In early 2007, the promotion was involved in a minor controversy with Rochester city officials when they suddenly shut down Rochester American Legion Hall a little over eight hours before the start of FRW's January 12 supercard "Friday the 12th". According to Despres, an estimated 90-150 fans were turned away. FRW was forced to offer a full refund for all the tickets purchased and was prohibited from running shows in the city until he was issued a special permit by the city council. He met with the council in May and again in November 2007 in order to promote shows in the town. Meanwhile, FRW continued to tour New Hampshire, returning to Claremont in the spring and looking into securing an alternate venue outside of Rochester. Eventually, Despres and the city came to a settlement allowing FRW the use of the Rochester American Legion Hall.

On June 23, 2007, FRW held its first card outside the New Hampshire area at the Memorial Ice Arena in Winchendon, Massachusetts. The main event featured a first-ever "champion vs. champion" match between FRW All Star Champion Kid Krazy and Granite State Champion Christian Angers. On February 8, 2008, Despres was a guest on the internet radio show Rumble Radio Online. On June 11, FRW was one of several New England independent promotions which participated in a special benefit show for Brandon Cusick, a 5-year-old child diagnosed with leukemia, at the Bank Street Armory in Fall River, Massachusetts. Seven months later in Rochester, on November 15, 2008, the FRW Tag Team Championship changed hands in a 6-person intergender match between The Pleasures of Pain & Mistress Belmont and Tony Star, Sethoran and Vanity Vixxxen. Also on the card, Shane Sharpe defeated Justin Shaype in a 2 out of 3 falls match to win the heavyweight championship.

On July 31, 2009, on the first night of his tour of the East Coast of the United States, Antonio Thomas defeated Shane Sharpe in an Iron Man match in Rochester. In addition to running shows in New Hampshire and Massachusetts, FRW made its Vermont debut in White River Junction on September 25. Tony Spencer, then FRW Granite State Champion, appeared on the October 10th edition of the internet call-in radio show Late Nite JengaJam. Among the topics he discussed included his thoughts on the death of Lou Albano, the state of the wrestling industry and World Wrestling Entertainment, and his own career in Front Row Wrestling. On November 6, 2009, Maverick Wild was forced to leave FRW after losing to Bruiser Costa at the American Legion in Rochester. Also on the card, Christian Angers & Stephen Marriott won the FRW Tag Team Championship from Shawn Sharp and Cameron Blaze, and Johnny Vegas defeated Sethoran to become the new FRW All Star Champion.

On February 26, 2010, Despres announced the promotion would be forming a partnership with NWA Liberty States, formerly No Limits Pro, to promote wrestling events throughout New England under the banner of the National Wrestling Alliance. Despres continued co-promoting NWA Liberty States with Joey Eastman for another year. The promotion was then taken over by Todd Sople, which left the NWA around this time, and relocated to Dracut, Massachusetts as Liberty States Pro Wrestling. In an October 2017 interview, Despres confirmed he would not bring back Front Row Wrestling due to his retirement and believed running an independent promotion in New England was no longer profitable.

== Alumni ==
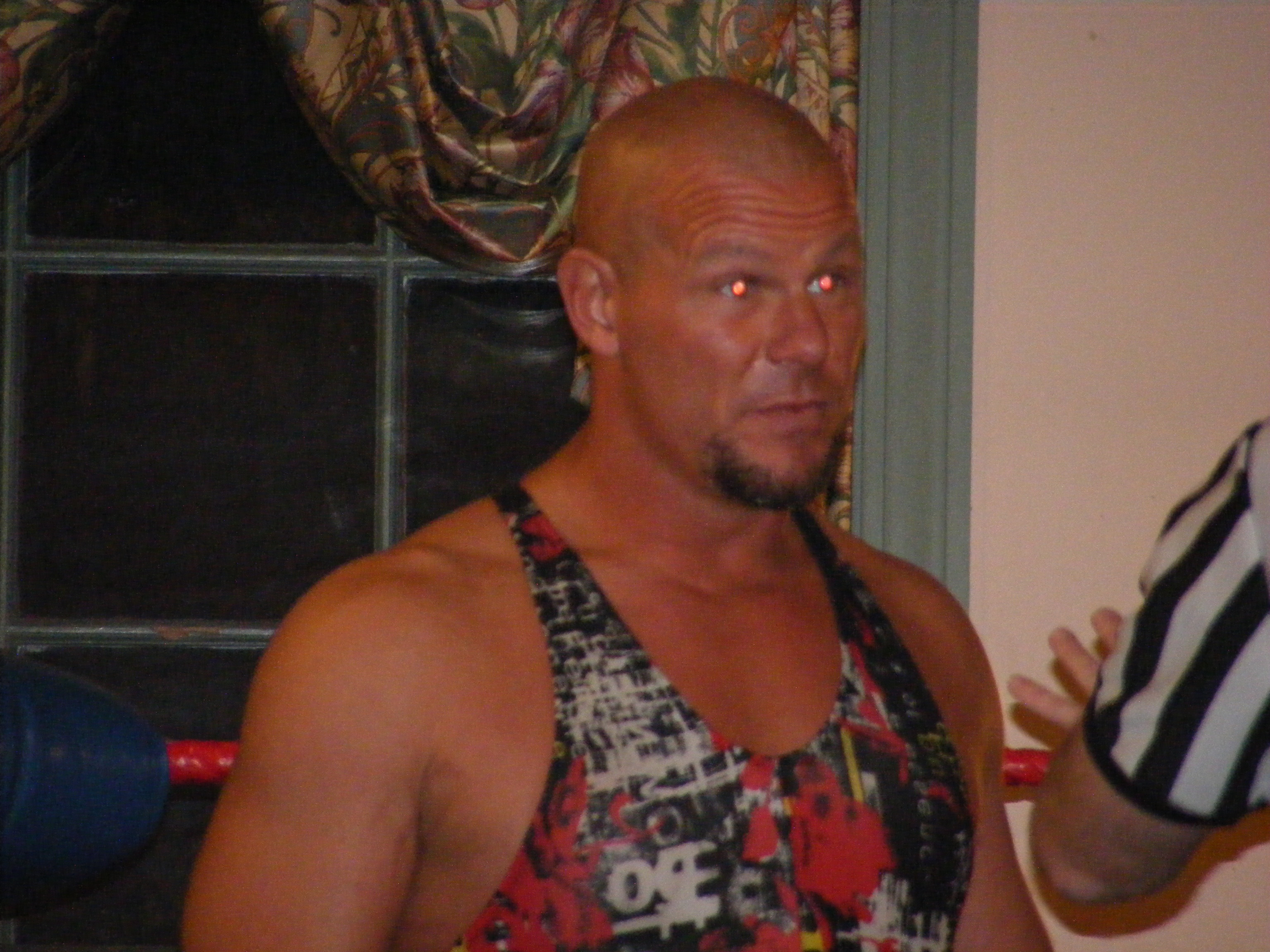
Maverick Wild

Johnny Punch

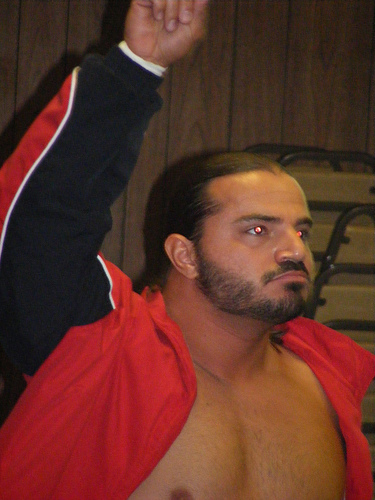
Alex Arion

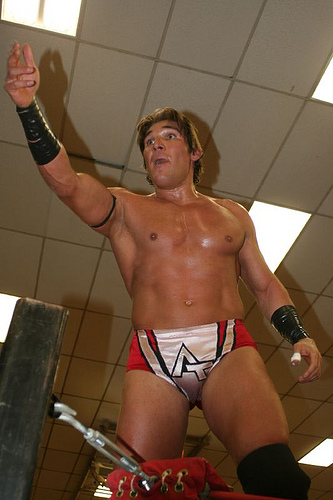
Antonio "The Promise" Thomas

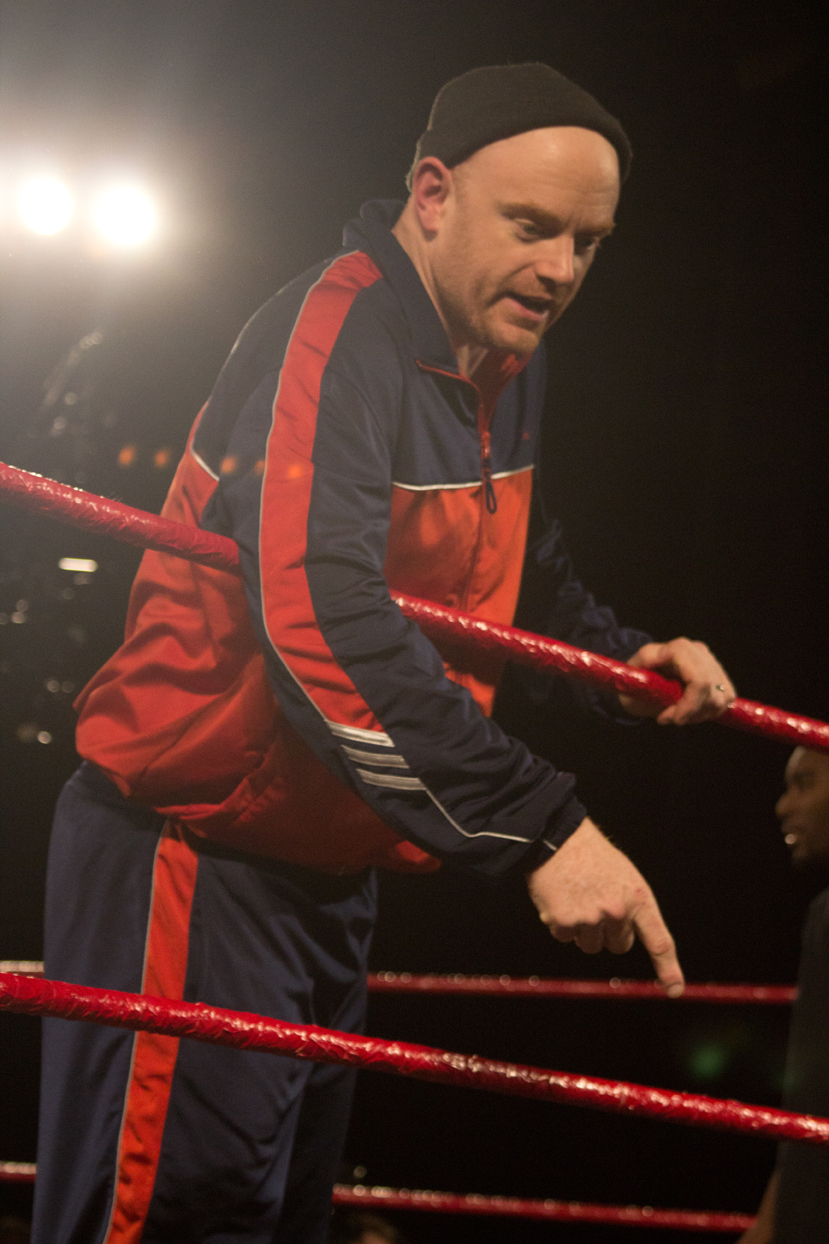
"Brutal" Bob Evans

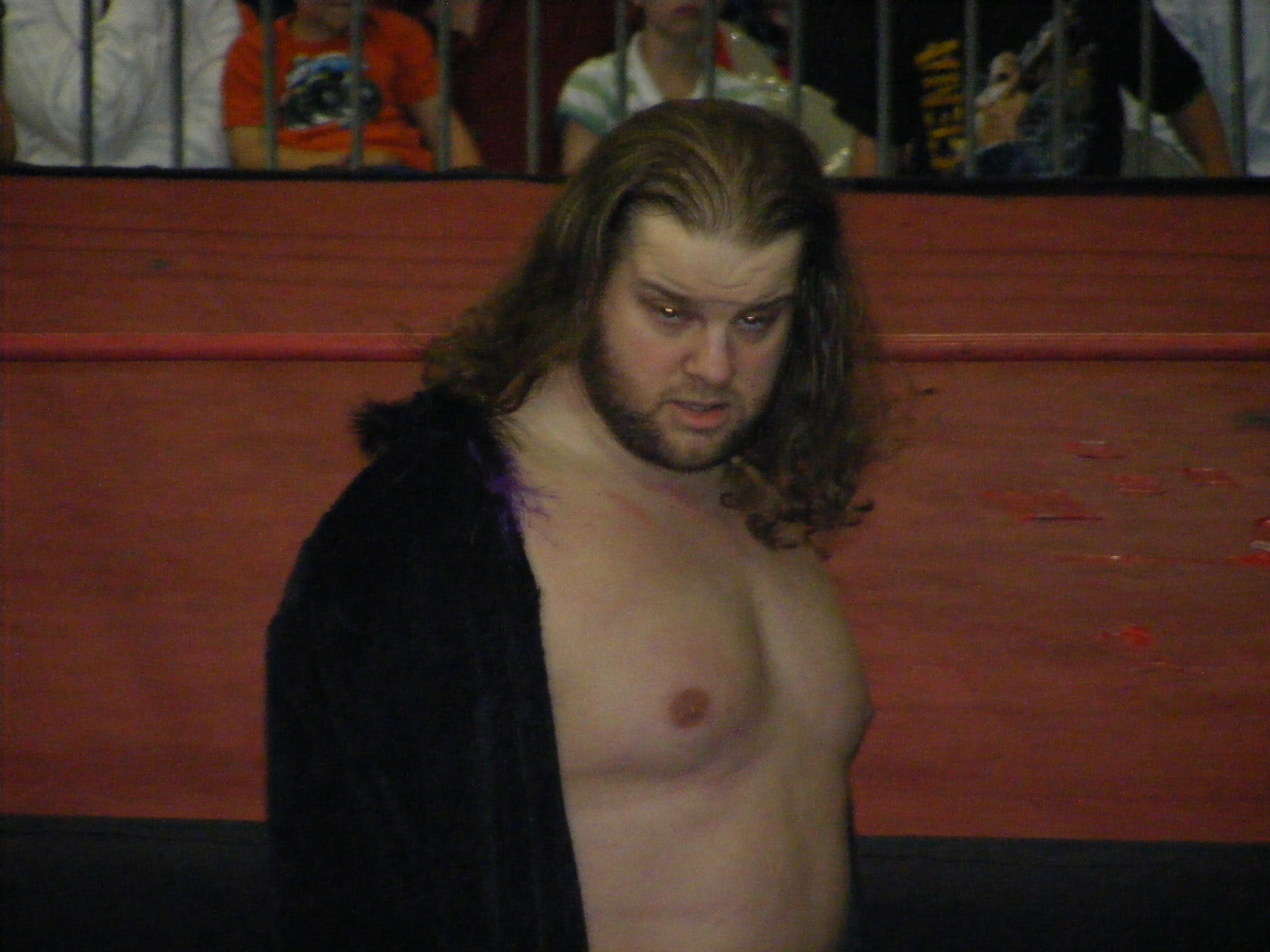
"The Duke of Elegance" Don Chesterfield

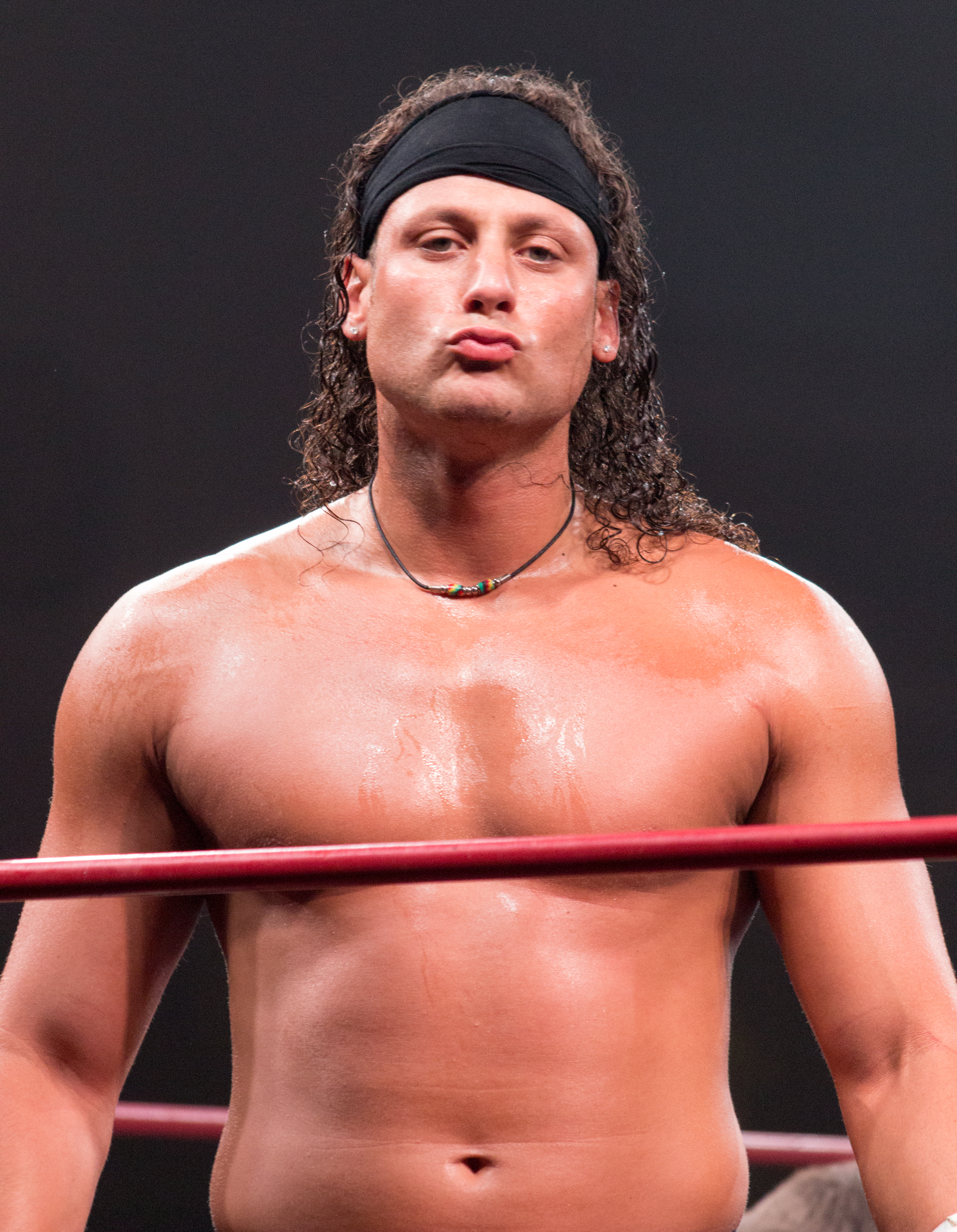
Matt Taven

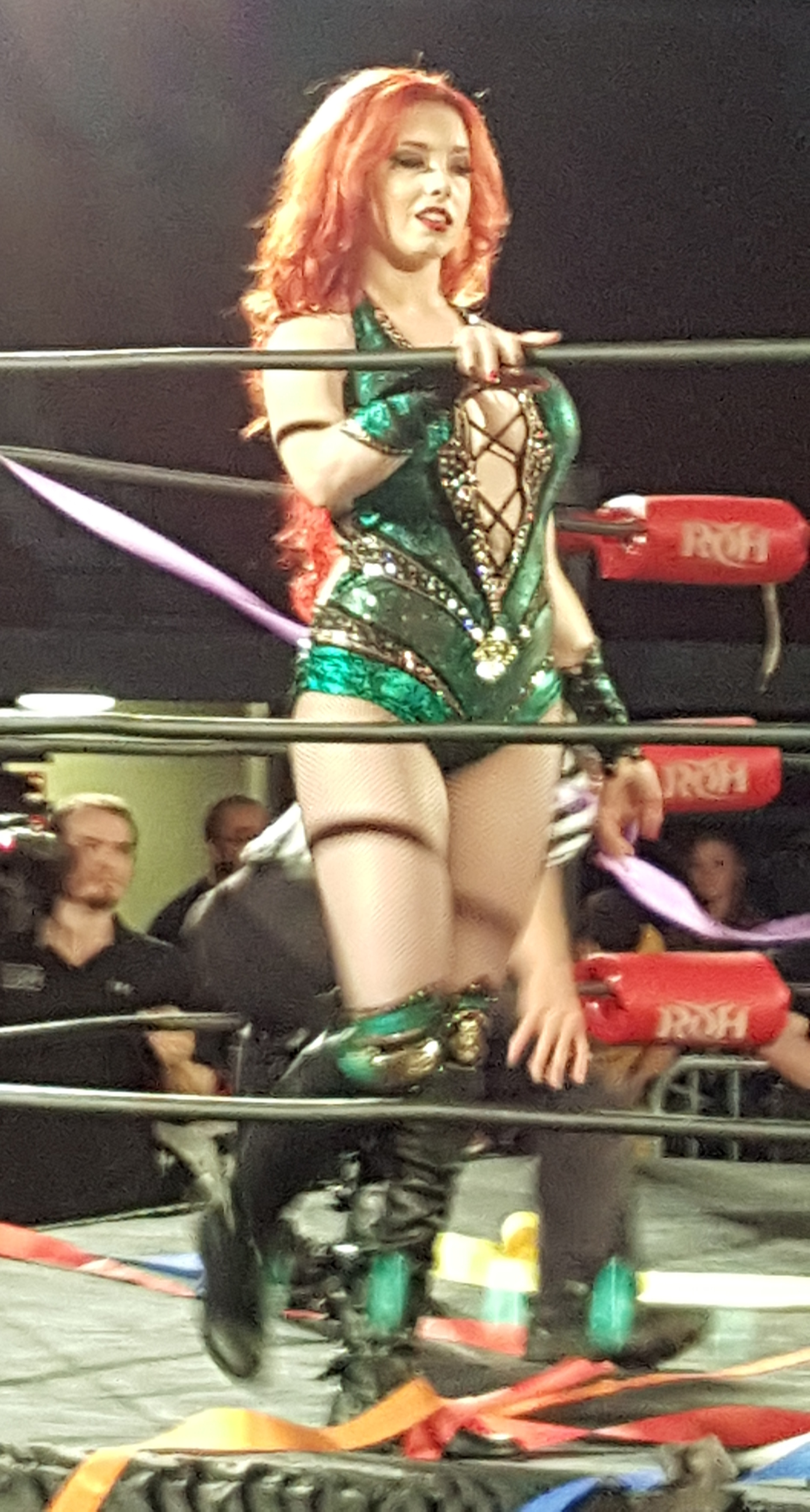
Taeler Hendrix

Male wrestlers

Birth name:	Ring name(s):	Tenure:	Notes
Richard Adorno	Punisher Don Vega	2008	
Jeremy Barron	Dr. Reginald Heresy / Dr. Heresy	2006-2009	
Jeff Costa	Bruiser Costa	2008-2010	
Tom Demers	Johnny Punch	2008	
Maverick Wild	Maverick Wild	2005-2010	
Robert Evans	Brutal Bob Evans	2006-2007; 2009	
Michael Gallagher	Mike Nice	2007-2008	
Jared Ganem	Paul Lombardi	2006	
Matthew Marinelli	Matt Taven	2010	
Thomas Matera	Antonio "The Promise" Thomas	2007-2010	
Tom McCormack Jr.	Tommy Mack	2006-2009	
Justin McIsaac	Justin Shaype	2007-2009	
Brian Milonas	Brian Milonas	2006-2007	
James Milonas	Jimmy James	2007	
Max Pelham	Max Impact	2006	
Corey Peloquin	Chi Chi Cruz	2006	
Alex Pliakos	Alex Arion	2006	
Joseph Puffer III	Christian Angers	2006-2010	
Francesco Roda	Frankie Arion	2008	
Todd Smith	Don Chesterfield	2007-2008	
David Tombari	Tony Omega	2006	
Sarath Ton	Kid Mikaze	2007-2008	
John Vitale	Johnny Vegas	2006-2010	
Tommaso Whitney	Thomaso Ciampa / Tommy Pennmanship	2006-2007	
Unknown	AJ Mulkie	2006	
Unknown	Alex Payne	2006	
Ciruolo, Antonio	The Alternate Warrior	2008	
Unknown	Arson	2007	
Unknown	B.A. Tatum	2009-2010	
Unknown	Billy King	2009-2010	
Unknown	Brandon Locke	2007	
Unknown	Bryan Logan	2006-2007	
Unknown	Cameron Blaze	2009-2010	
Unknown	Chase Del Monte	2006-2007	
Unknown	Dan Thunder	2007-2009	
Unknown	Dave Barron / DJ Dave / Moondog Barron	2006-2009	
Unknown	Ethan Masters	2008-2009	
Unknown	Flash Farenhyte / Master Flash Farenhyte	2006	
Unknown	Frankie Armadillo	2006-2007	
Unknown	Gary "The Torch" Kudalis	2007	
Hartford, Guthrie	Guthrie O'Dwyer	2007-2008	
Unknown	Hawaiian Hotbody Vain	2007	
DeSimone, Paul	Hawaiian Joe Simone	2009	
Unknown	John Magnus	2009	
Unknown	John Poe	2010	
Unknown	Johnny Royal	2009	
Unknown	Jonny Idol	2009-2010	
Unknown	JT Fox	2010	
Unknown	Justin Sharpe	2008	
Unknown	Kid Krazy	2006-2007	
Unknown	Kurt Adams	2007	
Unknown	Larry Huntley	2006-2007	
Unknown	Link	2008	
Unknown	Lynch 2.0	2008	
Unknown	Mad Dog Mulligan	2007	
Unknown	Master Flesh	2006-2009	
Unknown	Matt Logan	2006-2007	
Unknown	Matt Spectro / Tarzan Taylor	2007-2010	
Unknown	Michael Sain	2006	
Unknown	Morbid Malitia	2007	
Unknown	Nick Steel	2007	
Unknown	Panther Martin	2006-2010	
Unknown	Psycho	2006-2008	
Unknown	Rocco Abruzzi	2006	
Unknown	Scott Reed	2007	
Unknown	Sethoran / Vampire Sethoran	2007-2009	
Unknown	Shane Sharpe / Shane Sharp / Shayne Sharp / American Thunder	2007-2010	
Unknown	Shawn Sharp / Shawn Sharpe	2009-2010	
Unknown	Sonny Goodspeed / Strutting Sonny	2006-2010	
Unknown	Stretcher McGuirk	2008	
Unknown	Tim Walker	2006-2007	
Unknown	Todd Sopple / Todd Sople	2009-2010	
Unknown	Tom Kane	2007-2008	
Unknown	Tom Liddell	2007-2008	
Unknown	Tommy Boy	2008	
Unknown	Tony Star	2008-2009	
Ciruolo, Antonio	"Tough Talk" Tony Spencer	2007-2010	

Female wrestlers

Birth name:	Ring name(s):	Tenure:	Notes
Catherine Belmont	Mistress Belmont	2009-2010	
Taeler Conrad-Mellen	Taeler Hendrix	2010	
Alisha Inacio	Alexxis	2010	
Nicole Raczynski	Nikki Rox	2008	
Unknown	Kimaya	2009-2010	
Unknown	Sarah Blackheart	2009-2010	
Unknown	Vanity Vixxxen / Vanity Vixen	2008-2009	

Stables and tag teams

Tag team/Stable(s)	Members	Tenure(s)
The Apex	Cameron Blaze and Shawn Sharpe	2009-2010
The Boogie Woogie Express		2009
Chunky But Funky	DJ Dave and Strutting Sonny	2007-2008
Dr. Reginald Heresy and Christian Angers	Dr. Reginald Heresy and Christian Angers	2006-2008
The Logan Brothers	Bryan Logan and Matt Logan	2006-2007
The Marriott Corporation	Steven Marriott, Johnny Vegas & Justin Shaype, Max Impact	2006-2010
The Pleasures of Pain	Maverick Wild and Master Flesh	2007-2008
The Science of Insanity	Christian Angers and Steven Marriott	2009-2010
Technical Thunder	Tony Spencer and Dan Thunder	2008

Managers and valets

Birth name:	Ring name(s):	Tenure:	Notes
Catherine Belmont	Mistress Belmont	2007-2010	
Unknown	Dr. Everett Payne / Dr. Payne	2006–2007	
Unknown	George Romero / Jorge Romero / Jorge Akbar	2008-2010	
Unknown	Joey Eastman	2007-2010	
Unknown	Lexxus	2008	
Unknown	Marshall McNeil	2008-2010	
Unknown	Nurse Kiki Van Dyke	2006	
Unknown	Steven Mariott / Stephen Marriott	2006–2010	
Unknown	Vanity Vixxxen / Vanity Vixen	2007-2009	

== Championships ==
=== FRW All Star Championship ===
The FRW All Star Championship was the main professional wrestling championship defended in Front Row Wrestling. It was the original heavyweight title of the All-Star Wrestling Association from 2002 to 2005, and continued to be defended in FRW until the promotion merged with NWA Liberty States, the National Wrestling Alliance affiliate in Massachusetts, in February 2010.

Key
Symbol	Meaning
No.	The overall championship reign
Reign	The reign number for the specific wrestler listed.
Event	The event in which the championship changed hands
N/A	The specific information is not known
—	Used for vacated reigns in order to not count it as an official reign
(nlt)	Indicates that a title change took place "no later than" the date listed. (Note: Documentation of the specific date of a title change is not found but documentation of the champion holding the title on that date/in that period.)
	Indicates that there was a period where the lineage is undocumented due to the lack of written documentation

Title history

No.	Champion	Reign	Date	Days held	Location	Event	Notes	Ref(s).
1	Johnny Vegas	1	November 19, 2005	301	Claremont, New Hampshire	live event	As the last holder of the All-Star Wrestling Association Championship, Johnny Vegas was recognized as the first FRW All Star Champion.	
2	Maverick Wild	1	September 16, 2006	62	Gardner, Massachusetts	live event	This was an interpromotional "champion vs. champion" match co-hosted with the Eastern Wrestling Alliance. Maverick Wild won both the FRW All Star and EWA Heavyweight Titles.	
3	Kid Krazy	1	November 17, 2006	227	Rindge, New Hampshire	live event		
—	Vacated	—	July 2, 2007	—	N/A	N/A	Kid Krazy was stripped of the title for undocumented reasons	
4	Christian Angers	1	August 3, 2007	301	Rochester, New Hampshire	Ultimate Endurance	Defeated Don Chesterfield in an "Ultimate Endurance" tournament final	
5	Shane Sharpe	1	May 30, 2008	126	Rochester, New Hampshire	live event		
6	Justin Shaype	1	October 3, 2008	43	Rochester, New Hampshire	live event		
7	Shane Sharpe	2	November 15, 2008	174	Rochester, New Hampshire	live event	This was a two out of three falls match	
—	Vacated	—	May 8, 2009	—	Rochester, New Hampshire	live event	Held up when Shane Sharpe and Antonio Thomas struck a referee during their match. It was decided by the promotion to award the title to the winner of Ultimate Endurance 3.	
8	Sethoran	1	June 19, 2009	140	Rochester, New Hampshire	Ultimate Endurance 3	Defeated Master Flesh in an "Ultimate Endurance" match for the vacant title.	
9	Johnny Vegas	2	November 6, 2009	112	Rochester, New Hampshire	live event		
—	Deactivated	—	February 26, 2010	—	N/A	N/A	FRW merged with NWA Liberty States on February 26, 2010, and the title was abandoned.	

=== FRW Granite State Championship ===
The FRW Granite State Championship was a secondary professional wrestling championship defended in Front Row Wrestling. As its name suggests, the title was contested in matches specifically in the state of New Hampshire and existed from 2005 until present, despite FRW's merger with NWA Liberty States, the National Wrestling Alliance affiliate in Massachusetts, in 2010, Tough Talk Tony Spencer still defends this championship actively.

Key
Symbol	Meaning
No.	The overall championship reign
Reign	The reign number for the specific wrestler listed.
Event	The event in which the championship changed hands
N/A	The specific information is not known
—	Used for vacated reigns in order to not count it as an official reign
(nlt)	Indicates that a title change took place "no later than" the date listed. (Note: Documentation of the specific date of a title change is not found but documentation of the champion holding the title on that date/in that period.)
	Indicates that there was a period where the lineage is undocumented due to the lack of written documentation

Title history

No.	Champion	Reign	Date	Days held	Location	Event	Notes	Ref(s).
1	Dave Barron	1	May 20, 2006	119	Claremont, New Hampshire	live event	Barron became the first champion by winning the title in a battle royal.	
2	Flash Farenhyte	1	July 29, 2006	63	Keene, New Hampshire	live event		
3	Tim Walker	1	September 30, 2006	147	Claremont, New Hampshire	live event		
4	Christian Angers	1	February 24, 2007	83	Rindge, New Hampshire	live event		
5	Maverick Wild	1	May 18, 2007	77	Rochester, New Hampshire	live event		
6	Shayne Sharpe	1	August 3, 2007	175	Rochester, New Hampshire	live event		
7	Steven Marriott	1	January 25, 2008	49	Rochester, New Hampshire	live event		
8	Tommy Mack	1	March 14, 2008	127	Rochester, New Hampshire	live event		
9	Matt Spectro	1	July 19, 2008	293	Rochester, New Hampshire	Ultimate Endurance 2	Defeated Tommy Mack in an "Ultimate Endurance" tournament in which the title was on the line.	
10	Tony Star	1	May 8, 2009	148	Rochester, New Hampshire	live event		
11	Tony Spencer	1	October 3, 2009	146	Rochester, New Hampshire	live event		
—	Deactivated	—	February 26, 2010	—	N/A	N/A	FRW merged with NWA Liberty States on February 26, 2010, however, Tough Talk Tony Spencer does defend the championship regularly and is recognized as the longest reigning champion in New Hampshire.	

=== FRW Tag Team Championship ===
The FRW Tag Team Championship was the major tag team title in Front Row Wrestling from 2005 until 2010. As former holders of the All-Star Wrestling Association Tag Team Championship, albeit with separate partners, Dr. Reginald Heresy and Christian Angers were introduced as the inaugural tag team champions in late 2005. The title existed until FRW's merger with NWA Liberty States, the National Wrestling Alliance affiliate in Massachusetts, in 2010.

Title history

Key
No.	Overall reign number
Reign	Reign number for the specific team—reign numbers for the individuals are in parentheses, if different
Days	Number of days held

No.	Champion	Championship change			Reign statistics		Notes	Ref.
No.	Champion	Date	Event	Location	Reign	Days	Notes	Ref.
1	Dr. Reginald Heresy and Christian Angers	2005 (n)	live event	Unknown	1	N/A	Heresy and Angers were introduced as the first tag team champions	
2	Tim Walker and Tommy Mack	April 8, 2006	live event	Claremont, New Hampshire	1	0	This was a no disqualification match. Tommy Mack suffers a serious head injury during the match, however, and is unable to compete for several months.	
3	Dr. Reginald Heresy and Christian Angers	April 8, 2006	live event	Claremont, New Hampshire	2	112	Due to Tommy Mack's injury, the titles were returned to Heresy and Angers.	
4	Tommy Mack and Panther Martin	July 29, 2006	live event	Keene, New Hampshire	1	111		
5	The Logan Brothers (Matt Logan and Bryan Logan)	November 17, 2006	live event	Rindge, New Hampshire	1	130		
6	Tommy Mack and Panther Martin	March 27, 2007	live event	Rochester, New Hampshire	2	94		
7	The Marriott Corporation (Johnny Vegas and Justin Shaype)	June 29, 2007	live event	Rochester, New Hampshire	1	141		
8	Chunky But Funky (DJ Dave and Strutting Sonny)	November 17, 2007	live event	Rochester, New Hampshire	1	118		
9	Pleasures of Pain (Maverick Wild and Master Flesh)	March 14, 2008	live event	Rochester, New Hampshire	1	246		
10	Sethoran and Tony Star	November 15, 2008	live event	Rochester, New Hampshire	1	97		
11	Dr. Reginald Heresy and Johnny Vegas	February 20, 2009	live event	Rindge, New Hampshire	1	161		
12	Shawn Sharp and Cameron Blaze	July 31, 2009	live event	Rochester, New Hampshire	1	98		
13	Christian Angers and Steven Marriott	November 6, 2009	live event	Rochester, New Hampshire	1	112		
—	Deactivated	February 26, 2010	—	—	—	—	FRW merged with NWA Liberty States on February 26, 2010, and the title was abandoned.	

=== FRW Ladies All Star Championship ===
The FRW Ladies All Star Championship was a short-lived women's professional wrestling title in Front Row Wrestling, which was defended for less than a year before the promotion merged with NWA Liberty States, the National Wrestling Alliance affiliate in Massachusetts, in February 2010.

Key
Symbol	Meaning
No.	The overall championship reign
Reign	The reign number for the specific wrestler listed.
Event	The event in which the championship changed hands
N/A	The specific information is not known
—	Used for vacated reigns in order to not count it as an official reign
(nlt)	Indicates that a title change took place "no later than" the date listed. (Note: Documentation of the specific date of a title change is not found but documentation of the champion holding the title on that date/in that period.)
	Indicates that there was a period where the lineage is undocumented due to the lack of written documentation

Title history

No.	Champion	Reign	Date	Days held	Location	Event	Notes	Ref(s).
1	Mistress Belmont	1	July 31, 2009	210	Rochester, New Hampshire	live event	Defeated Vanity Vixen and Kimaya in a three-way match to become the first FRW All Star Ladies Champion.	
—	Vacated	—	February 26, 2010	—	N/A	N/A	FRW merged with NWA Liberty States on February 26, 2010, and the title was abandoned.	
