= NWA Shockwave =

Professional wrestling promotion

- Acronym: NWA-SW
- Founded: 2001; 25 years ago
- Style: American Wrestling
- Headquarters: Staten Island, New York
- Founder: Billy Firehawk
- Owner(s): Daisy Firehawk (2001-2006); Derek Gordon (2006-2007)
- Parent: National Wrestling Alliance
- Formerly: CyberSpace Wrestling Federation (2001-2005); NWA: Cyberspace (2005-2006)

NWA Shockwave (NWA-SW, formerly known as CyberSpace Wrestling Federation and NWA: Cyberspace) was a professional wrestling promotion that was founded by Billy Firehawk in Staten Island, New York in 2001, and later relocated to Wayne, New Jersey. It was the earliest promotion to bring in major stars to Central New Jersey, many being seen in live events for the first time, and attracted a loyal following for its traditional "family friendly" style of wrestling. It was the single major promotion of this type to run New Jersey, other rival promotions favoring hardcore-style wrestling, and was at one time considered the top promotion in the region along with Jersey All Pro Wrestling.

The company was known for its early use of the internet to promote itself, and was the earliest known wrestling organization to broadcast its events on a regular webcast; their show, "Shockwave TV", aired on ITV until 2005. After Firehawk's death in 2006, control of the company fell to Derek Gordon, who ran the company until its close the following year.

The promotion had a working relationship with Total Nonstop Action Wrestling, helped by Firehawk's friendship with Mike Tenay, which allowed it to feature TNA stars, storylines and sanction title defenses of the NWA World Heavyweight Championship. Among the number of then current and future stars who spent time in the promotion included Abyss, Amazing Red, A.J. Styles, Michael Shane, Christopher Daniels, C.M. Punk, D'Lo Brown, Julio Dinero, Sonjay Dutt, Kip James, Frankie Kazarian, Jeff Jarrett, Ron Killings, Jay Lethal, Bobby Roode, Shark Boy, Elix Skipper, Petey Williams, America's Most Wanted (Chris Harris & James Storm), The Naturals (Andy Douglas & Chase Stevens) and The S.A.T. (Jose & Joel Maximo).

Many former stars from Extreme Championship Wrestling and World Championship Wrestling also appeared for the promotion; Chris Candido and Tammy Lynn Sytch, Danny Doring, Chris Hamrick, E. Z. Money, Jerry Lynn, Rodney Mack and Rhino from ECW and Crowbar, Kanyon, Diamond Dallas Page, Lex Luger and Vince Russo from WCW. Both Tammy Lynn Sytch and Vince Russo "retired" at NWA Cyberspace shows. Several independent wrestlers also competed in the promotion during their early careers such as Gran Akuma, Slyck Wagner Brown, Mike Kruel, The Smoke, "The Alpha Male" Justin Powers, Rob Eckos and Xavier. Chikara's Mike Quackenbush and World Xtreme Wrestling's The Hungarian Barbarian and Mana the Polynesian Warrior were also regulars. Brown has claimed that NWA Cyberspace/Shockwave was his favorite promotion to work for.

Upon joining the National Wrestling Alliance in 2005, the promotion became known as NWA: Cyberspace and then NWA Shockwave. It was affiliated with several other regional NWA promotions in the Northeastern United States, specifically NWA New Jersey/New York, NWA North Jersey and NWA Upstate, as well as having a working relationship with Mikey Whipwreck's New York Wrestling Connection. Several of his students wrestled in the promotion Ken Scampi, Mike Spinelli, Mason Raige, Quiet Storm, Tara Charisma and Trinity.

The promotion boasted an impressive roster of female wrestlers as well. Among them included Alexis Laree, April Hunter, Tracy Brooks, Cindy Rogers, Jazz, Lacey, Nikki Roxx, O.D.B, Serena, Sumie Sakai, Talia Madison and managers Alere Little Feather and Jade Chung. Jasmin St. Claire, former co-owner of Pro Pain Pro Wrestling (3PW) with then boyfriend The Blue Meanie, also served as its commissioner until its close.

== History ==
=== CyberSpace Wrestling Federation ===
Billy Firehawk, a semi-retired Canadian-born wrestler, founded the CyberSpace Wrestling Federation in Staten Island, New York in 2001. His wife Daisy was the principal owner of the promotion while Firehawk took care of the general running of the company. Booking duties and talent scouting went to David Levy, who was also a wrestler on the roster. Firehawk and David Levy put together the foundation & groundwork for what the CSWF & NWA Cyberspace would become. In October 2002, Firehawk began promoting wrestling shows in Central New Jersey and, on October 19, the promotion crowned its first heavyweight champion when Smokey M defeated Danny Doring, Kidd USA and Sinister X in a 4 Way Dance at its at "Halloween Horror '02" show in Flemington, New Jersey; also appearing on the show were independent wrestlers Brian Fury, Don Montoya, Mike Quackenbush and Gran Akuma. Three months later at "Legendary Breakout", the heavyweight title was unified with the USWF Heavyweight Championship after the New York-based United States Wrestling Federation folded. Firehawk and many other mainstays had previously competed in the USWF during the last decade.

Firehawk was able to bring in stars from World Championship Wrestling following its close the previous year, due in part to his friendship with WCW announcer Mike Tenay, as well as from Total Nonstop Action Wrestling. David Levy scouted and brought in top indy talent to mix with the established veterans. Some would even go on to WWE careers like Matt Striker, Antonio Thomas, Mickie James, and others. During its five-year existence, TNA's Ron Killings, Jeff Jarrett, Chris Harris, Abyss and Bobby Roode would all hold the heavyweight title while America's Most Wanted (Chris Harris & James Storm), the United Nations (Prince Nana & Sonjay Dutt) and The S.A.T. (Jose & Joel Maximo) held the tag team titles. For many of these wrestlers, it was the first time they would appear in live events in New Jersey. The promotion's skillful utilization of the internet to promote itself soon made the CSWF one of the most visible on the East Coast.

In early-2003, the promotion established a women's division and brought in many of the top female wrestlers on the indy circuit at the time. On January 25, Alexis Laree defeated Serena and April Hunter in a 3 Way Dance at Flemington's HealthQuest of Hunterdon to become the first CSWF Women's Champion. Also on the card included former Extreme Championship Wrestling wrestlers Chris Hamrick and E. Z. Money, and independent wrestlers Mike Quackenbush, Crowbar and Slyk Wagner Brown. These were eventually followed by Ariel, Tracy Brooks, Cindy Rogers, Lacey, Nikki Roxx, O.D.B, Sumie Sakai and Talia Madison. On July 12, Laree walked out during a CSWF show in Rahway before a match against Simply Luscious. She subsequently left the promotion over a contract dispute and the title remained vacant for two months before being won by Trinity on September 13. Like Laree, Trinity also left the promotion and publicly criticized Firehawk while a guest on the Masked Maniac Hotline. Following the debut of Jazz, a former WWE Women's Champion, she and April Hunter would feud over the promotion's women's title over a year later.

Firehawk's relationship with TNA allowed the promotion to not only use TNA wrestlers but also have some of its storylines be played out in the CSWF such as the continuation of the feud between Triple X and America's Most Wanted. It also sanctioned title defences of the TNA World Heavyweight Championship. On the July 12th show in Rahway, Mike Tenay and Crowbar were in Ron Killings' corner when he took on Homicide. Tenay would eventually become a "heel" manager and de facto leader of the growing TNA faction within the promotion. By the end of the year, Larry Zbyszko, D-Lo Brown, Shark Boy, Michael Shane and America's Most Wanted (Chris Harris & James Storm) were also competing for the CSWF.

The high costs of running shows with such high-profile stars, however, took its toll on the company during its first year. Among the more serious issues were that the small crowds they were bringing in were not enough to justify running highly expensive shows as was Firehawk's tendency to overpay its talent.

On April 24, 2004, the CSWF ran against rival promotions Jersey All Pro and Jersey City Wrestling in Wayne, New Jersey. The main event was a rare interpromotional match between TNA's Ron Killings and WWE's Al Snow for the CSWF Heavyweight Championship as well as appearances by Mike Tenay and Roddy Piper. JAPW's show featured Vader and Mike Awesome while JCW had Kamala, Chris Candido and Bam Bam Bigelow. Diamond Dallas Page and Kanyon, both ex-WCW stars, headlined another show in Wayne on August 28. On October 30, 2004, Vince Russo appeared as leader of "Team TNA" and fired Julio Dinero and Miss Michelle from the group. He also threatened to fire Crowbar if he lost his match against Abyss which he did. Lex Luger also wrestled on the show, defeating Danny Jaxx, and later brawled with Ron Killings following his match with Matt Striker. Luger cut a bizarre promo on "Shockwave TV" in which he delivered a rant against both Killings and Firehawk prior to his appearance at the upcoming "Superbrawl Saturday" show. This interview has become widely popular on YouTube and social networking sites such as Facebook and MySpace.

Luger was scheduled wrestle in a 6-man tag team match with The Youngbludz (Matt Striker and Nick Berk) against Ron Killings & America's Most Wanted at CSWF's "Fatal Attraction" on January 8, 2005, however, he suffered a back injury in preparation for his match and was instead replaced by then NWA World Heavyweight Champion Jeff Jarrett. Sonjay Dutt won the NWA Cyberspace Cruiser-X Championship from Grim Reefer via forfeit. The event also marked the final appearance of Vince Russo, who announced his retirement from the wrestling industry. Jarrett also filled in for Luger in his bout against Ron Killings at "Superbrawl Saturday III" a month later.

=== NWA: Cyberspace ===
On that same day, during "Superbrawl Saturday III", Billy Firehawk announced that the promotion had officially joined the National Wrestling Alliance and was being renamed NWA: Cyberspace. The previous year, Firehawk had been approached by NWA President Bill Behrens about becoming an NWA affiliate. Although they ran shows in New Jersey, the promotion was still officially based in New York and were not allowed to join under the organization's rules. Behrens then helped Firehawk acquire the rights to use the NWA New Jersey name from promoter Fred Rubenstein. This caused some controversy with Gino Moore and Joe Panzarino, two other promoters who also claimed ownership of NWA New Jersey, and resulted in Moore suing Rubenstein in court. Rubenstein would eventually join the promotion, appearing on camera as a referee, and later became its chief operating officer.

By this time, the promotion was arguably considered one of the two top promotions in the New Jersey area, the other being Jersey All Pro Wrestling. In March, Josh Daniels defeated Mike Tobin to win the NWA Cyberspace Internet Title in Wayne, New Jersey. Frankie Kazarian wrestled his final match in NWA Cyberspace before going to World Wrestling Entertainment. After a near lengthy revamping of their website, the CSWF began broadcasting full events via its "Shockwave TV" webcast on March 25, 2005. A day later, it held another major show which saw Slyck Wagner Brown defended the NWA CyberSpace Championship against the former champion Ron Killings, Abyss and Mana the Polynesian Warrior in a dog collar match and a match between Triple X and America's Most Wanted. Jarrett would continue to defend his NWA title in the promotion, including "champion vs. champion" bouts against then CSWF Heavyweight Champion Slyk Wagner Brown, until losing the title in TNA to A.J. Styles on April 21. Nine days later, Jarrett defeated Slyk Wagner Brown for the CSWF Heavyweight title at "Retribution" on April 30. Despite losing the title, Brown continued to be one of the top stars in the promotion over the next year. Other stars who wrestled for NWA Cyberspace that year included Mike Kruel, Rodney Mack, Abyss and Petey Williams.

However, the promotion was a subject of controversy throughout much of 2005 and early-2006. Many of these originated with Frank Goodman, a rival New Jersey promoter, and his Masked Maniac Hotline. Firehawk's on-screen role in the company was openly criticized as were his promotion's questionable business decisions and practices. Former Women's Champion Talia had criticized the promotion as a guest the previous year, and a falling out with former employees Dave Levy and Eric Nyenhuis resulted in them speaking out against the company as well. As a guest on the Masked Maniac Hotline, Nyenhuis claimed that Firehawk had physically threatened him and, on one occasion, told him he was "going to cut his fucking legs off" prior to his firing. NWA Cyberspace's relationship with TNA was supposedly threatened due to difficulties with Jeff Jarrett and Jeremy Borash after booker Derek Gordon was alleged to have written storylines conflicting with TNA angles. Jarrett supposedly received a bounced check from Firehawk as well. There were also claims of "scaling back" on big name talent and that the promotion was losing around $10,000 a show.

In spite of this, the promotion held its most successful show that year when over 400 fans attended "Superbrawl Saturday IV" in Kearny, New Jersey, on January 21, 2006. A minor disturbance occurred at the show when Wayne Ploghofft, an employee of National Wrestling Superstars, was accused of attempting to take away objects he deemed as "weapons" from fans waiting to enter the building and forcibly eject others from attending the show. When Firehawk and other officials heard what was happening, Firehawk left the building with security members to confront Ploghofft but found he had left before their arrival.

In early-2006, the promotion also began to co-promote events with Mikey Whipwreck's New York City Wrestling Connection. In March, Bobby Roode won the NWA Cyberspace Internet Championship from Josh Daniels at one of these shows in Deer Park, New York. Several of Whipwreck's students, including Ken Scampi, Mike Spinelli, Mason Raige, Quiet Storm, Tara Charisma and Trinity, had been regulars in the promotion since its early years.

On March 26, 2006, the promotion held its "Disturbing The Peace" supercard at the former home arena of Jersey City Wrestling, the Boys & Girls Club, in Garfield, New Jersey. The May 21st edition of "Shockwave TV" in Flemington saw Tammy Lynn Sytch forced to leave the promotion when Kip James lost a "Loser's Manager Retires" match to Rhino with manager John Shane.

=== NWA Shockwave ===
NWA Cyberspace changed its name to NWA Shockwave on June 6, 2006, to reflect its Internet show, the aforementioned "Shockwave TV." Less than six weeks later, Billy Firehawk died on July 17, 2006, due to complications stemming from diabetes. He was 40 years old. Following the death of Firehawk, principle management of the federation was given to Derek Gordon, the former WCW producer and director of operations of NWA Shockwave. Gordon had been usually credited for the content driven plotlines of the federation over the year. The promotion went on a brief hiatus that summer. Upon its return, it promised new and unique storylines as well as bringing in fresh talent from other NWA affiliates in the United States and the United Kingdom.

At the end of the year, The S.A.T.'s left the promotion and took the titles with them to Tod Gordon's Pro Wrestling Unplugged. Stripped of the championship, the belts were discontinued when the promotion went on a brief hiatus starting on December 1, 2006. The Cruiser X and Women's titles were similarly scrapped. On January 13, 2007, Gordon held "NWA Shockwave: A New Beginning" at the sold-out Elks Lodge in Boonton, New Jersey. Serving as a memorial show for Firehawk, the show brought back regulars such as Mike Tobin, Bobby Fish, Rob Eckos, Ken Scampi, Cindy Rogers and others. Havok won a Gauntlet Match defeating Devon Storm, Sinister X, Paul E. Normous, Boogalu Washington, Cindy Rogers and Slyk Wagner Brown to win the vacant NWA Shockwave Heavyweight Championship. Papadon beat Grim Reefer, Mike Tobin and Josh Daniels in a 4 Way Dance for the NWA Shockwave Internet title.

Four months later, it was announced that NWA Shockwave and NWA Pro East would co-promote the NWA's first national television taping on the East Coast to be held at the Italian-American Family Association in Clifton, New Jersey, on April 28. The show featured Crowbar, Damian Dragon, the Devil's Rejects (Paul E Normus & Sinister X) and NWA Shockwave Heavyweight Champion Havoc. Havoc and NWA Shockwave Internet Champion Pappadon defended their titles a May 5 NWA Pro East-Bodyslam Wrestling Organization show at the Knights of Columbus Hall in Lodi. The promotion also signed an exclusive contract with the American Legion Hall to tour the Jersey Shore and included holding its inaugural “Beach Blanket Bodyslam” supercard. Havoc defended his heavyweight title on NWA Pro East cards for two months until losing the belt to Papadon in Clifton on June 2, 2007. The match was a 3 Way Dance involving then Internet Champion Josh Daniels and saw Papadon defeat each man in a best of three falls to win both titles. This was the last recorded title defence of the heavyweight championship and the promotion quietly closed down shortly afterwards.

== Roster ==
=== Alumni ===
- Abyss
- A.J. Styles
- Amazing Red
- Andrew Anderson
- Dan Barry
- Matt Bentley
- Nick Berk
- D'Lo Brown
- Slyck Wagner Brown
- Chris Candido
- Christopher Daniels
- C.M. Punk
- Crowbar
- Josh Daniels
- Julio Dinero
- Danny Doring
- Sonjay Dutt
- Rob Eckos
- Gran Akuma
- Grim Reefer
- Chris Hamrick
- Chris Harris
- Havok
- The Hungarian Barbarian
- Kip James
- Jeff Jarrett
- Kanyon
- Frankie Kazarian
- Ron Killings
- Mike Kruel
- Jay Lethal
- David Levy
- Lex Luger
- Jerry Lynn
- Rodney Mack
- E. Z. Money
- Diamond Dallas Page
- Justin Powers
- Mike Quackenbush
- Maniac Mark Chen
- Rhino
- Bobby Roode
- Vince Russo
- Ken Scampi
- Shark Boy
- Sinister X
- Elix Skipper
- The Smoke
- James Storm
- Petey Williams
- Xavier
- All Money Is Legal (K-Murda and Kid Pusha)
- America's Most Wanted (Chris Harris & James Storm)
- The Naturals (Andy Douglas & Chase Stevens)
- The S.A.T. (Jose & Joel Maximo)
- The Solution (Havok & Papadon)
- The Thrillogy (Kid Mikaze & Camaro)
- United Nations (Prince Nana & Sonjay Dutt)

=== Cyber Babes ===
- Ariel
- Tracy Brooks
- Tara Charisma
- Jade Chung
- April Hunter
- Jazz
- Lacey
- Alexis Laree
- Talia Madison
- Miss Michelle
- Mistress Asia
- O.D.B
- Cindy Rogers
- Nikki Roxx
- Sumie Sakai
- Serena
- Jasmin St. Claire
- Tammy Lynn Sytch
- Trinity

== Championships ==
| Championship | Notes |
|---|---|
| NWA Shockwave Heavyweight Championship | The heavyweight title of NWA Shockwave. It was established in 2002 and continued to be defended within the promotion until 2007. The title was also defended within NWA Pro during mid-2007. |
| NWA Shockwave Tag Team Championship | The tag team title of NWA Shockwave. It was established in 2002 under the CyberSpace Wrestling Federation and continued to be defended until 2006. |
| NWA Shockwave Internet Championship | The title was established in 2002 under the CyberSpace Wrestling Federation and continued to be defended until 2007. |
| CSWF Hardcore Championship | The title was established in 2002 under the CyberSpace Wrestling Federation held by “Acehole” Jackie Black and defended through the end of 2003. |
| NWA Shockwave Cruiser X Championship | The cruiserweight title of NWA Shockwave. The title was established in 2002 under the CyberSpace Wrestling Federation and, as a National Wrestling Alliance affiliate, was defended as part of the NWA's "X Division" until 2006. |
| NWA Shockwave Women's Championship | The title was established in 2003 under CyberSpace Wrestling Federation and was defended within NWA Shockwave until 2006. |

== See also ==
- List of National Wrestling Alliance territories
- List of independent wrestling promotions in the United States
