= Mason Raige =

American professional wrestler (born 1972)

Personal information
- Born: May 1, 1972 (age 54) Farmingville, New York, U.S.
- Website: MasonRaige.com

Professional wrestling career
- Ring name: Mason Raige
- Billed height: 6 ft 4 in (1.93 m)
- Billed weight: 257 lb (117 kg)
- Billed from: None of Your Damn Business
- Trained by: John Curse; Mike Mayhem; Mikey Whipwreck
- Debut: June 2003

Mason Raige is an American professional wrestler who currently competes in North American independent promotions including Mikey Whipwreck's New York Wrestling Connection as well as WWE developmental territories Ohio Valley Wrestling, Derby City Wrestling and Ohio Championship Wrestling.

He has also appeared in World Wrestling Entertainment as an on-camera personality in early 2007, most notably as one of The Undertaker's druids at WrestleMania 23 as well appearing on Monday Night Raw as one of Vince McMahon's personal security guards.

== Career ==
=== Early life and career ===
As a child growing up in Farmingville, New York, Raige was a fan of Hulk Hogan during the "rock 'n wrestling connection"-era often watching WWF Superstars of Wrestling and WWF Wrestling Challenge as well as attending events at Nassau Coliseum during the 1980s. He graduated from the State University of New York at Oswego with a degree in communications studies and philosophy in 1994 and began teaching English and journalism in Smithtown High School.

During this time, after watching MTV's Tough Enough series, Raige became interested in a career in professional wrestling and began training at the now-defunct Critical Mass Pro Wrestling in Hicksville, Long Island on January 7, 2003. Training with Team Taz graduate John Curse, Mike Mayhem and Mikey Whipwreck among others, he began wrestling in the New York area with NWA Cyberspace and the New York Wrestling Connection during the next two years. In November 2004, he wrestled on the first MXW Pro Wrestling show.

After appearing on the cover of Newsday on an article for the Hicksville wrestling school, he left his teaching job and began wrestling full-time. He later started teaming with Dickie Rodz as Rodz N' Rage and eventually defeated Wayne & Tyler Payne for the NYWC Tag Team Championship on January 29, 2005.

=== New York Wrestling Connection ===
After being seen by World Wrestling Entertainment road agents at an NYWC event, he was invited to a WWE tryout match in February 2005 and was later offered to join Ohio Valley Wrestling as part of the WWE developmental program. Moving to Louisville, Kentucky, he would split his time between New York and OVW, he and Dickie Rodz retained the NYWC Tag Team titles despite losing to Brett Matthews & Brian Myers and, at an NWA Cyberspace that same night, defeated Supreme Lee Great and Thrillology on March 26, 2005.

One of over 30 wrestlers attending an OVW/WWE tryout camp headed by Jim Cornette, Danny Davis, Tom Prichard and Rip Rogers between April 15–17, he and Dickie Rodz defeated Grim Reefer and James Newblood on April 29 although he and Rodz would be defeated in a tag team tournament losing to Matt Striker & Joey Braggiol in the semi-finals the following night. That same day, he would drive from New York to New Jersey to defeat Prince Nana at the NWA Cyberspace Retribution '99 supercard.

Facing Brett Matthews & Brian Myers in several matches during the next several weeks, although retaining the tag team titles via disqualification on May 21, he and Rodz would finally lose the titles to Brett Matthews & Brian Myers on June 4, 2005. Several weeks later, after a tag team match between against Danny & Billy Angus ended in a no contest, Raige would have to be escorted from the building by security on June 25. The following month, Raige made his first appearance on WWE television as a security guard during a brawl between Edge and Matt Hardy at the Continental Airlines Arena in East Rutherford, New Jersey on July 11.

With Dickie Rodz and Crusher Doogan, Raige lost to Plazma & Team 3-D in a 6-man tag team match on September 23, he would wrestle twice in one night defeating Stockade and in the main event with Dickie Rodz lost to Matt Hyson and Mike Mondo on October 8. On October 29, after defeating The Solution by countout in a handicap match, Dickie Rodz turned on Raige attacking him with a steel chair resulting in a severe head would requiring 12 stitches.

Feuding with Dickie Rodz and The Solution throughout late 2005, Raige was at one point suspended from the promotion by NYWC Commissioner Mikey Whipwreck and later defeated Dan Dynasty in a particularly violent match on December 17, 2005. Following the match, Raige powerbombed Dynasty on a bed of barbed-wire.

=== Ohio Valley Wrestling ===
Making his debut on Ohio Valley Wrestling, he teamed with J-Mann and The Ogre in a 6-man tag team match losing to Chet the Jet and The Riggs Brothers on January 21 and, the following night, teamed with Vick Devine to defeat Pat Buck and Ogre. Several days later at an NYWC event, Raige teamed with Damian Dragon, MEGA, Joey Braggiol and Mikey Whipwreck in a 10-man "Psycho Circus" elimination match defeating Mike Spinelli, Tony Burma, Havok, Papadon, John Shane and Dickie Rodz with Crusher Doogan on January 28.

After a three-hour tryout match with WWE road agents Tommy Dreamer and Dean Malenko at the Nassau Coliseum, Raige officially signed a developmental contract with the WWE on February 24. Defeated Rodz for the NYWC Heavyweight Championship the following day, he continued his feud with Rodz defeating him in a rematch on March 18 with Mikey Whipwreck as special guest referee although he would eventually choose to relinquish the title on May 24 due to his commitments in Ohio Valley Wrestling after signing with the WWE.

Losing a tag team match with Discord to Roadkill & Kasey James on April 9, he returned to NYWS to teamed with Plazma, Javi-Air and Brett Matthews & Brian Myers in an 8-man tag team match defeating Dickie Rodz, Crusher Doogan, J.T. Tackleberry, Tony Burma and Mike Spinelli on April 22. Over the next few months he would split his time between New York and OVW losing to The Riggs Brothers in a tag team match with Fred Williams on April 26 as well as to Boris Alexiev on May 17 before suffering a torn adductor magnus in his upper thigh. He continued wrestling despite the injury and, while taking two weeks off, he returned to competition before his leg was fully healed and completely tore the muscle keeping him sidelined for three months.

Returning to action on August 19, he lost to Jacob Duncan in a handicap with Anthony Vein. After losing to Paul Birchill in a dark match on November 8, he returned to New York although failing to regain the NYWC Heavyweight title from Dickie Rodz on November 28. Easily defeating Damian Adams on December 1 to become the number one contender to the OCW Heavyweight Championship, he later defeated Vinny Viagra & Damian Adams in a handicap match on January 7 before losing to Charles Evans and Justin LaRoche in a tag team match with The Real McCoy at an OVW television taping on January 24. Teaming with Maverick, Plazma, Tony Burma, Mike Spinelli and Jerry Lynn, Raige lost to Dickie Rodz, Dan Dynasty, Jamie Van Lemer, MEGA and The Angus Brothers in the annual 10-man "Psycho Circus" elimination match on January 27 and to "The Big Deal" Daniel Rodimer at an OVW television taping several days later. The following month, he defeated Vinny Viagra for the OCW Heavyweight Championship in Ashland, Kentucky on February 3, 2007.

On March 19, Raige again appeared on Monday Night Raw appearing with Vince McMahon in several backstage segments as one of McMahon's personal security guards. After losing to Chet the Jett and Steve Lewington in a dark match with Scott Cardinal on March 21, he again appeared at WrestleMania 23 as one of The Undertaker's druids and as part of Melina's entourage on Monday Night Raw the following night.

After a second appearance with The Undertaker at SmackDown on April 6, he would successfully defend the OCW Heavyweight Championship against Tank Toland the following night. He would also defeat Jacob Duncan in a dark match at an OVW television taping on May 23 and teaming with Von Lilas at a Derby City Wrestling event defeated Lennox Lightfoot and Dre Blitz on June 27.

== Championships and accomplishments ==
- New York Wrestling Connection

- NYWC Heavyweight Championship (1 time)
- NYWC Tag Team Championship (1 time) - with Dickie Rodz

- Ohio Championship Wrestling

- OCW Heavyweight Championship (2 time) defeated Vinnie Viagra and JD Michaels.

== Media ==
- Watch Me...Because You Can't Stop Me. Perf. Mason Raige. DVD. MasonRaige.com, 2006.
