= Jazz (wrestler) =

American professional wrestler

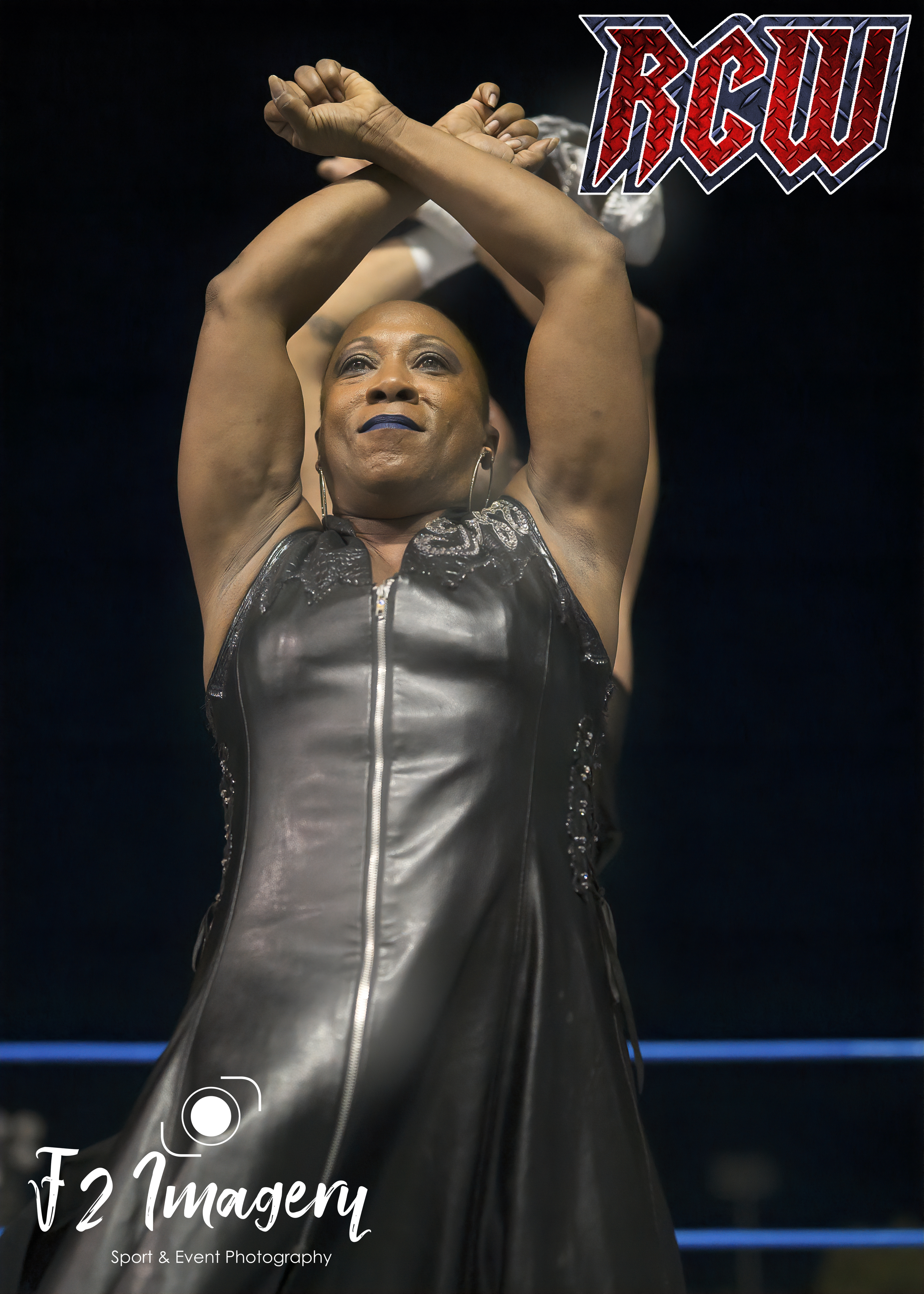
- Jazz in 2019

Personal information
- Born: Carlene Denise Moore; August 27, 1973 (age 53) New Orleans, Louisiana, U.S.
- Spouse: Rodney Mack (m. 2008)
- Children: 2

Professional wrestling career
- Ring name(s): Jazz; Jazzmine
- Billed height: 5 ft 4 in (163 cm)
- Billed from: New Orleans, Louisiana
- Trained by: Rod Price
- Debut: 1998
- Retired: April 10, 2021

Carlene Denise Moore-Begnaud (born August 27, 1973) is a retired American professional wrestler and manager, better known by her ring name Jazz. She is signed to WWE as a trainer at the WWE Performance Center, and was also a two-time WWF/WWE Women's Champion. She has also competed for the National Wrestling Alliance, where she held the NWA World Women's Championship for over 900 days. She's a producer and the head of women's division for NWA.

She is also known for her tenure in Extreme Championship Wrestling (ECW), and Impact Wrestling, where she retired from in-ring competition.

== Professional wrestling career ==
=== Early career (1998–1999) ===
Made her debut in wrestling in 1998 working for independent promotions in Kansas and Texas.

=== Extreme Championship Wrestling (1999–2000) ===
After dropping out of college, Begnaud was approached about starting a career as a professional wrestler and joined a wrestling school in Louisiana. She was originally inspired to be a wrestler when she saw Jacqueline Moore perform. Begnaud trained with Rod Price for six to eight months, and she later made her professional wrestling debut in a match against Moore.

Using the name Jazzmine, she later joined Extreme Championship Wrestling as a part of an alliance called the Impact Players, which included wrestlers such as Jason Knight, Lance Storm, and Justin Credible. She later began a feud with Jason and defeated him at Heat Wave in 1999. She appeared on an intermittent basis before leaving the company before ECW was shut down due to bankruptcy.

=== World Wrestling Federation/Entertainment (2001–2004) ===
==== Training and debut (2001) ====
In late 2001, the World Wrestling Federation expressed interest in Begnaud, and she was sent to Ohio Valley Wrestling for six months to train. Under the new ring name Jazz, she signed a two-year contract with WWF. She made her debut in the company as a heel on the Survivor Series pay-per-view during a Six-Pack Challenge match for the WWF Women's Championship, which had been vacated by Chyna after her departure from the company. Ultimately, Trish Stratus was the winner for the match and the championship.

==== Women's Champion (2002) ====
Following her debut in the company, Jazz began her first rivalry with then-Women's Champion Trish Stratus as on the January 14, episode of Raw, Jazz received a push as she defeated Jacqueline to become the number one contender to Stratus' Women's title. Jazz received her championship match against Trish at the Royal Rumble pay-per-view, where she was unsuccessful in capturing the title, however, on the February 4, 2002 episode of Raw, Jazz defeated Stratus to win the Women's Championship for the first time. On March 17, at WrestleMania X8, Jazz successfully defended her title against Lita and Trish Stratus in a triple–threat match.

On May 6, 2002, the World Wrestling Federation was renamed to World Wrestling Entertainment, subsequently renaming the title to the WWE Women's Championship, as a result, Jazz became the last woman to hold the Women's title under the WWF banner and the first to hold it under the WWE banner. On the April 29, episode of Raw, Jazz challenged Bubba Ray Dudley for the Hardcore Championship, although didn't win the championship, she successfully helped Stevie Richards to capture it. On the May 6, episode of Raw, Jazz was helped by Richards to retain her title against Trish Stratus, after knocking her with a superkick, after the match, Bubba Ray attacked both Steven and Jazz to try regain his title although multiple superstars started competing for it changing simultaneously from holders like Raven, Justin Credible, Crash, Trish Stratus and finally regained to Richard after being helped by Jazz, however, due to a torn ACL in her knee, Jazz dropped her title to Stratus in a hardcore-Rules match the following week on the May 13, episode of Raw. Post-match, she was attacked by both Bubba Ray and Stratus as he performed an aided superbomb through a table on her.

==== Feud with Victoria and Trish Stratus (2003–2004) ====
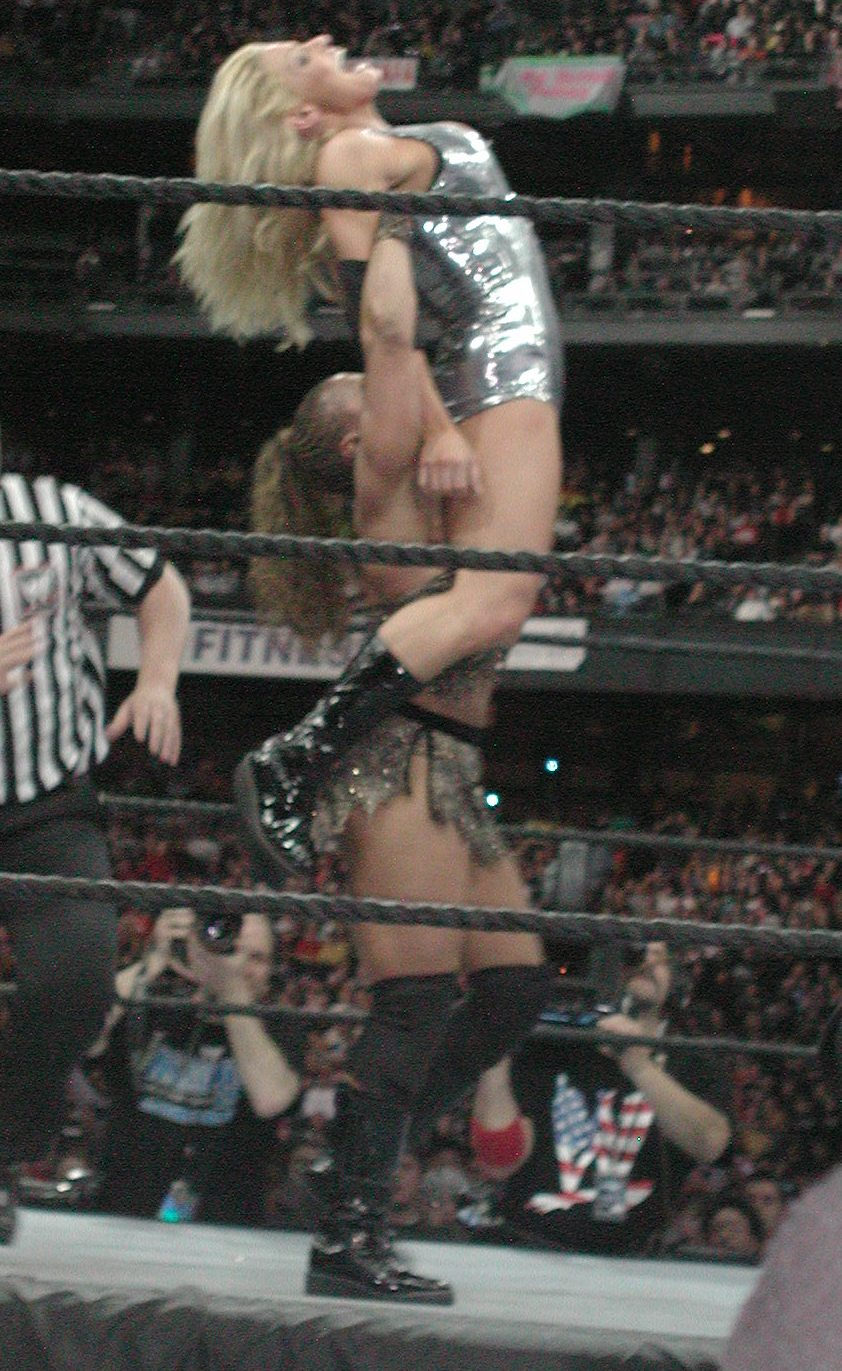
Jazz performing the Bitch Clamp on Trish Stratus at WrestleMania XIX

Jazz made her return on the January 27, 2003 episode of Raw, viciously attacking Trish Stratus after a Chicago Street Fight for Victoria's Women's Championship, in which Stratus was defeated. She made her return in–ring action on the February 10 episode of Raw, defeating Molly Holly in a singles match.

Jazz involved herself in the feud between Stratus and Victoria upon her return. She immediately took out Stratus and dominated in matches against Molly Holly and Jacqueline. She competed in a triple threat match for the Women's Championship at WrestleMania XIX against Stratus and Victoria, but Stratus walked away with the title. During this time, she took on the managerial services of Theodore Long, which led to another Women's Championship reign after defeating Stratus at Backlash. She had another successful title defence at Judgment Day in a Fatal Four-Way Match involving Stratus, Victoria and Jacqueline. However, she lost the title in a battle royal to Gail Kim on June 30. During the match, Jazz had sustained a chipped and dislocated shoulder and needed several weeks to rehabilitate. She returned from injury in early 2004, but was used sparingly. Later that year, she became manager and valet for her real-life husband Rodney Mack. She was released from WWE in November 2004 due to the creative department's lack of ideas for her character.

=== Independent circuit (2005–2006) ===
From January 16, 2005, she started working on the independent circuit and appeared at the unofficial ECW reunion show, Hardcore Homecoming. In late 2005, Jazz and Rodney Mack opened Dirtysouth Championship Wrestling, an independent promotion based in Louisiana. Jazz also performed in Women's Extreme Wrestling, where she won the company's World Heavyweight Championship in May 2005 in a Fatal Four M'enage Quatro match against Angel Orsini, Mercedes Martinez, and Simply Luscious when the previous champion, Tai "Killer Weed", was forced to relinquish the title due to an injury. While still WEW champion, on June 24, 2005, Jazz defeated April Hunter to win the NWA Cyberspace Women's Championship.

In 2006, Jazz and Mack renamed DCW to Downsouth Championship Wrestling. Soon after the promotion's name change, Jazz won her promotion's Louisiana State Championship. Later that month on June 24, she participated in ChickFight V and debuted in All Pro Wrestling.

=== Return to WWE (2006–2007) ===
In 2006, Begnaud was one of several Extreme Championship Wrestling alumni to be returning to WWE for a limited amount of time. Jazz made her first appearance in WWE since 2004 as part of the new ECW during the WWE vs. ECW Head-to-Head show on June 7, where she faced then-Women's Champion Mickie James in a losing effort. Jazz, however, did not continue an on-screen role in the brand and only made a few appearances at ECW house shows, attacking the likes of Kelly Kelly and Francine, marking her last appearances with WWE. On January 18, 2007, Jazz was again released by WWE.

=== Women Superstars Uncensored (2007–2011) ===
In May 2007, Jazz and Rodney Mack were booked by the Queens of Chaos promotion in France. In late 2009, Jazz debuted for Women Superstars Uncensored in New Jersey, defeating Angel Orsini. On March 6, 2010, at the Third Year Anniversary show, Jazz was inducted into the WSU Hall of Fame along with Dawn Marie and Molly Holly. At the same event, Jazz unsuccessfully challenged Amber O'Neal to become the No.1 contender for the WSU Championship. She continued to compete with the company and with National Wrestling Superstars, where she teamed with former ECW star Balls Mahoney in a tournament. In 2010, Jazz won WSU's third Uncensored Rumble to earn a shot at Mercedes Martinez's WSU Championship. Mercedes defeated Jazz in the main event of WSU's inaugural internet pay-per-view, "Breaking Barriers", on November 5, 2010. Jazz was defeated by Alicia at WSU's four year anniversary show on March 5, 2011. However, later that same night, she offered herself as the mystery partner of WSU Tag Team Champion Marti Belle, whose partner, Tina San Antonio, was injured in the week prior. Marti Belle and Jazz defeated Amy Lee and Cindy Rogers and The Soul Sisters (Jana and Latasha) to become the "new" WSU Tag Team Champions, giving Jazz her first Tag Team Championships. Jazz, Belle, and Tina would be able to defend the belts under the "Freebird rule" where any two of the three could compete. Marti and Tina would lose the belts before Jazz was able to have a defense. Jazz was scheduled for a rematch but had to pull out for personal reasons.

=== Shine Wrestling (2012–2014) ===
On July 21, 2012, Jazz took part at the inaugural Shine Wrestling event Shine 1 where she was awarded the Legacy Award from Diva Dirt, a women's wrestling website. During receiving the award, Jazz was interrupted by Mercedes Martinez. At the event, Jazz defeated Sara Del Rey in the main event. Following the events of Shine 1, Jazz faced Martinez on August 17 in the main event of Shine 2, which ended in no–contest. After defeating Rain on September 21 at Shine 3, it was announced that Jazz will challenge the then-Shimmer Champion Saraya Knight for the title at Shine 4. On October 19, at Shine 4, Jazz suffered her first lost at Shine against Knight, after an interference from Martinez and Rain. On November 16, at Shine 5, Jazz teamed with Amazing Kong, where they defeated Martinez and Rain at the main event, ending Jazz feud with Martinez and Rain in the process.

On April 19, 2013, at Shine 9, Jazz defeated Ivelisse in a Shine Championship tournament qualifying match, however, Jazz never entered the tournament for undisclosed reasons, as this match was her last appearance on Shine. On April 4, 2014, at WWNLive's A Wrestling Odyssey event, Jazz unsuccessfully challenged Ivelisse for the Shine Championship.

=== Chikara (2016) ===
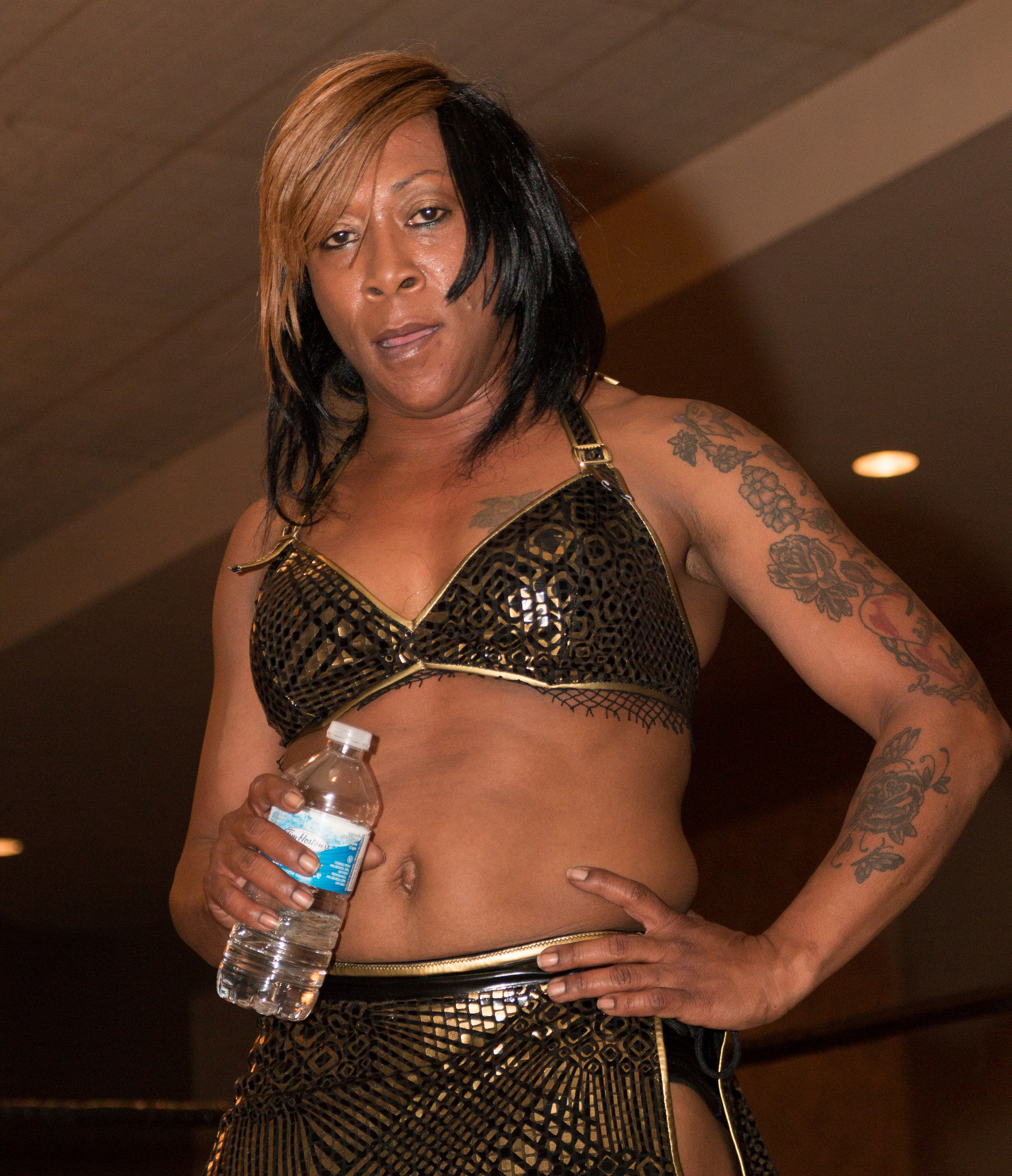
Jazz in April 2014

On September 2, 2016, Jazz made her debut for Chikara, when she entered the 2016 King of Trios tournament as part of Team Original Divas Revolution, alongside Victoria and Mickie James. They defeated Team Shimmer (Candice LeRae, Crazy Mary Dobson, and Solo Darling) in their first round match. The following day, Team Original Divas Revolution was eliminated from the tournament by The Warriors Three (Oleg the Usurper, Princess KimberLee, and ThunderFrog).

=== National Wrestling Alliance (2016–2019) ===
On September 16, 2016, Jazz captured the NWA World Women's Championship from Amber Gallows at NWA Texoma. On October 21, 2018, at the NWA 70th Anniversary Show, NWA's first pay-per-view in years, Jazz successfully defended her championship against Penelope Ford. Throughout her championship reign, Jazz went on to fend off title contenders such as Allie, Jordynne Grace, and Thunder Rosa. Jazz was booked to defend her championship on April 27, 2019, at the Crockett Cup against Allysin Kay, but Jazz had vacated the title on April 22, 2019, due to medical and personal reasons. This ended a 948-day title reign. Jazz's reign as the champion is the third longest reign in the company history, right after Debbie Combs and The Fabulous Moolah.

=== All Elite Wrestling (2019) ===
On August 31, 2019, Jazz participated in the Casino Battle Royal taking place at All Elite Wrestling's All Out, but was not successful, as she was eliminated by ODB.

=== SWE Fury (2020) ===
Jazz held the SWE Fury Women's Title until August when she dropped the title to Miranda Gordy. Then in September she formally retired from SWE Fury and became the very first SWE Fury Hall Of Famer. She was presented the award by James Beard and Teddy Long in San Antonio, TX.

=== Impact Wrestling (2020–2021) ===
Despite being retired, on the November 24, 2020 episode of Impact!, Jazz made her debut on Impact Wrestling as she revealed to team with Jordynne Grace in the Impact Knockouts Tag Team Championship Tournament since she would like to retire on top of her career, by winning the title with Grace. They would defeat Killer Kelly and Renee Michelle in the first round but were eliminated on the second round by Havok and Nevaeh. After a lost against Grace at Genesis, they faced the Tag Team Champions Fire N Flava at Sacrifice, where they were defeated. Her final match with Impact Wrestling took place at Hardcore Justice, where she faced Deonna Purrazzo for the Impact Knockouts Championship in a title vs career match. After a farewell segment on the April 15th edition of Impact!, she began to work as a manager for Grace and her new partner, Rachael Ellering, before leaving Impact.

=== Return to NWA (2021–present) ===
After retiring from in-ring competition, Jazz revealed in April 2021 that she was offered to return to NWA as an agent. She would later work as a producer for When Our Shadows Fall and EmPowerrr pay-per-views. On December 4, during Hard Times 2, NWA held a tribute for Jazz. In February 2024, it was revealed that Jazz became NWA's head of women's division. On November 17, with NWA Texas officially established as one of NWA's territories, Dogg Pound Championship Wrestling (DPCW), owned by Jazz and her husband Rodney Mack, became the first regional promotion to officially join NWA Texas.

=== Return to TNA (2025) ===
Jazz made a surprise return to Total Nonstop Action Wrestling (TNA) on the February 6, 2025, episode of Impact!, where she competed in a battle royal to determine the number one contender for the Knockouts World Championship, which eventually was won by Savannah Evans. On March 13, it was reported that Jazz has been working as an agent for TNA.

=== Second return to WWE (2025–present) ===
In May 2025, Jazz served as guest trainer at the WWE Performance Center. On July 13, Jazz was shown in the crowd during the Evolution 2 event, being recognized as one of the pioneers of WWE's Women's Evolution alongside several female WWE Hall of Famers and legends. This marked her first WWE appearance since 2006.

On February 13, 2026, Jazz announced that she had joined the full-time coaching staff at the Performance Center.

== Personal life ==
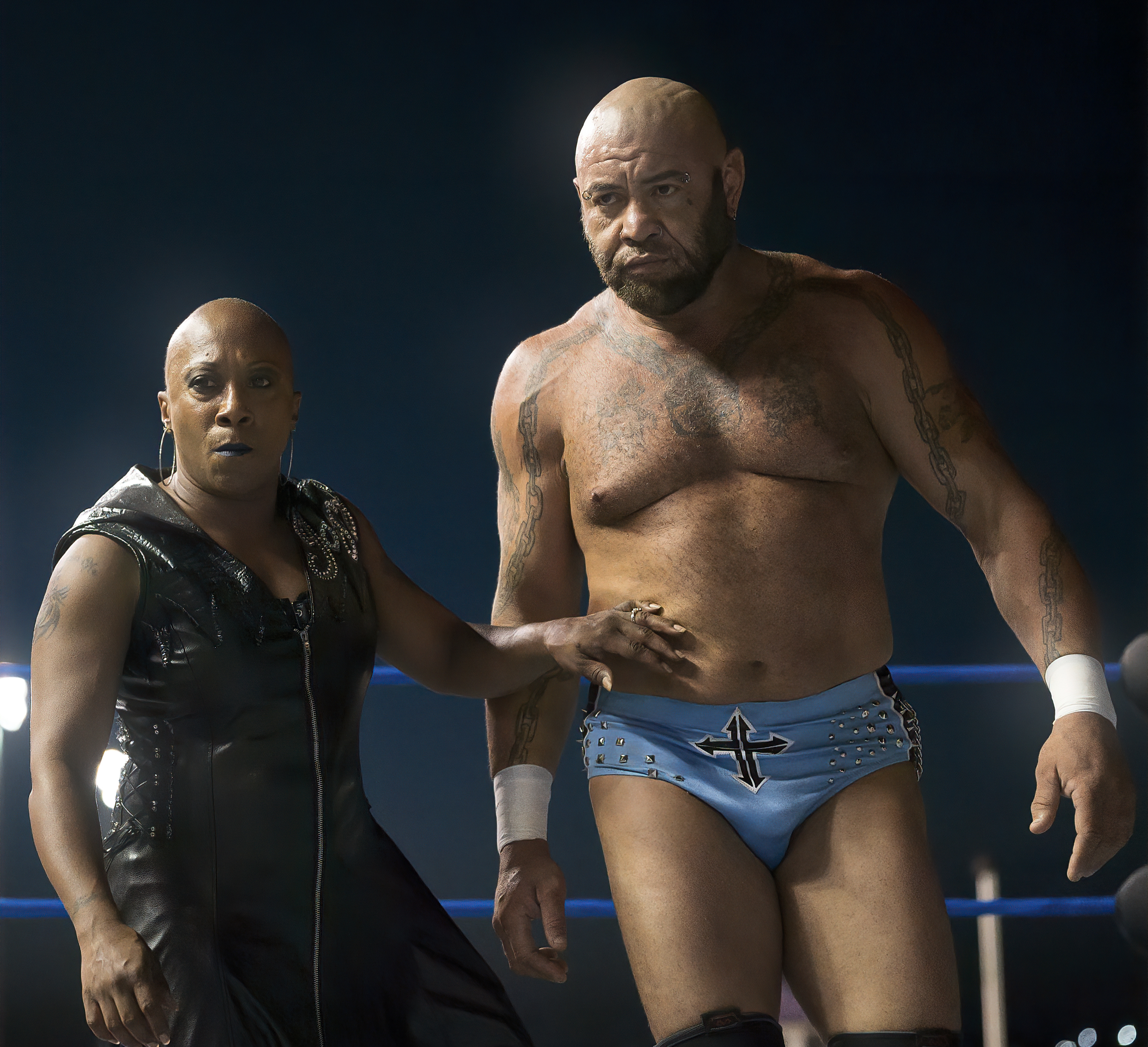
Jazz is married to pro wrestler Rodney Mack

In high school, Carlene played basketball. She also had a basketball scholarship in college until a knee injury ended her basketball career. She later dropped out of college to work.

Carlene is married to Rodney Begnaud, who also competed as Rodney Mack in WWE. They live together in Lafayette, Louisiana on 25 acres (100,000 m^{2}) of land. The couple welcomed twin girls named Summer and Skye in November 2008.

She owns a fitness gym, which according to her is to "keep the youth off the streets and keep them positive." She also runs a wrestling school with her husband called The Dog Pound.

In July 2016, she was named part of a class action lawsuit filed against WWE which alleged that wrestlers incurred traumatic brain injuries during their tenure and that the company concealed the risks of injury. The suit is litigated by attorney Konstantine Kyros, who has been involved in a number of other lawsuits against WWE. The lawsuit was dismissed by US District Judge Vanessa Lynne Bryant in September 2018.

Carlene has criticised WWE's marketing, claiming they undermarketed her and other wrestlers of color:

My situation with them is I was upset because the whole time I was there, they never gave me an action figure. The people of color were treated a little differently. They didn’t market me. I made myself. They gave me the platform to go out there but I got over on my own. There was no action figure, never on a poster, that’s the shit I was upset about. But, it’s all good. I still thank them for the opportunity because without them, I probably wouldn’t be sitting here now. I don’t hate them. I just want to be treated fairly.

== Championships and accomplishments ==
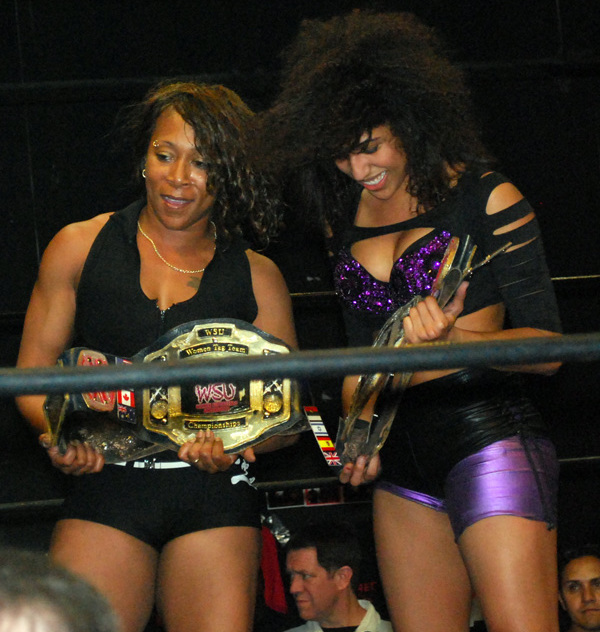
Jazz (left) and Marti Belle as the WSU Tag Team Champions in March 2011

- Cauliflower Alley Club
  - Women's Wrestling Award (2021, 2025)
- Downsouth Championship Wrestling
  - DCW Louisiana State Championship (1 time)
- George Tragos/Lou Thesz Professional Wrestling Hall of Fame
  - Verne Gagne Trainers Award (2026)
- Heavy on Wrestling
  - HOW Women's Championship (1 time)
- National Wrestling Alliance
  - NWA World Women's Championship (1 time)
- NWA Cyberspace
  - NWA Cyberspace Women's Championship (1 time)
- Pro Wrestling Illustrated
  - Ranked No. 13 of the top 50 female wrestlers in the PWI Female 50 in 2012
- Southwest Wrestling Entertainment
  - SWE Women's Championship (1 time)
  - Hall of Fame (class of 2020)
- Texas Wrestling Hall of Fame
  - Class of 2012
- Women Superstars Uncensored
  - WSU Tag Team Championship (1 time) – with Marti Belle
  - WSU Hall of Fame (Class of 2010)
- Women's Extreme Wrestling
  - WEW World Championship (1 time)
- Women's Wrestling Hall of Fame
  - Class of 2023
- World Wrestling Federation / Entertainment
  - WWF/E Women's Championship (2 times)

== Luchas de Apuestas record ==
Winner (wager)	Loser (wager)	Location	Event	Date	Notes
Deonna Purrazzo (championship)	Jazz (career)	Nashville, Tennessee	Hardcore Justice	April 10, 2021	
