= NWA Shockwave Internet Championship =

Professional wrestling championship

Details
- Promotion: NWA Shockwave
- Date established: October 19, 2002
- Date retired: 2007

Other names
- CSWF Internet Championship; NWA: Cyberspace Internet Championship
Statistics
- First champion: Billy Firehawk
- Final champions: Papadon (won June 2, 2007)
- Most reigns: N/A
- Longest reign: Josh Daniels (357 days)
- Shortest reign: Bobby Roode (64 days)

The NWA Shockwave Internet Championship was a professional wrestling Internet/television championship in NWA Shockwave (NWA-SW) and the National Wrestling Alliance (NWA). It was the original title of the CyberSpace Wrestling Federation promotion and was later recognized by the NWA as a regional title. It was introduced as the CSWF Internet Championship on October 19, 2002. It was established as an NWA heavyweight championship in 2005 following the promotion's admission into the NWA. The promotion became NWA: Cyberspace, and later NWA Shockwave, with the title remaining active until the promotion's close in 2007.

The inaugural champion was Billy Firehawk, who won a 15-man Rumble Royale on October 19, 2002 to become the first CSWF Heavyweight Champion. There were 8 officially recognized champions, however only two men, Josh Daniels and Papadon, held the belt more than once. Daniels also held the record as the longest reigning champion at 357 days. Many then current wrestlers from Total Non-Stop Action challenged for the title while competing in the promotion; Bobby Roode held the championship in for several months in 2006. Its last champion, Papadon, held both the Internet and Heavyweight titles during the final months of its existence.

== Title history ==
#	Order in reign history
Reign	The reign number for the specific set of wrestlers listed
Event	The event in which the title was won
—	Used for vacated reigns so as not to count it as an official reign
N/A	The information is not available or is unknown
+	Indicates the current reign is changing daily

=== Names ===
Name	Years
CSWF Heavyweight Championship	2002 — 2005
NWA: Cyberspace Heavyweight Championship	2005 — 2006
NWA Shockwave Championship	2006 — 2007

=== Reigns ===
#	Wrestlers	Reign	Date	Days held	Location	Event	Notes	Ref.
1	Billy Firehawk	1	October 19, 2002	266	Flemington, New Jersey	Halloween Horror (2002)	Won 15-man Rumble Royale to become the first CSWF Internet Champion.	
2	Justin Powers	1	July 12, 2003	63	Rahway, New Jersey	SummerBash (2003)		
—	Vacated	—	2003	—	N/A	N/A	The championship is vacated when Powers in unable to compete for personal reasons.	
3	Mike Tobin	1	April 24, 2004	316	Wayne, New Jersey	Retribution (2004)	Defeated Josh Daniels to win the vacant title. On January 8, 2005, the title was renamed the NWA: Cyberspace Heavyweight Championship when the promotion joins the National Wrestling Alliance.	
4	Josh Daniels	1	March 6, 2005	377	Wayne	Live event	Defeated Darkbird to win the vacant title. On January 8, 2005, the title was renamed the NWA: Cyberspace Heavyweight Championship when the promotion joins the National Wrestling Alliance.	
5	Bobby Roode	1	March 18, 2006	64	Deer Park, New York	CyberSpace Retribution (2005)	This was a flag match.	
—	Vacated	—	May 21, 2006	—	N/A	N/A	The championship is vacated when Roode wins the promotion's heavyweight title in Dover, New Jersey on March 26, 2007. The title becomes the NWA Shockwave Internet Championship when the promotion changes its name in June 2006.	
10	Papadon	1	January 13, 2007	112	Boonton, New Jersey	Live event	This match was a four way match also involving Grim Reefer, Josh Daniels and Mike Tobin.	
10	Josh Daniels	2	May 5, 2007	28	Clifton, New Jersey	Live event		
10	Papadon	2	June 2, 2007	N/A	Clifton	Live event	Papadon faced off against Daniels and Shockwave Heavyweight Champion Havok in a best of three falls three way dance for both belts.	
—	Deactivated	—	2007	—	N/A	N/A	NWA Shockwave ceases promoting events and closes in late 2007.	

== List of combined reigns ==
<1	Indicates that the reign lasted less than one day.

Rank (Note: Each reign is ranked highest to lowest; reigns with the same number mean that they are tied for that certain rank.)	Wrestler	# of reigns	Combined days
1	Josh Daniels	2	357
2	Mike Tobin	1	337
3	Justin Powers	1	286
4	Billy Firehawk	1	266
5	Papadon	1	112
6	Bobby Roode	1	64

== See also ==
- List of National Wrestling Alliance championships
