= Justin McIsaac =

American professional wrestler

Personal information
- Born: 1978 (age 47–48) New Hampshire, United States

Professional wrestling career
- Ring name(s): Justin Powers; Justin Shaype
- Billed from: Ithaca, New York
- Trained by: Jeff Costa, Maverick Wild
- Debut: August 1998

Justin McIsaac (born 1978) is a semi-retired American professional wrestler, also known by his ring names "The Alpha Male" Justin Powers or Justin Shaype, who competes in independent promotions on the East Coast and Northeastern United States. During the early 2000s, he was a mainstay of New England Championship Wrestling and Steve Bradley's Wrestling Federation of America as well as competing for Yankee Pro Wrestling, the Eastern Wrestling Alliance and NWA Shockwave where he won the internet championship in 2003.

In 2008, he came out of retirement to compete for Front Row Wrestling, where he won the FRW All Star Championship and later formed a successful tag team with "Wrong Way" Johnny Royal.

== Career ==
=== Early career (2000–2002) ===
A native of New Hampshire, Justin McIsaac made his professional wrestling debut around 2001 as "The Alpha Male" Justin Powers. He got his start with Green Mountain Wrestling in Newport, Vermont, and wrestled Brian Jury at its "Champions Challenge" supercard that same year. Early in his career, he was a guest writer and wrestling columnist for The Fatsquad. In November 2001, McIsaac took part in a benefit show, "Headlocks for Humanity", for the American Red Cross following the September 11th terrorist attacks. It was an interpromotional show, held at Anthony's Function Hall in Somerville, Massachusetts, that included stars from Chaotic Wrestling, the Eastern Wrestling Alliance, and NWA New England. He wrestled and lost to Maverick Wild. A month later, he took part in another benefit show for Sheldon Goldberg's New England Championship Wrestling at Somerville's Good Time Emporium on December 21, 2001. Co-sponsored by Boston rock station WBCN and Budweiser, the proceeds went towards WBCN's "Fund for the Families", which provided money for the families of victims of 9/11. McIsaac appeared on the undercard in an 8-man "Young Lions" elimination tag team match with "Heartthrob" Kurt Adonis, Aaron Morrison and a mystery partner against "Turbo" Tim Fury, Debonair Cruz, "Rapid Fire" Brian Jury and "Sudden Impact" Dylan Kage.

=== New England Championship Wrestling (2002–2003) ===
Soon afterwards, McIsaac began wrestling for Goldburg and New England Championship Wrestling and would be a regular at its home arena, the Good Time Emporium, for most of his time with the promotion. He also traveled the New England "indy circuit", making appearances for the Eastern Wrestling Alliance and Green Mountain Wrestling in early 2002. During this time, he frequently made three-hour drives from Dover, New Hampshire, to compete for promoter Joe Eugenio in Yankee Pro Wrestling and South Coast Championship Wrestling in Fall River, Massachusetts.

That summer, he wrestled visiting NWA UK Hammerlock wrestler "The Anarchist" Doug Williams at the Good Time Emporium on June 21, 2002. Distracted by the appearance of rival Maverick Wild at ringside, McIsaac was pinned by Williams with a rolling German suplex. The match was later released on DVD as part of "NECW's Greatest Matches: Gateway To Greatness". A month later, he unsuccessfully challenged Alex Arion for the TV Championship at a GMW Dojo television taping. That same month, he wrestled Arion for the NECW Heavyweight Championship at the promotion's 2nd anniversary show held at the Goodtimes Emporium. According to McIsaac, this and his earlier match against Doug Williams are his top two all-time favorite matches.

In September, McIsaac lost to Johnny Curtis in a 3 Way Dance with Brian Jury for the GMW Young Lions title at the Fenton Chester Arena in Lyndon Center, Vermont. On October 4, he joined with Maverick Wild in a tag team grudge match against Slyk Wagner Brown and NECW Heavyweight Champion Alex Arion (with manager April Hunter) at NECW's "Autumn Unleashed" supercard in Somerville. Later that year, McIsaac was among several Northeastern independent wrestlers to join the short-lived American Championship Wrestling promotion. He wrestled his one-time ally Maverick Wild at ACW's first and only show in Easton, Massachusetts, on November 23, 2002. The card also included such stars as Chris Venom, Larry Huntley, Alex Arion, Antonio Thomas, Captain Lou Albano, Chris Candido and Tammy Lynn Sytch. While he was scheduled to appear on subsequent television tapings, the promotion closed three months later.

=== CyberSpace Wrestling Federation (2002–2003) ===
In late 2002, McIsaac began wrestling for the Central New Jersey–based CyberSpace Wrestling Federation, appearing on its first show in Flemington, New Jersey, with Danny Doring and Mike Quackenbush. On January 25, 2003, he defeated The Hungarian Barbarian at the Healthquest Gym in Flemington when he was disqualified for throwing the referee nearly 10 feet out of the ring. Three months later, he lost to Chris Venom at NECW's "Spring Breakout" in Hamden, Connecticut, on April 19, 2003.

On July 12, McIsaac won the CSWF Internet Championship from Billy Firehawk at SummerBash in Rahway, New Jersey. He held the title for several months, however, as he soon left the promotion for undisclosed reasons shortly before his scheduled appearance at CSWF's "T-iNvAsion" in Rahway on September 13, 2003.

=== New England Championship Wrestling and semi-retirement (2004) ===
The following summer, McIsaac was back in NECW and appeared at the July 10 "United We Slam" show in Framingham, Massachusetts, where he and Aaron Morrison lost a handicap match to Adrenaline. On August 31, he lost to NECW Heavyweight Champion Frankie Arion at the Opera House in Rochester, New Hampshire. McIsaac remained in New Hampshire for the rest of the year wrestling with the Wrestling Federation of America. Under the name "Fitness Guru" Justin Shaype, he wrestled "Psycho" Mike Osbourne, Alex Arion and El Dragon during the next two months. On September 24, 2004, he lost to Scott Reed in a Triple Threat match with Frankie Fingers at the Newport Opera House in New Hampshire. At the end of the year, he lost to Vince Vicallo in a Loser Leaves Town match for the American Wrestling Federation at the Elks Hall in Dover, New Hampshire, on November 26, 2004. This match was not only his final appearance in the WFA but served as his official retirement match following the birth of his first child.

=== Front Row Wrestling (2008–2009) ===
In 2008, McIsaac came out of retirement after almost five years to wrestle for Eastern Wrestling Alliance-affiliate Front Row Wrestling. Though he won the promotion's heavyweight title, he lost it in a best of three falls match to Shane Sharpe in Rochester on November 15, 2008. He soon formed a successful tag team with "Wrong Way" Johnny Royal and together challenged FRW Tag Team Champions Dr. Reginald Heresy & "Fabulous" Johnny Vegas. On March 13, 2009, he and Royal met the two at a North Shore Wrestling show at the McCarthy Elementary School in Peabody, Massachusetts. Four months later in Rochester, he sought to regain the FRW Heavyweight title but lost to then-champion Sethoran.

=== Radio personality ===
McIsaac retired once again in 2009, and was a radio DJ / sports play-by-play announcer for Clear Channel Radio in Portsmouth, New Hampshire. McIsaac voiced the overnight shift (12am-5:30am) on 100.3 WHEB FM, and could sometimes be heard on the syndicated morning show "Greg and The Morning Buzz". McIsaac was also the voice of Portsmouth High School girls' and boys' basketball on 1380 WMYF AM.

McIsaac was the executive producer of "The WGIR Morning Show" on WGIR-AM 610 in Manchester, New Hampshire, from April to August 2011. McIsaac then took a job as sports director at WTSN-AM 1270 in Dover, New Hampshire, where he calls play-by-play of high school football, basketball, hockey, and baseball. McIsaac also gives sports reports during WTSN's "Morning Information Center" with Mike Pomp, and hosts the sports talk show "McIsaac on Sports" Saturdays from 10-11 am.

== Championships and accomplishments ==
- CyberSpace Wrestling Federation
  - CSWF Internet Championship (1 time)
- Front Row Wrestling
  - FRW All Star Championship (1 time)
