= Rodney Mack =

American professional wrestler and mixed martial artist

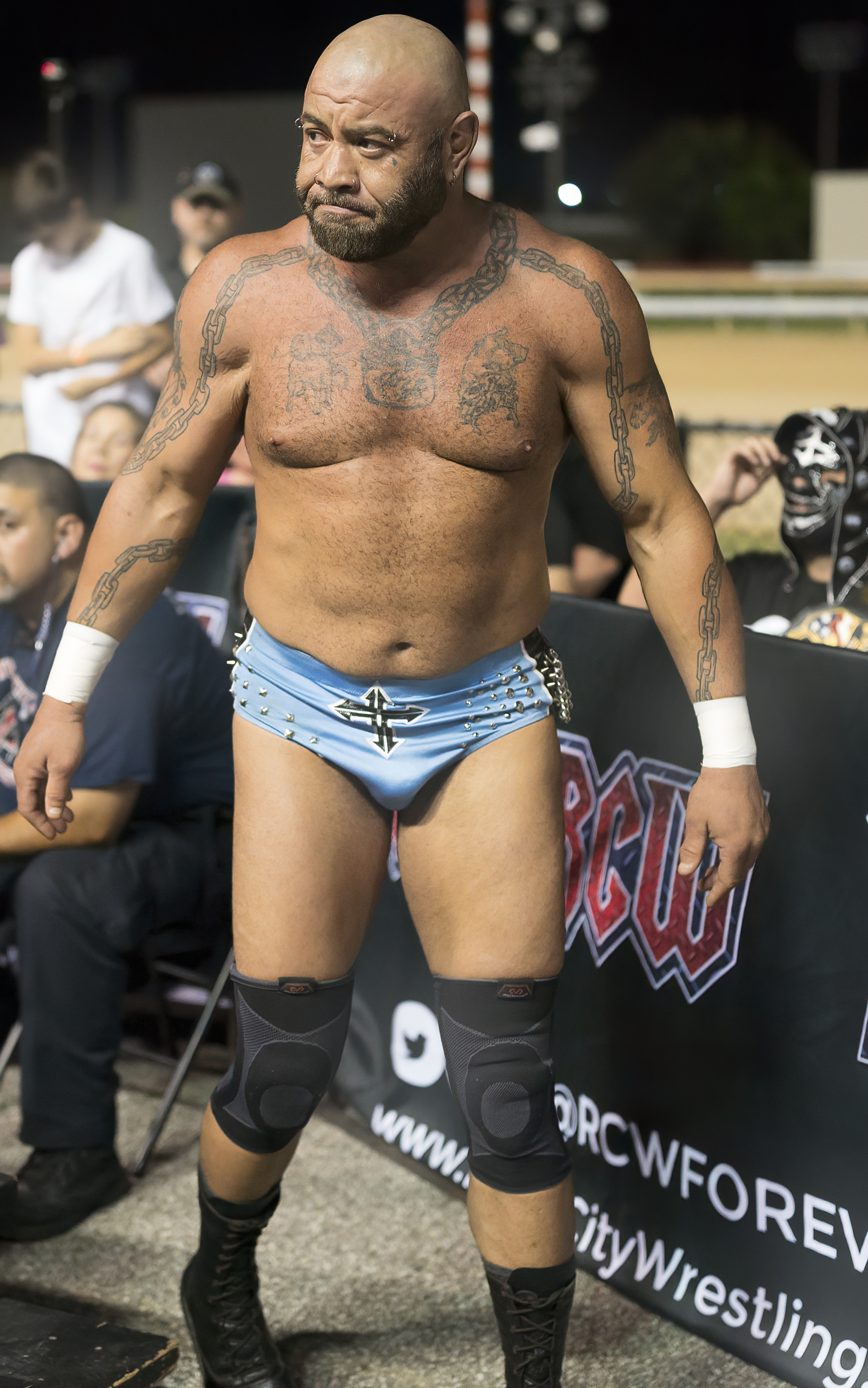
- Mack in 2019

Personal information
- Born: Rodney Begnaud; October 12, 1970 (age 56) Lafayette, Louisiana, U.S.
- Spouse: Jazz (m. 2008)
- Children: Two

Professional wrestling career
- Ring name(s): Badd Dogg; Damage; Mack Militant; Notorious D.O.G. Redd Dogg; Redd Dogg Begnaud; Rod Begnaud; Rodney Begnaud; Rodney Mack
- Billed height: 6 ft 2 in (188 cm)
- Billed weight: 240 lb (109 kg)
- Billed from: Baton Rouge, Louisiana
- Trained by: Rod Price; Junkyard Dog
- Debut: 1998

Rodney Begnaud (born October 12, 1970) is an American professional wrestler, promoter and mixed martial artist, better known by the ring name Rodney Mack. He is signed to the National Wrestling Alliance (NWA), where he performs under the ring name Damage as a member of Blunt Force Trauma, and is a former NWA World Tag Team Champion. He is best known for his time with WWE.

== Professional wrestling career ==
=== Early career (1998–2000) ===
After training with the Junkyard Dog, Begnaud made his professional wrestling debut in 1998 as Redd Dogg, and began competing for Southwestern independent promotions.

=== Extreme Championship Wrestling (2000) ===
After working on the independent circuit, Mack signed on with Extreme Championship Wrestling in June 2000, making his debut as a member of Da Baldies, a stable of members who all had bald heads. He would have matches with Chilly Willy (wrestler) and Michael Shane. Mack left ECW in October 2000.

=== Independent Circuit (2000-2001) ===
After ECW, Mack returned to the independents in Texas. In 2001, Mack worked for Professional Championship Wrestling based in Arlington, Texas.

=== World Wrestling Entertainment (2001–2004) ===
Begnaud was signed by World Wrestling Entertainment and was assigned to their developmental territory Ohio Valley Wrestling in 2001. While in OVW, Begnaud formed a tag team with Shelton Benjamin called The Dogg Pound. Together, The Dogg Pound won their first and only Southern Tag Team Championship on July 17, 2002. Begnaud, under his Redd Dogg ring name, then made his televised WWE debut on the January 16, 2003 episode of SmackDown!. He was placed alongside John Cena in an enforcer role, replacing Bull Buchanan, who was betrayed by Cena. After only one appearance on the SmackDown! brand, Begnaud was immediately moved over to the Raw brand and was subsequently renamed Rodney Mack. He made his Raw debut by attacking D'Lo Brown on an episode of Sunday Night Heat, with Theodore Long switching his managerial services from Brown to Mack.

Mack restarted Theodore Long's Thuggin' And Buggin' Enterprises stable, which eventually turned into a group of African Americans who worked a race angle in which they felt they were victims of racism and were being held down by "The Man". Jazz later joined the group in April. As part of the race angle, Mack often competed in a "White Boy Challenge" on Raw, where he would proceed to squash white wrestlers. During this time, Mack formed a tag team with Christopher Nowinski. Nowinski's inclusion within the stable, despite him being white, was explained by Nowinski claiming that he was also held down by "The Man" because of his intelligence. Together, Mack and Nowinski found some success as a tag team, their most notable victory being against the Dudley Boyz at Bad Blood on June 15. Mack's undefeated streak in the White Boy Challenges was ended on June 23 when he was defeated by Goldberg in under 30 seconds. The team of Mack and Nowinski continued until Nowinski suffered an injury and was diagnosed with post-concussion syndrome, which subsequently resulted in his retirement soon after.

To replace Nowinski, Theodore Long announced that Mark Henry would become Mack's new tag team partner. Despite only being a team for short while, Mack and Henry were fairly successful and scored some upset victories over some prominent tag teams.

In November 2003, Mack suffered a knee injury which prevented him from wrestling. He was supposed to return to action between March and June 2004, but was sent back to OVW and worked Raw dark matches throughout June and July 2004. Mack made his return to WWE television on July 26, 2004, where he participated in an over the top rope battle royal for an opportunity to compete for the World Heavyweight Championship.

On November 4, Mack was released from his contract along with a few others, including Jazz.

=== Return to the independent circuit (2005–2007) ===
After his release, Begnaud began competing on the independent circuit, most prominently for in NWA Cyberspace. In late 2005, Begnaud and Jazz opened Dirtysouth Championship Wrestling, an independent promotion based in Louisiana. However, DCW would be renamed Downsouth Championship Wrestling due to copyright issues in early 2006 before ceasing operations in early 2007.

=== Return to WWE (2006–2007) ===
On September 15, 2006, it was reported on WWE.com that Begnaud, along with Marty Jannetty and Brad Armstrong, had been hired by WWE. He started wrestling at ECW house shows on September 30, 2006. On January 18, 2007, Mack along with several other superstars (including his wife Jazz) were again released by WWE.

=== Second return to the independent circuit (2007–2008, 2011–present) ===
After leaving WWE, Begnaud would make sporadic appearances on the independent circuit under his Rodney Mack ring name before winning the All-American Wrestling Tag Team Championship with Heidenreich on May 18, 2008 after defeating Latinos Locos. However, the title was vacated soon after due to interference in the original title match.

After a 3 year hiatus due to the birth of his twins, on June 11, 2011, Begnaud wrestled for the first time in three years and, under his Rodney Mack ring name, he defeated Brad Michaels in a match for NWA Oklahoma. Exactly six months later, Mack defeated Faroh of Phunk to win the NWA Mississippi Heavyweight Championship, his first championship in over nine years. On February 10, 2012, Mack wrestled Scot Summers for the NWA Texas Heavyweight Championship, but was unsuccessful in regaining the title. Following this, Mack would go on to lose the NWA Mississippi Heavyweight Title to Cale Conners on March 18. Mack made an appearance at a Southeast Championship Wrestling charity event in Greenville, Mississippi.

On May 21, 2016, Mack defeated Scott McKenzie to become the AIWF Southwest Champion in Athens, TX. Through 2016 and 2017, Mack mainly competed for the National Wrestling Alliance (NWA). In 2018 and in 2019 he has primarily appeared for Anarchy Championship Wrestling.

On August 26, 2023, under a mask with the ring name Damage, Mack won the NWA World Tag Team Championship as one half of Blunt Force Trauma by defeating La Rebelión at night one of the NWA 75th Anniversary Show.

== Mixed martial arts ==
Begnaud, under his Rodney Mack ring name, made his mixed martial arts debut on June 7, 2008, knocking out Joe Nameth by ground-and-pound in 21 seconds in the first round. He lost his second match with Andrew Staples via submission by a rear naked choke.

=== Mixed martial arts record ===
Professional record breakdown
2 matches	1 win	1 loss
By knockout	1	0
By submission	0	1

Res.	Record	Opponent	Method	Event	Date	Round	Time	Location	Notes
Loss	1–1	Andrew Staples	Submission (rear-naked choke)	Gladiator Promotions: Summer Knockouts	August 8, 2008	1	4:38	Baton Rouge, Louisiana, U.S.	
Win	1–0	Joe Nameth	TKO (punches)	USA MMA: Lafayette vs. The World	June 7, 2008	1	0:21	Lafayette, Louisiana, U.S.	

== Personal life ==
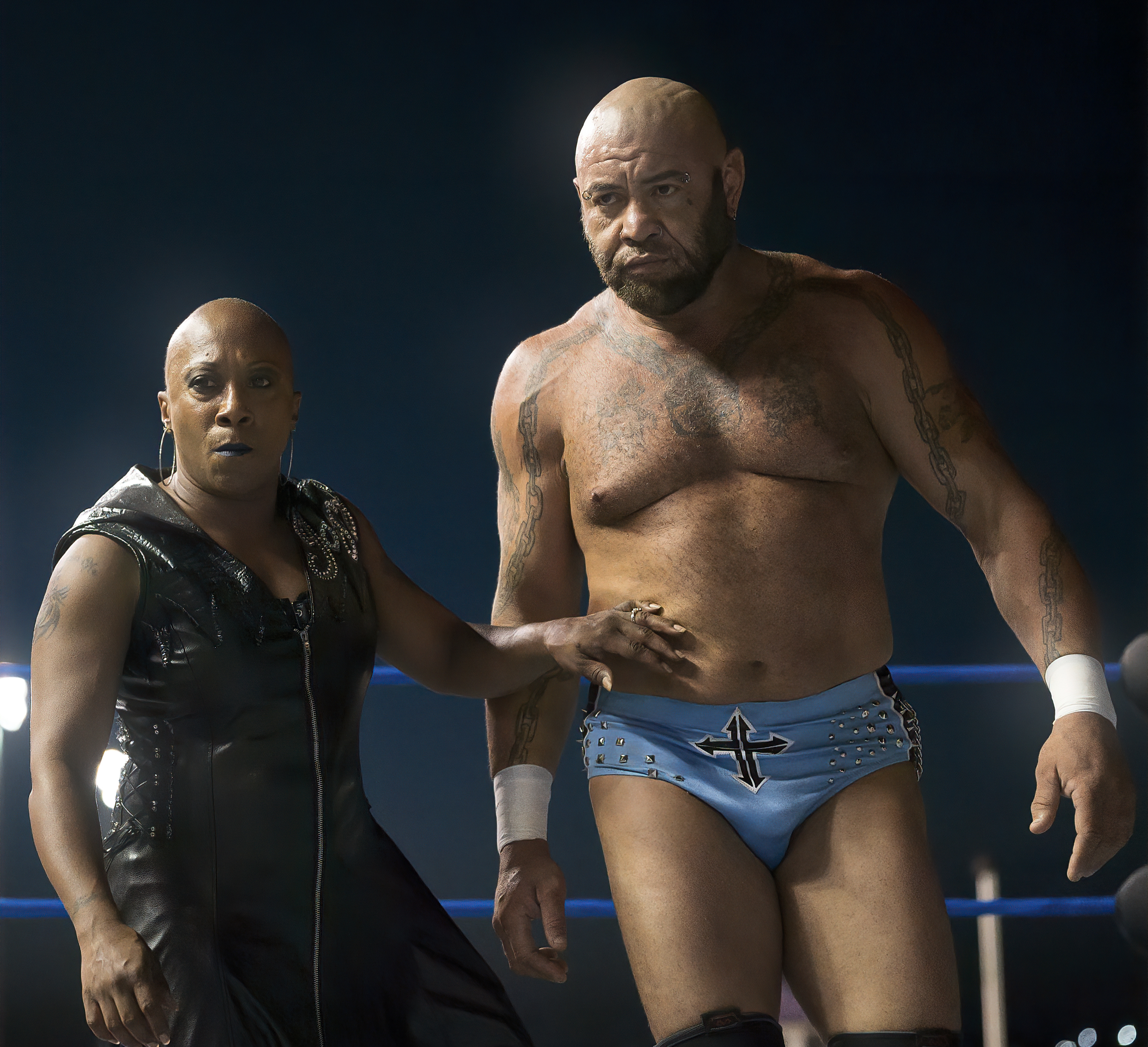
Mack is married to pro wrestler Jazz

In 2003, Mack appeared as a playable character in the video game WWE SmackDown! Here Comes the Pain.

He is married to fellow former WWE wrestler Carlene "Jazz" Moore. In November 2008, the couple had twin girls named Summer and Skye.

Begnaud also runs a professional wrestling school with his wife called "The Dogg Pound".

In July 2016, Begnaud was named part of a class action lawsuit filed against WWE which alleged that wrestlers incurred traumatic brain injuries during their tenure and that the company concealed the risks of injury. The suit was litigated by attorney Konstantine Kyros, who has been involved in a number of other lawsuits against WWE. US District Judge Vanessa Lynne Bryant dismissed the lawsuit in September 2018.

== Championships and accomplishments ==
- Allied Independent Wrestling Federations
  - AIWF World Heavyweight Championship (1 time)
  - AIWF Southwest Championship (1 time)
- All American Wrestling (Louisiana)
  - AAW Tag Team Championship (1 time) – with Heidenreich
- Elite Championship Wrestling
  - NWA Elite Heavyweight Championship (1 time)
- George Tragos/Lou Thesz Professional Wrestling Hall of Fame
  - Verne Gagne Trainers Award (2026)
- Insane Hardcore Wrestling/Iconic Heroes of Wrestling Entertainment
  - IHW Heavyweight Championship (1 time)
  - IHWE Triple Crown Championship (1 time)
- Lonestar Championship Wrestling
  - LCW Heavyweight Championship (1 time)
- National Wrestling Alliance
  - NWA World Tag Team Championship (1 time) - with Carnage
- NWA Mississippi
  - NWA Mississippi Heavyweight Championship (1 time)
- NWA Southwest
  - NWA Texas Heavyweight Championship (3 times)
- Ohio Valley Wrestling
  - OVW Southern Tag Team Championship (1 time) – with Shelton Benjamin
- Pro Wrestling Illustrated
  - Ranked No. 85 of the top 500 singles wrestlers of the year in the PWI 500 in 2003
- Southwest Wrestling Entertainment
  - SWE Television Championship (1 time)
  - SWE Tag Team Championships (1 time) – with Jaykus Pliskin
- Texas Championship Wrestling
  - TCW Heavyweight Championship (1 time)
- Texas Wrestling Hall of Fame
  - Class of 2011
- World Class Revolution
  - WCR Tag Team Championship (1 time) – with Dyl Dempsey
