= Yokozuna Memorial Show =

Professional wrestling event

- Promotion: World Xtreme Wrestling
- Date: 29 November 2001
- City: Allentown, Pennsylvania
- Venue: WXW Arena
- Attendance: 100 (est.)

Event chronology
← Previous; Gary Albright Memorial Show	Next → —

The Yokozuna Benefit Memorial Show was a professional wrestling event produced by World Xtreme Wrestling (WXW) promotion which took place on 29 November 2001, at the Lehigh Valley Sports Zone (WXW Arena) in Allentown, Pennsylvania. It was held in memory of wrestler Rodney "Yokozuna" Anoa'i, the nephew of promoter Afa Anoa'i and former two-time WWF World Heavyweight Champion, who died of pulmonary edema in Liverpool, England during a tour of Europe the previous year. The show served as a benefit show for his widow and two children, Keilani and Justin. Eleven professional wrestling matches were featured on the event's card, with two including championships.

Wrestlers from the Heartland Wrestling Association, Jersey All Pro Wrestling and the World Wrestling Federation appeared on the show, as did members of the Anoa'i family including The Wild Samoans, Afa and Sika Anoa'i, Afa Anoa'i, Jr., The Tonga Kid, and HWA Tag Team Champions The Island Boys (Ekmo and Kimo). WWF Hall of Famer Bob Backlund and Extreme Championship Wrestling manager Bill Alfonso also made surprise appearances during the event.

The main event was a standard wrestling match between Da Hit Squad (Monsta Mack and Mafia), and their mystery opponents, The Headshrinkers (Rikishi and Samu), in their first match together since 1994. In the semi-main event, The Brothers of Destruction (The Undertaker and Kane) wrestled The Acolytes Protection Agency (Faarooq and Bradshaw). Another featured match was Shannon Moore versus Jamie Noble, in a revival of sorts of the feud between World Championship Wrestling rivals 3 Count and The Jung Dragons, which Moore won. A second former WCW star, and graduate of the Wild Samoan Training Center, Billy Kidman beat Low Ki, and The Tonga Kid and The Hungarian Barbarian defeated The Twin Tackles (Gene Snisky and Robb Harper), accompanied by Bill Alfonso, in a non-title match for the WXW Tag Team Championship.

Two of the participants, Malachi and Supreme Lee Great, both called the show one their all-time favorites; SLG named the show one of the top three highlights of his career. Sal Corrente, co-founder of WrestleReunion, was also in attendance and later wrote "It was a night that won't easily be forgotten if I ever forget it". The WWF's involvement in the event was featured in WWF Raw Magazine in March 2002.

== Results ==
No.	Results	Stipulations
1	Tommy Suede (with Ariel) defeated Supreme Lee Great (with Little Jeanie)	Singles match
2	Afa, Jr. (c) defeated Nuisance (with Valentina)	Singles match for the WXW Television Championship
3	Inferno, Fargo, Reno and WXW Cruiserweight Champion Shane Black defeated Billy Dream (with Jessica Daly), Protege, B.A.D. and Doink	Eight Man Tag Team match
4	The Tonga Kid and The Hungarian Barbarian defeated The Twin Tackles (Gene Snisky and Robb Harper) (with Bill Alfonso)	Tag Team match
5	The Island Boys (Ekmo and Kimo) (c) defeated Cory K and Malaki	Tag Team match for the HWA Tag Team Championship
6	Big Dawg Molsonn defeated Eric Cobian	Singles match
7	Billy Kidman defeated Low Ki (with Dylan Dean)	Singles match
8	Shannon Moore defeated Jamie Noble	Singles match
9	Homicide defeated Crazy Ivan	Singles match
10	The Brothers of Destruction (Kane and The Undertaker) defeated The Acolytes Protection Agency (Bradshaw and Faarooq)	Tag Team match
11	The Headshrinkers (Rikishi and Samu) defeated Da Hit Squad (Monsta Mack and Mafia) (with Dylan Dean)	Tag Team match
(c) / – the champion(s) heading into the match

== See also ==
- List of professional wrestling memorial shows
