= WXW Heavyweight Championship =

Professional wrestling championship

Details
- Promotion: World Xtreme Wrestling
- Date established: 1997
- Current champion: Chico Adams
- Date won: December 21, 2019

Other names
- Top Rope/WSWF Heavyweight Championship (1997 - 1999); WXW Heavyweight Championship (1999 - present)
Statistics
- First champion: Bam Bam Bigelow
- Most reigns: Headshrinker Samu (7)
- Longest reign: Sugaa (570 days)
- Shortest reign: Shane Black, Metal Maniac and Mr. NYR (<1 day)
- Heaviest champion: Bam Bam Bigelow (390 lbs)
- Lightest champion: Jorel Ganzy (163 lbs)

The WXW Heavyweight Championship is the top professional wrestling title in the World Xtreme Wrestling promotion. It was created in 1996 as the WSWF Heavyweight Championship under WXW's original name, the World Star Wrestling Federation. The promotion renamed to its current name in 1998, and the title followed suit. The title history prior to January 10, 1997 is unknown, but there are 43 recognized known champions with a total of 69 title reigns.

== Title history ==
Key
No.	Overall reign number
Reign	Reign number for the specific champion
Days	Number of days held
+	Current reign is changing daily

No.	Champion	Championship change			Reign statistics		Notes	Ref.
No.	Champion	Date	Event	Location	Reign	Days	Notes	Ref.
1	Bam Bam Bigelow	1997	House show	−	1	N/A	The exact date and loss of the title are uncertain.	
2	Headshrinker Samu	1997	House show	−	1	30	The exact date and loss of the title are uncertain.	
3	The Hungarian Barbarian	December 10, 1997	Top Rope/WSWF	Freeland, PA	1	31	The exact date and loss of the title are uncertain.	
4	Jak Molsonn	January 10, 1998	Top Rope/WSWF	Freeland, PA	1	89		
5	Jake Molsonn	April 9, 1998	−	Hazleton, PA	1	140		
6	John Rambo	August 27, 1998	Top Rope/WSWF Channel 13 TV Taping	Harrisburg, PA	1	200	The exact date when Rambo vacated the title is uncertain.	
—	Vacated	March 15, 1999	—	—	—	—	The WSWF became World Xtreme Wrestling in November 1998. John Rambo was stripped of the title in March 1999 due to failure to defend the title within 30 days.	
7	Headshrinker Samu	April 24, 1999	House show	Hazleton, PA	2	147	Defeated The Mad Russian to win the vacant title.	
8	The Hungarian Barbarian	September 18, 1999	House show	Hazleton, PA	2	18		
9	Jake Daniels	October 6, 1999	House show	Hazleton, PA	2	24	Jake Daniels was formerly known as Jake Molsonn.	
10	Jak Molsonn	October 30, 1999	House show	Hazleton, PA	2	66	Defeated Oxx Hogg who substituted Jake Daniels and The Hungarian Barbarian in a three–way match	
11	Chicago Heat	January 4, 2000	House show	Plymouth, PA	1	8		
12	Jak Molsonn	January 22, 2000	House show	Hazleton, PA	3	28		
13	Sugaa	February 19, 2000	House show	Hazleton, PA	1	104	This was a fatal four–way match ladder match also involving The Inferno Kid and L.A. Smooth	
14	Shane Black	June 2, 2000	House show	Hazleton, PA	1	<1	Sugaa's WXW Cruiserweight Championship was also on the line in this match. Shane Black became the first person to hold both WXW Cruiserweight and WXW World Heavyweight Championships.	
—	Vacated	June 2, 1999	—	—	—	—	Black was stripped of both titles due to a controversial ending of the match.	
15	Sugaa	June 3, 2000	House show	Allentown, PA	2	105	Sugaa defeated Shane Black to win both titles. Sugaa held the Cruiserweight title until July 6, when he exceeded the cruiserweight division weight limit.	
16	Salvatore Bellomo	September 16, 2000	WXW Live TV	Hazleton, PA	1	115	This was a three–way match also involving Sugaa and The Hungarian Barbarian.	
17	Headshrinker Samu	January 9, 2001	House show	Allentown, PA	3	138		
18	Dylan Dean	May 27, 2001	WXW Memorial Day Madness 2001	Allentown, PA	1	21		
19	The Metal Maniac	June 17, 2001	WXW TV Taping	Allentown, PA	1	<1	Awarded the title by Dylan Dean.	
20	Headshrinker Samu	June 17, 2001	House show	Allentown, PA	4	126		
—	Vacated	October 21, 2001	—	—	—	—	Samu was stripped of the title by WXW Commissioner Lotto Money.	
21	Headshrinker Samu	October 21, 2001	House show	Allentown, PA	5	132	WXW Commissioner Lotto Money returned the title to Samu, because he was never defeated for it.	
22	Sugaa	March 2, 2002	House show	Hazleton, PA	3	112	This was a fans bring the weapons match.	
23	Afa Anoa'i Jr.	June 22, 2002	WXW Sportsfest 2002	Hazleton, PA	1	384		
—	Vacated	July 11, 2003	—	—	—	—	Afa Anoa'i Jr. vacated the title to leave WXW and attend college.	
24	Billy Dream	July 11, 2003	WXW Sportsfest 2003	Allentown, PA	1	100	This was a 20-man battle royal. Dream lastly eliminated Mana The Polonesian Warrior to win the vacant title.	
25	Gene Snitsky	October 19, 2003	House show	Sciota, PA	1	161	This was a last man standing match.	
26	Mana The Polynesian Warrior	March 28, 2004	House show	Mountainville, PA	1	62		
27	Rapid Fire Maldonado	May 29, 2004	House show	Sciota, PA	1	41		
28	Mana The Polynesian Warrior	July 9, 2004	WXW Sportsfest 2004	Allentown, PA	2	112		
29	Sinister X	October 29, 2004	WXW Halloween Mayhem 2004	Sciota, PA	1	26	This was a three–way match also involving L.A. Smooth.	
30	Jeff Coleman	November 21, 2004	House show	Sciota, PA	1	91		
—	Vacated	February 20, 2005	—	—	—	—	Jeff Coleman was stripped of the title, due to being unable to defend it within 30 days due to injury.	
31	Johnny Bravado	February 27, 2005	House show	Allentown, PA	1	91	This was a "whirlwind" match.	
32	Rockin' Rebel	May 29, 2005	House show	Bushkill, PA	1	40		
33	Johnny Bravado	July 8, 2005	House show	Allentown, PA	2	127		
34	Havoc	November 12, 2005	House show	Allentown, PA	1	117		
35	Headshrinker Samu	March 9, 2005	House show	Allentown, PA	6	402		
36	Rage	April 15, 2007	House show	Allentown, PA	1	48		
37	Headshrinker Samu	June 2, 2007	House show	Allentown, PA	7	336	The exact length of the reign is uncertain.	
38	Sugaa	March 5, 2008	House show	Minneola, FL	4	570	The exact length of the reign is uncertain.	
39	Dylan Night	September 26, 2009	WXW 1 Year In Florida Anniversary	Minneola, FL	1	126		
40	Sugaa	January 30, 2010	House show	Minneola, FL	5	21		
41	Dylan Night	February 20, 2010	House show	Minneola, FL	2	70	Dylan Night defeated Sugaa in the first ever Loser Leaves WXW Last Man Standing match to win the title.	
42	Nick Nero	May 1, 2010	House show	Minneola, FL	1	21		
43	The Perfect Creation	May 22, 2010	House show	Minneola, FL	1	112	This was a three–way match also involving CJ O'Doyle.	
44	Mark Silva	September 11, 2010	House show	Minneola, FL	1	42	This was a three–way match also involving Nick Folie.	
45	Richard J. Criado	October 23, 2010	WXW Halloween Extravaganza 2010	Minneola, FL	2	84	Criado was formerly known as The Perfect Creation.	
46	Dylan Night	January 15, 2011	House show	Minneola, FL	3	28		
47	Mark Silva	February 12, 2011	House show	Minneola, FL	2	308		
48	Bryan Maddox	December 17, 2011	House show	Minneola, FL	1	182		
49	Sean Maluta	June 16, 2012	House show	Minneola, FL	1	224		
50	Bryan Maddox	January 26, 2013	House show	Minneola, FL	2	105		
51	Nick Nero	May 11, 2013	House show	Minneola, FL	2	31	The exact length of the reign is uncertain.	
52	Bryan Maddox	June 11, 2013	House show	Minneola, FL	3	92	The exact length of the reign is uncertain.	
53	Noah Kekoa	September 11, 2013	WXW C4	Minneola, FL	1	240	The exact length of the reign is uncertain.	
54	Sean Maluta	May 9, 2014	House show	Minneola, FL	2	106		
—	Vacated	August 23, 2014	—	—	—	—		
55	Mark Silva	December 20, 2014	House show	Minneola, FL	3	41		
56	Sugaa	January 31, 2015	House show	Minneola, FL	6	71		
57	Irish Jack	April 12, 2015	WXW Xtreme War	Minneola, FL	1	90		
58	Mr. NYR	July 11, 2015	House show	Minneola, FL	1	<1		
59	ERA	July 11, 2015	House show	Minneola, FL	1	119		
60	Jaxen Blade	November 7, 2015	House show	Minneola, FL	1	266		
61	Sean Maluta	July 30, 2016	House show	Minneola, FL	3	367		
62	D. Ramos	August 1, 2017	House show	Minneola, FL	1	4	The exact length of the reign is uncertain.	
63	The Beast	August 5, 2017	House show	Minneola, FL	1	77		
64	Jorel Ganzy	October 21, 2017	House show	Minneola, FL	1	105		
65	D. Ramos	February 3, 2018	House show	Minneola, FL	2	105		
66	Deathrow Jethro	May 19, 2018	WXW Doomsday	Minneola, FL	1	N/A		
67	D3	2019	–	Florida, USA	1	N/A		
68	D. Ramos	September 28, 2019	WXW Slam Jam	Minneola, Florida	3	84		
69	Chico Adams	December 21, 2019	WXW Winter Warfare 2019	Minneola, Florida	1	2,325+	Defeated previous champion D. Ramos, D3 and Vertigo in fatal four-way match	

== Combined reigns ==
As of May 3, 2026.

†	Indicates the current champion
¤	The exact length of at least one title reign is uncertain, the combined length may not be correct.
<1	Indicates the reign was less than 1-day

Rank	Wrestler	No. of reigns	Combined Days
1	Chico Adams †	1	2,325+
2	Headshrinker Samu	7	1,311¤
3	Sugaa	6	983¤
4	Sean Maluta	3	697
5	Afa Anoa'i Jr.	1	384
6	Mark Silva	2	350
7	Bryan Maddox	2	287¤
8	Jaxen Blade	1	266
9	Noah Kekoa	1	240¤
10	Dylan Night	3	224
11	Johnny Bravado	2	218
12	The Perfect Creation/Richard J. Criado	2	196
13	John Rambo	1	186
14	Jak Molsonn	3	183
15	Mana the Polynesian Warrior	2	174
16	Jake Molsonn/Jake Daniels	2	164
17	Gene Snitsky	1	161
18	ERA	1	119
19	Havoc	1	117
20	Salvatore Bellomo	1	115
21	D. Ramos	3	193¤
22	Jorel Ganzy	1	105
23	Billy Dream	1	100
24	Jeff Coleman	1	91
25	Irish Jack	1	90
26	The Beast	1	77
27	Rage	1	48
28	Rapid Fire Maldonado	1	41
29	Rockin' Rebel	1	40
30	The Hungarian Barbarian	2	38
31	Sinister X	1	26
32	Dylan Dean	2	21
32	Nick Nero	1	21¤
34	Chicago Heat	1	8
35	Shane Black	1	<1
35	Metal Maniac	1	<1
35	Mr. NYR	1	<1
38	Bam Bam Bigelow	1	N/A¤
39	D3	1	N/A¤
40	Deathrow Jethro	1	N/A¤

== See also ==
- WXW C4 Ultimate Heavyweight Championship
