= Gary Albright Memorial Show =

- Original event poster
- Promotion: World Xtreme Wrestling
- Date: April 19, 2000
- City: Allentown, Pennsylvania
- Venue: Agricultural Hall

Event chronology
← Previous; N/A	Next → Yokozuna Memorial Show

The Gary Albright Benefit Memorial Show was a professional wrestling event produced by World Xtreme Wrestling (WXW) promotion which took place on April 19, 2000, at the Agricultural Hall in Allentown, Pennsylvania. It was held in memory of wrestler Gary Albright, the son-in-law of promoter Afa Anoaʻi and a mainstay of All Japan Pro Wrestling, who suffered a fatal heart attack at a WXW event in Hazleton, Pennsylvania three months earlier. Twelve professional wrestling matches were featured on the event's card, with two including championships.

The event featured wrestlers from both All-Japan Pro Wrestling and the World Wrestling Federation, as well as members of the Anoaʻi family including Afa, Jr. and Lloyd Anoaʻi, Samula Anoaʻi and Jimmy Snuka. Dwayne "The Rock" Johnson, another relative, made a special afternoon appearance at the Wild Samoan Training Center to make a pre-recorded message aired at the start of the event; this was followed by a live appearance by WWF Hall of Famer Bob Backlund later on in the show. Also notable on the card was Lucifer Grimm, who was Gary Albright's opponent when he suffered the fatal heart attack. Although a number of major stars were scheduled to be on the card, including Gangrel and Luna Vachon, Cactus Jack, Sabu and "Dr. Death" Steve Williams, many were unable to attend at the last minute. Others, most notably Rob Van Dam, were on hand for autograph signings.

The main event was a standard wrestling match between WWF wrestlers, Rikishi Phatu, and the challenger, The Road Dogg, which was followed by an impromptu four-way match with Too Cold Scorpio and Chris Jericho. Another featured match was Chris Jericho versus WWF European Champion Eddie Guerrero, in a non-title match which Jericho won. The Headbangers (Mosh and Thrasher) beat Kai En Tai (Sho Funaki and Taka Michinoku), and Maunakea Mossman, who was accompanied by Nicole Bass, defeated Johnny Smith. This was the first-ever match that Mossman had wrestled in the United States.

== Results ==
No.	Results	Stipulations
1	Sugaa and Too Cold Scorpio (with Ariel) defeated The American Hunk Society (Mark The Body & Tommy Suede)	Tag team match
2	Jimmy Snuka defeated Jak Molsonn	Singles match
3	Doink the Clown defeated "Showtime" Shane Black	Singles match
4	The Headshrinkers (Alofa and Samu) defeated Big Dick Dudley and The Hungarian Barbarian	Tag team match
5	Scotty 2 Hotty (c) (with Grand Master Sexay and Tommy Fierro) defeated Stevie Richards	Singles match for the WWF Light Heavyweight Championship
6	Afa, Jr. defeated Gillberg and Lucifer Grimm	Three-Way Dance
7	Crowbar (managed by Little Jeanie) defeated Judas Young	Singles match
8	The Headbangers (Mosh and Thrasher) defeated Kai En Tai (Sho Funaki and Taka Michinoku) (with The Prophet)	Tag team match
9	Maunakea Mossman (with Nicole Bass) defeated Johnny Smith	Singles match
10	Chris Jericho defeated Eddie Guerrero	Non-title singles match
11	Rikishi Phatu defeated The Road Dogg	Singles match
(c) / – the champion(s) heading into the match

== See also ==
- List of professional wrestling memorial shows
