= The Hungarian Barbarian =

American professional wrestler (born 1970)

Personal information
- Born: Zoltan Nagy; May 21, 1970 (age 56) Budapest, Hungary

Professional wrestling career
- Ring name: The Hungarian Barbarian
- Billed height: 6 ft 7 in (2.01 m)
- Billed weight: 305 lb (138 kg)
- Trained by: Afa Anoa'i
- Debut: c. 1997
- Retired: November 21, 2009

Zoltan Nagy (born May 21, 1970) is a retired American professional wrestler, known by his ring name The Hungarian Barbarian, who has competed in North American independent promotions including the Hardway Wrestling, National Championship Wrestling, the National Wrestling Alliance and World Xtreme Wrestling. He was also a regular tag team partner of "Dirty Deeds" Darren Wyse, both being longtime mainstays of NCW, and is the first and only wrestler to win the promotion's heavyweight, hardcore and tag team titles. The two have also won a number of tag team titles in various independent promotions as well.

He and Wyse were part of a heel stable with The Bad Crew known as The Pack which dominated Hardway Wrestling among several other Northeastern independent promotions during the late 1990s and early 2000s before their falling out initiated a major and long-running feud between the two teams. As well as their feud with Bad Crew on the independent circuit, The Hungarian Barbarian is also known for seriously injuring independent wrestler Cotton The Bad Butcher keeping him from active competition for over two years with a crushed ankle.

== Career ==
Born in Hungary and raised in Pennsylvania, after graduating from Delaware Valley High School in 1988, Zoltan Big started attending the Wild Samoan Training Academy where he was trained by Afa Anoa'i. He began wrestling for Afa's World Star Wrestling Federation (later World Xtreme Wrestling) where he won the WSWF World Heavyweight Championship, possibly against The Mad Russian, on December 20, 1997. He lost the title to Jak Molsonn in Freeland, Pennsylvania on January 10, 1998. The Hungarian Barbarian also began wrestling for the Eastern Wrestling Federation (later Hardway Wrestling), another Allentown-based promotion owned by the Bad Crew, where he participated in a championship tournament to crown the first EWF Heavyweight Champion losing to at the finals in Bethlehem, Pennsylvania on June 18, 1998. He managed to avenge this loss four months later defeating Flash in Bethlehem on October 31 and held the title for almost two months.

In Pro Wrestling eXpress during the next few weeks, he lost to Samu in North Versailles, Pennsylvania on December 11. This match was to decide the new PWX Heavyweight Champion which had been vacated after the previous champion, Bubba the Bulldog, was stripped of the title. He also lost the EWF Heavyweight title to "Doomsday" Danny Rose on December 18, 1998.

The following year, The Hungarian Barbarian teamed with rival Adam Flash to win the EWF Tag Team titles when he defeated Bad Crew #2 in singles match on May 21, 1999. On September 19, he won the WXW Heavyweight Championship from Samu in Hazleton, Pennsylvania and defended the title a little over a month before losing the title to Jake Daniels on October 6. He failed to regain the title in a three-way match with newly crowned WXW Heavyweight Champion Jak Molsonn and Oxx Hogg (substituting for Jack Daniels) on September 30. After a nearly five-month reign, he and Flash also lost the tag titles when Bad Crew #2 defeated The Hungarian Barbarian in another singles match in Northampton, Pennsylvania on November 12, 1999.

On April 19, 2000, he and Big Dick Dudley were defeated by The Headshrinkers (Fatu and Samu) at the Gary Albright Memorial Show. Later that year, he also lost to WXW Heavyweight Champion "Wildman" Salvatore Bellomo in a three-way match with Sugaa in Hazleton on September 16. The next month, he appeared at an October 25 show for Atomic Championship Wrestling in Adamstown, Pennsylvania with Nick Berk, The Backseat Boyz, Rockin' Rebel, Van Hammer and ECW stars Little Guido and Tony DeVito. Three days later at Cage Terror III, he defeated Dino Devine in a steel cage match for the EWF Heavyweight title in Bethlehem. He defended his title the next month at the Embassy Roller Skating Center in Pennsburg, Pennsylvania on November 25, 2000.

On June 8, 2001, he was paired with Bad Crew #1 in a Mix n Match tag team match in which he and Bad Crew #1 lost the titles to challengers Bart Scholl and Billy Redwood. On November 1, he also faced Dino Divine in a steel cage match in Palo Alto, Pennsylvania and, a week later, lost the HW Heavyweight title to Mongoose in Northampton. He and Wyse were later featured in Best of EWF, Vol. 1, a dvd released by the EWF which included highlights of the career in the promotion. Some of the matches included their appearance at the Cage Terror I supercard in which they were on opposing sides in a 12-man Barbed-wire steel cage match between Bad Crew, Tiny, Pinky, and George Anthony vs. Adam Flash, L.A. Smooth, Danny Rose, Jay Love and Running Bear. Others included his matches against Bad Crew # 2, Danny Rose, a scaffold match between him and Adam Flash against the Bad Crew and a three-way match between himself, Adam Flash and Danny Rose. Another dvd released by the promotion, EWF Best of Both Worlds, Vol. I also had a ladder match with Danny Rose, Adam Flash and The Hungarian Barbarian.

In January 2003, Bad Crew Paul gave up the title after winning it from Crazy Jake in Castle Hill, Pennsylvania earlier that month. On January 24, a match was held for the vacant title between the Hungarian Barbarian and Matt Vandal which Vandal won to win the title. The Hungarian Barbarian would have another chance to win the title at the Summer Spectacular supercard in Northampton when he participated in an 8-man battle royal in which the last three men could only win by pinfall or submission. The participants included Nick Berk, Skeeter McCoy, Master Bates, High Class, Billy Redwood, D-Man Davidson and Mike Alrad and, as one of the last three men, he lost the match when Billy Redwood was pinned by Nick Berk.

On August 15, he and Billy Redwood would team together to defeat Bad Crew for the HW Tag Team titles at the Raccoon Lodge in Northampton. Although losing the titles back to the Bad Crew early the next year, he and Darren Wyse took the titles from them Farmerrama Arena in Allentown on September 5, 2004. He also defeated Mega in the opening match of an event for Billy Firehawk's CyberSpace Wrestling Federation in Rahway, New Jersey. The show also featured Rob Eckos, Slyk Wagner Brown, Xavier and April Hunter. He and fellow WXW veteran Mana the Polynesian Warrior took on CSWF Tag Team Champions America's Most Wanted (Chris Harris and James Storm) at the CSWF supercard Halloween Horror in Wayne, New Jersey, but were unable to win the titles.

On April 22, 2006, he and Darren Wyse faced longtime rivals the Bad Crew in a 3-way Dance with Romeo Valentino and Cotton The Bad Butcher in Spring Grove, Pennsylvania. This was one of Cotton The Bad Butcher's first matches in over two years since his injury by The Hungarian Barbarian.

On November 3 in York, Pennsylvania, with manager Missy Hyatt, he and Wyse defeated the Bad Crew in a three-way match with Team VD to win the NCW Tag Team Championship. This was the first championship title ever won by Wyse as well as The Hungarian Barbarian, having previously won the NCW Heavyweight and Hardcore titles, becoming the promotion's first ever triple crown champion. He and Wyse were also featured in the NCW Hottie's & Bodies calendar which included Danny Rose, Adam Flash, Mike Quackenbush, Greg Matthews, Tom Brandi and King Kong Bundy.

On April 19, 2008, he and Wyse faced the United Kingdom's Andrew Bates on the first night of NCW's Ballroom Blitz tour in a no disqualification match with his manager The Chippendale Judge at the Tourist Inn in Hallam, Pennsylvania. The Patriot also appeared on the show. In their first official title defense at The Heart of Rock And Roll Supercard supercard, they faced The Backseat Boyz (Trent Acid and Johnny Kashmere) and Team VD (Eddie Valentine and John Dahmer) in a "Three Team Tango" match held at the York County School of Technology on May 23. This was also the reunion of Trent and Kashmere who had not wrestled as a tag team in over a year. The show also featured Jim "The Anvil" Neidhart, Ricky Morton, Doink the Clown, Axl Rotten and Ruckus.

In August 2008, they received a tryout match for World Wrestling Entertainment signing to appear for WWE Raw in Wilkes-Barre, Pennsylvania on August 25 and for the ECW brand on SmackDown in Pittsburgh the next night. The following year, he and Wyse announced their retirement and wrestled their last match together, along with Paul "Fat Paulie" Olesak, Jr., at a special NCW show entitled Final Night in Boots at the York County School of Technology.

== Championships and accomplishments ==
- Hardway Wrestling^{1}
  - HW Heavyweight Championship (2 times)
  - HW Tag Team Championship (3 times) - Adam Flash (1), Billy Redwood (1) and Darren Wyse (1)
- National Championship Wrestling
  - NCW Heavyweight Championship (1 time)
  - NCW Hardcore Championship (1 time)
  - NCW Tag Team Championship (1 time) - with Darren Wyse
- Pro Xcitement Wrestling
  - PXW Tag Team Championship (1 time) - with Darren Wyse
- World Star Wrestling Federation / World Xtreme Wrestling
  - WSWF/WXW Heavyweight Championship (2 times)

^{1}This includes his title reigns in the Eastern Wrestling Federation.
