= Jon Trosky =

American actor (born 1980)

Personal information
- Born: November 12, 1980 (age 45) Wilkes Barre, Pennsylvania, United States
- Website: JonTrosky.com

Professional wrestling career
- Ring name(s): Supreme Lee Great; Jon Trosky
- Billed height: 5 ft 10 in (1.78 m)
- Billed weight: 198 lb (90 kg)
- Trained by: Afa Anoa'i; Samula Anoa'i; Rikishi; Sal Bellomo; Jack Molsonn; Mike "Promo" Combs
- Debut: May 22, 1999 vs. Garrett Dominance

Jon Trosky (born November 12, 1980) is an American College Professor at Penn State University Hazleton, an actor / stuntman in the Screen Actors Guild professional wrestler known by his ring name Supreme Lee Great, who competed in North American independent promotions including the Hearitage Wrestling Association, Jersey All Pro Wrestling, various independent promotions under the National Wrestling Alliance umbrella, Pro Wrestling Unplugged, and World Xtreme Wrestling. One of the 200 finalists selected for the first season of WWE Tough Enough, Trosky made two appearances for World Wrestling Entertainment One on WWE Smackdown against Mark Henry the other on wwe velocity against the Gymini . He was also formerly employed an information technology consultant for with which he toured Italy and Australia between 2005, 2007, 2013, and 2019.

Trosky has also established a successful career as a stunt performer and coordinator. In 2007, he and Afa The Wild Samoan trained Nicolas Cage, and later Mickey Rourke, for the lead role in Darren Aronofsky's film The Wrestler. This led to further work in Tell Tale, starring Josh Lucas and Brian Cox, and in the independent film Big Fan as the stunt double for Patton Oswalt. He has since worked as a stunt rigger on the television series Life on Mars and Law & Order: Criminal Intent, and as a utility stunt performer in feature films Remember Me, 13, The Switch and Rabbit Hole. Trosky also was the stuntman in the Coke Zero Super Bowl XLIII Commercial that was a spoof of the 1979 Mean Joe Greene Coca-Cola commercial. The 2009 commercial featured Troy Polamalu tackling Trosky who was doubling for Robert Alan Beuth.

== Professional wrestling career ==
=== Independent circuit (1999-present) ===
Trosky became interested in professional wrestling at an early age when he and his brother were taken to see a World Wrestling Federation show at the local Catholic Youth Center in Scranton. Learning amateur wrestling in elementary school, he eventually had a successful career in high school winning district championships in folk style and placements in state tournaments for Greco-Roman freestyle wrestling. He also took second place at the Keystone State Games. Trosky was offered athletic scholarships to Wilkes University and King's College among others. After deciding to attend Wilkes, his scholarship was withdrawn a week before the semester as he had been competing professionally in violation of NCAA regulations. He eventually attended Bloomsburg University graduating with a degree in mass communications in 2003 and later received a master's degree in interactive instructional technology.

He and a friend, Garrett Orban, began competing in "backyard wrestling" as teenagers with Trosky using the name "The Comet Warrior". Trosky, along with Orban and Brian Dorshefski, also set up rings for Extreme Championship Wrestling and other local promotions, in part to Orban's friendship with local wrestling promoter Dan Kowal. Kowal, founder of GLOW, Women's Extreme Wrestling and The Wrestling Zone, later expressed interest in booking him and his friends after seeing one of their tapes in November 1998. They were originally supposed to appear in Kowal's WWWA promotion in February 1999, however several show cancellations pushed back his debut for several months. On May 22, 1999, Trosky had his first professional wrestling match against Garrett Dominance (Garrett Orban) in Malvern, Pennsylvania.

A few months later, he and another friend, Brian Dorshefski, traveled to Tennessee and Kentucky where he began his initial training with Mike Promo where he learned ring psychology and southern style wrestling. After two weeks, he returned to Pennsylvania and eventually started training at the Wild Samoan Pro Wrestling Training Center in Hazleton, Pennsylvania. As well as Afa and Sal Bellomo, other wrestlers involved in his training included Samula Anoa'i and former graduates Jake Molsonn and Tommy Suede. He graduated four months later, two months less than the standard six-month program, although he continued to train at the center throughout his early career and, in October 2000, he became an assistant instructor at the school. He also trained at the East Coast Pro Wrestling school and in the Tennessee-Kentucky area.

On June 23, 2001, Trosky was one of 16 light heavyweight wrestlers who competed in Jersey Championship Wrestling's J-Cup Tournament, a version of the Super 8 Tournament, and was eliminated by JCW Light Heavyweight Champion "Superstar" Dave Greco in the opening rounds. Other participants included the 2001 Super 8 Winner Low Ki, 2000 J-Cup winner Judas Young, EWF Light Heavyweight Champion Mike Quackenbush, UCW Heavyweight Champion Xavier, The S.A.T. (Amazing Red, Jose and Joel Maximo), Shark Boy,"Sure Thing" Ryan Wing, Little Dixie, Queenan Creed, White Lotus, Dylan Cage and Felipe the Pool Boy. Trosky also entered the 2002 J-Cup Tournament losing to American Dragon in the opening rounds in Lodi, New Jersey on June 15, 2002.

On February 2, 2008, Trosky challenged Judas Young for the NWA Pro Television Championship at the Knights of Columbus in Lodi, New Jersey. Awarded the Xero World Championship, he defended the title against Julio Dinero at Frontline: Countdown to Xtinction at the Abderdeen Proving Grounds in Aberdeen, Maryland on February 23. In December, he defended the WAW American title in a champion vs. champion match against WAW Heavyweight Champion Genesis at NWA WAW's Full Force at the Aberdeen Proving Ground. WAW Cruiserweight Champion The Dynamic Sensation, the kayfabe younger brother of Trosky, was banned from ringside by officials as one of the stipulations for the match.

=== World Xtreme Wrestling ===
During this time, he made his debut for Afa Anoa'i's World Xtreme Wrestling promotion twice winning the WXW Cruiserweight Championship as well as the WXW Tag Team titles with Tommy Suede. In February 2001, Trosky was made head trainer of the school under Anoa'i himself. On February 24, Trosky was also awarded the WXW Hardcore Championship after defeating the then champion Nicky Ice in a tag team match. Although defending the title for almost a month, he was forced to give back the belt when WXW Commissioner Lotto Money ruled that the title change was voided because, although Trosky had pinned Nicky Ice, the legal man in the ring was Lucifer Grimm. He officially surrendered the title at a WXW show in Hazleton, Pennsylvania on March 9, 2001. While in the promotion, he also appeared on its Yokozuna Memorial Show which starred wrestlers from ECW and the WWF as well as its first international tour appearing at US Army military bases in Japan, Korea, Guam, Okinawa and Hawaii. While on the independent circuit, Trosky defeated former WWF World Heavyweight Champion Bob Backlund.

==== Return to WXW ====
In 2007, Trosky emerged as the self-appointed "coach" of the "heel" stable in WXW known as TDSLG. By early 2008, the stable saw signs of breaking up after Trosky failed to defeat his old tag team partner Tommy Suede for the WXW Television Championship on January 5, 2008. Later that night, he and his partner The Dynamic Sensation lost to the debuting Island Kings (Samoan Dragon & Monguey) causing Trosky to argue with his partner slapping him in the face. He also confronted Ivan Radski, another stable member, who lost to AJ Sabotoge.

=== WWE Tough Enough ===
Trosky also tried out for the first season of Tough Enough and was one of the 200 selected but failed to make the final cut. Trosky has since criticized MTV's creative control to resemble a reality television styled show similar to Real World or Road Rules rather than a more realistic training program. Through Rikishi, he later trained with Bill DeMott and Dean Malenko prior to a television taping of WWE SmackDown.

Trosky appeared in other promotions during the next several years including the Heartland Wrestling Association, International Wrestling Cartel, Jersey All Pro Wrestling, the National Wrestling Alliance and Pro Wrestling Unplugged. In late 2004, Trosky taught a semester at Lackawanna College as a photoshop instructor. From 2005 to 2006, he worked as an information technology consultant for Nu-Wrestling Evolution and was also an instructor in mass communications at Northampton Community College the following spring. Trosky toured Italy with Rikishi and other professional wrestlers working with NWE during 2005. Trosky returned to Italy for one more tour that year and then added a tour to Australia in December 2007 with Rikishi, Gangrel and others for several performances in Perth.

== Stunt work and teaching ==
In the fall of 2007, Trosky was chosen by Afa The Wild Samoan to train Nicolas Cage and then Mickey Rourke for the lead role in the Darren Aronofsky film The Wrestler. Along with Tom Farra (aka Smooth Tommy Suede) Trosky trained Cage until Cage withdrew from the film shortly before Thanksgiving 2007. Aronofsky brought Rourke into the film and Trosky and Farra worked with Rourke for about eight weeks to prepare him for the movie which just won to top award in the Venice Film Festival on September 6, 2008. Trosky stayed with Rourke throughout the filming of the movie and appears as the referee in the final scene of the movie. During the making of "The Wrestler" Trosky joined SAG.

After The Wrestler wrapped in March 2008, Trosky went on to be a stunt double in Tell Tale which stars Josh Lucas and Brian Cox. That movie was released in early 2009 and is based on the Edgar Allan Poe story "The Tell-Tale Heart". He also was a stunt double for Patton Oswalt in the 2009 indy film Big Fan by Robert Siegel, also the writer of The Wrestler.

If the fall of 2008, Trosky started teaching at Lehigh Carbon Community College, DeSales University and Penn State Berks while taking offers for various stunt and acting work in New York City in between teaching classes. In recent years, he has been a stunt rigger on the television series Life on Mars and Law & Order: Criminal Intent, and a utility stunt performer in Remember Me, 13, The Switch and Rabbit Hole. At the end of 2010, completed work as a stunt coordinater for the short film On Edge starring Michael Maronna.

== Championships and accomplishments ==
- NWA World Alliance of Wrestling
  - NWA WAW American Championship (1 time)
- World Xtreme Wrestling
  - WXW Cruiserweight Championship (2 times)
  - WXW Tag Team Championship (2 times) - with Tommy Suede and TDS (The Dynamic Sensation)
- Xero Championship Entertainment
  - Xero World Championship (1 time)
- Pro Wrestling Illustrated
  - PWI ranked him # 408 of the 500 best singles wrestlers of the PWI 500 in 2005.
