= Sean Maluta =

American professional wrestler (born 1988)

Personal information
- Born: September 30, 1988 (age 38) Staten Island, New York City, New York, U.S.
- Family: Anoaʻi

Professional wrestling career
- Ring name(s): Samoan Dragon; Sean Maluta
- Billed height: 5 ft 8 in (173 cm)
- Billed weight: 191 lb (87 kg)
- Trained by: Afa Anoaʻi
- Debut: 2004

Sean Maluta (born September 30, 1988) is an American professional wrestler currently competing on the independent circuit. He made a number of appearances with WWE and took part in the first Cruiserweight Classic. He has also made appearances for Impact Wrestling (now known as Total Nonstop Action Wrestling) and All Elite Wrestling (AEW).

== Professional wrestling career ==
Maluta has made several appearances for WWE, starting in June 2016 when he was announced as one of 32 men participating in the inaugural Cruiserweight Classic. In his first and only match in the tournament, Maluta was eliminated by Kota Ibushi. Maluta again wrestled for WWE on July 13, this time in their developmental territory NXT, losing to Hideo Itami. The following day, Maluta teamed with fellow CWC participant Mustafa Ali in a dark match, losing to TM61 (Nick Miller and Shane Thorne). The following month, Maluta teamed with Ariya Daivari in a loss to The Bollywood Boyz (Gurv and Harv Sihra), and again lost to the Bollywood Boyz in September, this time teaming with Danny Burch. Maluta again returned to WWE in October, losing to Bobby Roode, once again in NXT. Maluta appeared on NXT on March 1, 2017, he was squashed by Patrick Clark. Maluta again competed for WWE in January 2017 on 205 Live, first losing in Tajiri's return match, and then to The Brian Kendrick the following week. Maluta returned to NXT on May 17, 2017, losing to Drew McIntyre. Maluta made another appearance the following year on the July 25 episode of NXT, losing to Adam Cole. In 2023, Maluta made his debut in Boca Raton Championship Wrestling and wrestled against Alan S2S Martinez.

== Championships and accomplishments ==
- Boca Raton Championship Wrestling
  - BRCW Tag Team Championship (1 time) – with Jaka
- Full Impact Pro
  - FIP World Tag Team Championship (1 time) – with Jaka
- World Xtreme Wrestling
  - WXW Heavyweight Championship (3 times)
  - WXW Television Championship (1 time)
  - WXW Cruiserweight Championship (3 times)
  - WXW Tag Team Championship (2 times) – with Nick Nero (1) and Afa Jr. (1)
  - Wild Samoan Tag Team Tournament (2017) – with Afa Jr.
