= Darren Wyse =

American professional wrestler

Darren Wise
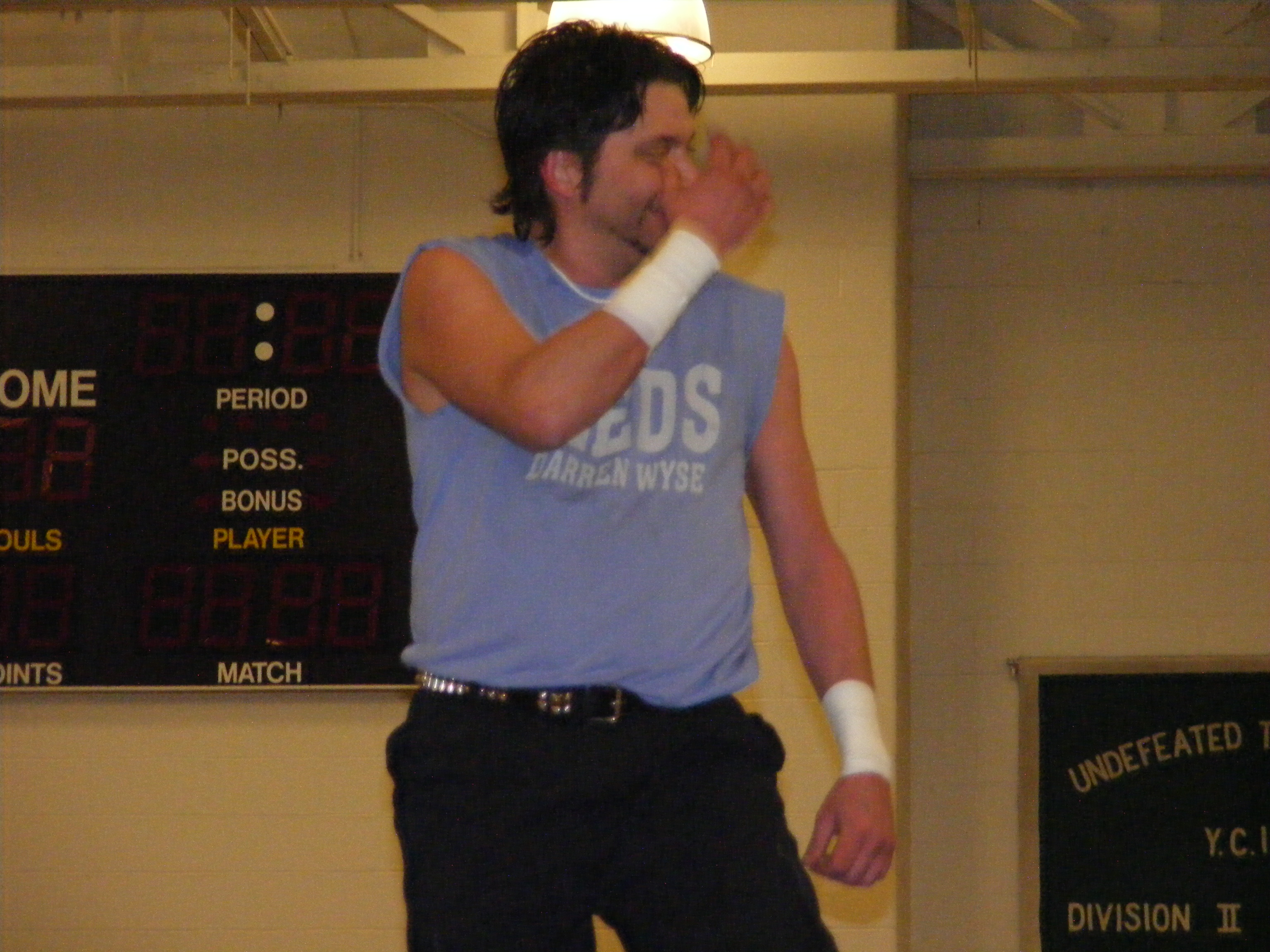
- Wise in 2009

Personal information
- Born: June 18, 1975 (age 51) York, Pennsylvania, United States

Professional wrestling career
- Ring name: Darren Wyse
- Billed height: 6 ft 0 in (1.83 m)
- Billed weight: 175 lb (79 kg)
- Trained by: Damien Kane; Larry Sharpe
- Debut: July 3, 1987 (as manager)
- Retired: November 21, 2009

Darren Wise (born June 18, 1975) is a retired American professional wrestler, manager, trainer and promoter, known by his ring name "Dirty Deeds" Darren Wyse, who competed in Northeastern independent promotions including International World Class Championship Wrestling, Hardway Wrestling, the National Wrestling Alliance, National Championship Wrestling, Pro Wrestling eXpress and the Memphis, Tenn. based United States Wrestling Association. Also the founder and current promoter for NCW, he and longtime tag team partner The Hungarian Barbarian, became the promotion's tag team champions in 2007. As well, they won numerous regional tag team titles on the independent circuit.

He and The Hungarian Barbarian were part of The Pack, a heel stable which dominated Hardway Wrestling and several other Northeastern independent promotions during the 1990s, before their break up and subsequent feud with The Bad Crew. He was frequently billed as the 6-time undisputed world "welterweight" champion as well as a former NWA Intercontinental Heavyweight Champion.

A former high school baseball stand-out, Wyse is also a semi-professional bowler and has competed in numerous local, regional and national tournaments.

== Career ==
=== Early life and career ===
Born in York, Pennsylvania, Wise was a fan of the World Wide Wrestling Federation as a child. He attended his first live event at the Harrisburg Zembo Temple where Dean Ho & Tony Garea took on Bobby Duncum & Killer Kowalski in the main event. Dean Ho would remain a fan of his for much of his childhood. Wyse made his professional debut on July 3, 1987, appearing as the manager of King Kahlua in his match against WWF veteran Jimmy Londos at a National Wrestling Federation show at the Reading Phillies Municipal Stadium in Reading, Pennsylvania. Other wrestlers who appeared at the event included The Fantastics (Tommy Rogers & Bobby Fulton), Chief Jules Strongbow, Damien Kane and Abdullah the Butcher.

Wyse played baseball during high school and, although he was seen by several scouts, various injuries would keep him out of professional baseball. He eventually trained with Damien Kane at the Mason-Dixon Wrestling Alliance, attending with SweetDaddy Guido Falcone, until the school closed. He later trained at Larry Sharpe's Monster Factory and worked for his promotion during his early career. During this time, he also became close friends with Chris Candido and future NWA President Dennis Coraluzzo.

At a show for Larry Sharpe at the Cherry Hill Race Track in Cherry Hill, New Jersey, he was noticed by Jerry Lawler and brought into the United States Wrestling Association where he faced Lawler, Bill Dundee, Jeff Jarrett and Billy Joe Travis. While in the USWA, he was one of several wrestlers to appear in the Dallas, Texas-based World Class Championship Wrestling for Fritz Von Erich. He also became friends with Missy Hyatt, then managing John Tatum, and helped her during her early career on the independent circuit prior to joining World Championship Wrestling.

He was also a founding member the Heart Throb Four with Flex Lavender, Johnny Gunn (Tom Brandi) and Chris Candido in Joe Savoldi's New York/ New England based International World Class Championship Wrestling during the mid-1990s. Although they only appeared for a few matches, they frequently appeared on IWCCW television for years afterwards.

=== National Championship Wrestling ===
Wanting to wrestle in his hometown, Wyse held a wrestling event at his old junior high school around 1992. Although he had originally held the show so as to put some of his booking ideas to work, the show was so successful that he ran a second show several months later. He began holding fundraising events for the local recreation commission and eventually decided to run regular events in the York-Red Lion area under the National Championship Wrestling banner and opened a training center in York. He also became involved in WPW and Dan Kowal's Women's Extreme Wrestling.

In 1999, he made an appearance on The Howard Stern Show promoting an upcoming NCW show featuring a member of Stern's "Wack Pack", Fred the Elephant Boy. Wyse also brought his wife, who appeared in his promotion as a ring card girl, as well another ring card girl, Kimberly, as his alleged mistress. The premise was that the two knew about each other and that Howard Stern would "rate" them for Wyse. Both were rated as 10s by the gang. His appearance on the Howard Stern Show became one of the highest-rated episodes in the show's history and was re-broadcast several times while in syndication on E!. He and his wife have since divorced. After being romantically linked to several of Pro Wrestling's hottest female starlets, he would then marry his High School Sweetheart, (a different) Kimberly.

Wyse also worked in various independent promotions as a color commentator with announcer Chad "R.C." Gerber, most notably, for Hardway Wrestling & Combat Zone Wrestling's Cage of Death III at the ECW Arena in December 2001. Although there were plans to bring in Wyse for a series of matches against Eddie Valentine, a dispute between him and independent wrestler Rockin' Rebel as well as scheduling conflicts caused the angle to be dropped. On March 9, 2002, Wyse also appeared on the second show for Iron Man Championship Wrestling at the Olivets Youth Center in downtown Reading, Pennsylvania.

=== Recent years ===
A longtime mainstay of Hardway Wrestling, an Allentown-based promotion owned by the tag team the Bad Crew, Wyse held the HW Hardcore Championship after defeating D-Man Davidson at Summer Spectacular in Northampton, Pennsylvania on July 11, 2003. He held the title for nearly a year before losing the title back to Davidson on June 30, 2004. Wyse and The Hungarian Barbarian began teaming together and won the tag team titles from the Bad Crew at the Farmerama Arena in Allentown on September 5. They had previously faced each other in a 12-man Barbed Wire Steel Cage match at Cage Terror I between Bad Crew, Tiny, Pinky, and George Anthony vs. Adam Flash, L.A. Smooth, Danny Rose, Jay Love and Running Bear. This match was later released by the promotion as Best of EWF, Vol. 1 on DVD. He and Wyse were also featured in the NCW Hottie's & Bodies calendar which included Adam Flash, Mike Quackenbush, Greg Matthews, Tom Brandi, Danny Rose and King Kong Bundy.

On April 22, 2006, he and The Hungarian Barbarian faced longtime rivals Bad Crew in a 3-way Dance with Romeo Valentino & Cotton The Bad Butcher in Spring Grove, Pennsylvania. This was one of Cotton The Bad Butcher's first matches in over two years since his injury by The Hungarian Barbarian.

On November 3, 2007, in York, Pennsylvania, with manager Missy Hyatt, he and Wyse defeated the Bad Crew in a three-way match with Team VD to win the NCW Tag Team Championship. This was the first championship title ever won by Wyse, in his own NCW federation. The Hungarian Barbarian, had previously won the NCW Hardcore Heavyweight title. This card also featured the Living Legend himself, Bruno Sammartino.

On April 19, 2008, he and Wyse faced the United Kingdom's Andrew Bates on the first night of NCW's Ballroom Blitz tour in a no disqualification match with his manager The Chippendale Judge at the Tourist Inn in Hallam, Pennsylvania. The Patriot also appeared on the show. Their match would later be broadcast on the pilot episode of NCW's television show hosted by Wyse and "Chippendale" Judge Lawless.

In their first official title defense at The Heart of Rock And Roll Supercard, they faced The Backseat Boyz (Trent Acid & Johnny Kashmere) and Team VD (Eddie Valentine & John Dahmer) in a "Three Team Tango" match held at the York County School of Technology on May 23. This was also the reunion of Trent and Kashmere who had not wrestled as a tag team in over a year. The show also featured Jim "The Anvil" Neidhart, Ricky Morton, Doink the Clown, Axl Rotten and Ruckus.

In August 2008, Wyse and his tag team partner received tryout matches for World Wrestling Entertainment signing to appear at WWE Raw in Wilkes-Barre, Pennsylvania on August 25 and for the Extreme Championship Wrestling brand on SmackDown in Pittsburgh the next night. Two of Wyse's students were also offered invites to appear during these shows. The following year, Wyse announced his retirement and wrestled his last match, in front of a turn-away crowd at a special NCW show entitled Final Night in Boots at the York County School of Technology. He teamed with Paul "Fat Paulie" Olesak, Jr. and The Hungarian Barbarian, also retiring with Wyse, in a Tables Ladders Chairs six-man tag team match.

Darren came out of retirement for one night only to be a participant in the "Trent Acid Memorial Rumble" at AcidFest, a tribute show on July 10, 2010, to honor the late Trent Acid at the old ECW Arena.

Wyse was inducted into the WPW Hall of Fame on February 25, 2012.

Wyse was inducted into the PWA Hall of Fame on May 19, 2012.

Wyse was inducted into the PPCW Hall of Fame on June 1, 2024

== Championships and accomplishments ==
- Hardway Wrestling
  - HW Hardcore Championship (1 time)
  - HW Tag Team Championship (3 times) - The Hungarian Barbarian
- Independent Wrestling Alliance
  - IWA Welterweight Championship (1 time)
- National Championship Wrestling (Pennsylvania)
  - NCW Welterweight Championship (1 time)
- National Championship Wrestling
  - NCW Heavyweight Championship (1 time)
  - NCW Hardcore Championship (1 time)
  - NCW Tag Team Championship (1 time) - with The Hungarian Barbarian
- National Wrestling Alliance
  - NWA Intercontinental Heavyweight Championship (1 time)
- Pro Xcitement Wrestling
  - PXW Tag Team Championship (1 time) - with The Hungarian Barbarian
- Regional Championship Wrestling
  - RCW Welterweight Championship (3 times)
- World Professional Wrestling
  - WPW Light Heavyweight Championship (1 time)
- World Wrestling Association
  - WWA Welterweight Championship (2 times)

== Media ==
- Hardway Wrestling, November 2, 2001 - Palo Alto, PA. Perf. Darren Wyse and Quick Micky Quick. 2001. DVD. Smart Mark Video.
- EWF - June 2, 2000 - Bethlehem, PA. Perf. Darren Wyse, Danny Rose, Bad Crew and The Backseat Boyz. 2000. DVD. Smart Mark Video.
- EWF - April 24, 2000 - Northampton, PA. Perf. Darren Wyse and Marshal Law. 2000. DVD. RF Video.
- NCW, 2/5/00 - Red Lion, PA. Perf. Darren Wyse, Porter, Vince Bono and Missy Hyatt. 2000. DVD. Smart Mark Video.
- Best of EWF, Vol. 1. Perf. The Hungarian Barbarian, Darell Wyse, George Anthony, Tiny, Pinky, LA Smooth, Jay Love, Running Bear, Danny Rose, Adam Flash and Bad Crew. 2001. DVD. Smart Mark Video.
