= Metal Maniac =

American professional wrestler (died 2026)

Personal information
- Born: Jeffrey Miller; 1956 or 1964 New Jersey, U.S.
- Died: October 2, 2026 (age between 61-70)

Professional wrestling career
- Ring names: Metal Maniac; Heavy Metal Maniac; Doink the Clown
- Billed height: 6 ft 2 in (188 cm)
- Billed weight: 275 lb (125 kg)
- Billed from: Sunset Beach, Hawaii
- Trained by: Jimmy Snuka; Don Muraco; Sivi Afi
- Debut: November 1991
- Retired: 2019

Jeffrey Miller (died October 2, 2026) was an American professional wrestler, best known under the ring name Metal Maniac. He worked in Extreme Championship Wrestling and the independent circuit.

== Musical career ==
Miller was a musician growing up in New Jersey playing bass for a rock band. His family owned the House of Musi recording studio, where he encountered legendary artists including Cher, Aretha Franklin, Kool and the Gang, Meat Loaf, and Tommy Shaw, guitarist for Styx, with whom he shared jam sessions.

== Professional wrestling career ==
Miller began his wrestling career in 1991. In 1992, he debuted for Extreme Championship Wrestling (ECW) in Philadelphia working as a preliminary wrestler. At the end of his first year with the promotion, the Metal Maniac was featured in The Wrestler's monthly "Introducing..." column. His last match for ECW was at NWA Bloodfest when he lost to The Sandman.

After leaving ECW in 1993, Metal Maniac started working in the independent circuit in New Jersey, Maryland, New England and Canada. That same year, he was named one of the top ten "rulebreakers" on the independents. He would feud with his teacher Jimmy Snuka for the majority of his career. From 1995 to 1998, he worked for Mid-Eastern Wrestling Federation in Baltimore. From 1997 to 1998, he wrestled as Doink the Clown for NWA New Jersey.

== Retirement and personal life ==
In 1998, Miller was a resident of Makiki in Honolulu.

In 2005, Metal Maniac retired from wrestling. He briefly returned to the New Jersey area for one more run in various independent promotions from 2017-2019 before moving back to Hawaii. He died on October 2, 2026, in Hawaii due to pancreatic cancer.

== Championships and accomplishments ==
- Century Wrestling Alliance
  - CWA Television Championship (1 time)
- East Coast Pro Wrestling
  - ECPW Heavyweight Championship (1 time)
  - ECPW Television Championship (1 time)
- World Xtreme Wrestling
  - WXW Heavyweight Championship (1 time)
