= Wxw Tag Team Championship =

Wxw Tag Team Championship may refer to:

- WXW Tag Team Championship of World Xtreme Wrestling
- WXW Women's Tag Team Championship of World Xtreme Wrestling
- wXw Tag Team Championship of Westside Xtreme Wrestling
