= WXW Television Championship =

Professional wrestling championship

Details
- Promotion: Top Rope Productions; World Xtreme Wrestling
- Date established: November 26, 2000
- Date retired: December 12, 2015

Other name
- WSWF Cruiserweight Championship
Statistics
- First champion: Shane Black
- Final champion: Sean Maluta
- Most reigns: CJ O'Doyle (4 reigns)

The WXW Television Championship is a professional wrestling title created in 1996 as part of Top Rope Productions and World Xtreme Wrestling when the promotion was renamed in 1998.

== Title history ==
Key

#	Order in reign history
Reign	The reign number for the specific set of wrestlers listed
Location	The city in which the title was won
Event	The event in which the title was won
—	Used for vacated reigns so as not to count it as an official reign
+	Indicates the current reign is changing daily

As of May 21, 2026.

#	Wrestler	Reign	Date	Days held	Location	Event	Notes
1	Shane Black	1	November 26, 2000	44	Allentown, PA	House Show	Defeated Tommy Suede in a 7-Man Tournament Final
2	Afa, Jr.	1	January 9, 2001	628	Allentown, PA	House Show	
—	Vacated	—	September 29, 2002	—	—	—	Title vacated when Afa, Jr. wins the WXW World Heavyweight Championship
3	Havoc	1	October 19, 2002	209	Bethlehem, PA	House Show	Defeated Wenzel in a tournament final to win the vacant title
4	Tommy Suede	1	May 16, 2003	126	Fountain Hill, PA	WXW	
5	Havoc	2	September 19, 2003	58	Fountain Hill, PA	WXW	
6	Slyk Wagner Brown	1	November 16, 2003	147	Fountain Hill, PA	WXW Rage TV	
—	Vacated	—	February 13, 2004	—	—	—	Title vacated when a match between Tommy Suede and Slyk Wagner Brown ended with a double pin
7	Tommy Suede	2	March 12, 2004	121	Sciota, PA	WXW	Defeated Slyk Wagner Brown in a Two Out of Three Falls Match to win the vacant title
—	Vacated	—	July 11, 2004	—	—	—	Title vacated when Tommy Suede is sidelined due to a back injury
8	Boogalou	1	July 11, 2004	110	Sciota, PA	WXW Rage TV	Boogalou defeated Cabbie, Kevin Matthews and Eddie Guapo in a Four Way Elimination Match for the vacant title
9	EC Negro	1	October 29, 2004	121	Sciota, PA	WXW Halloween Mayhem 2004	
10	Eddie Guapo	1	February 27, 2005	91	Sciota, PA	WXW	
11	Boogalou	2	May 29, 2005	216	Sciota, PA	WXW	
—	Vacated	—	December 31, 2005	—	—	—	—
12	The Dynamic Sensation	1	April 22, 2006	105	Allentown, PA	WXW	Defeated EC Negro to win the vacant title
13	Joker	1	August 5, 2006	1,050	Allentown, PA	WXW Rage TV	
—	Vacated	—	June 20, 2009	—	—	—	—
14	Kava	1	June 20, 2009	<1	Minneola, FL	WXW	Defeated The Perfect Creation to win the vacant title
15	CJ O'Doyle	1	June 20, 2009	7	Minneola, FL	WXW	
16	The Perfect Creation	1	June 27, 2009	91	Leesburg, FL	WXW	This was a Triple Threat Match also involving Kava
17	CJ O'Doyle	2	September 26, 2009	147	Minneola, FL	WXW 1 Year in Florida Anniversary	On January 30, 2010, O'Doyle defeats Da Biff to unify the WXW Television and WXW Hardcore Championships
18	Kid Breeze	1	February 20, 2010	70	Minneola, FL	WXW	
19	Brett Thunder	1	May 1, 2010	91	Minneola, FL	WXW	This was a Tag Team Match between Brett Thunder and WXW Cruiserweight Champion Gus Money and Sean Maluta and WXW Television Champion Kid Breeze, with both titles on the line. Thunder pinned Breeze to win the WXW Television Championship
20	The Puerto Rican Hound Dogg	1	July 31, 2010	21	Minneola, FL	WXW	Brett Thunder failed to attend the show, so Hound Dogg was awarded the title
21	TNT Mooley	1	August 21, 2010	21	Minneola, FL	WXW	This was a No Disqualification Match
22	Dylan Night	1	September 11, 2010	210	Minneola, FL	WXW	
—	Vacated	—	April 9, 2011	—	—	—	Dylan Night gave up the WXW Television Championship to get a shot at the WXW Heavyweight Championship
23	Brent Dail	1	July 30, 2011	91	Minneola, FL	WXW	Defeated CJ O'Doyle, Nick Nero and Sean Maluta in a Four Way Match to win the vacant title
24	CJ O'Doyle	3	October 29, 2011	77	Lakeland, FL	WXW	
25	Nick Nero	1	January 14, 2012	56	Minneola, FL	WXW	
26	Johnny Velvet	1	March 10, 2012	<1	Minneola, FL	WXW	
27	Erik King	1	March 10, 2012	98	Minneola, FL	WXW	
28	Alex G	1	June 16, 2012	182	Minneola, FL	WXW	
29	Erik King	2	December 15, 2012	98	Minneola, FL	WXW	
—	Vacated	—	March 23, 2013	—	—	—	Erik King vacated the title for personal reasons
30	CJ O'Doyle	4	April 20, 2013	84	Minneola, FL	WXW X-Treme War	Defeated Kenneth the Great to win the vacant title
31	Alex G	2	July 13, 2013	154	Minneola, FL	WXW	
32	Sugaa	1	December 14, 2013	252	Minneola, FL	WXW	
33	Alexander Page	1	August 23, 2014	161	Minneola, FL		
34	Mikey	1	January 31, 2015	21	Minneola, FL		
35	Alexander Page	2	February 21, 2015	70	Minneola, FL		
36	Big O	1	May 2, 2015	119	Minneola, FL		
37	Wildman Rojas	1	August 29, 2015	105	Minneola, FL		
38	Sean Maluta	1	December 12, 2015	3,813+	Minneola, FL		

== List of combined reigns ==
Symbol	Meaning
	Indicates the current champion
<1	The reign is shorter than one day

As of May 21, 2026.

Rank	Wrestler	No. of reigns	Combined days
1	Joker	1	1050
2	Afa, Jr.	1	628
3	Alex G	2	336
4	Boogalou	2	326
5	CJ O'Doyle	4	315
6	Havoc	2	267
7	Sugaa	1	252
8	Tommy Suede	2	247
9	Alexander Page	2	231
10	Dylan Night	1	210
11	Erik King	2	196
12	Slyk Wagner Brown	1	147
13	EC Negro	1	121
14	Big O	1	119
15	The Dynamic Sensation	1	105
15	Wildman Rojas	1	105
16	Eddie Guappo	1	91
16	The Perfect Creation	1	91
16	Brett Thunder	1	91
16	Brent Dail	1	91
17	Kid Breeze	1	70
18	Nick Nero	1	56
19	Shane Black	1	44
20	Sean Maluta	1	3813+
21	The Puerto Rican Hound Dogg	1	21
21	TNT Mooley	1	21
21	Mikey	1	21
22	Kava	1	0
22	Johnny Velvet	1	0
