= WXW Ultimate Heavyweight Championship =

Professional wrestling championship

Details
- Promotion: World Xtreme Wrestling
- Date established: May 3, 2008
- Current champion(s): Lance Anoa'i
- Date won: July 12, 2015

Other name(s)
- WXW C4 Ultimate Heavyweight Championship
Statistics
- First champion(s): Sugaa
- Most reigns: Eric Cobian (3 reigns)
- Longest reign: Billy Dream (317 days)
- Shortest reign: Sugaa (13 days)

The WXW Ultimate Heavyweight Championship is a professional wrestling championship in the American independent professional wrestling promotion World Xtreme Wrestling. Lance Anoa'i is the current champion in his second reign, he beat Bo Nekoda on July 12, 2015 at a WXW house show for the championship. There have been 18 WXW Ultimate Heavyweight Championship reigns and 13 total champions with one vacancy.

== Title history ==
Key

#	Order in reign history
Reign	The reign number for the specific set of wrestlers listed
Location	The city in which the title was won
Event	The event in which the title was won
—	Used for vacated reigns so as not to count it as an official reign
+	Indicates the current reign is changing daily

As of March 6, 2025.

#	Wrestler	Reign	Date	Days held	Location	Event	Notes
1	Sugaa	1	May 3, 2008	13	Coplay, PA	WXW C4 #1 - Debut Show	Sugaa and Billy Dream co-win a battle royal to crown the inaugural champion. Sugaa then pins Dream.
2	Tommy Suede	1	May 16, 2008	82	Coplay, PA	WXW C4 #2	
3	Sugaa	2	June 6, 2008	48	Coplay, PA	WXW C4 #3	
4	Billy Dream	1	July 24, 2008	317	Allentown, PA	WXW Sporfest 2008	This was a Triple Threat Match also involving Tommy Suede. Dream pinned Suede.
5	Eric Cobian	1	June 6, 2009	154	Allentown, PA	N/A	Won the Championship in a Go For the Gold match.
6	AC Anderson	1	November 7, 2009	225	Allentown, PA	WXW C4 Blast TV Taping	
7	Eric Cobian	2	June 20, 2010	286	Tamaqua, PA	WXW C4	This was a No Disqualifications match.
8	Eddie Guapo	1	April 2, 2011	106	Allentown, PA	WXW C4 International Assault	Afa Anoa'i Jr. was special guest referee.
9	Eric Cobian	3	July 17, 2011	20	Allentown, PA	WXW C4 Sportsfest	
10	Afa Anoa'i Jr.	1	August 6, 2011	91	Allentown, PA	WXW C4	This was a Triple Threat Match also involving Eddie Guapo. Afa Jr. pinned Guapo.
11	Nui Tofiga	1	November 5, 2011	105	Allentown, PA	WXW C4	This was a Fatal 4-Way Match also involving Eddie Guapo and Eric Cobian.
12	Afa Anoa'i Jr.	2	February 18, 2012	62	Allentown, PA	WXW C4/BCFW	This was a No Disqualification Match.
13	Gene Snitsky	1	April 20, 2012	197	Wind Gap, PA	WXW C4	This was a Falls Count Anywhere match.
-	Vacated	-	November 3, 2012	-	-	-	-
14	Joe Gomez	1	November 3, 2012	260	Allentown, PA	WXW C4 Go 4 The Gold	Defeated Danny Maff to win the vacant title.
15	Dan Maff	1	July 21, 2013	104	Allentown, PA	WXW C4 Sportfest 2013	
16	Lance Anoa'i	1	November 2, 2013	310	Allentown, PA	WXW C4 Final Conflict	This was a No Disqualification Match.
17	Bo Nekoda	1	September 8, 2014	307	Allentown, PA	WXW C4 When Kharma Calls	This was a No Disqualification Match.
18	Lance Anoa'i	1	July 12, 2015	3,525+	Allentown, PA	House show	

== List of combined reigns ==
Symbol	Meaning
†	Indicates the current champion.
<1	The reign is shorter than one day.

As of March 6, 2025.

Rank	Wrestler	Combined reigns	Combined days
1	Lance Anoa'i †	2	3,835+
2	Eric Cobian	3	460
3	Billy Dream	1	317
4	Bo Nekoda	1	309
5	Joe Gomez	1	260
6	AC Anderson	1	225
7	Gene Snitsky	1	197
8	Afa Anoa'i Jr.	2	153
9	Eddie Guapo	1	106
10	Nui Tofiga	1	105
11	Dan Maff	1	104
12	Tommy Suede	1	82
13	Sugaa	2	61

== See also ==
- WXW Heavyweight Championship
