= WXW Hardcore Championship =

This is a chronological list of WXW Hardcore Champions. The WXW Hardcore Championship is a professional wrestling title created in 1996 as part of Top Rope Productions and World Xtreme Wrestling when the promotion was renamed in 1998.

== Title history ==
Wrestlers:	Times:	Date:	Location:	Notes:
Billy Owens	1	January 14, 2000	Plymouth, PA	Defeated The Mad Russian in a singles match to become the first recognized WXW Hardcore Champion.
Afa, Jr.	1	February 5, 2000	Hazleton, PA	
Lucifer Grimm	2	March 25, 2000	Allentown, PA	
Moondog Wenzel	1	June 2, 2000	Hazleton, PA	Title later vacated.
Nicky Ice	1	February 11, 2001	Allentown, PA	Won a battle royal to win the vacant title.
Tommy Suede	1	February 11, 2001	Allentown, PA	
Nicky Ice	2	February 11, 2001	Allentown, PA	Won a battle royal to win the vacant title.
Supreme Lee Great is awarded the title after a pinning Nicky Ice during a match against Lucifer Grimm match on February 24, 2001. However the title is returned to Nicky Ice by Commissioner Lotto Money on March 9, 2001.
Latin Xplosion	1	April 8, 2001	Allentown, PA	
Lucifer Grimm	3	May 27, 2001	Allentown, PA	
The Mad Russian	1	June 17, 2001	Allentown, PA	
Malachi	1	August 7, 2001	Hazleton, PA	Defeated The Mad Russian in a three way match with Billy Dream.
Eric Cobain	1	December 15, 2001	Hazleton, PA	
Malachi	2	December 15, 2001	Hazleton, PA	
Although Malachi loses the title to Jersey Devil in Hazleton, Pennsylvania on January 4, 2002, the title is returned to Malachi after Jersey Devil leaves the promotion.
Kid Inferno	1	April 21, 2002	Allentown, PA	
Malachi	3	April 21, 2002	Allentown, PA	
Afa, Jr.	2	June 2, 2002	Bethlehem, PA	
Sugaa	1	June 2, 2002	Bethlehem, PA	
Afa, Jr.	3	June 2, 2002	Bethlehem, PA	
Sugaa	2	June 2, 2002	Bethlehem, PA	
Malachi	4	June 2, 2002	Bethlehem, PA	
Sugaa	3	July 12, 2002	Allentown, PA	Sugaa is later forced to vacated the title due to injury.
Crazy Ivan	1	April 26, 2003	Hazleton, PA	Defeated Boogaloo in a tournament final to win the vacant title.
Jayson	1	July 11, 2003	Allentown, PA	Defeated Crazy Ivan in a three Way match with Boogalou to win the title.
Jayson is later stripped of the title after failing to defend the title within 30 days and the WXW Hardcore Championship is vacated on August 11, 2003. The title subsequently remains inactive.
