= Gene Snitsky =

American professional wrestler (born 1970)

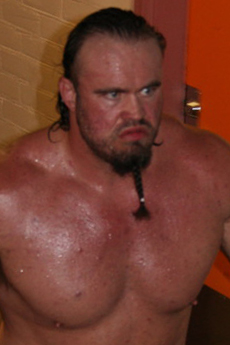
- Snitsky in 2005

Personal information
- Born: Eugene Alan Snisky; January 14, 1970 (age 56) Nesquehoning, Pennsylvania, U.S.
- Spouse: Carolyn Snisky
- Family: A. J. Petrucci (cousin)

Professional wrestling career
- Ring name(s): Gene Snitsky; Snitsky; Gene Mondo
- Billed height: 6 ft 8 in (203 cm)
- Billed weight: 307 lb (139 kg)
- Billed from: Nesquehoning, Pennsylvania
- Trained by: Afa Anoaʻi Jr. A. J. Petrucci
- Debut: 1997

Eugene Alan Snisky (born January 14, 1970) is an American professional wrestler and actor, better known by his ring name Gene Snitsky, who is best known for his time with World Wrestling Entertainment. He played college football at the University of Missouri.

== Early life ==
Snitsky attended Panther Valley High School where he played football. While in high school, Snitsky played as a punter. During his senior year, he was named All-State. Upon graduating in 1988, Snitsky signed a full scholarship to the University of Missouri where he played under offensive lineman coach and future Kansas City Chiefs Head Coach Andy Reid. After playing for the Missouri Tigers, Snitsky attended training camps with the goal of playing professional football. He was on the preseason roster in 1995 for the Birmingham Barracudas of the Canadian Football League. He eventually signed with the San Diego Chargers. During training, Snitsky re-aggravated a shoulder injury that was previously misdiagnosed from his college years. The injury effectively ended his NFL aspirations.

== Professional wrestling career ==
=== Early career (1997–2003) ===
Snisky trained with the Allentown, Pennsylvania-based World Xtreme Wrestling (WXW) and competed in the promotion under the name "Mean" Gene Snitsky. He won the tag-team championship along with his partner Robb Harper as the Twin Tackles, under a football gimmick. When he entered singles competition, he won the WXW Heavyweight Championship. In 2013, Snitsky was inducted into the WXW Hall of Fame.

=== World Wrestling Entertainment (2003–2008, 2023) ===
==== Developmental territories (2003–2004) ====
Snitsky had a tryout match with World Wrestling Entertainment (WWE) the day after winning the WXW Championship on October 20, 2003, in Wilkes-Barre, Pennsylvania at a Raw taping. Snisky, wrestling as Gene Snitsky, was defeated by fellow WXW wrestler "Smooth" Tommy Suede. It was following this match that he was signed to a developmental deal and sent to Ohio Valley Wrestling (OVW). Snisky wrestled in OVW as "Mean" Gene Mondo (a name inspired by "Mean" Gene Okerlund), and was presented as the kayfabe brother of Mike Mondo.

==== Debut and Heat mainstay (2004–2006) ====
He made his WWE debut on the September 13, 2004, edition of Raw against Kane in a no-disqualification match. As Kane, a heel at the time, prepared to injure Snitsky, he was distracted by Lita, who was (kayfabe) pregnant with Kane's child. Snitsky used the distraction to hit Kane from behind with the chair, causing Kane to fall on Lita, and causing Lita to miscarry her unborn baby. When interviewed about the incident, he claimed "it wasn't my fault" (which became his catchphrase). This facilitated a face turn for Kane and quickly established Snitsky as a full-time heel wrestler.

Snitsky, who had debuted against Kane as an apparent jobber, said years later that he was originally only supposed to make a one-night appearance, then return for OVW for more training before being called back up to the main roster on a full-time basis. The angle with Kane and Lita had gone over so well that WWE made a last-minute decision to promote him to the main roster full-time and flew him in to Raw on the company's corporate jet.

He was then situated in a major feud with Kane, which led to a match at Taboo Tuesday. In this match, Snitsky used a steel chair and crushed Kane's larynx. WWE used this angle as an excuse for Kane's absence, when in reality he was going to film the WWE-produced movie See No Evil. This feud resumed at the New Year's Revolution pay-per-view, when Kane returned and defeated Snitsky. On the January 31 edition of Raw, Snitsky lost a steel cage match to Kane to end the feud.

At Survivor Series, Snitsky had an encounter with a character similar to his own, Heidenreich, in which they both exchanged their views on each other – "I like .. your poetry."; "I .. like what you do.. to babies." — while breathing hard, both their trademark ways of talking. Snitsky was then in the main event as part of Team Triple H and facing Team Orton. During the match he was busted open by Maven before being disqualified for attacking him with a steel chair. At the 2005 Royal Rumble, the two met up again as Snitsky secretly partnered with Heidenreich, planning to interfere in Heidenreich's casket match with The Undertaker. It was later revealed that Kane was hidden in the casket, who pounced on both Snitsky and Heidenreich. They continued their fight in the crowd, before letting the casket match continue. Later that night, Snitsky competed in the Royal Rumble match in which he eliminated Paul London, before being eliminated himself by Batista.

When his rivalry with Kane ended, Snitsky had a shot at the Intercontinental Championship, which then was held by Shelton Benjamin. Snitsky lost by disqualification after hitting Benjamin with a steel chair.

He was absent from WWE television between April and May 2005 due to a blood clot in his stomach. He returned to action on May 28, and reappeared on Raw on May 30, where he began in earnest his televised feud with house show opponent Chris Benoit. The feud concerned Benoit's appearance at ECW One Night Stand; Snitsky was a "hired gun" for Eric Bischoff's Raw volunteers, brought in to try to invade the pay-per-view and ruin the ECW reunion.

Snitsky was then used by Edge and Lita to attack Kane and by Eric Bischoff as punishment to anybody that he did not like. On July 11 episode of Raw, Edge informed Snitsky that he knew about his female foot fetish and offered Snitsky to "have a go with Lita's feet" if he'd help him in a match against Kane. His history with Lita was addressed when she thanked Snitsky for his actions nine months earlier, stating that she was better off for not having given birth to Kane's offspring and then gave him a kiss as payment.

On the July 18 episode of Raw, Snitsky faced WWE Champion John Cena in the Lumberjack match where Chris Jericho picked all heel lumberjacks to make the odds unfair for Cena.

After a few weeks mainly wrestling on Heat, Snitsky formed a tag team with an initially reluctant Tyson Tomko. In their first team match together, they squashed the tag team of Viscera and Val Venis. The pair had some success as a tag team, becoming the number one contenders for the World Tag Team Championship at one point. They lost their shot at Big Show and Kane, both of whom Snitsky had feuded with in the past, and broke up in April 2006 when Tomko left WWE.

Following that, Snitsky turned face and formed a tag team with Goldust, defeating various teams of wrestlers on Heat, which eventually earned them an unsuccessful title shot against Spirit Squad. The team broke up when Goldust was released from WWE.

==== Brand switches and departure (2007–2008) ====
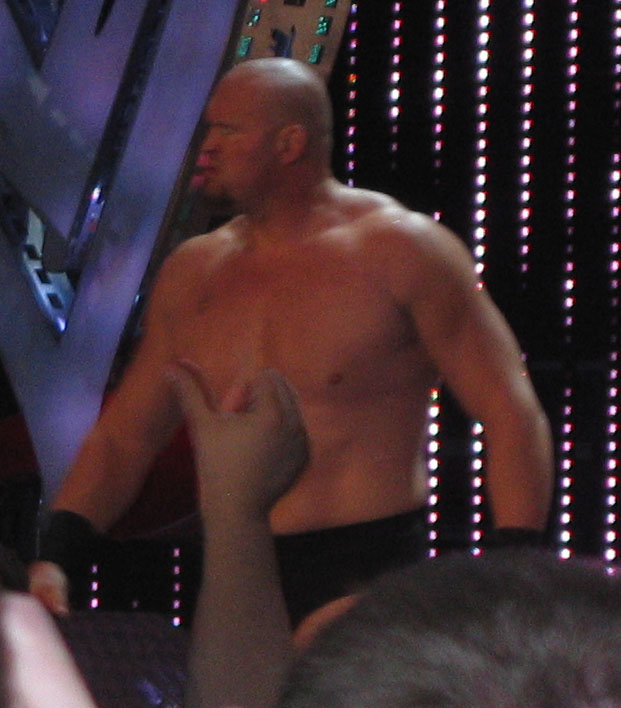
Snitsky in 2008

In 2007, Snitsky's character underwent a drastic overhaul and was now portrayed as a psychotic madman with a grotesque appearance. To this effect, all of the hair on Snitsky's head and face was shaved off (including his eyebrows), his teeth were colored a dark yellow, and several red marks were placed on his face. On the February 6, 2007, edition of ECW on Sci Fi, a vignette introduced the newly changed Snitsky to the viewers and announced him coming to ECW. Later during the same show, Snitsky debuted and assaulted the ECW World Champion Bobby Lashley. This re-established him as a monstrous heel, similar to Kane's unmasked gimmick. Over the next several weeks, Snitsky would run into the ring after matches and attack various ECW superstars, including CM Punk, Hardcore Holly, Balls Mahoney, and Matt Striker.

On April 3, 2007, Snitsky faced Holly in a match, which he won. After the match, Snitsky wedged Holly's arm in between two steel steps and repeatedly hit the steps with a steel chair, in storyline, breaking Holly's arm. Snitsky then began a short feud with Balls Mahoney. Then, he would begin another short feud with Rob Van Dam. During this feud, Snitsky would suffer his first ECW loss when he was defeated by Van Dam by disqualification.

On the June 11 edition of Raw, Snitsky was drafted from ECW back to Raw as part of the WWE Draft. Snitsky made his return to the brand on the July 9 edition of Raw, defeating Super Crazy.

Snitsky continued to go undefeated on Raw throughout the summer, having pinfall victories over various wrestlers including Super Crazy, Val Venis, Rory McAllister, and Robbie McAllister.

On August 20, Snitsky competed in his first one-on-one main-event match since losing to John Cena on Raw in 2005, once again against Cena, which he lost via disqualification when Randy Orton interfered. This was Snitsky's first loss since returning to the Raw brand. On the September 10 Raw, it was revealed that Snitsky was not Vince McMahon's illegitimate son. Snitsky returned on the October 8 Raw, defeating Val Venis, substituting for Santino Marella, who was feuding with Venis. On December 3, Snitsky was pinned by Jeff Hardy in an Intercontinental Championship match, his first pinfall loss in the year. Snitsky last appeared on WWE television on the November 24, 2008 Raw, losing an Intercontinental Championship tournament match to CM Punk. On December 11, 2008, at his request, Snitsky was released from his WWE contract.

==== One night return (2023) ====
On November 6, 2023, Snitsky made a cameo appearance on Raw backstage with Chelsea Green saying his famous line "It Wasn't My Fault".

=== Independent circuit and first retirement (2008–2018) ===
After his release, Snitsky worked in the independent circuit, mainly in World Xtreme Wrestling, where he won the WXW C4 Ultimate Heavyweight Championship on April 20, 2012. He vacated the title on November 3, 2012. On November 4, 2017, Snitsky won the Right Coast Pro Heavyweight Championship in Delaware-based promotion Right Coast Pro Wrestling. On May 19, 2018, he relinquished it due to injury. On June 22, 2018, Snitsky announced that he plans to retire from professional wrestling after working a few more shows.

=== Total Nonstop Action Wrestling (2014) ===
Snitsky, along with Rycklon, debuted for Total Nonstop Action Wrestling (TNA) on the June 25 taping of Impact Wrestling (which aired on July 24) as a heel, attacking Tommy Dreamer, Bully Ray and Devon, ostensibly aligning with Dixie Carter.

Snitsky and Rycklon were fired by Carter on the August 7, 2014, edition of Impact Wrestling. Earlier on the show they were in an Eight-Man Hardcore War as Team Dixie (EC3, Rhino, Rycklon and Snitsky) lost to Team Bully (Bully Ray, Devon, Tommy Dreamer and Al Snow).

=== Major League Wrestling (2023–present) ===
On May 24, 2023, it was announced by Major League Wrestling that Snitsky would be making his return to professional wrestling on July 8 at Never Say Never. He won his debut match by defeating Yoscifer El in a singles match. On September 3, 2023 at Fury Road, he faced off against Alex Kane, but in a losing effort.

== Other media ==
In 2009, Gene Snitsky appeared as a biker in the music video for the song "Free Your Soul" by Vyrus. He also appeared as an actor in the role of a biker and a criminal on ABC's Primetime: What Would You Do?, in February 2011. He has appeared in other episodes, including one where he played a person harassing a little person. In 2013, he was announced to play a role in the first episode of a non-profit Mighty Morphin Power Rangers fan series titled MMPR which never materialized.

Snitsky became a pitchman for Tristar Products' Power Pressure Cooker XL and has shot a series of videos for YouTube where he demonstrates how to prepare various foods in the pressure cooker. Two examples of these are a low country boil and buffalo wings.

Snitsky starred in the 2019 horror film 100 Acres of Hell as Buck Severs.

== Personal life ==
Snitsky lives with his wife Carolyn in Orwigsburg, Pennsylvania, where they often spend time outdoors. He has a father who served in the Air Force and a brother who served in the Army. After his release from WWE, Snitsky began running an Army surplus store in Hamburg, Pennsylvania, where he also spends time riding bike trails.

Snitsky has a fetish for women's feet, something he is open about.

== Filmography ==
Film
Year	Film	Role	Notes
2003	The Hero: Love Story of a Spy	Russian Terrorist	Also stuntman
2013	Bikini Girls vs. The Surf Wolf	Carny Jack	
2015	The Tour: Blunder Down Under	Himself	
2019	100 Acres of Hell	Buck Severs	Also writer, co-producer and stunt coordinator
2023	The Beast Comes at Midnight	Mr. Leavitt	
Television
Year	Title	Role	Notes
2011	What Would You Do?	Bully/Wanted Man	Episodes: "How Would You Do It?", and "Wanted Man"
2015	The Adventures of Turkey Dude	Turkey Dude	Mini-series

== Video games ==
Snitsky has also made several appearances in WWE video games, including WWE Day of Reckoning 2, WWE Smackdown! vs. Raw 2006, WWE Smackdown! vs. Raw 2007, WWE SmackDown vs. Raw 2008 and WWE Smackdown vs. Raw 2009.

== Championships and accomplishments ==
- Athletik Club Wrestling
  - ACW Tag Team Championship (1 time) – with Robb Harper
- Lancaster Championship Wrestling
  - LCW Heavyweight Championship (1 time)
- Pro Wrestling Illustrated
  - Ranked No. 83 of the top 500 singles wrestlers in the PWI 500 in 2005
- Right Coast Pro
  - RCP Heavyweight Championship (1 time)
- World Xtreme Wrestling
  - WXW Ultimate Heavyweight Championship (1 time)
  - WXW Heavyweight Championship (1 time)
  - WXW Tag Team Championship (1 time) – with Robb Harper
  - WXW Hall of Fame (class of 2013)
  - Pennsylvania sports HOF inducted 2018
