= WXW Cruiserweight Championship =

Professional wrestling championship

Details
- Promotion: Top Rope Productions; World Xtreme Wrestling
- Date established: May 24, 1997
- Date retired: April 12, 2015

Other name
- WSWF Cruiserweight Championship
Statistics
- First champion: Tommy Idol
- Final champion: Jorel Ganzy
- Most reigns: Sean Maluta (3 reigns)

This is a chronological list of WXW Cruiserweight Champions. The WXW Cruiserweight Championship is a professional wrestling title created in 1996 as part of Top Rope Productions and World Xtreme Wrestling when the promotion was renamed in 1998.

== Title history ==
=== Names ===
Name	Years
WSWF Cruiserweight Championship	May 24, 1997–November 28, 1998
WXW Cruiserweight Championship	November 28, 1998 – present

=== Reigns ===
#	Wrestler	Reigns	Date	Days held	Location	Event	Notes
1	Tommy Idol	1	May 24, 1997	49	Hazleton, PA		Defeated Bodacious Pretty Boy in a tournament final to become the first champion
2	The Perfect Creation	1	July 12, 1997	69	Nescopeck, PA		
3	Tommy Idol	2	September 19, 1997	36	Hazleton, PA		
-	Vacated	-	October 25, 1997	-	-	-	Idol suffers a broken arm during the title victory on September 19, 1997, and is forced to vacate the title
4	The Perfect Creation	2	November 7, 1997	43	Bushkill, PA		Won the title in a tournament final
5	Little Running Bear	1	December 20, 1997	21	Hazleton, PA		
6	The Perfect Creation	3	January 10, 1998	48	Freeland, PA		
7	Little Running Bear	2	February 27, 1998	57	Hazleton, PA		
8	Awol	1	April 25, 1998	42	Hazleton, PA		
9	Bas Von Kunder	1	June 6, 1998	35	Hazleton, PA		
-	Vacated	-	July 11, 1998	-	-		Kunder was stripped of the title after being deported two weeks prior. Title is renamed WXW Cruiserweight Championship
10	Kale	1	January 1999	162	Hazleton, PA	WXW	Defeated Awol in a tournament final to win the vacant title
11	John Balsamo	1	June 12, 1999	29	Hazleton, PA	WXW	This was a Triple Threat match also involving Tommy Suede
12	Kale	2	July 11, 1999	68	Allentown, PA	WXW Sportsfest 1999	
13	Afa, Jr.	1	September 17, 1999	71	Allentown, PA	WXW	
-	Vacated	-	November 27, 1999	-	-	-	Afa, Jr. vacated the title due to exceeding weight limitations
14	Zero Gravity	1	December 11, 1999	34	Hazleton, PA	WXW	Defeated Kale in a tournament title to win the vacant title
15	Shane Black (formerly Kale)	3	January 14, 2000	36	Plymouth, PA	WXW	This was a Ladder Match
16	Zero Gravity	2	February 19, 2000	13	Hazleton, PA	WXW	
-	Vacated	-	March 3, 2000	-	-	-	Title was held up in order to be contested in a Best 2 Out Of 3 Series between Zero Gravity and Shane Black
17	Shane Black	4	May 6, 2000	13	Hazleton, PA	WXW	Defeated Zero Gravity in a Best 2 Out Of 3 Series to win the held up title. The stages were Steel Cage Match (won by Shane Black), Submission Match (won by Zero Gravity) and Skyline Match (won by Shane Black). On June 2, 2000 Black defeated Sugaa to unify the WXW Cruiserweight Championship and WXW Heavyweight Championship
18	Sugaa	1	June 3, 2000	33	Allentown, PA	WXW	
-	Vacated	-	July 6, 2000	-	-	-	Sugaa relinquished the WXW Cruiserweight Championship for exceeding weight limit
19	Supreme Lee Great	1	July 6, 2000	64	Hazleton, PA	WXW	Defeated Thorn, Zero Gravity and Cody Cash in a Fatal 4-Way Match to win the vacant title
20	Zero Gravity	3	September 8, 2000	123	Allentown, PA	WXW	
21	Low Ki	1	January 9, 2001	89	Allentown, PA	WXW TV Taping	Aired on tape delay on January 14, 2001
22	Afa, Jr.	2	April 8, 2001	49	Allentown, PA	WXW Hell's Fury TV Taping	
-	Vacated	-	May 27, 2001	-	Allentown, PA	WXW Memorial Madness TV Taping	Afa, Jr. is stripped of the title due to exceeding weight limitations
23	Shane Black	5	July 13, 2001	218	Allentown, PA	WXW Sportsfest 4	Defeated Minoru Fujita and Little Guido in a Triple Threat Match to win the vacant title. Big Poppa Pete defeated Black for the title on October 13, 2001, but the decision was reversed due to Pete exceeding the weight limit by 5 pounds
-	Vacated	-	February 16, 2002	-	Hazleton, PA	WXW TV Taping	Black suffered an injury during an attack outside the arena prior to a TV Taping. WXW Commissioner Lotto Money decides to vacate the title and makes Supreme Lee Great vs. Tommy Suede, with the winner becoming the new XPW Cruiserweight Champion
24	Tommy Suede	1	February 16, 2002	105	Hazleton, PA	WXW TV Taping	Defeated Supreme Lee Great to win the vacant title
25	Zero Gravity	4	June 1, 2002	176	Hazleton, PA	WXW TV Taping	
26	Bodacious Pretty Boy	1	November 24, 2002	38	Allentown, PA	WXW TV Taping	
-	Vacated	-	2003	-	-	-	-
27	Don Crisis	1	February 8, 2003	113	Hazleton, PA	WXW TV Taping	Won a Battle-Royal to win the vacant title
28	Supreme Lee Great	2	June 1, 2003	132	Hazleton, PA	WXW TV Taping	
29	J-Busta	1	October 11, 2003	147	Hazleton, PA	WXW Action!	
30	The Prodigy	1	March 6, 2004	125	Bushkill, PA	WXW	
31	Low Ryda	1	July 9, 2004	113	Allentown, PA	WXW Sportsfest 2004	
32	Drew Blood	1	October 30, 2004	155	Bushkill, PA	WXW	Won the title in a Whirlwind Match, last eliminating Low Ryda
33	Sabian	1	April 3, 2005	56	Allentown, PA	WXW	
34	Drew Blood	2	May 29, 2005	266	Bushkill, PA	WXW	This was a Triple Threat Ladder Match also involving Neeno Capone
35	Mercedes Martinez	1	February 19, 2006	90		WXW	
36	Kris Krude	1	May 20, 2006	78		WXW	
37	Devon Moore	1	August 6, 2006	209	Allentown, PA	WXW	
38	Tonic	1	March 3, 2007	43	Allentown, PA	WXW	
39	Devon Moore	2	April 15, 2007	260	Allentown, PA	WXW	
-	Vacated	-	2007	-	-	-	
40	Jerrelle Clark	1	February 7, 2009	70	Minneola, FL	WXW	Defeated Ben Dejo, Gus Money and Mike Cruz in a Fatal 4-Way Match to win the vacant title
41	Mike Cruz	1	April 18, 2009	63	Minneola, FL	WXW	
42	Jerrelle Clark	2	June 20, 2009	98	Minneola, FL	WXW	This was a Last Man Standing Match
43	Brett Thunder	1	September 26, 2009	147	Minneola, FL	WXW 1 Year in Florida Anniversary	This was a Fatal 4-Way Match also involving Gus Money and Mike Cruz
44	Sean Maluta	1	February 20, 2010	49	Minneola, FL	WXW	
45	Gus Money	1	April 10, 2010	70	Minneola, FL	WXW Xtreme War	
46	Sean Maluta	2	June 19, 2010	98	Minneola, FL	WXW	This was a No Disqualification Match
47	TNT Molley	1	September 25, 2010	56	The Villages, FL	WXW	
48	Nick Nero	1	November 20, 2010	98	Minneola, FL	WXW	This was a Triple Threat Match also involving Sean Maluta
49	Sean Maluta	3	February 26, 2011	105	Minneola, FL	WXW	
50	Brent Dail	1	June 11, 2011	49	Minneola, FL	WXW	
-	Vacated	-	July 30, 2011	-	-	-	Title vacated when Dail won the WXW Television Championship
51	Jaxen Blade	1	July 13, 2013	182	Minneola, FL	WXW	
52	Jorel Ganzy	1	January 11, 2014	35	Minneola, FL	WXW	
53	Carlos Rivera	1	February 15, 2014	43	Minneola, FL	WXW	
54	Jaxen Blade	2	March 30, 2014	265	Minneola, FL	WXW	This was a Fatal 4-Way Match also involving Ace Radic and Jorel Granzy
55	Hans Schulz	1	December 20, 2014	113	Minneola, FL	WXW	
56	Jorel Ganzy	2	April 12, 2015	4057+	Minneola, FL	WXW	

== List of combined reigns ==
Key

Symbol	Meaning
	Indicates the current champion
<1	The reign is shorter than one day

As of May 21, 2026.

Rank	Wrestler	# of Reigns	Combined Days
1	Jorel Ganzy	2	4092+
2	Kale/Shane Black	5	497
3	Devon Moore	2	469
4	Jaxen Blade	4	447
5	Drew Blood	2	421
6	Zero Gravity	4	346
7	Sean Maluta	3	252
8	Supreme Lee Great	2	196
9	Jerrelle Clark	2	168
10	The Perfect Creation	3	160
11	J-Busta	1	147
11	Brett Thunder	1	147
13	The Prodigy	1	125
14	Afa, Jr.	2	120
15	Don Crisis	1	113
15	Low Ryda	1	113
17	Tommy Suede	1	105
18	Nick Nero	1	98
19	Mercedes Martinez	1	90
20	Low Ki	1	89
21	Tommy Idol	2	85
22	Little Running Bear	2	78
22	Kris Krude	1	78
23	Gus Money	1	70
24	Mike Cruz	1	63
25	Sabian	1	56
25	TNT Molley	1	56
26	Brent Dail	1	49
27	Tonic	1	43
28	Awol	1	42
29	Bodacious Pretty Boy	1	38
30	Bas Von Kunder	1	35
31	Sugaa	1	33
32	John Balsamo	1	29
33	Carlos Rivera	1	17
