= York County School of Technology =

Location
- 2179 S Queen St, York, PA 17402; York, Pennsylvania 17402; United States
- Coordinates: 39.9302°N 76.6847°W

Information
- Type: Public vocational high school
- Established: 1969
- NCES School ID: 422681005168
- Principal: Tiffany Henry, Sarah Koveleski, Andrew Loehwing
- Teaching staff: 112.00 (on an FTE basis)
- Grades: 9-12
- Enrollment: 1,621 (2023-2024)
- Student to teacher ratio: 14.47 (2023-2024)
- Colors: Green and white
- Mascot: Spartan
- Newspaper: York Tech Times
- Yearbook: The Epic
- Website: www.ytech.edu

York County School of Technology (YCST, formerly York County Area Vocational-Technical School) is a public vocational high school in York, Pennsylvania, United States. The school accepts students from 14 sending school districts within York County.

The technical areas, commonly called "shops", are divided into three academies: Arts and Human Services, Engineering and Construction, and Manufacturing and Transportation. The school colors and mascot are identical to those of York College of Pennsylvania.

== Programs ==
York County School of Technology offers the following twenty-six technical programs:

- Architecture & Construction Management
- Automotive Technology
- Carpentry
- Collision Repair Technology
- Commercial & Advertising Art
- Communication Technology
- Computer Programming & Interactive Media
- Computer Systems Technology
- Construction Trades
- Criminal Justice
- Culinary Arts
- Dental Assisting
- Diesel Technology
- Early Childhood Education
- Electrical Occupations
- Engineering & Advanced Manufacturing
- Exercise & Sports Science
- Heating, Ventilation, & Air Conditioning/HVAC (includes Plumbing)
- K-12 Teacher Development
- Landscaping & Agriculture
- Licensed Cosmetology
- Medical Professions
- Network Systems & Cyber Security
- Powersports & Engine Technology
- Precision Machining Technology
- Welding & Metal Fabrication

Furter information on these technical areas can be found on York Tech's official website.

=== Program Rotations ===
Certain programs offered include a rotation between similar programs, in which students take courses in each program before applying for full-time entrance into one path based on merit and other criteria. Students who are not approved for their first choice will be assigned to one of the other courses in the rotation.

==== Information Technology Rotation ====
Students interested in Computer Programming & Interactive Media, Computer Systems Technology, or Network Systems & Cyber Security will complete a rotation between the courses during their 9th and 10th grade year.

==== Construction Trades Rotation ====
Students interested in Carpentry, Construction Trades, Electrical Occupations, or HVAC will take courses in all 4 programs for the first marking period.

==== Graphic Arts Rotation ====
Students interested in Commercial & Advertising Art or Communication Technology will take courses in both programs for their 9th and 10th grade year.

==== Engineering Rotation ====
Students interested in Engineering & Advanced Manufacturing or Precision Machining Technology will take courses in both programs for the first 3 marking periods.

==== Education Rotation ====
Students interested in Early Childhood Education or K-12 Teacher Development will take Education Pathway courses for their first two years at York Tech

== Demographics ==
York County School of Technology receives students from all of the fourteen school districts in York County. This includes students from private schools and cyber schools.

Populations of Students from Sending Schools, 2018-2019 School Year
Sending School	Number of Students	Percentage
Central York School District	95	5.7%
Dallastown Area School District	120	7.1%
Dover Area School District	87	5.2%
Eastern York School District	73	4.3%
Hanover Public School District	27	1.6%
Northeastern York School District	91	5.4%
Red Lion Area School District	223	13.3%
South Eastern School District	105	6.3%
South Western School District	57	3.4%
Southern York County School District	46	2.7%
Spring Grove Area School District	113	6.7%
West York Area School District	104	6.2%
School District of the City of York	1,000	50%
York Suburban School District	38	2.3%
Total	1679	100%

Percentage of Enrolled Students by Race, 2018-2019 School Year
Race	Percentage
American Indian/Alaskan Native	0.1%
Asian	0.6%
Black	9.8%
Native Hawaiian or other Pacific Islander	0%
Hispanic	17.3%
White	61.8%
2 or more races	10.3%
Total	100%

== Renovation ==
In 2006 York County School of Technology underwent construction and acquired two additional wings, which are now the "Manufacturing and Transportation" and the "Engineering and Construction" academies. The "Arts and Human Services" academy was remodeled during the school year of 2007.

In 2019 construction began on a new indoor track and athletic facilities. It was to be completed in early 2020 but due to COVID-19 it was delayed and it was finished in 2021. The new addition was named the "Fieldhouse".
