= WXW Tag Team Championship =

Professional wrestling tag team championship

Details
- Promotion: Top Rope Productions/World Xtreme Wrestling
- Date established: October 26, 1996
- Current champion: Controversial Inc.

Other name
- Top Rope Tag Team Championship
Statistics
- First champions: Hard Rock Hamilton and Jay Love

This is a chronological list of WXW Tag Team Champions. The WXW Tag Team Championship is a professional wrestling tag team title created in 1996 as part of for Top Rope Productions (later renamed World Xtreme Wrestling).

== Title history ==
No.	Champion	Reign	Date	Days held	Location	Notes
1	Hard Rock Hamilton and Sweet Daddy Jay Love	1	August 31, 1996	(Note: The exact date is unknown, and thus the reign length cannot be determined.)	Unknown	
—	Vacated	—	Unknown	—	—	Hamilton and Love vacated the titles at an unknown date
2	The Lumberjaks (Jake Molsonn and Jak Molsonn	1	October 26, 1996	128	Hazleton, Pennsylvania	Defeated Hardened Steel (Dan Steel and Steve Smyth) to win the vacant championship
3	Love Connection (Jay Love and Georgie Love)	1	March 3, 1997	82	Lebanon, Pennsylvania	
4	Samoan Gangstas (L.A. Smooth and Matty Smalls)	1	May 24, 1997		Hazleton, Pennsylvania	
—	Vacated	—	June 1997	—	—	The title is declared vacant after the Samoan Gangstas are temporarily suspended
5	Siberian Express (The Mad Russian and The Russian Eliminator)	1	June 27, 1997	82	Hazleton, Pennsylvania	Defeated The Lumberjaks and Love Connection in a three-way match to win the vacant titles
6	Samoan Gangstas (L.A. Smooth and Matty Smalls)	2	September 17, 1997	192	Hazleton, Pennsylvania	
—	Vacated	—	March 28, 1998	—	—	The title is declared vacant after L.A. Smooth and Matty Smalls begin feuding and Smalls is forced to leave the promotion after losing a Loser Leaves Town match to L.A. Smooth
7	The Grungers (Gutterboy and Skank)	1	May 23, 1998		Hazleton, Pennsylvania	Defeated Love Connection in a tournament final
—	Vacated	—	September 1998	—	—	
8	Samoan Gangstas (L.A. Smooth and Matty Smalls	3	October 13, 1998		Hazleton, Pennsylvania	Defeated The Bad Crew (Dog and Rose) in a tournament final
—	Vacated	—	November 1998	—	—	The title is declared vacant after the team splits up. During this time, Top Rope Productions is renamed World Xtreme Wrestling in November 1998
11	Wild Things (Arick Von Erick and Vincent Goodnite)	1	February 20, 1999	42	Hazleton, Pennsylvania	Won titles in a tournament final
12	Latin Hit Squad (Nuisance and Puerto Rican Chile)	1	April 3, 1999	21	Hazleton, Pennsylvania	Defeated Vincent Goodnite and Sweet Daddy Jay Love (substituting for Arick Von Erick) after Sweet Daddy Jay Love attacked Goodnite
13	Wild Things (Arick Von Erick and Vincent Goodnite)	2	April 24, 1999	78	Hazleton, Pennsylvania	Won titles in a tournament final
14	Latin Hit Squad (Nuisance and Puerto Rican Chile)	3	July 11, 1999	62	Hazleton, Pennsylvania	Defeated Vincent Goodnite and Sweet Daddy Jay Love (substituting for Arick Von Erick) after Sweet Daddy Jay Love attacked Goodnite
15	American Hunk Society; Mark the Body and Tommy Suede	1	September 11, 1999	147	Hazleton, Pennsylvania	Defeated the Latin Hit Squad in a three-way match also involving The Grungers
16	Old School (The Mad Russian and Salvatore Bellomo)	1	February 5, 2000	118	Hazleton, Pennsylvania	Defeated Vincent Goodnite and Sweet Daddy Jay Love (substituting for Arick Von Erick) after Sweet Daddy Jay Love attacked Goodnite
17	American Hunk Society (Mark the Body and Tommy Suede)	2	June 2, 2000	35	Hazleton, Pennsylvania	
18	The Showstoppers (Lucifer Grimm and Afa Jr.)	1	July 7, 2000	1	Hazleton, Pennsylvania	Defeated Tommy Suede and Kevin The Behemoth (substituting for Mark The Body) in a three-way match also involving the Latin Hit Squad
19	American Hunk Society (Mark the Body and Tommy Suede)	3	July 8, 2000	1	Hazleton, Pennsylvania	
20	Latin Hit Squad (Nuisance and Puerto Rican Chile)	3	July 9, 2000	68	Hazleton, Pennsylvania	
21	Moondogs 2000 (Moondog Wenzel and Jak Molsonn)	1	September 15, 2000		Hazleton, Pennsylvania	
22	New Jersey Hit Squad (Monsta Mack and Mafia)	1	July 11, 1999		Hazleton, Pennsylvania	
23	Moondogs 2000 (Moondog Wenzel and Jak Molsonn)	2	April 24, 1999		Hazleton, Pennsylvania	
24	Neil & Bob (Bob Hansen and Nicky Ice)	1	April 24, 1999		Hazleton, Pennsylvania	Won titles in a tournament final
—	Vacated	—	October 11, 1999	—	—	Although Twin Tackles (Gene Snisky and Rob Harper defeated Bob and Weave (substituting for Neil) in Hazleton, Pennsylvania on October 11, Commissioner Lotto Money ruled that Weave was the defending tag champion and the titles were returned to Neil & Bob on October 13, 2001
25	Twin Tackles (Gene Snisky and Rob Harper)	1	October 13, 2001		Hazleton, Pennsylvania	
26	New Jersey Hit Squad (Monsta Mack and Mafia)	1	February 10, 2002		Hazleton, Pennsylvania	Defeated Vincent Goodnite and Sweet Daddy Jay Love (substituting for Arick Von Erick) after Sweet Daddy Jay Love attacked Goodnite
27	Big Poppa Pete and Big Dawg Molsonn	1	July 12, 2002		Hazleton, Pennsylvania	Defeated Vincent Goodnite and Sweet Daddy Jay Love (substituting for Arick Von Erick) after Sweet Daddy Jay Love attacked Goodnite
—	Vacated	—	October 20, 2002	—	—	The Tag Team titles are declared vacant after Big Poppa Pete attacked Big Dawg Molsonn during a match in Bethlehem, Pennsylvania
28	Supreme Lee Great and Tommy Suede (4)	1	November 24, 2002		Hazleton, Pennsylvania	Defeated Los Lunatics to win the vacant tag team title
29	Moondogs 2000 (Moondog Wenzel and Jak Molsonn)	3	January 4, 2003		Hazleton, Pennsylvania	Won titles in a tournament final
30	Los Lunatics (Eddie Guapo and Low Ryda)	1	March 8, 2003		Hazleton, Pennsylvania	
31	The Double Threat (Jake Bishop and Cliff Compton)	1	July 11, 2003		Allentown, Pennsylvania	
—	Stripped	—	September 14, 2003	—	—	The Tag Team titles are declared vacant after Double Threat (Jake Bishop and Cliff Compton) are stripped of the titles for failing to defend them within a 30-day period
32	All Money Is Legal (K. Pusha and Dizzie)	1	October 19, 2003		Sciota, Pennsylvania	Defeated Los Lunatics (Eddie Guapo and Low Ryda) in a Best of Five Series to win the vacant tag team titles
33	Mark Gore and Anthony Michaels	1	January 9, 2004		Sciota, Pennsylvania	Defeated All Money Is Legal in a three-way match with The All-Knighters
34	Nuisance (5) and Sugaa	1	March 12, 2004		Sciota, Pennsylvania	
—	Vacated	—	May 2004	—	—	
35	The Untouchables	1	May 29, 2004		Sciota, Pennsylvania	Defeated the Dirty Rotten Scoundrels (EC Negro & KC Blade) to win the vacant tag team title
36	Dirty Rotten Scoundrels ([E.C. Negro and K.C. Blade)	1	July 31, 2004		Sciota, Pennsylvania	
37	The Untouchables	2	August 28, 2004		Sciota, Pennsylvania	Defeated E.C. Negro in a handicap match after K.C. Blade was unable to wrestle due to an injury
38	Cabbie and C.J. O'Doyle	1	October 29, 2004		Sciota, Pennsylvania	Defeated The Untouchables in a "Scotia Street Fight"
39	Greg Matthews and Kevin Matthews	1	January 14, 2005		Sciota, Pennsylvania	Defeated C.J. O'Doyle and Sinister X (substituting for an injured Cabbie) in a four-way match with All Money Is Legal and Eddie Guapo and Havoc
40	The Untouchables	3	April 3, 2005		Allentown, Pennsylvania	
41	Tonic and The Dynamic Sensation	1	July 9, 2005		Bushkill, Pennsylvania	
