= Afa Anoaʻi Jr. =

American professional wrestler (born 1984)

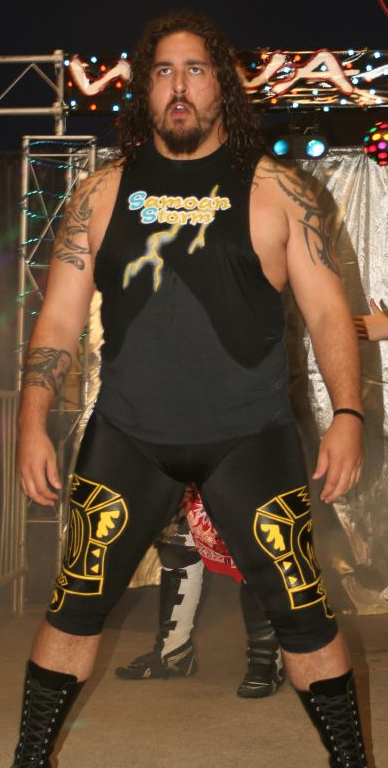
- Anoaʻi in 2009

Personal information
- Born: October 6, 1984 (age 42) Hamden, Connecticut, U.S.
- Education: University of Connecticut
- Children: 2
- Parent: Afa Anoa'i (father)
- Family: Anoaʻi

Professional wrestling career
- Ring name(s): Afa; Afa Jr. Mai Tai Anoaʻi; Manu
- Billed height: 6 ft 2 in (1.88 m)
- Billed weight: 290 lb (130 kg)
- Billed from: Lehigh Valley, Pennsylvania
- Trained by: Afa Anoaʻi; Lloyd Anoaʻi; Samula Anoaʻi
- Debut: August 28, 1998

Afa Anoaʻi Jr. (born October 6, 1984) is an American professional wrestler and promoter. He is best known for his work with the professional wrestling promotion World Wrestling Entertainment (WWE) in the late 2000s with the ring name Manu. He is also owner of BattleField Pro Wrestling, a promotion based in Pennsylvania.

== Early life and education ==
Anoaʻi attended Freedom High School in Bethlehem Township, Pennsylvania, where he competed in the Eastern Pennsylvania Conference, known for producing top athletic talent in football, wrestling, and other sports. Anoai's high school football coach Jim Morgans described him as "the best defensive lineman I've coached." As a senior, Anoaʻi was named one of the 100 best football players in the United States by analyst Tom Lemming.

Following graduation from Freedom High School, Anoaʻi attended Fork Union Military Academy as a postgraduate to study and play football. In 2003, he played in the All-American Bowl. Upon graduating, Anoaʻi played football at the University of Connecticut for a year.

He began training as a professional wrestler under his father, Afa, and brothers, Lloyd and Samula. He made his debut on August 28, 1998, at the age of 14, winning a battle royal in Austria.

== Professional wrestling career ==
=== World Xtreme Wrestling (1998–2006) ===
In 1998, Anoa'i joined the family professional wrestling promotion World Xtreme Wrestling, where he formed a stable with his brothers, Samu and Lloyd Anoa'i, known as Sons of Samoa. Anoa'i went on to win numerous championships.

=== World Wrestling Entertainment (2006–2009) ===
==== Development territories (2006–2007) ====
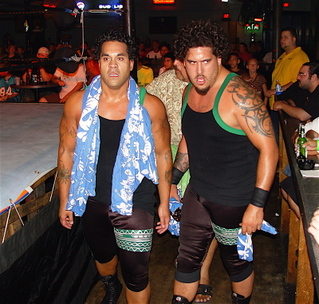
Anoa'i (right) with Sonny Siaki as the Samoan Fight Club in August 2007

In October 2006, Anoa'i received a try-out with World Wrestling Entertainment (WWE), held at the Deep South Wrestling developmental territory. Later that month, Anoa'i signed with WWE, going under his father's ring name, "Afa". He went on to wrestle for Deep South Wrestling. He initially was introduced as part of the stable Urban Assault, organized by Sonny Siaki, Eric Pérez, and Tyrus. They later lost to the Shane Twins, after which Afa replaced him. Urban Assault dissolved after Afa and Siaki abandoned Perez during a match against Doc Gallows and Tyrus.

Siaki and Afa reorganized as the Samoan Fight Club. Anoa'i then wrestled for WWE's new developmental territory, Florida Championship Wrestling (FCW), where he continued teaming with Siaki under their Samoan Fight Club name. In 2007, however, their team was disbanded when Siaki was released from his contract following family issues. In October 2007, Afa Jr. defeated Davey Boy Smith Jr. by countout in the United Kingdom to become the new FCW Southern Heavyweight Champion. In September, Afa Jr. began to work matches in Ohio Valley Wrestling, forming a tag team with fellow Samoan family member Matt Anoa'i. Their team was dubbed Sons of Samoa, which also was a stable that Afa Jr. formed when he was wrestling in World Xtreme Wrestling.

==== Main roster (2007–2009) ====
On November 19, 2007, Anoa'i made his debut on WWE under the name Mai Tai Anoa'i in a losing effort against Jim Duggan at WWE Heat. Anoa'i was later suspended by WWE for 30 days, on March 20, 2008, for violating WWE's Wellness Policy.

At Unforgiven in September 2008, Anoa'i made his debut on the full-time roster under the name "Manu". He aligned himself with Cody Rhodes and Ted DiBiase, attacking Cryme Tyme after their World Tag Team Championship match. Later that night, the three helped Randy Orton attack the World Heavyweight Champion CM Punk and Kofi Kingston. On the September 8, 2008 edition of WWE Raw, Manu, Rhodes, and DiBiase defeated Cryme Tyme and Kofi Kingston in a six-man tag team match. On the November 17 episode of Raw, Anoaʻi made his singles debut in a losing effort against Batista.

Rhodes, DiBiase, and Manu entered a storyline with Randy Orton in which Orton was constantly criticizing and insulting them, with Orton attacking DiBiase on the November 3 episode of Raw. Manu and Rhodes accepted Orton's offer for an alliance in the following weeks, and the trio dubbed themselves The Legacy.

After Orton grew tired of The Legacy losing matches, he scheduled a test for each member on the December 29 episode of Raw. Manu failed to pass his test after losing to ECW Champion Matt Hardy and was subsequently kicked out of the group, as his former companions Rhodes and Sim Snuka turned their backs on him. Later, Snuka also got kicked out of the group, and the two quickly reunited. They sought revenge against Orton and Rhodes on the January 12, 2009 episode of Raw with the aid of returning Ted DiBiase. DiBiase betrayed them, however, and joined The Legacy with Orton and Rhodes.

Anoa'i was released from his WWE contract on February 23, 2009.

=== Independent circuit (2009–present) ===
On April 18, 2009, two months after being released by WWE, Anoa'i returned to the independent circuit at a World Xtreme Wrestling (WXW) show. He reformed the Sons of Samoa tag team with Samu, and the pair competed as a tag team throughout the rest of 2009. In 2010, Anoa'i competed for the Belgian Catch Wrestling Federation and NWA Dawg Pound.

On February 9, 2013, Afa Jr. and L. A. Smooth, as The Sons of Samoa, won the WWC World Tag Team Championship. They lost their titles at Camino a la Gloria on March 30, 2013. However, they won them back on June 29, 2013 at Summer Madness. They lost the title at WWC 40 Aniversario to Chicano and Abbad. They regained them again on November 16, 2013 at Crossfire. However, they lost the title at Euphoria Day 2 against Xix Xavant and Chicano.

At the Regional Championship Wrestling event Rumblemania 9 in Reading, Pennsylvania on March 15, 2014, Manu and RC beat Rob Noxious in a respect match. This was a hardcore match that ended up going all over the building; after the match, Manu shook hands with Noxious and beat up RC, his manager.

Since 2014, Afa has been attached to Pennsylvania Premiere Wrestling (PPW) in Hazleton, Pennsylvania, capturing the promotions Heavyweight Championship and its No Limits Championship. Afa captured the PPW Title from his nephew Lance Anoaʻi and retained the title against contenders, including Dan Maff and Samoa Joe. Afa defeated Al Snow at the December PPW Event to retain the PPW No Limits Title. In July 2017, he appeared on an NWA card in Morgan City, Louisiana, where he was defeated by NWA North American heavyweight champion Mustang Mike.

In October 2024, Afa was involved in a controversial incident during an Outlaw Pro Wrestling event in which he appeared to legitimately strike his opponent during a match. The match was stopped by the referee, and Afa subsequently delivered a promo criticizing his opponent for mocking his Samoan heritage. Wrestling media later reported, citing sources, that the confrontation was unscripted, with the 18-year-old opponent reportedly suffering facial swelling and bruising to his torso. The circumstances of the incident remained disputed, with some viewers questioning whether it had been partially or entirely planned.

== Personal life ==
Anoaʻi is a member of the Anoaʻi family, a Samoan family of wrestlers. He is the son of Afa Anoaʻi and the younger brother of Samu and L.A. Smooth. He is related to Roman Reigns, The Rock, The Usos, Yokozuna, Umaga, Rikishi, and others. He has Samoan tattoos on his arms. He has two children.

Anoa'i appeared in WWE's Most Wanted Treasures episode Samoan Dynasty in 2023 which was filmed in Pennsylvania in fall of 2022.

On September 23, 2023, Anoa'i was hospitalized for a "complex cardiac issue."

=== Legal issues ===
In August 2003, Anoaʻi was implicated as the getaway driver of a duo who committed an armed robbery in Bethlehem Township, Pennsylvania, stealing money and jewellery worth over $150,000 and stabbing an elderly female resident. Anoaʻi pleaded no contest to the charge of receipt of stolen property and was sentenced to two years probation.

== Championships and accomplishments ==
- Defiant Pro Wrestling
  - DPW Heavyweight Championship (1 time)
- Florida Championship Wrestling
  - FCW Southern Heavyweight Championship (1 time)
- Independent Superstars of Professional Wrestling
  - ISPW Light Heavyweight Championship (1 time)
- Jersey Championship Wrestling
  - JCW Television Championship (1 time)
- Outlaw Wrestling
  - Outlaw Wrestling Championship (1 time)
- Pennsylvania Premiere Wrestling
  - PPW Heavyweight Championship (1 time)
  - PPW No Limits Championship (1 time)
- Pro Wrestling Illustrated
  - PWI ranked him #368 of the top 500 singles wrestlers in the PWI 500 in 2008
- World Wrestling Council
  - WWC World Tag Team Championship (3 times) – with L.A. Smooth
- World Wrestling Professionals
  - WWP World Tag Team Championship (1 time) – with L.A. Smooth
- World Xtreme Wrestling
  - WXW Cruiserweight Championship (2 times)
  - WXW Hardcore Championship (3 times)
  - WXW Heavyweight Championship (1 time)
  - WXW Tag Team Championship (3 times) – with Lucifer Grim (1), L.A. Smooth (1) and Sean Maluta (1)
  - WXW Television Championship (1 time)
  - WXW Ultimate Heavyweight Championship (2 times)
  - Wild Samoan Tag Team Tournament (2017) – with Sean Maluta
