= Sciota, Pennsylvania =

Unincorporated community in Pennsylvania, US

- Unincorporated community
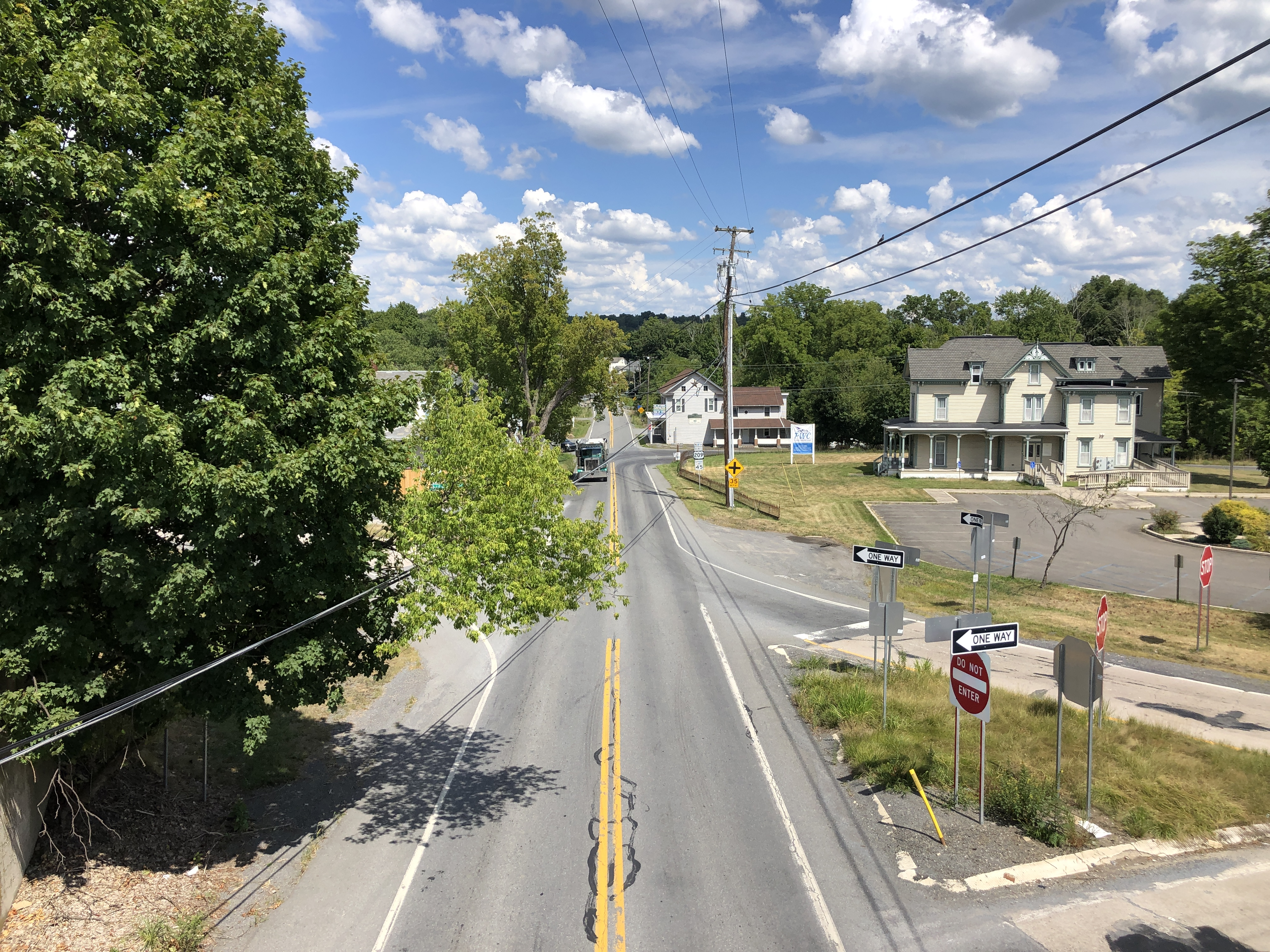
- Sciota as seen from US 209

- Location within Pennsylvania
- Coordinates: 40°55′46″N 75°18′58″W
- Country: United States
- State: Pennsylvania
- County: Monroe
- Township: Hamilton
- Elevation: 554 ft (169 m)
- Time zone: UTC-5 (Eastern (EST))
  - Summer (DST): UTC-4 (EDT)
- ZIP code: 18354
- Area codes: 570 and 272
- GNIS feature ID: 1187146

Sciota is an unincorporated community in Hamilton Township in Monroe County, Pennsylvania, United States. Sciota is located near the interchange between the southern terminus of U.S. Route 209 Business and U.S. Route 209. The historic Fenner–Snyder Mill is located in Sciota.
