= World Xtreme Wrestling =

American independent professional wrestling promotion

- Acronym: WXW
- Founded: 1996
- Defunct: April 13, 2024
- Style: professional wrestling
- Headquarters: Minneola, Florida; Allentown, Pennsylvania
- Founder: Afa Anoa'i
- Owner(s): Afa Anoa'i (1996–February 2024); Afa Jr. (since April 2024)
- Parent: Top Rope Productions (1996–98); World Xtreme Wrestling (1998–2024)
- Website: WXWwrestling.com; WXW Womens League

World Xtreme Wrestling (WXW) was a Florida-based independent professional wrestling promotion which has held events across the United States and toured in Japan, the Middle East and South Pacific region including American Samoa and Guam.

The promotion is associated with Afa Anoa'i's Wild Samoan Pro Wrestling Training Center in Minneola, Florida, and students who have competed for the promotion include Batista, Chris Kanyon, Billy Kidman, Gene Snitsky and cousins Jamal (known as Umaga) and Rosey of Three Minute Warning. Court Bauer, who would later become a member of the WWE creative team, was a booker for the promotion during the mid-1990s.

The promotion features in the film The Wrestler, where Mickey Rourke's character "Randy 'The Ram' Robinson" wrestles Tommy Rotten (portrayed by WXW wrestler Tommy Suede).

== History ==
=== Trans World Wrestling Federation ===
Originally formed in 1970 as the Trans World Wrestling Federation in association with the original Wild Samoan Pro Wrestling Training Center, the promotion's early history is unrecorded. However, Jules Strongbow and Yukon Jack have both been credited as former heavyweight champions. During the early 1990s, the promotion's roster included independent wrestlers such as Bam Bam Bigelow, Chief Dave Foxx, Billy Kidman, Chris Kanyon, Tony Stetson and Glen Osbourne.

=== World Xtreme Wrestling ===
World Xtreme Wrestling was established in 1996 as a continuation of the Trans World Wrestling Federation and continued to be owned and operated by Afa Anoa'i. In 1998, the promotion held its first live televised supercard Sportsfest '98 in Allentown, Pennsylvania which featured several wrestlers from the World Wrestling Federation including Rocky Maivia, Mankind, Owen Hart, D'Lo Brown as well as former WWF wrestlers Doink the Clown, King Kong Bundy and The Bushwhackers.

Shortly after the close of Extreme Championship Wrestling (ECW), several former ECW wrestlers including Mikey Whipwreck, Devon Storm, Little Guido, The Sandman and Tommy Dreamer "invaded" Sportsfest 2001. In the main event, The Sandman and Tommy Dreamer were defeated by Samu and Mana.

During that year, the promotion established a women's division with Kattra becoming the first WXW Women's Champion. She eventually was stripped of the title in March 2001 after failing to defend the championship. Although BellaDonna won the title after defeating Jessica Dally on March 9, the title was again vacated. The title remained inactive for several months, but the division was reactivated following the WXW Women's ELITE 8 Tournament in Danbury, Connecticut on September 25, 2002, with Cindy Rogers winning the WXW Women's title in a battle royal at Sportsfest 2003.

Although the promotion had held live television tapings at past events, WXW began airing a weekly television program, WXW Rage TV in January 2002 featuring a variety of WXW talent, including Afa, Afa Jr., L.A. Smooth, Showtime Shane Black, Havoc, Nuissance, Supreme Lee Great, and Samu. Rage TV features a rotating commentary team that has included Doc Daniels, The Bald Guy, Ben Miller, Saul Steinberk, Gerry Strauss and Nate Stein. Other independent wrestlers who have appeared on Rage TV include Salvatore Bellomo, Low Ki, John Rambo and Slyk Wagner Brown.

In early 2002, WXW promoted its first tour overseas and appeared for U.S. troops stationed in the Middle East, including Afghanistan. In August 2002, the promotion held a second tour in Asia and the South Pacific appearing for one month in Japan, Okinawa, Korea, Guam and Hawaii.

In late 2004, WXW expanded and began holding events in Florida near the original Wild Samoan Pro Wrestling Training Center in Pensacola. WXW began holding all of its events in Minneola, Florida, and broadcasting Rage TV on their website. A new branch of WXW, called WXW C4 was created and promotes regular events in Allentown, Pennsylvania. WXW C4 is run by Samu and Afa Jr. and has a weekly television show, Blast TV.

In February 2024, Afa Jr. announced the promotion will close on April 13. However, on April 14, 2024, Afa Jr. confirmed via his social media that he will be taking full control of the promotion though the promotion has not held a single event since.

== Women's ELITE 8 Tournament ==
The Women's Elite 8 Tournament is a tournament formed to offer a platform for top female wrestlers. There have been eight annual tournaments starting September 27, 2002 in Danbury, Connecticut. The last tournament was held in 2009.

=== 2002 ===
September 27, 2002 in Danbury, Connecticut

No.	Results	Stipulations
1	Griffin defeated Jessica Dally	Singles match
2	Mercedes Martinez defeated Katarina Heiss	Singles match
3	Valentina vs. Traci Brooks ended in a draw	Singles match As a result of the draw, both wrestlers advanced.
4	Ariel defeated BellaDawna	Singles match
5	Gail Kim defeated Nikki Roxx	Singles match
6	Traci Brooks defeated Ariel	Singles match
7	Griffin defeated Valentina	Singles match
8	Gail Kim defeated April Hunter	Singles match
9	Mercedes Martinez defeated Griffin	Singles match
10	Traci Brooks defeated Gail Kim	Singles match
11	Traci Brooks defeated Mercedes Martinez	Singles match with Steve Wilkos as the special enforcer

=== 2003 ===
November 21, 2003 in Sciota, Pennsylvania

First round
Jessica Dally and Sarah Stock
(Note: Other competitors were Alere Little Feather, BellaDawna, Frankie V, Luscious Lily, ODB, and Tara Charisma)	Battle royal

Quarterfinals
Jessica Dally
Sarah Stock	Pin
April Hunter
Ariel	Pin
Allison Danger
Angel Williams	Pin
Beth Phoenix
Psycho Bitch	Pin

Semifinals
Sarah Stock
April Hunter	Pin
Angel Williams
Beth Phoenix	Pin

Finals
April Hunter
Beth Phoenix	Pin

=== 2004 ===
October 9, 2004 in Sciota, Pennsylvania

Quarterfinals
Alere Little Feather
Amber O'Neal	Pin
Cindy Rogers
Krissy Vaine	Pin
Allison Danger
Simply Luscious	Pin
Lacy
Mercedes Martinez	Sub

Semifinals
Alere Little Feather
Krissy Vaine	Pin
Allison Danger
Mercedes Martinez	Sub

Final
Alere Little Feather
Mercedes Martinez	Pin

=== 2005 ===
October 23, 2005 in Allentown, Pennsylvania

Quarterfinals
Alicia
Ariel	Pin
Nikki Roxx
Phoenix	Pin
Allison Danger
Cindy Rogers	Sub
Melissa Coates
21st Century Fox	Sub

Semifinals
Alicia
Phoenix	Pin
Cindy Rogers
Melissa Coates	Pin

Final
Alicia
Cindy Rogers	Pin

=== 2006 ===
October 14, 2006 in Allentown, Pennsylvania

Quarterfinals
Jana
Kacee Carlisle	Pin
Faith
Lexi Lane	Pin
Cha Cha
Hailey Hatred	Pin
Amber O'Neal
Mercedes Martinez	Pin

Semifinals
Kacee Carlisle
Faith	Pin
Hailey Hatred
Mercedes Martinez	Pin

Final
Kacee Carlisle
Mercedes Martinez	Pin

=== 2007 ===
November 10, 2007 in Coplay, Pennsylvania with Sunny as the special guest referee for the finals

Quarterfinals
Jana
Monique	Pin
Annie Social
Discord	Pin
Becky Bayless
Cindy Rogers	Double pin
Alexa Thatcher
Hailey Hatred	Pin

Semifinals
Monique
Annie Social	Pin
Cindy Rogers
Becky Bayless and Hailey Hatred	Pin

Final
Annie Social
Cindy Rogers	Pin

=== 2008 ===
November 15, 2008 in Leesburg, Florida

Quarterfinals
Becky Bayless
Rain	Pin
Ferrari
Mercedes Martinez	Pin
Betsy Ruth
Leva	Pin
Amber O'Neal
Lexie Fyfe	Pin

Semifinals
Rain
Mercedes Martinez	Pin
Leva
Lexie Fyfe	Pin

Final
Mercedes Martinez
Lexie Fyfe	Pin

=== 2009 ===
November 14, 2009 in Minneola, Florida

Quarterfinals
Lace
Lorelei Lee	Pin
Rain
Sarona Snuka	Pin
Betsy Ruth
Josie	Pin
Kimberly
Leva	Pin

Semifinals
Lace
Sarona Snuka	Pin
Betsy Ruth
Kimberly	Pin

Final
Sarona Snuka
Betsy Ruth	Pin

== Championships ==
=== Active championships ===
Championship	Current champion(s)	Date won	Days held
WXW Heavyweight Championship	Chico Adams	December 21, 2019	2,448+
WXW Television Championship	Chico Adams	September 12, 2020	2,182+
WXW Cruiserweight Championship	Jorel Ganzy	October 26, 2019	2,504+
WXW Tag Team Championship	Controversial Inc. (Mr. C & Salazar)	September 12, 2020	2,182+
WXW Women's Championship	Marina Tucker	December 21, 2019	2,448+
WXW Women's Tag Team Championship	Go Hard Life Twins (Laur and Linda)	June 11, 2020	2,275+
WXW Ultimate Heavyweight Championship	BLK Jeez	November 2, 2019	2,497+
WXW Elite Tag Team Championship	South Philly's Finest (Jimmy Konway and Luca Brazzi)	November 2, 2019	2,497+
WXW Ultimate Hybrid Championship	Lance Anoa'i	June 5, 2021	1,916+
WXW Diamond Division Championship	Karissa Rivera	May 29, 2019	2,654+

=== Former championships ===
Championship	Last champion(s)	Date won
WXW Blast Television Championship	Bo Nekoda	May 30, 2014
WXW Campeon Internacionale Championship	Eddie Guapo	June 6, 2009
WXW Gulf Coast Tag Team Championship	Ron Fargo and Sinn	August 21, 2004
WXW Hardcore Championship	Jayson	July 11, 2003

== WXW Hall of Fame ==
There are currently 28 inductees in the hall of fame, from 2013 to 2016.

=== Inductees ===
Year	Ring name
2013	Dave Batista
2013	Doc Daniels
2013	Gene Snitsky
2013	Kamala
2013	Salvatore Bellomo
2013	Samu
2013	Sugaa
2013	Traci Brooks
2014	Gangrel
2014	Jimmy Snuka
2014	L.A. Smooth
2014	Mercedes Martinez
2014	The Perfect Creation (Richard J. Criado)
2014	Scott Matthews
2014	Tommy Suede
2015	Afa Anoaʻi Jr.
2015	Eddie Guapo
2015	Kattra
2015	Kris Krude
2015	Ricky Santana
2015	Rikishi
2016	Bill Apter
2016	The Bald Guy
2016	Homicide
2016	Jessica Dally
2016	Ken Patera
2016	Low Ki
2016	Reno Anoa'i

== See also ==
- List of independent wrestling promotions in the United States
- Gary Albright Memorial Show
- Yokozuna Memorial Show
