= Minneola, Florida =

- City
- City of Minneola
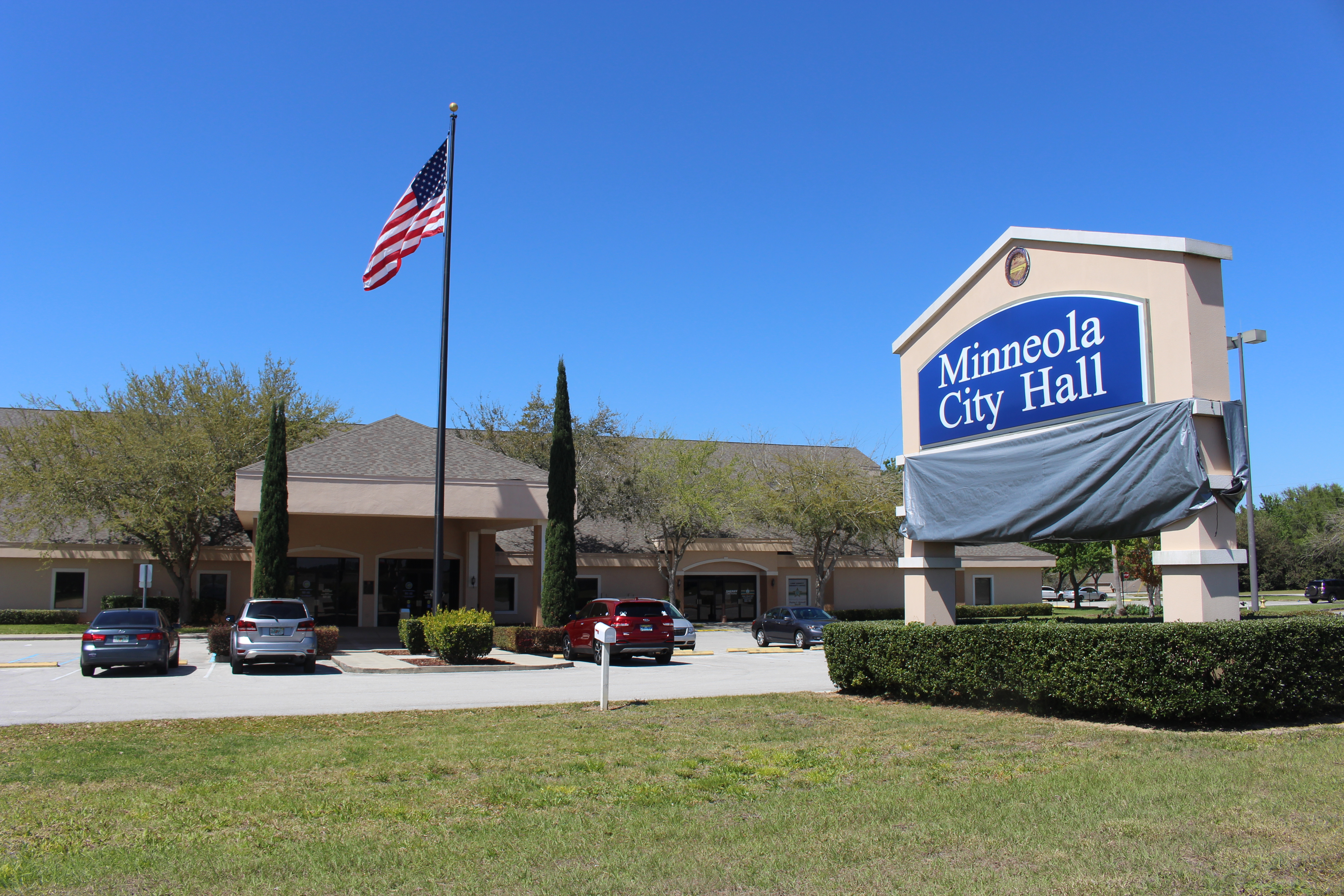
- City hall

- Seal

- Location in Lake County and the state of Florida
- Coordinates: 28°37′10″N 81°44′36″W
- Country: United States
- State: Florida
- County: Lake
- Founded: 1884
- Incorporated: 1925 or 1926

Government
  - Type: Council-Manager

Area
  - Total: 11.47 sq mi (29.70 km^{2})
  - Land: 11.13 sq mi (28.83 km^{2})
  - Water: 0.33 sq mi (0.86 km^{2})
- Elevation: 138 ft (42 m)

Population (2020)
  - Total: 13,843
  - Estimate (2025): 21,064
  - Density: 1,243.4/sq mi (480.09/km^{2})
- Time zone: UTC-5 (Eastern (EST))
  - Summer (DST): UTC-4 (EDT)
- ZIP code: 34715
- Area code: 352
- FIPS code: 12-45900
- GNIS feature ID: 2404273
- Website: www.minneola.us

Minneola is a city in Lake County, Florida, United States. It is part of the Orlando–Kissimmee–Sanford Metropolitan Statistical Area. The Minneola tangelo is named after the city. The population was 13,843 at the 2020 census.

== Etymology ==
The name Minneola is directly derived from the Dakota language. The city states the name means "much water." Specifically, the name is sourced from the words "mni" (water) and "ota" (much/many).

The name was chosen by the wife of George W. Hull, an early settler of the city.

== History ==
=== Indigenous habitation and colonization ===
Before European colonization and settlement, the area which is today Minneola was originally inhabited by the indigenous Timucua people. The population of the Timucua were whittled by epidemics of infectious diseases introduced by Europeans, then by attacks and slave raids largely conducted under Spanish colonial rule.

After the collapse of Timucua society, the indigenous Seminole people came to inhabit the region. In 1819, Florida was acquired by the United States from Spain with the Adams–Onís Treaty. Four years later, the area of modern-day Minneola became a part of an Indian reservation under the Treaty of Moultrie Creek. The Seminole were ultimately ethnically cleansed by federal troops in the Seminole Wars or driven out on the Trail of Tears. The region was geographically called the High Sand Hills by Americans, according to maps by Washington Hood.

=== Settlement and incorporation ===
The first white settler in what is today Minneola was Captain William A. Smith, originally from Georgia. The settlement was established shortly after the Civil War on the north shore of Plum Lake.

Other settlers began to move into the area around what was then called either Cow House Lake or Palatlakaha Lake in 1880. At this time, citrus groves began to be established in the area by the settler Henry Wilson. The settlement had a post office established three years later by George W. Hull, the city's first postmaster, based out of his home. The settlement was surveyed and mapped under direction by George W. Hull, and Cow House Lake was renamed to Lake Minneola; the namesake of the city.

Minneola was formally founded in 1884 as an unincorporated area, originally as a part of Sumter County. The town would become a part of Lake County when it was created in 1887.

The city would be formally incorporated in 1925 or 1926. Archibald A. Pitt served as the city's first mayor.

== Geography ==
According to the United States Census Bureau, the city has a total area of 11.47 square miles (29.70 km^{2}), of which 11.13 square miles (28.8 km^{2}) is land and 0.333 square miles (0.86 km^{2}) (5.26%) is water.

== Demographics ==
Historical population
Census	Pop.	Note	%±
1930	185		—
1940	269		45.4%
1950	399		48.3%
1960	684		71.4%
1970	878		28.4%
1980	851		−3.1%
1990	1,515		78.0%
2000	5,435		258.7%
2010	9,403		73.0%
2020	13,843		47.2%
2025 (est.)	21,064		52.2%
U.S. Decennial Census

=== Racial and ethnic composition ===
Minneola racial composition (Hispanics excluded from racial categories) (NH = Non-Hispanic)
Race	Pop 2010	Pop 2020	% 2010	% 2020
White (NH)	5,944	7,384	63.21%	53.34%
Black or African American (NH)	970	1,494	10.32%	10.79%
Native American or Alaska Native (NH)	32	32	0.34%	0.23%
Asian (NH)	228	576	2.42%	4.16%
Pacific Islander or Native Hawaiian (NH)	2	14	0.02%	0.10%
Some other race (NH)	89	153	0.95%	1.11%
Two or more races/Multiracial (NH)	230	679	2.45%	4.91%
Hispanic or Latino (any race)	1,908	3,511	20.29%	25.36%
Total	9,403	13,843	100.00%	100.00%

=== 2020 census ===
As of the 2020 census, Minneola had a population of 13,843. The median age was 36.4 years. 26.8% of residents were under the age of 18 and 11.3% of residents were 65 years of age or older. For every 100 females, there were 94.0 males, and for every 100 females age 18 and over, there were 91.1 males age 18 and over.

99.8% of residents lived in urban areas, while 0.2% lived in rural areas.

There were 4,516 households in Minneola, of which 46.5% had children under the age of 18 living in them. Of all households, 60.8% were married-couple households, 11.5% were households with a male householder and no spouse or partner present, and 20.1% were households with a female householder and no spouse or partner present. About 12.3% of all households were made up of individuals and 4.6% had someone living alone who was 65 years of age or older.

There were 4,740 housing units, of which 4.7% were vacant. The homeowner vacancy rate was 1.4% and the rental vacancy rate was 5.6%.

=== 2020 ACS estimates ===
According to 2020 ACS 5-year estimates, there were 2,959 families residing in the city.

=== 2010 census ===
As of the 2010 United States census, there were 9,403 people, 3,107 households, and 2,399 families residing in the city.

=== 2000 census ===
As of the census of 2000, there are 5,435 people, 1,929 households, and 1,516 families residing in the city. The population density is 685.8/km^{2} (1,776/mi^{2}). There are 2,032 housing units at an average density of 256.4/km^{2} (664/mi^{2}). The racial makeup of the city is 88.70% White, 5.06% African American, 0.28% Native American, 1.32% Asian, 0.04% Pacific Islander, 2.94% from other races, and 1.66% from two or more races. 10.93% of the population are Hispanic or Latino of any race.

As of 2000, there were 1,929 households, out of which 42.4% had children under the age of 18 living with them, 65.7% were married couples living together, 8.5% had a female householder with no husband present, and 21.4% were non-families. 16.6% of all households were made up of individuals, and 4.6% had someone living alone who was 65 years of age or older. The average household size was 2.81 and the average family size was 3.14.

In 2000, in the city, the population was spread out, with 29.7% under the age of 18, 5.9% from 18 to 24, 37.2% from 25 to 44, 18.5% from 45 to 64, and 8.7% who were 65 years of age or older. The median age was 33 years. For every 100 females, there were 96.5 males. For every 100 females age 18 and over, there were 95.7 males.

In 2000, the median income for a household in the city was $46,250, and the median income for a family was $52,645. Males had a median income of $36,231 versus $23,569 for females. The per capita income for the city was $20,721. About 3.7% of families and 6.1% of the population were below the poverty line, including 9.1% of those under age 18 and 7.5% of those age 65 or over.

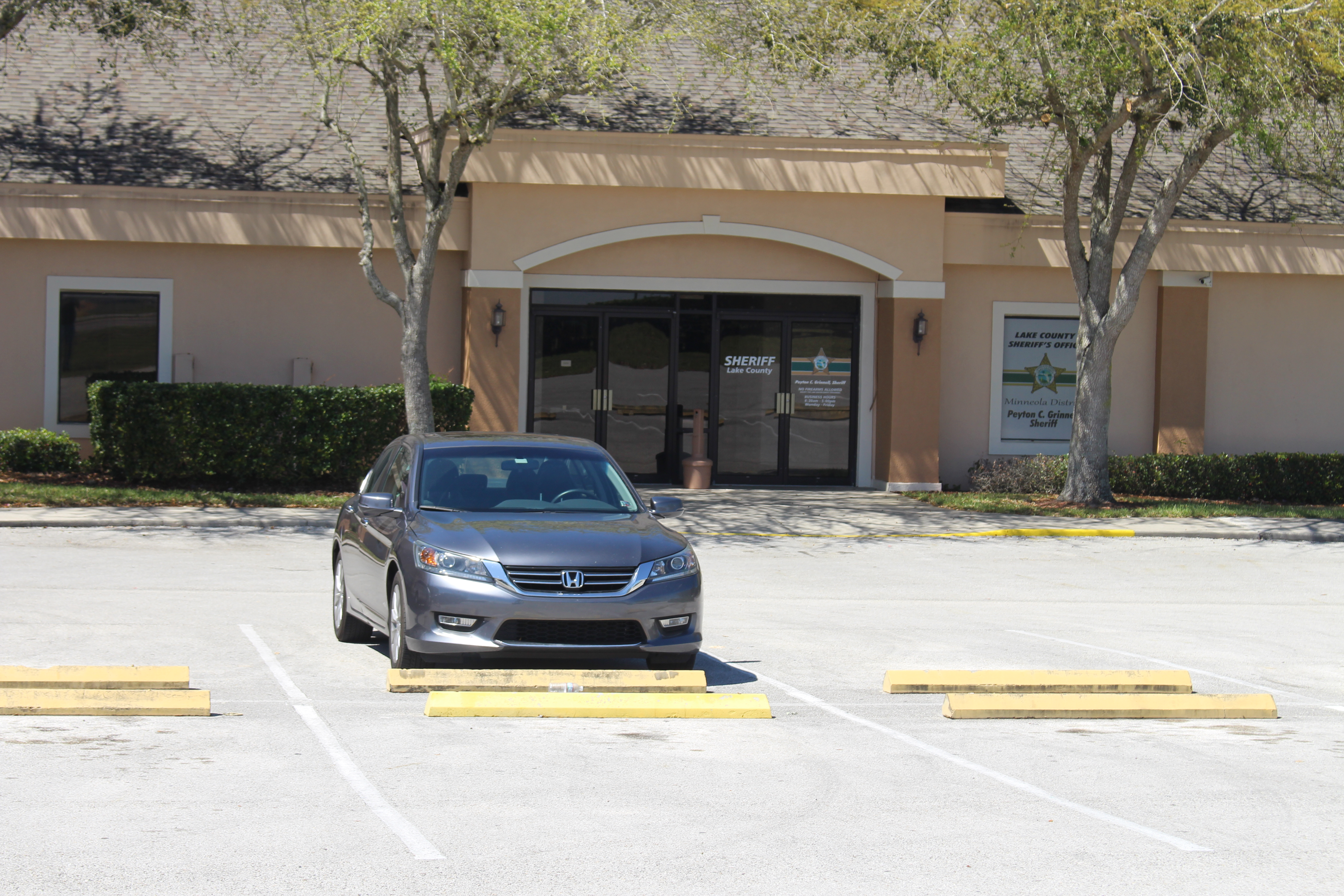
Lake County Sheriff's Office Minneola District

== Notable people ==
- Ryan Villopoto, four-time supercross and five-time motocross champion

== Government and infrastructure ==
Lake County Sheriff's Office has the Minneola District offices in Minneola.

== Education ==
A ribbon-cutting ceremony on July 16, 2025, officially opened the new Minneola Horizon Academy (K–8), with a focus on aviation, aerospace, and STEAM education.

Lake County Schools operates area public schools.

== Healthcare ==
AdventHealth Minneola is the only hospital.
