= Lloyd Anoaʻi =

American professional wrestler (born 1970)

Personal information
- Born: May 7, 1970 (age 56) Allentown, Pennsylvania, U.S.
- Family: Anoaʻi

Professional wrestling career
- Ring name(s): Alofa; Headshrinker Alofa; Headshrinker Ruopa; L.A. Smooth; Lloyd Lanui; Ruopa; Tahiti; Tahitian Savage; Tahitian Warrior
- Billed height: 6 ft 2 in (188 cm)
- Billed weight: 363 lb (165 kg)
- Billed from: Samoa; Tahiti
- Trained by: Afa Anoaʻi; Sika Anoaʻi
- Debut: 1987

Lloyd Anoaʻi (born May 7, 1970) is an American professional wrestler and professional wrestling manager and producer for Qatar Pro Wrestling, and World of War Wrestling in South Africa. He is best known for his appearances with the World Wrestling Federation (WWF) under the ring names Tahitian Savage, Fred Williams, and Lloyd Lanui and for his appearances with Extreme Championship Wrestling (ECW) under the ring name L.A. Smooth. He is one of the three sons of professional wrestling patriarch Afa Anoaʻi and a member of the Anoaʻi family.

== Professional wrestling career ==
Anoaʻi trained under his father Afa and his uncle Sika, making his wrestling debut in 1987.

Anoaʻi appeared with the World Wrestling Federation (WWF) under the ring names "Tahitian Savage", "Fred Williams", and "Lloyd Lanui" from 1993 and 1995 to 1996. In 1993 Anoaʻi began wrestling for the Puerto Rican World Wrestling Council as "Tahitian Warrior". He formed a tag team with Mohammed Hussein, winning the WWC Tag Team Championship three times in 1994. He held the Championship on a fourth occasion in 2002, teaming with Tahitian Prince as "The Tahitians".

In 1996 and 1997 Anoaʻi appeared with Extreme Championship Wrestling (ECW) as "L.A. Smooth", one-half of The Samoan Gangster Party. After he went on to sign with the World Wrestling Federation in 1998. He then went on to wrestle on the American independent circuit, appearing with promotions such as World Xtreme Wrestling.

While Rikishi stayed with the WWF in the early 2000s, Anoaʻi teamed up with Samu on the independent circuit as The Headshrinkers. During this time, Anoaʻi used the ring names "Headshrinker Alofa" and "Headshrinker Ruopa."

In addition to wrestling, Anoaʻi acts as a trainer at his father's "Wild Samoan Training Center".

== Championships and accomplishments ==
- European Wrestling Association
  - EWA Intercontinental Championship (1 time)
- Eastern Wrestling Federation/Hardaway Wrestling
  - EWF/HW Tag Team Championship (1 time) – with Headshrinker Samu
- Independent Superstars of Pro Wrestling
  - ISPW Tag Team Championship (1 time) – with Headshrinker Samu
- New Horizon Pro Wrestling
  - NHPW Hybrid Championship (1 time)
- Qatar Pro Wrestling
  - QPW Souq Waqif Championship (1 time)
- World Wrestling Council
  - WWC World Tag Team Championship (9 times) – with Mohammed Hussein (3), Islander Kuhio (1), Tahitian Prince (1), Viper (1) and Afa Jr. (3)
- World Wrestling Professionals
  - WWP World Tag Team Championship (1 time) – with Afa Jr.
- World Xtreme Wrestling
  - WXW Tag Team Championship (4 times) – with Matt E. Smalls (3) and Afa Jr. (1)
