= Lollipop (wrestler) =

American professional wrestler

Personal information
- Born: Jaime Lynne; March 17, 1979 (age 47) Nashville, Tennessee, U.S.

Professional wrestling career
- Ring name(s): Jamie; Lollipop
- Billed height: 5 ft 7 in (1.70 m)
- Billed weight: 118 lb (54 kg)
- Trained by: Big Bully Douglas; Ron Harris; Leilani Kai; Jerry Lynn; Chase Stevens
- Debut: 2002
- Retired: 2006

Jaime Lynne (born March 17, 1979) is an American retired professional wrestler and valet, better known by her ring name, Lollipop. She is best known for her appearances with National Wrestling Alliance: Total Nonstop Action from 2002 to 2004.

== Professional wrestling career ==
=== Early career (2002) ===
Lynne made her wrestling debut in early 2002, acting as a valet in the Columbia, Tennessee-based National Wrestling Alliance (NWA) Main Event promotion.

=== NWA: Total Nonstop Action (2002–2004) ===
She went on to appear with NWA: Total Nonstop Action (TNA) as "Lollipop", a dancer who took her name from her omnipresent lollipop. She first appeared in the August 21, 2002, weekly PPV. In September 2002, Lynne decided to train as a wrestler, and began taking lessons from Leilani Kai. In a controversial angle, Lynne appeared topless on the March 12, 2003, TNA pay-per-view while brawling with Holly Wood of Sports Entertainment Xtreme. Lynne was then involved in a feud with the all-female stable known as Bitchslap, which consisted of Traci Brooks and Nurse Veronica. During an in-ring segment, Bitchslap issued an open challenge to any women in attendance. Lynne (who was attacked by Brooks several weeks earlier) and fellow TNA cage dancer April Pennington accepted the challenge. They tried attacking Brooks and Veronica but were stopped by TNA security guards. The following week, Lynne challenged Bitchslap to a match. Veronica (without Brooks present) accepted, but was attacked by both Lynne and Pennington until TNA security again stopped the catfight.

Veronica then replaced Brooks with a new partner, Cheerleader Valentina (who had earlier competed as JV Love on TNA Xplosion in a match against Brooks). Veronica and Valentina attacked the TNA cage dancers during a dance routine, but were separated by TNA security. A match was finally scheduled between Bitchslap (Veronica and Valentina) and the TNA cage dancers (Pennington and Lynne). However, before the match could fully start it was interrupted by Trinity, who revealed herself as the newest member of Bitchslap and attacked Pennington and Lynne. The TNA cage dancers retaliated against Bitchslap the following week. They summoned Bitchslap to the ring; however, Trinity forced Veronica and Valentina into the ring to fight the cage dancers. Pennington and Lynne attacked Veronica and Valentina with leather straps until they fled up the entrance ramp to rejoin Trinity.

The storyline with Bitchslap was then dropped because TNA didn't have enough female wrestlers to compete against the group, and Veronica turned down a two-year contract with TNA, instead attempting to sign with either WWE or a company in Japan. Lynne and Pennington returned to their roles as cage dancers, Brooks and Trinity were then placed into other storylines, and TNA stopped booking Valentina.

Lynne would begin appearing as an assistant for Jonny Fairplay on various occasions and continued to perform as a TNA cage dancer until February 2004.

=== Independent circuit (2003–2006) ===
After leaving TNA, Lynne worked on the independent circuit as a wrestler and valet, appearing with promotions such as Ring of Honor. On January 8, 2005, Lollipop wrestled in South Korea with the Mid-Atlantic Championship Wrestling promotion, teaming with Gail Kim to defeat Malia Hosaka and Nidia.

In January 2006, Lynne began teaming with Amber O'Neal as "Team Blondage", replacing O'Neal's original partner, Krissy Vaine. In the process, Lynne replaced Vaine as one half of the Women's Extreme Wrestling Tag Team Champions. The duo held the titles until the April 6, 2006 WEW pay-per-view, when Lynne and O'Neal lost to the tag team of April Hunter and Talia Madison after defeating them in singles bouts earlier in the evening.

In September 2006, she decided to leave the wrestling business. She returned for a one-time appearance in November 2007 and wrestled Christie Ricci.

== Championships and accomplishments ==
- Women's Extreme Wrestling
  - WEW Tag Team Championship (1 time) – with Amber O'Neal
