= Bitch Slap (disambiguation) =

Bitch Slap is a 2009 American film directed by Rick Jacobson.

Bitch Slap may also refer to:

- Bitch slap, a slang term for a type of physical abuse
- "Bitch Slap", a song by Reks from the album The Greatest X
- Bitchslap (professional wrestling), a female wrestling team
