= Jennifer Thomas (wrestler) =

American fitness model, session wrestler, professional wrestler and bodybuilder

Personal information
- Born: Jennifer Rachelle Thomas; October 15, 1973 (age 52) Dallas, Texas

Professional wrestling career
- Ring name(s): Karma; Kharma; Daisy Mae; Jennifer Mae; Jenny Mae; Jennifer Fit; Jennifer; SnowCal Chloe; Chloe
- Billed height: 5 ft 1 in (1.55 m)
- Billed weight: 135 lb (61 kg)
- Billed from: Loomis, California; Venice, California
- Trained by: Navajo Warrior; Ultimate Pro Wrestling; Ohio Valley Wrestling
- Debut: 2003

Jennifer Rachelle Thomas (born October 15, 1973) is an American fitness model, session wrestler, professional wrestler and former bodybuilder. She is perhaps best known for her tenures in Ohio Valley Wrestling while under a developmental contract with World Wrestling Entertainment and in the World Independent Ladies' Division, where she was the latter promotion's inaugural World Champion.

== Early life and career ==
In high school, Thomas participated in track and field, where she performed both sprinting and the triple jump. Upon graduating, she began weightlifting in 1998 due to becoming overweight, and managed to become Washington's finalist in the Miss Hawaiian Tropic USA competition in 2000. Thomas then began competing in bodybuilding competitions in 2001, winning first and overall in the lightweight division of that year's Vancouver Classic. She would also compete in that year's MuscleMania SuperBody World Championships, where she finished in the top ten. In 2002, Thomas soon moved into fitness and figure competitions and placed third in her first contest, the Greeley, Colorado Aloha Classic. She then placed first in her second competition in the Capital City, Florida Championships and continued to find success in other contests throughout the year. Thomas also began appearing in magazines that same year, including the May issue of Southern Muscle Fitness, the June issue of Oxygen, the August issue of Women's Physique World and the September issue of Flex.

In 2003, she competed in her final bodybuilding competition, and finished in sixth place in the heavyweight division of the California Championships while finishing fourth in the Championships' fitness division. While training in the original Gold's Gym in Venice Beach that same year, Thomas was approached by numerous professional wrestlers who also trained there, including Mark Henry, The Rock, Stone Cold Steve Austin, Luther Reigns, Chris Masters and The Miz, who recommended her to try out for professional wrestling. Although initially declining, Thomas decided to begin training for wrestling after persistent recommendations.

Jennifer Thomas
- Professional bodybuilder

Personal info
- Born: October 15, 1973 (age 52); Dallas, Texas

Best statistics

Professional (Pro) career
- Pro-debut: 2001 Emerald Cup; 2001
- Best win: 2001 Vancouver Classic LW and Overall Champion; 2001
- Active: 2003

== Professional wrestling career ==
=== Impact Zone Wrestling (2003–2005, 2007) ===
After training under both Navajo Warrior and the California-based Ultimate Pro Wrestling in 2003, Thomas made her professional debut that same year under the ring name Karma. Beginning in 2004, Thomas tweaked her ring name to Kharma and debuted in Impact Zone Wrestling, where she soon began feuding with fellow female wrestler Adrenelyn, whom she lost to on March 2. Eighteen days later, Kharma lost a tag team match to Adrenelyn. On April 1, Kharma finally defeated Adrenelyn and would go on to defeat her in subsequent rematches throughout April before defeating her for the final time on June 8 to end their feud.

Kharma would also wrestle against male competitors twice while in IZW, first losing to Jack Bull on October 12 before defeating Sheik Hussein on October 26. After placing tenth in the Sacramento Championships' fitness division in late 2004, Thomas wrestled her final match in IZW on April 12, 2005, as she defeated Luscious and former rival Adrenelyn in a triple threat match. On May 4, 2007, Thomas made a one-time return to IZW in a match for the Tag Team Championship, which she and Destiny lost to the defending champions Bump-N-Grind (Morgan and Erica D'Erico).

=== World Wrestling Entertainment (2005–2007) ===
After a brief stay in Deep South Wrestling, one of World Wrestling Entertainment's two developmental territories, in late 2005 under the ring name Daisy Mae, Thomas was eventually signed to a developmental contract by WWE in December. After receiving her contract, Thomas reverted to her Kharma ring name and, beginning in April 2006, would go on tour throughout South Korea, Japan, Guam and Hawaii.

==== Ohio Valley Wrestling ====
After her tour, Thomas returned to America and debuted in WWE's main developmental territory, Ohio Valley Wrestling, on June 5, 2006 under her Daisy Mae ring name, where she defeated ODB with Shelly Martinez as the special guest referee. Three days later, Mae defeated ODB in a rematch, igniting a feud between the two. On June 16, Thomas' ring name was changed to simply Jennifer, and both she and Serena lost a tag team match to ODB and Venus. On July 5, her ring name was again tweaked, this time to Jennifer Mae, as she lost to Martinez. Mae would wrestle her first match for the Women's Championship on August 9, but was unable to defeat ODB for the title. September 10, Mae became a heel as she and Cherry lost a tag team match to Serena and Victoria Crawford.

After a brief feud with Crawford, Mae took part in a gauntlet match against then-Women's Champion Beth Phoenix for Phoenix's title on November 1, but was unable to win the match as Katie Lea eliminated Serena last to win the title. On December 6, Mae challenged Katie Lea for her newly won Women's Title, but was unable to win the title. Mae would then compete in several 8-Diva tag team matches throughout 2007 before wrestling her final match in OVW on August 22, where she and Katie Lea won a tag team match against ODB and Nattie Neidhart. Thomas was released from her contract soon afterwards.

=== Hiatus and return (2008–2010) ===
After being released from her developmental contract with WWE, Thomas, under her Kharma ring name, debuted in Extreme Canadian Championship Wrestling on December 12, where she and Nikki Matthews lost a triple threat match to Penni Lane to determine the number one contender for the SuperGirls Championship. After the match, Thomas took a year-long hiatus from wrestling. While on hiatus, she competed in her final fitness and figure competition, placing eleventh in the 2008 Emerald Cup.

On December 19, 2008, Thomas, now using the ring name SnowCal Chloe and sporting both new attire and a new "snowy Playmate-esque" gimmick, returned to wrestling and defeated Aiden Riley at the Empire Wrestling Federation's event The Fight Before Christmas. On February 15, Riley defeated Chloe in a rematch at Damage Control. On April 17 at the Fallout event, Chloe faced Riley in a rematch, this time in a tag team match, but was unable to defeat Riley. On May 15 at the 13th Anniversary Extravaganza, Chloe defeated male wrestler Mondo Vega. Two days later, Chloe took part in the Alternative Wrestling Show's tournament to determine who would win the vacant Women's Championship, but lost in the first round to Erica D'Erico.

Chloe returned to the EWF on June 12 at The Covina Classic event, where she lost a triple threat match to Harley Wonderland that also involved Yyan Nakano. Thirteen days later, Chloe defeated Harley in a singles match. On July 31 at Rock Slam, Nakano finally defeated Chloe in a singles match. Four months later, Chloe returned to the Alternative Wrestling Show for their Students and Pros event, where she and her team lost in a 10-person intergender tag team match.

On May 22, 2010, Thomas, now shortening her ring name to Chloe and dropping the Playmate gimmick, competed in the debut match of the World Independent Ladies' Division promotion, where she defeated Kiara Dillon to become the promotion's inaugural World Champion and also win the first championship of her professional wrestling career. After a successful title defense against Nikki the New York Knockout on June 6, Chloe lost the title to Thunderkitty on August 29.

== Post-wrestling and return ==
Soon after losing the WILD World Championship, Thomas took a hiatus from professional wrestling and began working as a session wrestler near the end of 2010. In early 2014, Thomas also began training to become a catch wrestler. She made her return to professional wrestling in 2015, facing off against the likes of Kiara Dillon and Katarina Leigh.

On June 15, 2019 she defeated Allie Parker to win the Professional Girl Wrestling Association Championship in Los Angeles.

== Championships and accomplishments ==
=== Bodybuilding ===
- 2001 Emerald Cup – 5th (MW)
- 2001 Vancouver Classic – 1st (LW and overall)
- 2001 MuscleMania SuperBody World Championships – 10th
- 2003 California Championships – 6th (HW)

=== Fitness and figure competition ===
- 2002 Greeley, Colorado Aloha Classic – 3rd
- 2002 Capital City, Florida Championships – 1st
- 2002 Boulder, Colorado Championships – 2nd
- 2002 Emerald Cup – 3rd
- 2002 Los Angeles Championships – 4th
- 2003 California Championships – 4th
- 2004 Sacramento Championships – 10th
- 2008 Emerald Cup – 11th

=== Professional wrestling ===
- Professional Girl Wrestling Association
  - PGWA Championship (1 time, current)
- World Independent Ladies Division Wrestling
  - WILD World Championship (1 time)
