= Blondage =

Blondage may refer to:

- Blondage, a collection of haircare products from Redken
- Blondage, an artist signed to the Tambourhinoceros music label
- Blondage, an adult video which won an award at the 12th AVN Awards
- Blondage, a member of 2017-2018 Team Australia in women's international roller derby
- Blondage, a traveling exotic dancing duo consisting of Janine Lindemulder and Julia Ann

== See also ==
- Team Blondage, a professional wrestling tag team
- "Of Human Blondage", an episode in the second season of The Hogan Family
