= Team Blondage =

Professional wrestling tag team

Tag team
- Name(s): Team Blondage; Team Blondage 2.0
- Hometown: North Carolina
- Former member(s): Kristin Astara / Krissy Vaine; Amber O'Neal; Lollipop
- Debut: 2004
- Disbanded: 2010

Team Blondage was a professional wrestling tag team that consisted of real life friends Amber O'Neal and Krissy Vaine. They are mostly known for their work in Shimmer Women Athletes, where they were the first tag team ever formed in the promotion's history.

== Career ==
=== Team Blondage ===
After an injury Amber Holly returned to the ring on May 16, 2004, adopting the ring name Amber O'Neal and the gimmick of a motocross racer. She changed her name because of her respect for Nora Greenwald, who used the ringname Molly Holly. Greenwald helped O'Neal in her tryout matches with World Wrestling Entertainment.

In late 2004, O'Neal formed a tag team with Krissy Vaine known as Team Blondage. The team wrestled primarily on the North Carolina independent circuit, appearing with promotions such as Shimmer Women Athletes and Women's Extreme Wrestling. Team Blondage defeated Cle-ho-patra and Navaho to win the vacant WEW Tag Team Championship on May 8, 2005 at the WEW pay-per-view "No Ho's Barred". In the course of their reign, Vaine signed a contract with WWE. Vaine was subsequently replaced within Team Blondage by Total Nonstop Action Wrestling alumna Lollipop. On the April 6, 2006 WEW pay-per-view, O'Neal and Lollipop lost the WEW Women's Tag Team Championship to T and A (Talia and April Hunter).

=== Team Blondage 2.0 ===
After a long term hiatus prior leaving WWE and the wrestling business for over a year, it was announced that Krissy Vaine decided to return to the wrestling industry and reunite with her Team Blondage partner, Amber O'Neal. They have now announced themselves to be dubbed, Team Blondage 2.0. They would go on to win their return match they have won against the Scream Queens (Daffney and MsChif).

== Championships and accomplishments ==
- Women's Extreme Wrestling
  - WEW Tag Team Championship (2 times) - O'Neal and Vaine (1) and O'Neal and Lollipop (1)
