= Krissy Vaine =

American professional wrestler (born 1981)

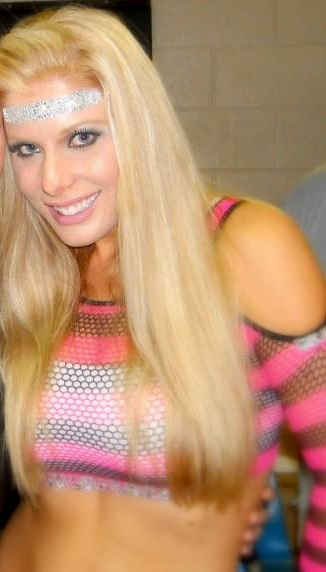
- Eubanks in 2009

Personal information
- Born: Kristin Eubanks; January 12, 1981 (age 45) Greensboro, North Carolina, U.S.
- Children: 1

Professional wrestling career
- Ring name(s): Nurse Krissy Sealice; Krissy Vaine; Kristin Astara; Ladie Vaine; Special K
- Billed height: 5 ft 8 in (1.73 m)
- Billed weight: 130 lb (59 kg)
- Billed from: Greensboro, North Carolina; San Diego, California; Malibu, California
- Trained by: Jeff Rudd; Deep South Wrestling; Florida Championship Wrestling
- Debut: September 2000

Kristin Eubanks (born January 12, 1981) is an American model, professional wrestler and valet. She is better known by her ring name Krissy Vaine and also for her time in World Wrestling Entertainment. She also trained at WWE's developmental territories Deep South Wrestling and Florida Championship Wrestling before leaving the company on October 10, 2007, due to family issues. She currently wrestles for ALW (Atomic Legacy Wrestling).

== Professional wrestling career ==
=== Early career (2000–2006) ===
Eubanks made her wrestling debut in September 2000 as Special K, where she acted as a manager for wrestlers. By mid-2003, she transitioned from a managerial role to an in-ring competitor and subsequently adopted the ring name Krissy Vaine. In 2004, Vaine began teaming with Amber O'Neal and the pair were soon named Team Blondage. After a few tryouts with World Wrestling Entertainment on both SmackDown! and Raw, Eubanks began working for several independent promotions, including the Professional Girl Wrestling Association, Women's Extreme Wrestling, Memphis Wrestling, the National Wrestling Alliance and Shimmer Women Athletes.

=== World Wrestling Entertainment ===
==== Deep South Wrestling (2006–2007) ====
On January 22, 2006, Eubanks signed a developmental contract with WWE and was assigned to Deep South Wrestling. Eubanks, under her Krissy Vaine name, made her first DSW appearance at the March 9, 2006 tapings where she and Kristal Marshall threw T-shirts into the crowd during intermission. Her official debut occurred at the March 16 tapings, where she appeared as a referee. In addition to refereeing, she also managed Kevin Matthews during his matches.

Vaine made her DSW in-ring debut on the June 22 tapings, where she defeated Tracy Taylor. On the June 22, 2006 edition of DSW TV, Krissy Vaine defeated Tracey Taylor with help from Special Guest Referee Matt Striker On the June 29 edition of DSW TV, Vaine and Striker were defeated by Tracey Taylor and Mike Taylor.

At the October 12 tapings, Vaine became the General Manager for DSW. In late 2006 and early 2007, she began a feud with Angel Williams, with Williams claiming that Vaine did something immoral to be appointed General Manager. In response, Vaine began to cost Williams matches with distractions from other Divas. She then tried to order around the other Divas, such as Nattie Neidhart, Brooke Adams and Shantelle Taylor to take care of Williams for her, though to no avail. Instead, Vaine decided to try to make up with Williams, with the latter accepting the apology and resulting in them both becoming the co-General Managers of DSW.

On the June 27, 2006 edition of DSW TV, Vaine defeated Shantelle Taylor when Vaine grabbed her tights. On the September 9, 2006 edition of DSW TV, she lost against Shantelle at Deep South Wrestling Grand Park Slam event in Six Flags Over Georgia. On the March 8, 2007 edition of DSW TV, Vaine defeated Nattie Neidhart. On the March 15, 2007 edition of DSW TV, Vaine teamed with Angel Williams in a losing effort to Nattie Neidhart and Shantelle. On March 16 edition of DSW Vaine and Williams defeated Nattie Neidhart and Shantelle in a rematch. On the March 17 edition of DSW TV, Vaine and Williams was defeated in another rematch by Nattie Neidhart and Shantelle. On the April 5 edition of DSW TV, Vaine competed against Nattie Neidhart in a winning effort. Vaine and Williams was once again defeated by Nattie Neidhart and Shantelle.

==== Florida Championship Wrestling and departure (2007) ====
After DSW was shut down, Vaine was moved to Florida Championship Wrestling, WWE's newest developmental territory. Vaine made her FCW debut on June 26, 2007, where she lost to Nattie Neidhart in a three-way match also involving Shantelle Taylor. On September 15 edition of FCW, Vaine teamed with Nattie Neidhart in a losing effort to The Bella Twins with Victoria Crawford as special referee. On the September 28, 2007 episode of SmackDown!, Eubanks made her WWE debut as a villainess by attacking Torrie Wilson after Wilson lost a match to Victoria. On the October 5 episode of SmackDown!, Vaine was seen backstage negotiating her first match with SmackDown! General Manager Vickie Guerrero. However, both Eubanks and her boyfriend at the time Ryan O'Reilly left WWE on October 10 due to health issues with both of their families.

=== Return to the independent circuit (2009–2011) ===
After a nearly two-year-long hiatus from professional wrestling following her WWE departure, Eubanks made her return to the wrestling industry on February 2, 2009, where she reunited with Amber O'Neal to reform Team Blondage and defeat Daffney and MsChif in a tag team match. On September 12, 2009, Vaine won her first singles championship by defeating Jayme Jameson to win the NWA Mid-Atlantic Women's Championship. The win made Vaine the first champion in nearly nine years due to the title being vacated and subsequently abandoned on December 2, 2000 by the last champion Leilani Kai. Soon after winning the title, Vaine renamed herself Kristin Astara before losing the title to Jameson on April 10, 2010. She later faced Jameson for the title in three subsequent rematches on May 1, October 30, and November 6, but was defeated each time.

=== Lucha Libre USA (2011) ===
In early 2011, Eubanks was signed to perform for MTV2's Lucha Libre USA. She made her debut for the promotion on the March 19 tapings under the ring name Nurse Krissy Sealice in an intergender match, where she and Vladamiro defeated Mini Park and ODB. On May 28, Sealice lost in her singles debut to Nikki Corleone. Sealice wrestled her final match for the promotion on August 27, where she and Vladimiro defeated Octagoncito and Pequeno Halloween in a mixed tag team match.

=== Second return to the independent circuit (2019–present) ===
On September 14, 2019, Vaine made her return to professional wrestling at WrestlePro where she defeated Kris Statlander.

== Modeling career ==
In addition to wrestling, Eubanks also began working for the Home Shopping Network in 2011 as a model for beauty products and clothing.

== Personal life ==
Eubanks played softball in her youth and was also a cheerleader in high school. She has also been a model for Wrangler.

Eubanks was married to wrestler Ryan Parmeter until 2024.

In August 2009, Eubanks became a blogger for women's wrestling website Diva Dirt. In January 2010, Eubanks launched her own podcast, The Krissy Vaine Project, at Diva Dirt. In March 2010, Eubanks announced that she was no longer using her long-time ring name Krissy Vaine. She then revealed her new ring name to be Kristin Astara. Following her name change, she also renamed her podcast to Kristin & Friends, with the first episode airing on March 27, 2010.

Eubanks announced on her Instagram page that she is pregnant with her first child. She gave birth to a boy named Elijah in 2018.

Eubanks announced on her Instagram page that she would make her first joint appearance with her current boyfriend, former WCW and WWE superstar Jimmy Wang Yang, at GrappleCon 4 in Tampa, Florida on April 11, 2026.

== Championships and accomplishments ==
- Atomic Revolutionary Wrestling
  - ARW Bombshells Championship (1 time)
- Mid-Atlantic Championship Wrestling^{1}
  - NWA Mid-Atlantic Women's Championship (1 time)
- Women's Extreme Wrestling
  - WEW Tag Team Championship (1 time) – with Amber O'Neal

^{1}This Mid-Atlantic promotion, while currently operating in the same region of the United States and having revised some of the championships used by the original Mid-Atlantic promotion, is not the same promotion that was once owned by Jim Crockett, Jr. and was sold to Ted Turner in 1988. It is just another NWA affiliated promotion.

=== Luchas de Apuestas ===
Winner (wager)	Loser (wager)	Location	Event	Date	Notes
Krissy Vaine (hair)	Jenny Taylor (hair)	Philadelphia, Pennsylvania	WEW Live event	January 2, 2008	
