= Simply Luscious =

American professional wrestler (born 1973)

Personal information
- Born: Veronica Carrejo; July 19, 1973 (age 53) San Antonio, Texas, US

Professional wrestling career
- Ring name(s): Nurse Veronica; Ronnie Stevens; Scrumptious; Simply Luscious
- Billed height: 5 ft 6 in (1.68 m)
- Billed weight: 130 lb (59 kg)
- Billed from: San Antonio, Texas
- Trained by: Shawn Michaels; Dory Funk Jr.
- Debut: 2000

Veronica "Ronnie" Carrejo-Brazier (born July 19, 1973), also known by her ring name Simply Luscious, is an American professional wrestler best known for her stint in Total Nonstop Action Wrestling. Since 2004, she has been performing on the independent circuit.

== Professional Wrestling Career ==
=== Early career ===
Stevens studied karate and ballet before getting into wrestling. She became the only female graduate of the Shawn Michaels' Texas Wrestling Academy, where she trained along with Paul London, Brian Kendrick, Matt Bentley, and Bryan Danielson. She made her in-ring debut against Chris Marval in San Antonio, Texas, under the name "Simply Luscious", a moniker she got from her ex-husband, hockey player Ryan Pisiak.

Soon after debuting, Stevens appeared briefly in World Championship Wrestling in a spot with Tank Abbott, where she received a concussion from Abbot.

=== Independent circuit ===
Throughout 2002, Stevens, under her Simply Luscious ring name, worked for Jersey All Pro Wrestling and prominently for Ring of Honor. On June 22, Simply Luscious joined ROH's group The Prophecy, led by Christopher Daniels. On December 28, at the event Final Battle, Luscious defeated Alexis Laree. Later that night, she left the Prophecy to join Steve Corino's new group and thus began feuding with the Prophecy.

=== Total Nonstop Action Wrestling ===
In 2003, Stevens began working for the Total Nonstop Action Wrestling promotion as a Knockout and became the leader of the all-female team Bitchslap. The foundation for the team was formed during the May 28, 2003 Total Nonstop Action Wrestling weekly pay-per-view. At the time, Traci Brooks was involved in a storyline demanding equal rights as a female wrestler and competing in matches against male wrestlers. As part of the storyline, she was forced to team with David Young in an Asylum Alliance tag team tournament. Stevens (who had earlier competed as Simply Luscious on TNA Xplosion in a match against Lucy) debuted in a new on-air role as TNA's backstage clinician named Nurse Veronica. The following week during an intergender match pitting Brooks and Young against Ron Killings, Brooks was injured by Killings. Stevens rushed to the ring to aid Brooks. During this time, Brooks was also involved in catfights with Young's valet, Desire. Brooks and Young then faced America's Most Wanted in the tournament final, but lost. After the match, Young threatened Brooks, but she was again saved by Stevens.

During an interview with Goldy Locks, Brooks and Stevens announced that TNA officials would no longer allow women to compete against men; however, they would continue to work together as a stable named Bitchslap. The duo then issued an open challenge to any women in attendance. TNA cage dancers April Pennington and Lollipop (who was attacked by Brooks several weeks earlier) accepted the challenge. They tried attacking Brooks and Stevens but were stopped by TNA security guards. The following week, Lollipop challenged Bitchslap to a match. Stevens (without Brooks present) accepted, but was attacked by both Lollipop and Pennington until TNA security again stopped the catfight.

Stevens then replaced Brooks with a new partner, Cheerleader Valentina (who had earlier competed as JV Love on TNA Xplosion in a match against Brooks). Stevens and Valentina attacked the TNA cage dancers during a dance routine, but were separated by TNA security. A match was finally scheduled between Bitchslap (Stevens and Valentina) and the TNA cage dancers (Pennington and Lollipop). However, before the match could fully start it was interrupted by Trinity, who revealed herself as the newest member of Bitchslap and attacked Pennington and Lollipop. The TNA cage dancers retaliated against Bitchslap the following week. They summoned Bitchslap to the ring; however, Trinity forced Stevens and Valentina into the ring to fight the cage dancers. Pennington and Lollipop attacked Stevens and Valentina with leather straps until they fled up the entrance ramp to rejoin Trinity. During this time, Stevens also received a brief push as the group's leader and was victorious in a singles match on TNA Xplosion against Daizee Haze (in a match where the loser was forced to wear a diaper).

The storyline with Bitchslap was then dropped because TNA didn't have enough female wrestlers to compete against the group, and Stevens turned down a two-year contract with TNA, instead attempting to sign with either WWE or a company in Japan. Brooks and Trinity were then placed into other storylines and TNA stopped booking Valentina.

=== Return to the independent circuit ===
Throughout 2004 and 2005, Luscious began to work for independent promotions all across the world. On February 14, 2004, Simply Luscious beat Sumie Sakai to become the USA Pro Women's champion. During the summer of 2004, she spent time in Mexico working for Consejo Mundial de Lucha Libre. She also occasionally worked for Zero-One Japan with a villainous referee gimmick.

Stevens returned to the Texas Wrestling Academy in 2006 and spent May through July training in preparation for a World Wrestling Entertainment try-out in mid July, although she was not hired. Regardless, she still continues to wrestle with Women's Extreme Wrestling as well as other independent promotions. In early 2009, Luscious began a feud against PINK, which spanned from River City Wrestling into OWE. On April 18, Luscious defeated PINK to win the OWE Women's Championship.

On August 22, 2009 in River Ridge, LA, Luscious defeated Claudia Del Solis to win the vacant Cajun Wrestling Federation (CWF) Women's Championship.

== Championships and Accomplishments ==
- Cajun Wrestling Federation
  - CWF Women's Championship (1 time)
- Extreme Texas Wrestling
  - ETW Television Championship (1 time)
- Oldskool Wrestling Entertainment
  - OWE Women's Championship (1 time)
- Premier Wrestling Federation
  - PWF Universal Women's Championship (1 time)
- USA Pro Wrestling
  - USA Pro Women's Championship (1 time)
- Women's Extreme Wrestling
  - WEW World Championship (1 time)
  - WEW Tag Team Championship (1 time) - with Angel Orsini
