= Velvet Sky =

American professional wrestler (born 1981)

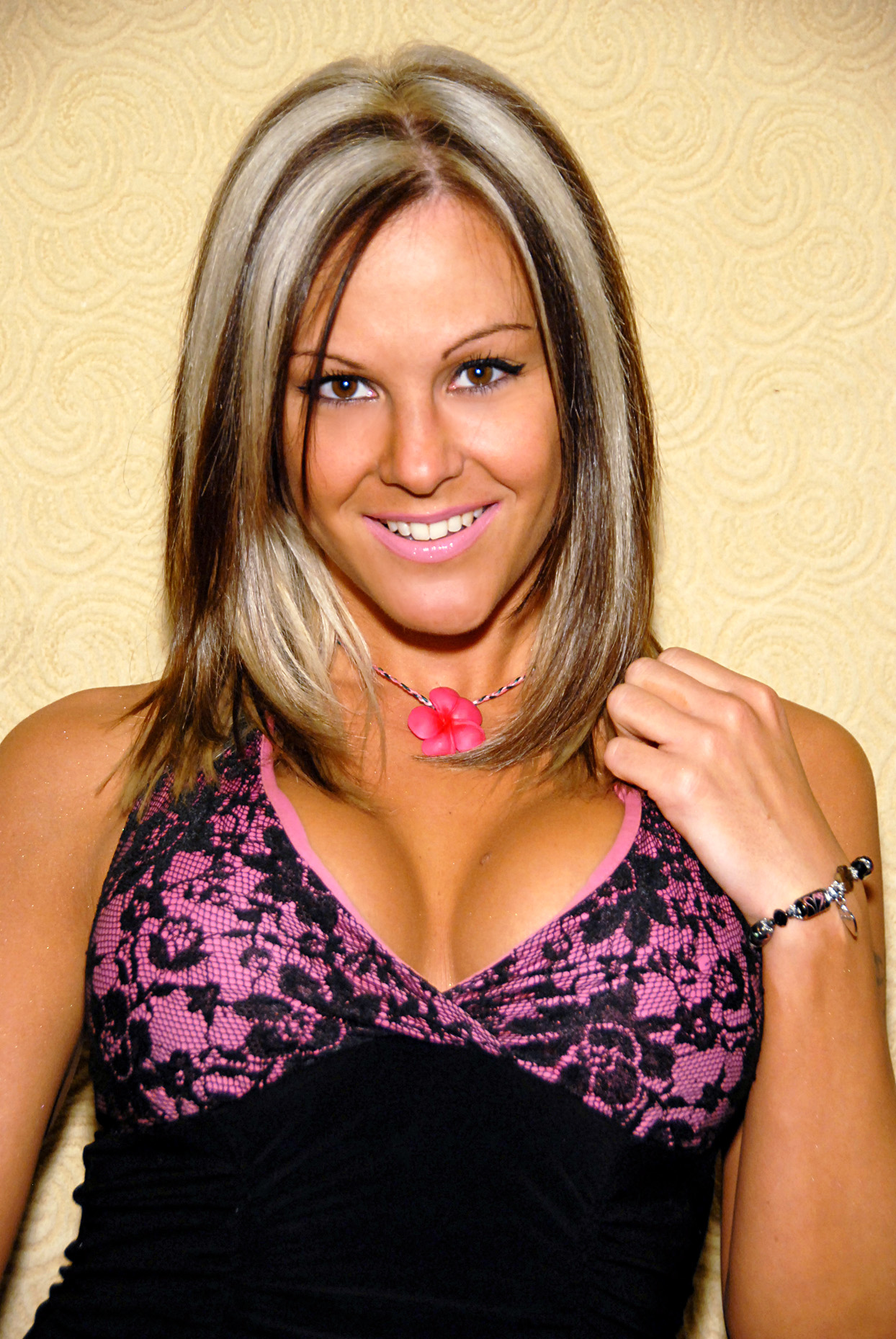
- Sky in 2010

Personal information
- Born: Jamie Lynn Szantyr; June 2, 1981 (age 45) New Britain, Connecticut, U.S.

Professional wrestling career
- Ring name(s): Miss Talia; Talia; Talia Doll; Talia Madison; Velvet Sky
- Billed height: 5 ft 6 in (1.68 m)
- Billed weight: 126 lb (57 kg)
- Billed from: The Big Apple
- Trained by: Jason Knight; Kevin Landry
- Debut: 2003
- Retired: July 6, 2016

Jamie Lynn Szantyr (born June 2, 1981) is an American color commentator and retired professional wrestler best known for her time with Total Nonstop Action Wrestling (TNA) and the NWA under the ring name Velvet Sky. She is a former two-time TNA Women's Knockout Champion and is a former TNA Knockouts Tag Team Champion as part of The Beautiful People (with Madison Rayne and Lacey Von Erich, with the group defending the title under the Freebird rule). While a part of NWA she served as a color commentator.

== Professional wrestling career ==
=== Early Career (2003–2007) ===
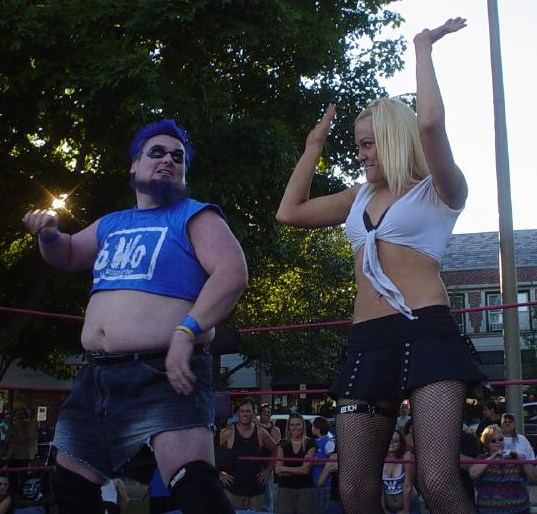
Blue Meanie and Talia Madison in 2005

Szantyr was trained by Jason Knight at the House of Pain Pro Wrestling Dojo in New Britain, Connecticut. After completing her training, she began working as a valet and wrestler on the independent circuit using the ring names Miss Talia, Talia Doll, and Talia Madison. On the independent circuit, she formed a tag team known as T&A with April Hunter.

Talia made her debut for World Xtreme Wrestling (WXW) on March 3, 2004, where she defeated Alere Little Feather. She won her first championship in professional wrestling, the WXW Women's Championship, after winning a battle royal on May 29, 2004. Talia went on to successfully defend her title against April Hunter, Cindy Rogers, Psycho and Ariel. On August 28, Talia teamed up with Alicia in a winning effort defeating Cindy Rogers and Mercedes Martinez in a tag team match, and defeated Becky Bayless in a bra and panties match on September 9. Talia continued her undefeated streak, successfully defending her title against Alere Little Feather, Luscious Lily, Cindy Rogers, Officer Mercy, and against Feather and Alicia in a triple threat match. On November 27, Talia teamed up with April Hunter in a winning effort, defeating The Moonshiners (Lulu and Trinity H. Campbell). On December 11, Talia successfully defended her title against Krissy Vaine. The following week, Talia teamed up with The Moonshiners (Lulu and Trinity H. Campbell) defeating Alicia, Cindy Rogers, and Mercedes Martinez in a six-woman tag team match. Talia's winning streak ended after she was defeated by Martinez on April 25, 2005. On July 8 at the WXW Spotsfest event, Talia lost the championship to Martinez. On September 12 at the WXW Tour, Talia unsuccessfully challenged Martinez for the title in a rematch. At the WXW 4th Annual Women's Elite 8 event, Talia unsuccessfully challenged Martinez again, this time in a triple threat match also involving Krissy Vaine.

Szantyr made a few appearances in World Wrestling Entertainment (WWE) in 2005 and 2006. On the February 24, 2005, episode of WWE SmackDown!She appeared as an extra during the JBL "Celebration of Excellence" party. She was then defeated by Victoria on July 11 in a match taped for WWE Heat. On January 2, 2006, she and Trinity were planted in the front row of the audience to be selected to dance with The Heart Throbs after their match in another Heat segment. She also auditioned for the 2007 Diva Search, but did not make the final eight. As Talia Madison, she held Defiant Pro Wrestling Women's title, which she won on April 8, 2006, after defeating Alere Little Feather and Nikki Roxx in a triple threat match.

Later that year, she debuted in MXW Pro Wrestling and defeated Alere Little Feather at Brass City Battle. She also wrestled in Women's Extreme Wrestling (WEW), where she mainly worked in tag team matches. She found championship success here as half of The Simple Girls/The Madison Sisters with her (kayfabe) sister Nikki Madison, and as the "T" half of the T&A tag team with April Hunter, defeating Team Blondage's Amber O'Neal and Lollipop to win the titles on WEW's April 6, 2006 pay-per-view. She also held the WEW World Women's title, defeating Angel Orsini on May 5, 2007.

=== Total Nonstop Action Wrestling (2007-2012) ===
==== The Beautiful People (2007–2011) ====
When Total Nonstop Action Wrestling (TNA) announced the creation of their women's division in 2007, Szantyr, using her Talia Madison ring name, was announced as one of the ten wrestlers in a 10-woman gauntlet match to crown the first TNA Knockouts Champion at the Bound for Glory pay-per-view. Before the show, she made non-wrestling appearances on the October 5 episode of TNA Today and the October 11 episode of Impact!, standing at ringside for the debut match of Amazing Kong along with the other gauntlet match participants. In the weeks following the gauntlet match, her ring name was changed to Velvet Sky.

At the December Turning Point pay-per-view, Sky and Angelina Love formed an alliance and were dubbed Velvet Love Entertainment, later renamed The Beautiful People. After defeating ODB and Roxxi Laveaux early in the show, Love and Sky assisted Gail Kim in her match against Awesome Kong. They assisted Kim again after another match against Kong on the December 6 episode of Impact!, and at the Final Resolution pay-per-view, helping to stop a post-match brawl.

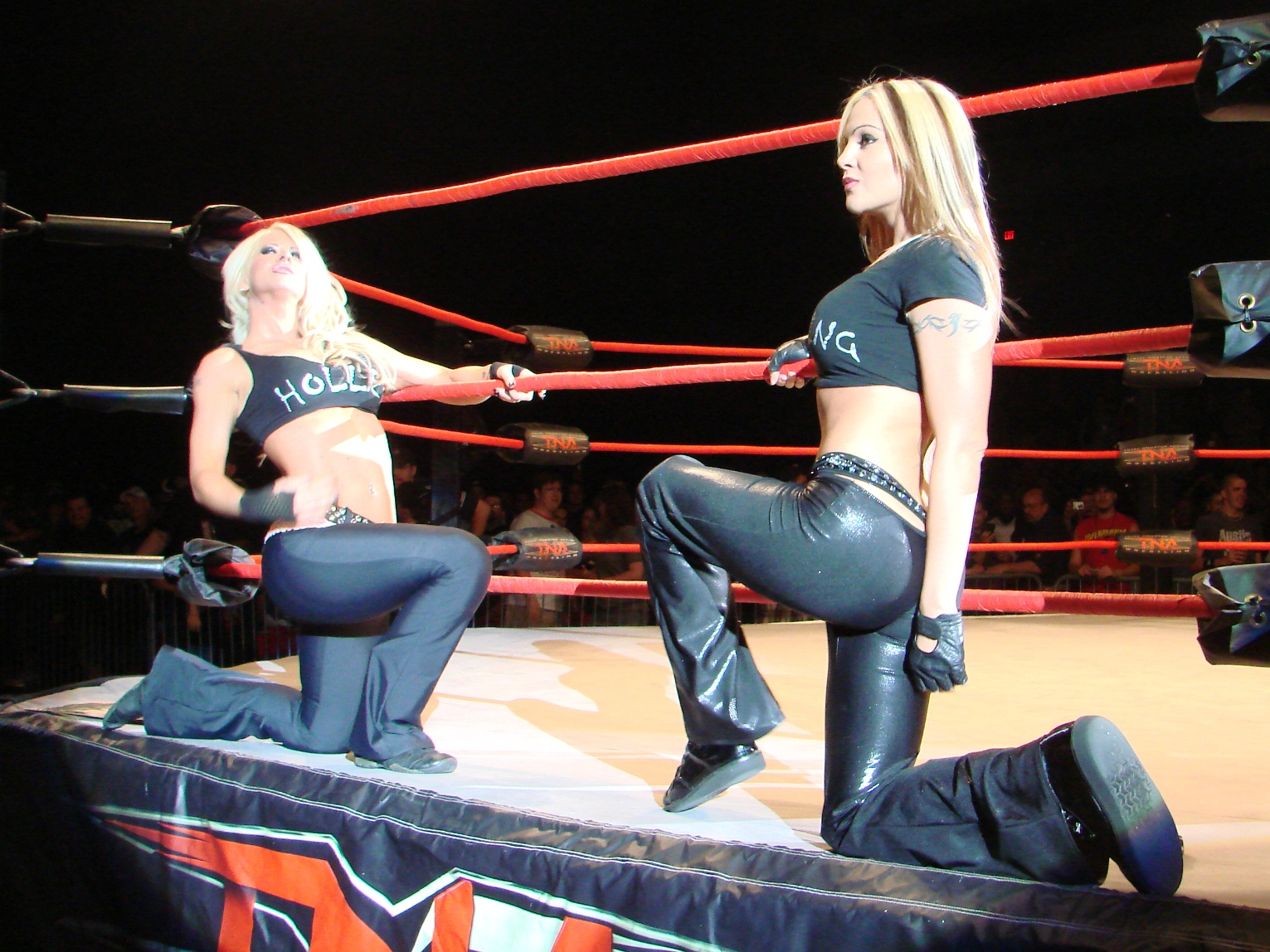
Sky (right) and Angelina Love as The Beautiful People in July 2008

On the March 13 episode of Impact!, Sky and Love attacked Roxxi Laveaux and later that night Gail Kim, thus becoming villainous characters for the first time. At Lockdown, Sky and Love participated in the first ever Queen of the Cage match, which was won by Laveaux, when she pinned Love inside the cage. Sky and Love participated in the Make Over Battle Royal-Ladder Match at Sacrifice, which was won by Gail Kim. Around this time, Sky and Love added another factor to their gimmicks, placing brown paper bags over their opponents heads after defeating them. Soon after, Moose joined The Beautiful People, but she was quickly removed from the stable and the TNA roster after suffering an injury on the independent circuit. On the July 17 episode of Impact!, Sky won a Knockouts battle royal to become the number one contender to the TNA Knockouts Championship, but lost the title match the next week, as well as two more title matches immediately following, to then-champion Taylor Wilde.

The Beautiful People began associating themselves with Cute Kip, who become known as their "fashionist". At Bound for Glory IV, The Beautiful People and Cute Kip were defeated by ODB, Rhaka Khan, and Rhino. In March 2009, the team gained a new member in Madison Rayne, while Kip was "fired" from the stable twice in the following month before finally becoming a road agent for the company. Sky was in Love's corner when she defeated Kong and Wilde to win the TNA Knockouts Championship at Lockdown. Sky was also in Love's corner at Slammiversary, where she helped her defeat Tara by spraying hairspray in her eyes. At Hard Justice, Sky, along with Love, competed in a tag match against ODB and Cody Deaner in a losing effort when Deaner pinned Sky, resulting in Love losing the Knockouts Championship to ODB. After the loss, Madison Rayne was kicked out of The Beautiful People, with the pair vowing revenge in the upcoming tournament for the TNA Knockouts Tag Team Championship. The last of the four quarter final matches pitted The Beautiful People against Rayne and a mystery partner, who was later revealed to be the returning Roxxi. Regardless, The Beautiful People won the match and advanced to the semi-finals.

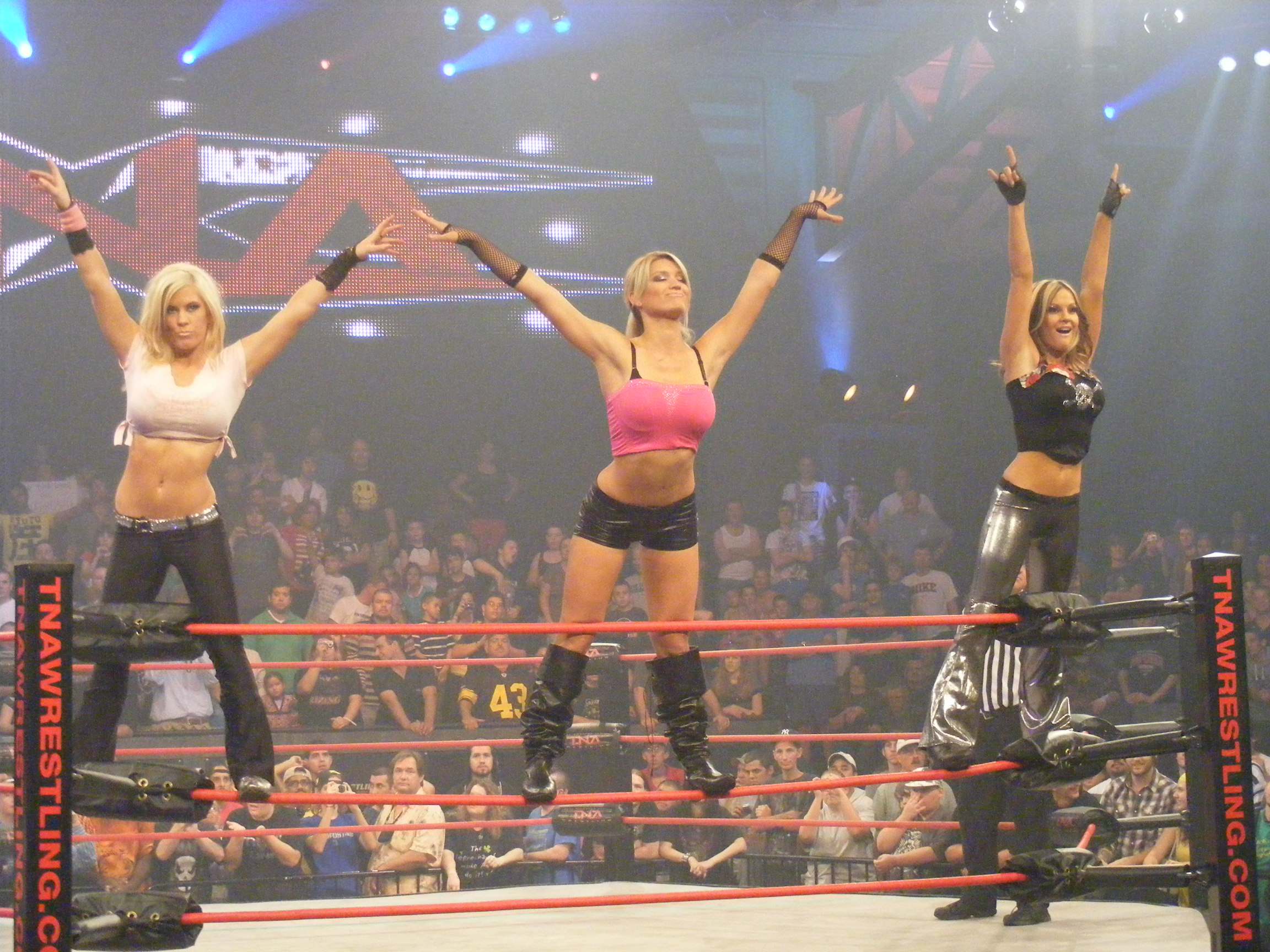
Sky (right), Madison Rayne (left) and Lacey Von Erich (center) in December 2009

After the match was taped, Love was released from her TNA contract due to work visa issues. On the last episode of Impact! taped before her release, Love and Sky advanced to the finals of the tag team tournament by defeating Tara and Christy Hemme after interference from Madison Rayne. Afterwards, Rayne apologized to both Sky and Love, and was then welcomed back into the Beautiful People. At No Surrender, Sky and Rayne were defeated in the finals of the tournament by Sarita and Taylor Wilde. On October 1, Love's replacement Lacey Von Erich made her debut and joined the Beautiful People. Love would return to the company on the January 14, 2010, episode of Impact!, but instead of re-joining the Beautiful People, she attacked them, thus turning Love face.

On the March 8 episode of Impact!, Sky and Rayne defeated the teams of Love and Tara and Sarita and Taylor Wilde in a three-way match to win the vacant TNA Knockouts Tag Team Championship, after interference from Daffney. The three members of the Beautiful People defended the titles under the Freebird rule. On the April 5 episode of Impact!, Sky was one of the four winners of the very first LockBox Showdown Elimination Tag Match. The box she opened contained a contract for Sky to challenge anyone of her choosing at any time, regardless of the stipulation. Sky then announced that she would be using her contract to face the new Knockouts Champion Angelina Love in a Leather and Lace match the following week. With Sky and Madison Rayne scheduled to receive a shot at the Knockouts Championship at Lockdown, the Beautiful People turned the Leather and Lace match into a three-on-one beat down, in order to soften Love up for the pay-per-view the following Sunday. At the pay-per-view, Rayne and Sky defeated Love and Tara, and Rayne became the new Knockouts Champion. Sky faced Love once again on the June 24 episode of Impact, and won by disqualification after receiving a DDT onto a steel chair, just like Von Erich the previous week.

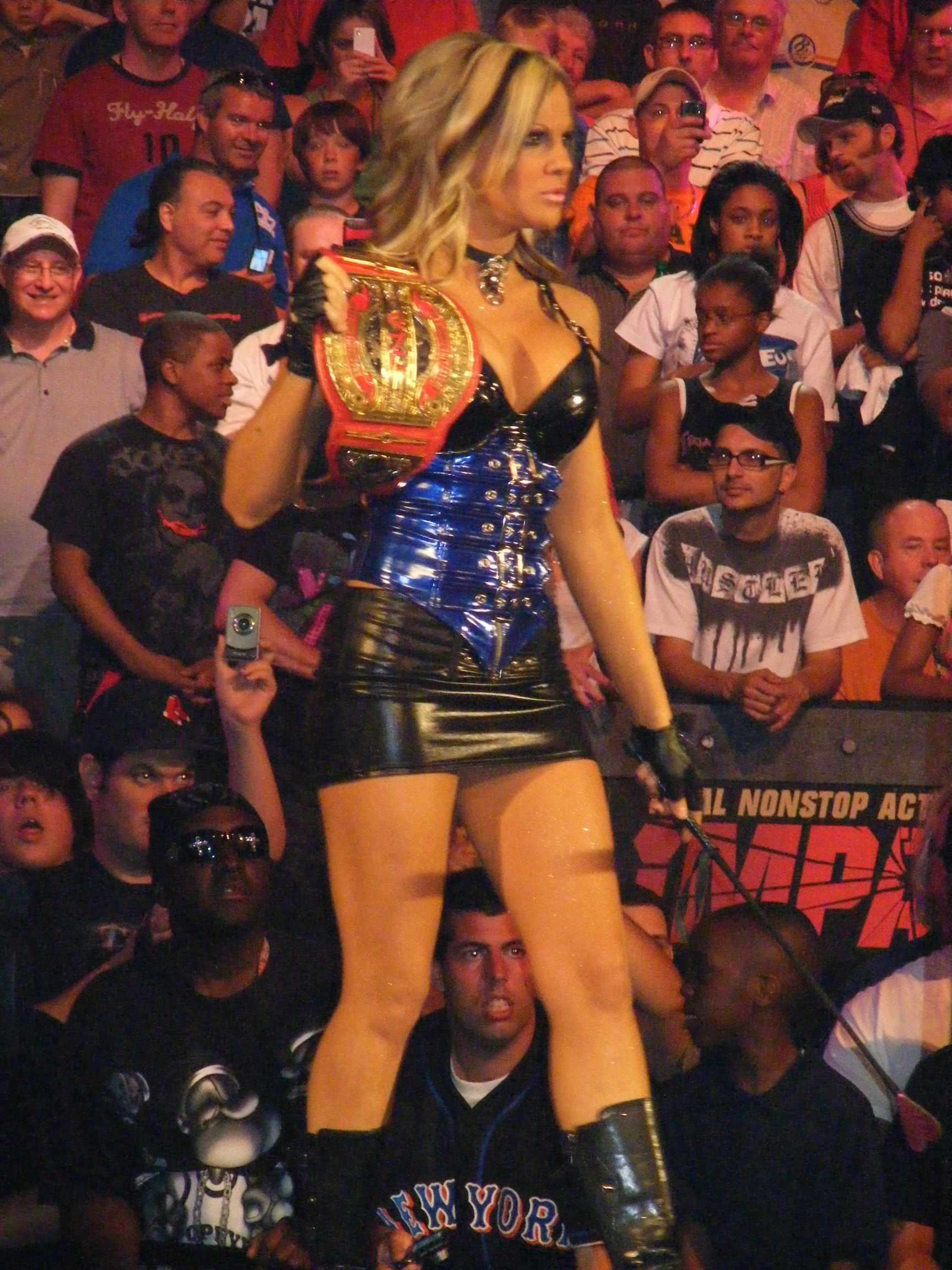
Sky with the TNA Knockouts Tag Team Championship belt

In the summer of 2010, Sky began showing signs of a face turn, when Rayne began talking down to her and Von Erich, declaring that she did not need either of them, and then recruited a mystery woman hiding behind a motorcycle helmet to help her in her feud with Angelina Love. On the July 22 episode of Impact!, Sky refused to go along with Rayne, the mystery woman and Sarita, when they all finished assaulting Love and Taylor Wilde.

On the August 5 episode of Impact!, Sky and Von Erich lost the TNA Knockouts Tag Team Championship to Hamada and Taylor Wilde, when Rayne's and the mystery woman's interference backfired. The following week, Sky cemented her face turn by attacking the mystery woman during Rayne's title match with Angelina Love, and in doing so caused a distraction, which cost Rayne the Knockouts Championship. On the August 19 episode of Impact!, Sky reunited with Angelina Love, accompanying her to the ring and helping her successfully defend the Knockouts Championship against Rayne. After the match, Sky and Love were beaten down by Rayne and the mystery woman.

Rayne's mysterious ally was finally unmasked as Tara on the September 2 episode of Impact!, when the two of them defeated Sky and Love in their first match together in a year. At No Surrender, Sky defeated Rayne in a singles match. Lacey Von Erich would join Sky and Love, after being saved by them from Rayne and Tara on the September 16 episode of Impact!. Von Erich, however, would leave the promotion two months later on November 11.

In October, Sky entered a feud with Sarita, who would score back–to–back pinfall victories over her on the October 28 and the November 4 episodes of Impact!, first in a six-Knockout tag team match and then in a singles match. On the December 9 episode of Impact! Sky and Love defeated Sarita and Daffney in the first round match of a tournament for the vacant Knockouts Tag Team Championship, but Sky was still unable to pin Sarita. Two weeks later, Sarita attacked Sky prior to her and Love's tournament final match. As a result, Winter, who had been stalking Love for the past months, took Sky's place in the match and teamed with Love to defeat Madison Rayne and Tara to win the Knockouts Tag Team Championship. The following week, Sarita defeated Sky in a Strap match. On the January 27 episode of Impact!, Sky brawled with Winter, claiming she was trying to break up the Beautiful People. Sarita pinned Sky once again on the February 17 episode of Impact! in a tag team match, where she teamed with Rosita. After the match, Sky challenged Sarita to a one–on–one match, where she agreed to put her career on the line. On the March 3 episode of Impact!, Sky was finally able to defeat Sarita in a singles match, salvaging her career in the process. On March 13 at Victory Road, Sky inadvertently cost Love and Winter the Knockouts Tag Team Championship in a match against Sarita and Rosita. On the March 24 episode of Impact!, Winter, seemingly having control over Love's actions, prevented her from saving Sky from a beat down at the hands of Sarita and Rosita. On the April 7 episode of Impact!, Love, still under Winter's influence, turned heel on Sky during a Knockouts Tag Team Championship match against Sarita and Rosita, and left her to be pinned by the champions, effectively ending the Beautiful People.

==== TNA Knockout Championship pursuits (2011–2012) ====
On the April 28 episode of Impact!, Angelina Love defeated Sky by submission in a singles match, no-selling all of her opponent's offense during the match. On the May 5 episode of Impact!, Sky pinned Winter in a two–on–three handicap match, where she teamed with Kurt Angle to face Winter, Love and Jeff Jarrett, announcing her intention of becoming the TNA Knockouts Champion in the process.

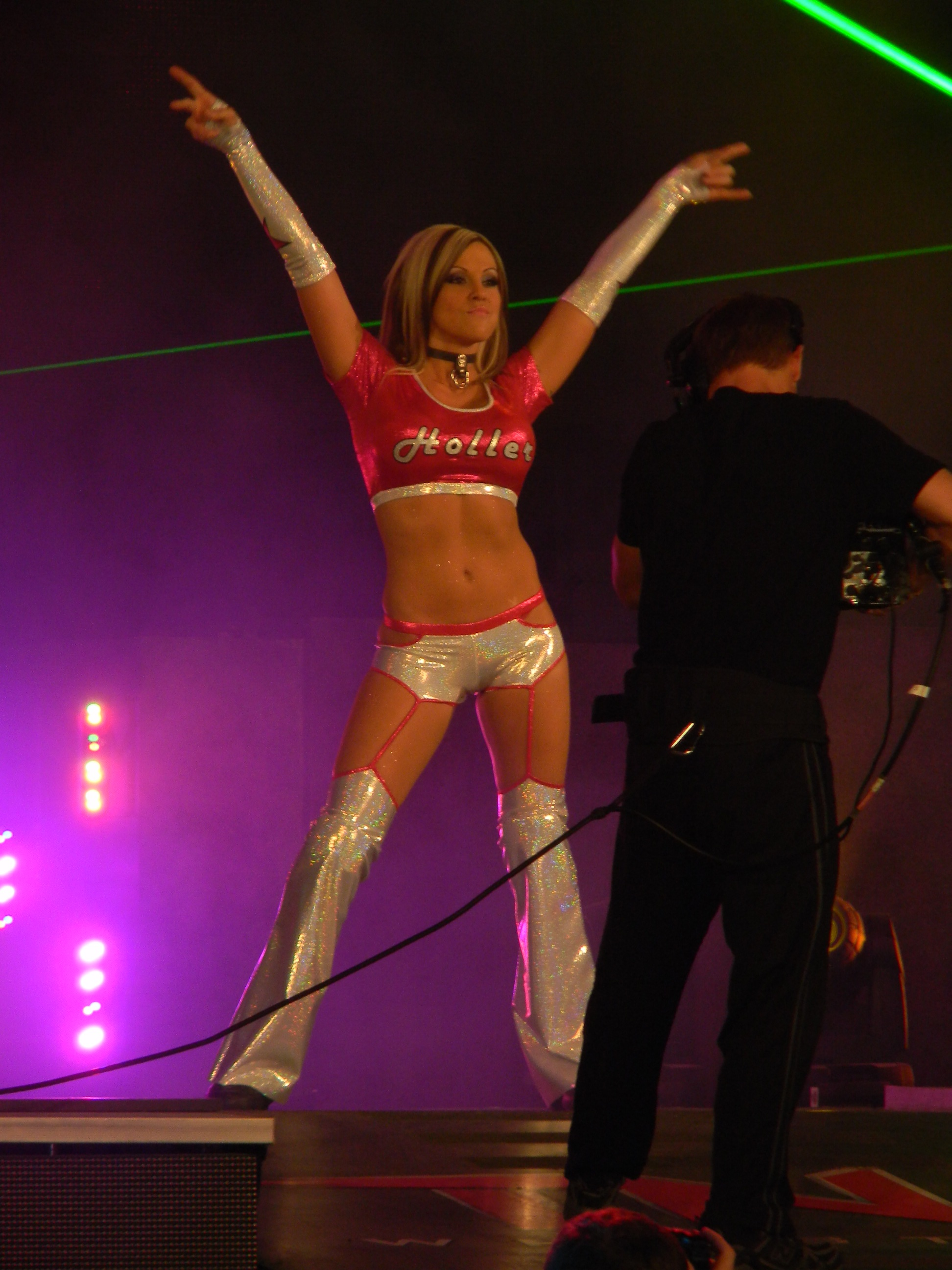
Sky in 2011

On the May 19 episode of Impact Wrestling, Sky defeated Love and Winter in a two–on–one handicap match, but was afterwards attacked by the returning ODB, who claimed that she had gotten fired from TNA the previous June because of Sky. Sky and ODB faced each other in a singles match on the June 9 episode of Impact Wrestling, with Sky emerging victorious.

The following week, Sky and Ms. Tessmacher failed in their attempt to win the TNA Knockouts Tag Team Championship from Rosita and Sarita due to interference from ODB. Afterwards, Sky was beaten down by ODB and her new tag team partner, Jacqueline. On the June 12 episode of Impact Wrestling, Sky and Tessmacher were defeated by Jacqueline and ODB in a tag team match. The feud seemingly ended on the July 7 episode of Impact Wrestling, when Sky defeated ODB and Jacqueline in a two–on–one handicap match, forcing both of them out of TNA as per stipulation of the match. On the July 21 episode of Impact Wrestling, Knockouts Champion Mickie James awarded Sky a shot at her title, but before the match could take place, James was attacked by Angelina Love and Winter. When Sky tried to make the save, she was attacked by the returning ODB and Jacqueline, who were then in turn attacked by the also returning Traci Brooks.

On the September 15 episode of Impact Wrestling, Sky defeated Angelina Love to qualify for a four-way Knockouts Championship match at Bound for Glory. On October 16 at Bound for Glory, Sky won the Knockouts Championship for the first time by defeating previous champion Winter, Madison Rayne and Mickie James in a four-way match, when Traci Brooks replaced original special guest referee Karen Jarrett, and counted the deciding pinfall. On the October 20 episode of Impact Wrestling, Sky came to the ring and thanked the fans for supporting her. During her speech, she was attacked by the returning Gail Kim. On November 13 at Turning Point, Sky lost the Knockouts Championship to Gail Kim, ending her reign at 28 days. On the January 26 episode of Impact Wrestling, Sky and Mickie James were defeated by Tara in a three-way number one contenders match for the Knockouts Championship. On the April 5 episode of Impact Wrestling, Sky defeated Angelina Love, Madison Rayne, Mickie James, Tara and Winter in a six-way match to become the number one contender to Gail Kim's Knockouts Championship. On April 15 at Lockdown, Sky unsuccessfully challenged Kim for the title in a steel cage match. Sky received a rematch for the championship on the May 17 episode of Impact Wrestling, but was again defeated by Kim in a three-way match, which also included Brooke Tessmacher.

The following month, Sky and Mickie James ignited a feud, with James slowly turning villainous due to her jealousy of Sky. However, after weeks of inactivity, on July 24, it was reported by numerous wrestling sites that Szantyr was close to leaving TNA, after failing to come to terms on a new contract with the promotion. Two days later, Szantyr confirmed her departure from TNA, however, she was still listed as an active member of the roster on the company's website.

=== Lucha Libre AAA World Wide (2011) ===
On June 18, 2011, Sky made her debut for Mexican promotion Lucha Libre AAA World Wide at Triplemanía XIX, where she teamed with Angelina Love, Mickie James and Sexy Star to defeat Cynthia Moreno, Faby Apache, Lolita and Mari Apache in an eight-woman tag team match. On September 8, AAA announced that Sky would return to the promotion on October 9 at Héroes Inmortales. At the pay-per-view, Sky teamed with Jennifer Blake and Sexy Star to defeat Cynthia Moreno, Faby Apache and Mari Apache in a six-woman tag team "Glow in the Dark" match.

=== Return to the independent circuit (2012) ===
From June 30 to July 2, 2012, Sky took part in World Wrestling Council's (WWC) Anniversario weekend in Puerto Rico. On the first two nights, she was defeated in singles matches by Melina and, on the final night, she and Xix Savant defeated Melina and Davey Richards in a mixed tag team match.

Velvet made her debut for Bad Boys of Wrestling Federation (BBWF) on September 8 at the BBWF Caribbean Wrestling Bash Aruba The Legend Tour, where she competed against Angelina Love in a winning effort. The following night on the BBWF Caribbean Wrestling Bash Aruba The Legend Tour, Sky competed against Angelina Love in a losing effort.

Following her departure from TNA, Sky reunited with Angelina Love as the Beautiful People on September 22, 2012, at a Northeast Wrestling event, where they were defeated by Madison Rayne and Rosita. Sky made her debut for Family Wrestling Entertainment (FWE) on October 4, 2012, at the Back 2 Brooklyn internet pay-per-view, where she teamed up with Angelina Love to defeat the FWE Women's Champion Maria Kanellis and Katrina Lea in a tag team match. Sky made her debut for Maryland Championship Wrestling (MCW) on October 27 at MCW Monster Mash event, where she teamed up with Angelina Love in a winning effort defeating Jessie Kaye and Niya in a tag-team match.

=== Return to TNA (2012-2016) ===
==== Knockouts Champion (2012–2013) ====
On the December 6 episode of Impact Wrestling, Sky made her return during an in-ring segment between Mickie James and Knockouts Champion Tara, where she vowed to become champion again. The following week, Sky won her return match by defeating Madison Rayne. On January 13, 2013, at Genesis, Sky won a five-woman gauntlet match by last eliminating Gail Kim, to become the number one contender to the Knockouts Championship. On the following episode of Impact Wrestling, Sky again defeated Kim in a rematch to reaffirm her status as number one contender. The following week, Sky unsuccessfully challenged Tara for the championship after Tara's boyfriend Jessie interfered on her behalf. On the January 31 episode of Impact Wrestling, Sky teamed up with James Storm and defeated Tara and Jessie in a mixed tag team match, after Sky pinned Tara.

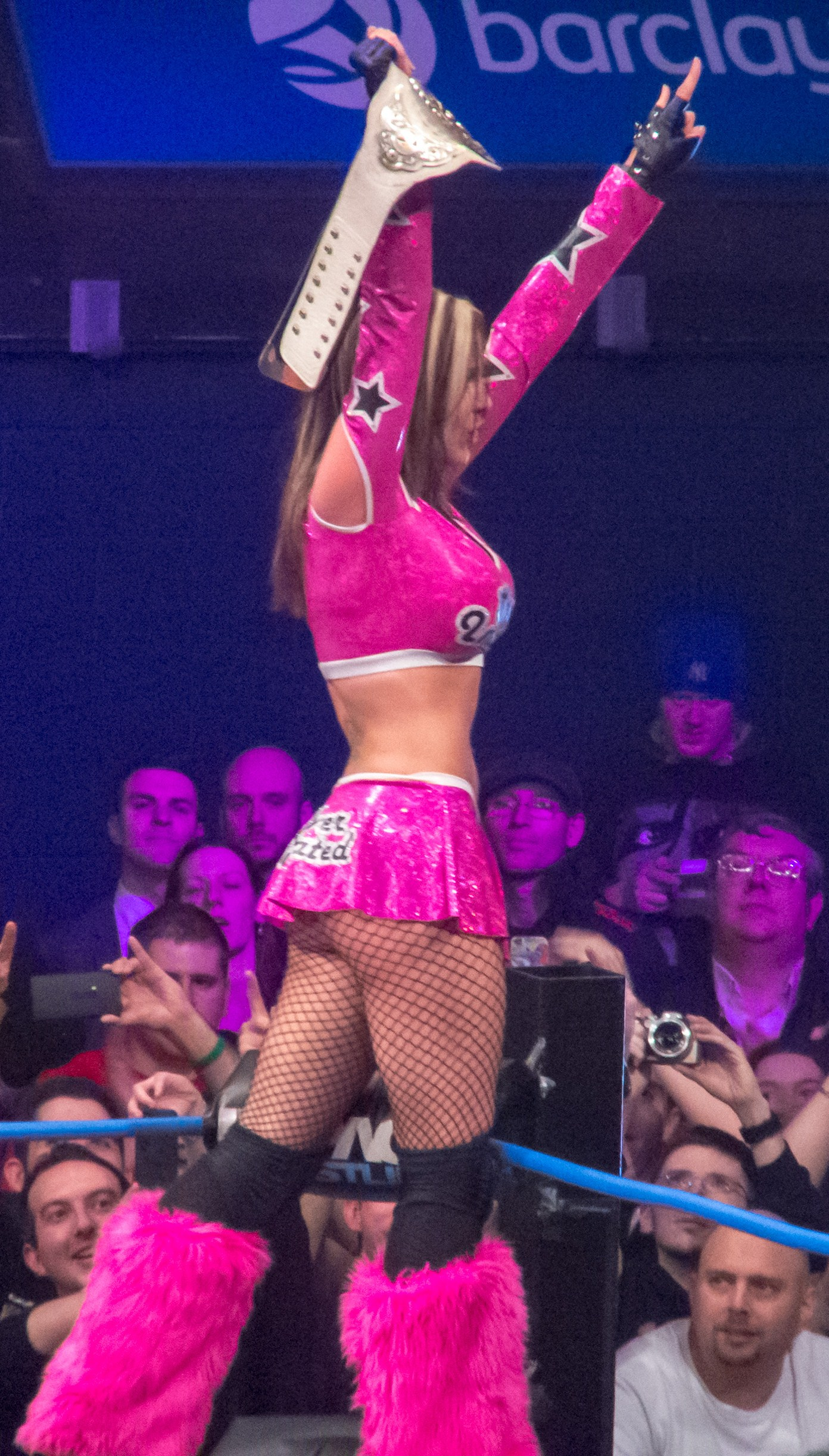
Sky as the TNA Knockouts Champion

On the February 21 episode of Impact Wrestling in London, England, Sky defeated Tara, Miss Tessmacher and Gail Kim in a fatal four-way elimination match, by last eliminating Kim to win the Knockouts Championship for the second time. Sky made her first successful title defense on the February 28 episode of Impact Wrestling, defeating Tara. On March 10 at Lockdown, Sky defeated Gail Kim to retain the championship. On the March 28 episode of Impact Wrestling, Sky saved Taryn Terrell from an attack from Gail Kim and Tara. The following week, Sky teamed up with Terrell in a losing effort to Kim and Tara, after the special guest referee Joey Ryan made a fast count on Terrell. After the match, Terrell gave Ryan a low blow when Sky distracted him. TNA then announced that Sky had suffered a knee injury during the match. Despite the injury, Sky successfully defended the Knockouts Championship against Mickie James on the April 25 episode of Impact Wrestling. On the May 23 episode of Impact Wrestling, Sky lost the championship to James, ending her reign at 117 days. In the following weeks, Sky would demand a rematch, but James would reply by avoiding her and later attacking Sky, as well as taking advantage of her injured leg, turning James villainous in the process. Sky and James eventually their rematch on the June 27 episode of Impact Wrestling, where James won by submitting Sky. Sky returned on the July 25 episode of Impact Wrestling, saying that she had made the mistake of letting James know she was injured, and that she would never make that mistake again, and Sky then sat ringside during James' title match with Gail Kim. Sky was supposed to team with ODB in a Knockouts hardcore tornado tag team match against Gail Kim and Mickie James at Hardcore Justice, however, Sky was not medically cleared to compete because of her knee injury, and the match was altered to a Knockouts triple threat hardcore match.

==== Relationship with Chris Sabin (2013–2014) ====
In mid–September 2013, Sky entered a romantic storyline with newly turned heel Chris Sabin (her real life boyfriend at the time), despite being a face herself. Sky would eventually help Sabin win the X Division Championship from his rival Austin Aries, and helped him successfully defend it multiple times on Impact Wrestling. On the January 30, 2014 episode of Impact Wrestling, Sky reunited with her former Beautiful People partner Madison Rayne in a tag team match against Gail Kim and Lei'D Tapa, which they would win when Sky pinned Kim. After the match, Sky ended her relationship with Sabin. On the February 6 episode of Impact Wrestling, Sky was confronted by Sabin and challenged to a match which took place the following week, but the match never started after Alpha Female attacked Sky and aligned herself with Sabin. This would lead to tag team matches between Sky and Alpha Female, where Rayne and Sky were defeated by Female and Tapa on the February 27 episode of Impact Wrestling. After the match, they were attacked by Tapa, Gail, and Female until ODB came to their aid. This led to a six–woman tag team match, where Sky, Rayne and ODB defeated Female, Tapa and Kim, when Sky pinned Female.

==== The Beautiful People reunion (2014–2016) ====
On the March 13 episode of Impact Wrestling, Sky was called out by the returning Angelina Love, who wanted to reunite The Beautiful People, and a week later on Impact Wrestling, Sky accepted Love's offer, while Madison Rayne would decline. On the March 27 episode of Impact Wrestling, Sky turned heel by attacking Rayne during her match with Love, allowing Love to get the win. The Beautiful People made their in–ring return as a team the following week on Impact Wrestling, defeating Rayne and Brittany, after Love pinned Brittany. On the April 17 episode of Impact Wrestling, Sky unsuccessfully competed in a street fight against Rayne. On the May 1 episode of Impact Wrestling, The Beautiful People celebrated Love's record setting TNA Knockouts Championship win at Sacrifice. The celebration was interrupted by Gail Kim, which allowed Rayne and Brittany to strip Sky and Love of their evening gowns. This led to the Beautiful People defeating Rayne and Brittany in a tag team elimination evening gown match the following week. Sky was defeated by Kim on the May 15 episode of Impact Wrestling, after Kim issued a challenge for any member of The Beautiful People to wrestle her. The following week, Love issued an open challenge for her Knockouts Championship, which was accepted by Brittany, who was unsuccessful in her attempt. After the match, The Beautiful People humiliated Brittany by smearing lipstick on her face and placing a paper bag over her head, resulting in Kim coming to Brittany's aid and attacking Sky and Love. Sky would then aid Love in numerous title defenses against Rayne, Kim and Brittany. The Beautiful People interrupted the return celebration of Taryn Terrell, which lead to a tag team match June 26 episode of Impact Wrestling, where Sky and Love lost to Terrell and Gail Kim. On the June 26 episode of Impact Wrestling, Love lost the Knockouts Championship to Kim, despite interference from Sky. On the July 24 episode of Impact Wrestling, The Beautiful People would interrupt a championship match between Kim and Terrell, which led to Sky unsuccessfully challenging Kim for the title in a four-way match also involving Love and Terrell on the August 14 episode of Impact Wrestling. The feud between The Beautiful People and Gail Kim ended on the August 20 Impact Wrestling: Hardcore Justice special episode, where, despite Sky's interference, Kim defeated Love in a Last Knockout Standing match. At Bound for Glory, Sky faced Havok for the Knockouts Championship, but she was unsuccessful.

During this time, Love and Sky formed an alliance with The BroMans (Robbie E and Jessie Godderz). On the January 23 episode of Impact Wrestling during the Feast or Fired match, Sky grabbed a briefcase for Robbie E, and because Sky had retrieved the briefcase, she was forced by Robbie to open it, revealing a "fired" slip. Later, it was revealed that Sky's contract had legitimately expired, and TNA had opted not to renew it.

On the May 8, episode of Impact Wrestling, Sky made her return to TNA, emerging from the audience to attack Angelina Love, thus, turning face in the process and ending her association with The Beautiful People. On the May 29, 2015, episode of Impact Wrestling, Love brought out her own personal security team and provoked Sky, who was sitting in the audience; Sky jumped the barricade and attacked Love, but was removed from the arena by Love's security team. On the June 25 episode of Impact Wrestling, Sky defeated Love to secure her spot on the roster.

Sky made her in-ring return on the July 8 episode of Impact Wrestling, defeating Madison Rayne. On the August 26 episode of Impact Wrestling, Sky received a Knockouts Championship match against Brooke, but she was attacked by The Dollhouse (Jade and Marti Bell) during the match. Sky was later attacked by Rebel, who joined The Dollhouse. On the following week's episode of Impact Wrestling, Sky fought The Dollhouse again, only to be assisted by Angelina Love and Madison Rayne, thus reuniting The Beautiful People. On April 22, 2016, Sky left the company for the third time, with her being written off the Impact Wrestling series by being told that she was being put in a match against new Knockout roster member Sienna, with her job in TNA on the line if she were to lose the match, which she did by pinfall.

=== Return to independent circuit and retirement (2016–2017) ===
Sky returned to the independent circuit in a six-person tag team match as she teamed with So Over (Jimmy Preston and Mark Shurman) and defeated Jake Manning, Kamaitachi and Sumie Sakai. At MCW Autumn Armageddon Tour 2016, Sky would team with Bully Ray and Drolix to defeat Damian Martinez, Ken Dixon and Kennadi Brink in a No Disqualification six-person tag team match.

On July 6, 2016, Szantyr announced her retirement to focus on going back to college. She would later state that she was retired from in-ring action, but not from professional wrestling as a whole, as she would still do appearances.

=== Ring of Honor Wrestling (2019–2020) ===
==== The Allure alliance stable (2019–2020) ====
On April 6, 2019, at ROH G1 Supercard, Velvet Sky officially reunited with Angelina Love and formed a new heel stable with Mandy Leon as The Allure by attacking Kelly Klein-who had just defeated Mayu Iwatani to regain the ROH Women of Honor World Championship,-as well as Jenny Rose and Stella Grey. During Masters of the Craft (2019) on April 14, 2019, during the match between Nick Lendl and Amy Rose, The Allure was seen with selfie sticks and phones out as they walked down the ramp to where the bell ringer was and kicked her out. After the match Mandy Leon was seen confronting Amy Rose followed by Sky spraying hairspray in her eyes. In October 2020, her profile was removed from the ROH website.

=== National Wrestling Alliance (2021–2023) ===
On March 23, 2021, Sky made her NWA debut as the show's new color commentator, working beside Joe Galli and Tim Storm.

On September 8, 2023, Sky announced she was departing from the NWA on good terms, expressing an interest to continue doing commentary and not active in-ring roles.

=== Return to Impact Wrestling (2023, 2025) ===
On September 14 at Impact 1000, Sky along with Angelina Love made a return to TNA, after a seven-year absence, confronting Gail Kim and the Knockouts. On September 2025, it was announced Love and Sky will be inducted into the TNA Hall of Fame.

== Other media ==
On January 24, 2009, she appeared as a soccerette on British television program Soccer AM, along with Angelina Love. Szantyr was featured on MTV's Made alongside A.J. Styles, Taylor Wilde, and Angelina Love in September 2009. In December 2009, Szantyr appeared in Muscle & Fitness Magazine, alongside Angelina Love.

In November 2010 she was a contestant on an all TNA week of Family Feud, teaming with Angelina Love, Christy Hemme, Lacey Von Erich and Tara against Jay Lethal, Matt Morgan, Mick Foley, Mr. Anderson and Rob Van Dam. In June 2012, she was featured in Montgomery Gentry's music video for their song "So Called Life". She has also made a cameo appearance in an episode of Impractical Jokers.

== Personal life ==
Szantyr has Polish and Italian heritage in her family. In high school, Szantyr competed in cheerleading, softball, cross-country, football, and track. She is close friends with Beautiful People tag team partners, Angelina Love and Lacey Von Erich.

She was previously in a relationship with fellow TNA wrestler Chris Sabin, which ended in 2014. From 2014 to 2021, Szantyr was in a relationship with fellow TNA wrestler Bully Ray, and was engaged to be married. However, the pair split in late 2021.

== Championships and accomplishments ==
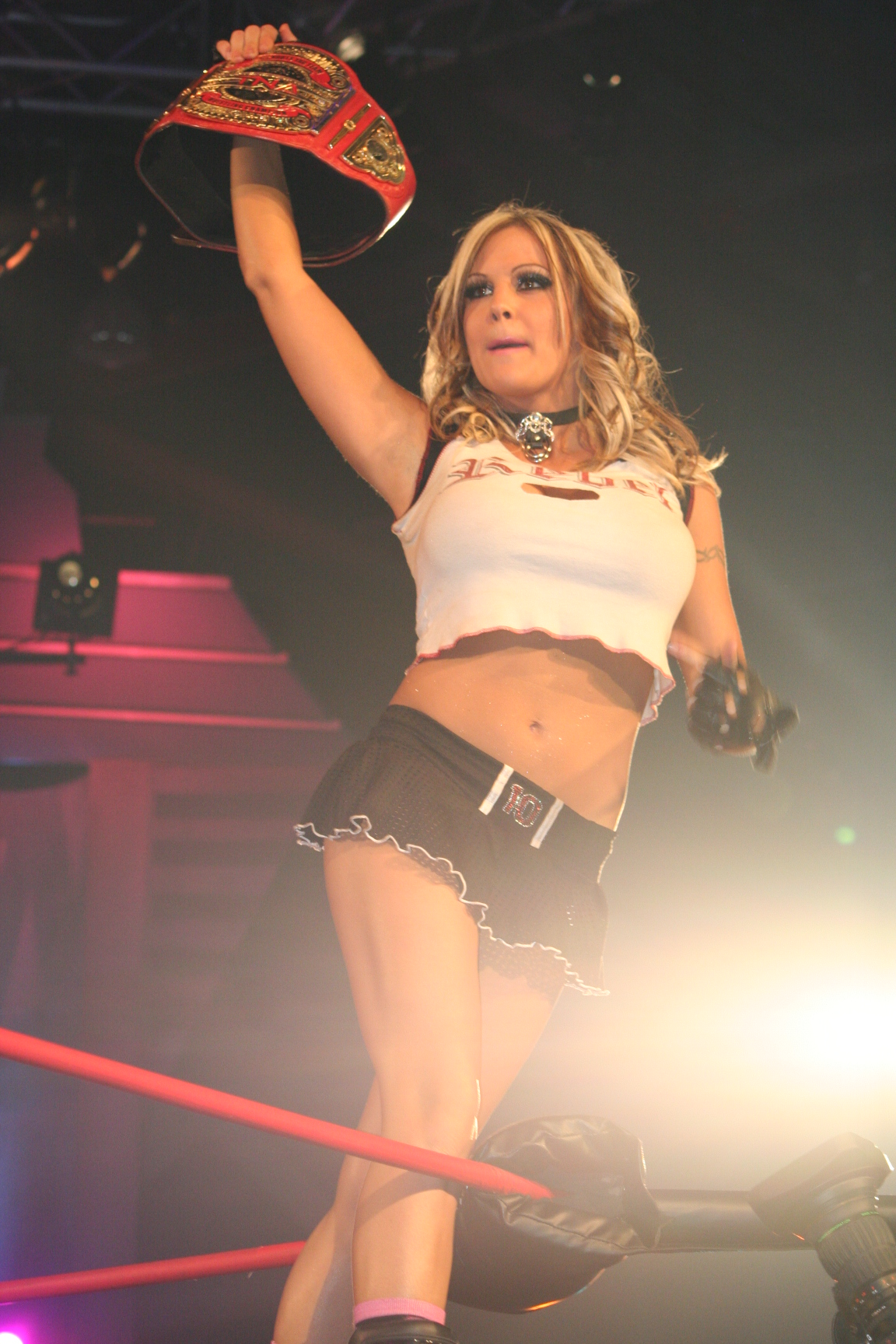
Sky as the TNA Knockouts Tag Team Champion

- Defiant Pro Wrestling
  - DPW Women's Championship (1 time)
- Georgia Wrestling Alliance
  - GWA Ladies Championship (1 time)
- Models Mania
  - Woman of the Year (2013)
- Pro Wrestling Illustrated
  - Ranked No. 11 of the top 50 female wrestlers in the PWI Female 50 in 2013
- Pro Wrestling Insider
  - Female Hottie of the Year (2009)
- TNT Pro Wrestling
  - TNT Women's Championship (1 time)
- Total Nonstop Action Wrestling
  - TNA Knockouts Tag Team Championship (1 time) (Note: Sky defended the title with either Von Erich or Rayne under the Freebird Rule.) – with Lacey Von Erich and Madison Rayne
  - TNA Women's Knockout Championship (2 times)
  - Feast or Fired (2015 – Pink Slip)
  - TNA Hall of Fame (Class of 2025) - with Angelina Love
- Universal Wrestling Association
  - UWA Women's Tag Team Championship (1 time) – with Ariel
- Women's Extreme Wrestling
  - WEW World Championship (1 time)
  - WEW World Tag Team Championship (2 times) – with April Hunter (1) and Tiffany Madison (1)
- Women's Wrestling Hall of Fame
  - WWHOF Award (1 time)
    - Broadcaster of the Year (2023)
- World Xtreme Wrestling
  - WXW Women's Championship (1 time)
