= Amber O'Neal =

American professional wrestler

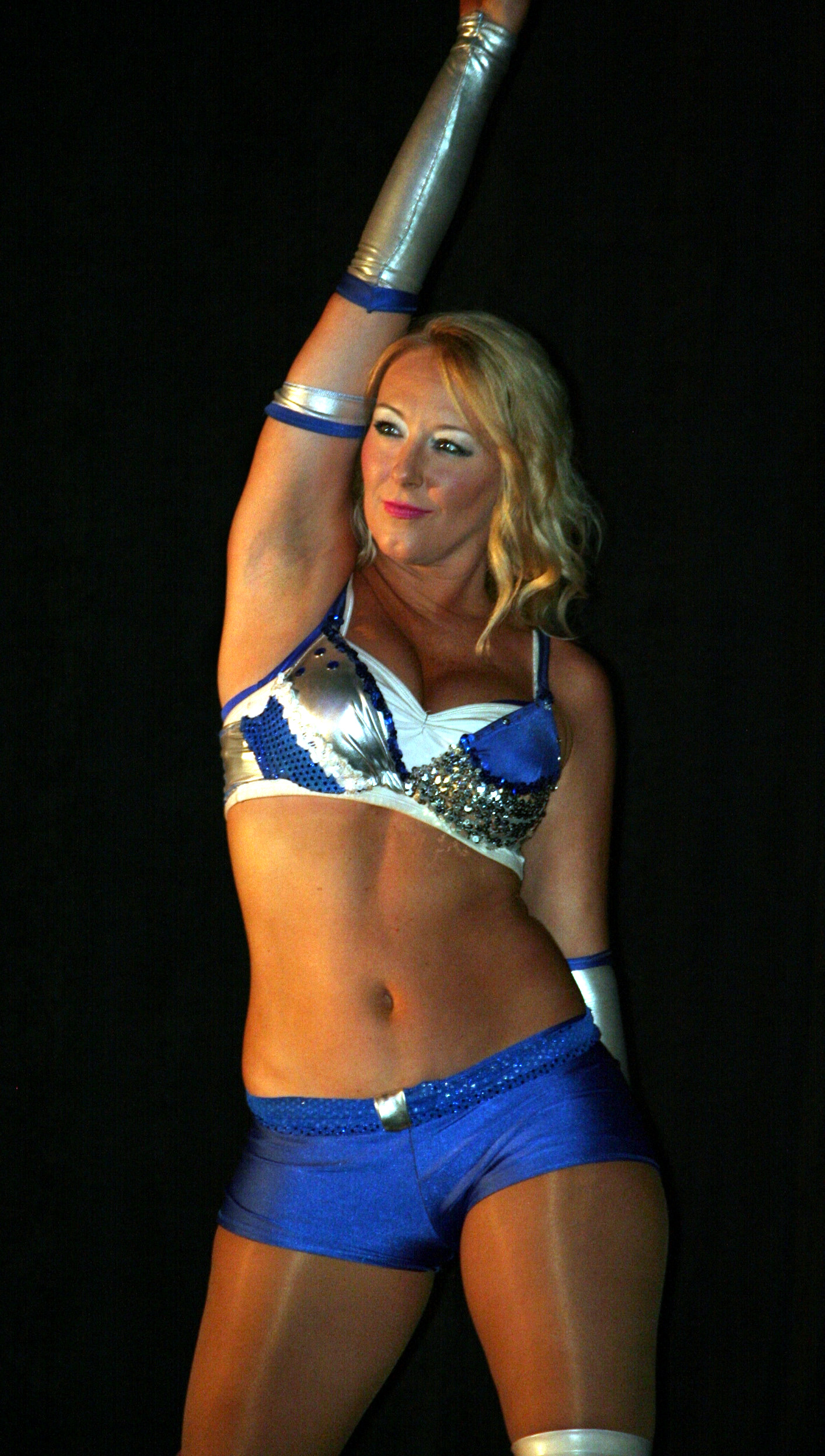
- O'Neal in 2014

Personal information
- Born: Kimberly Dawn Davis; June 22, 1974 (age 52) Ahoskie, North Carolina, U.S.
- Spouse: Doc Gallows (m. 2014; div. 2017)

Professional wrestling career
- Ring name(s): Amber Holly; Amber Gallows; Amber O'Neal 'Bullet Babe' Amber Gallows; Charlotte; The Beverly Hills Babe
- Billed height: 5 ft 8 in (173 cm)
- Billed weight: 140 lb (64 kg)
- Billed from: Malibu, California; Greenville, North Carolina
- Trained by: Strawberry Fields; Gemini Kid; Leilani Kai; Gary Royal; Mikael Yamaha
- Debut: July 1999

Kimberly Dawn Davis (born June 22, 1974) is an American professional wrestler, better known by her ring name Amber O’Neal.

She formerly wrestled in Ring of Honor (ROH) in their "Women of Honor" division as well as various promotions on the U.S. independent circuit. She has also appeared in New Japan Pro-Wrestling (NJPW) as a valet for the villainous Bullet Club stable, where she was billed as Amber Gallows. She was also NWA World Women's Champion, during her stint as a Bullet Club member.

== Professional wrestling career ==
=== Early career (1999–2003) ===
Davis got into wrestling after watching it with a friend who was a fan of Stone Cold Steve Austin. Davis initially became a fan of Sable. After researching how to get involved with the sport, Davis trained under Strawberry Fields, Leilani Kai, and Gary Royal at the Mid-Atlantic Wrestling Academy in Charlotte, North Carolina. After training for six months, she debuted in July 1999 in the Professional Girl Wrestling Association (PGWA) as Amber Holly, wrestling Leilani Kai in Maggie Valley, North Carolina. She also worked with Desiree Paterson and Riptide. In 2002, Holly began wrestling for the Carolina Wrestling Federation (CWF), where she furthered her training under Gemini Kid and Mikael Yamaha at the CWF Dojo Camp. While a part of the company, she defeated Kai for the CWF Women's Championship. In May 2003, Holly suffered a knee injury during a match with Brandi Alexander, to whom she later lost the CWF title. She tore her anterior cruciate ligament and patella tendon, as well as suffering cartilage damage. She was obliged to undergo reconstructive surgery and was inactive for approximately a year.

=== Team Blondage (2004–2005, 2009) ===
Holly returned to the ring on May 16, 2004, adopting the ring name Amber O'Neal and the gimmick of a motocross racer. She changed her name because of her respect for Nora Greenwald, who used the ring name Molly Holly. Greenwald helped O'Neal in her tryout matches with World Wrestling Entertainment (WWE).

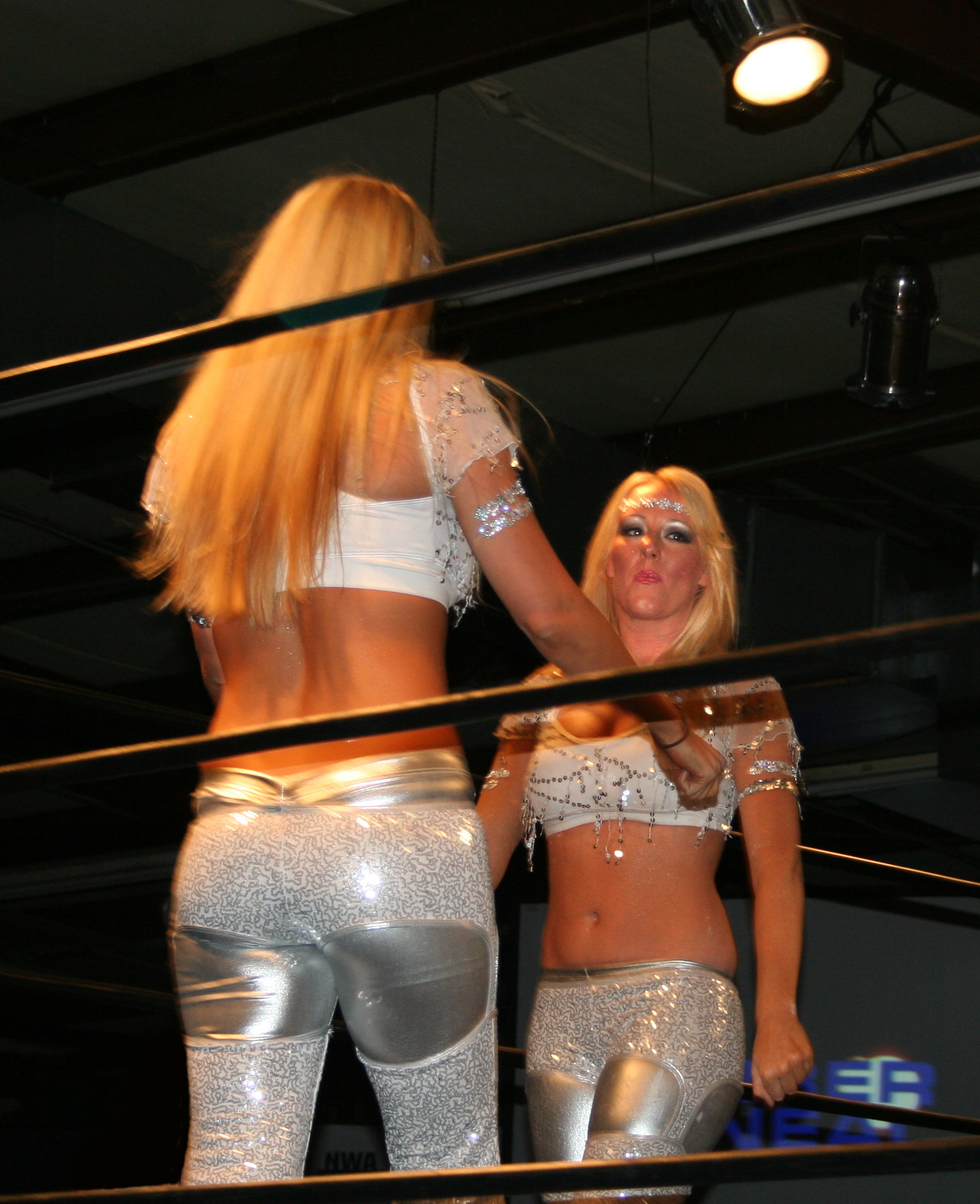
O'Neal and Vaine in 2005

In late 2004, O'Neal formed a tag team with Krissy Vaine known as Team Blondage. The team wrestled primarily on the North Carolina independent circuit, appearing with promotions such as Shimmer and Women's Extreme Wrestling. Team Blondage defeated Clehopatra and Navaho to win the vacant WEW Tag Team Championship on May 8, 2005 at the WEW pay-per-view "No Ho's Barred". In the course of their reign, Vaine signed a contract with WWE. Vaine was subsequently replaced within Team Blondage by Total Nonstop Action Wrestling alumna Lollipop. On the April 6, 2006 WEW pay-per-view, O'Neal and Lollipop lost the WEW Women's Tag Team Championship to T and A (Talia and April Hunter).

After a long term hiatus prior leaving WWE and the wrestling business for over a year, it was announced that Krissy Vaine decided to return to the wrestling industry and reunite with her Team Blondage partner, Amber O'Neal. They have now announced themselves as Team Blondage 2.0, and in their debut match they defeated against the established Scream Queens (Daffney and MsChif). On March 7, they defeated Persephone and Kristin Flake in CWF.

=== Shimmer Women Athletes (2005–2009) ===
O'Neal was part of the first Shimmer show where she teamed with Krissy Vaine to defeat the team of Nikki Roxx and Cindy Rogers. Later in the night she lost a singles match to Christie Ricci.

After Vaine signed a WWE contract, O'Neal moved into singles competition and lost to both Cindy Rogers in a triple threat elimination match also including Tiana Ringer, and Nikki Roxx. She got her first singles victory against the debuting Serena Deeb on Volume 5 but later in the night she lost to Serena in a rematch.

On October 22, 2006, as part of Volume 7, she was defeated by Allison Danger. Later in the night however she got a victory by pinfall over Josie after hitting with her STO Finishing Manoeuvre. At the Volume 9 and 10 taping, she lost to both Daizee Haze and MsChif via pinfall.

She did not compete in the Shimmer Championship tournament, and lost to Portuguese Princess Ariel on Volume 14. She then lost to "The Jezebel" Eden Black and Lorelei Lee on Volume 15 and 16 but she was able to score a third pinfall victory over Lorelei Lee as part of Volume 17. Later in the night however she lost to Shark Girl. She missed Volume 19 and 20, and returned to Shimmer for Volumes 21 and 22, where she lost to Wesna Busic and Mercedes Martinez. On May 2, 2009, at the tapings of Volume 23, she defeated the debuting Tenille with a backslide, but went on to lose to Jennifer Blake as part of Volume 24, and LuFisto.

=== Total Nonstop Action Wrestling (2006, 2009) ===
In April and May 2006, O'Neal wrestled at several TNA house shows produced in conjunction with the United Wrestling Federation. O'Neal also made a televised appearance in 2006 against Gail Kim. O'Neal appeared on the edition of June 5, 2008 of TNA Impact!. She was planted in the audience along with fellow wrestlers Daffney and Becky Bayless, with the three of them volunteering to wrestle Awesome Kong in the "$25,000 Challenge". Daffney was selected and subsequently lost to Kong. O'Neal returned at the December 21, 2009, Impact! tapings, where she was defeated by Lizzy Valentine in a tryout dark match.

=== National Wrestling Alliance (2008–2010, 2015–2016) ===
O'Neal made her debut for National Wrestling Alliance (NWA)'s promotion Mid-Atlantic Championship Wrestling on the August 9, 2008, episode of MACW Television Tapings, where she competed against Kristin Flake in a winning effort. On the edition of September 10 of MACW Television Tapings, O'Neal defeated TNA Knockout Daffney in singles competition. On the edition of January 10 of MACW Television Tapings, O'Neal gained another victory over Daffney. On the edition of February 21 of MACW Television Tapings, O'Neal teamed up with Krissy Vaine in a winning effort defeating The Scream Queens (Daffney and MsChif) in a tag-team match. On the edition of March 14 of MACW Television Tapings, O'Neal continued her winning streak when she competed against the debuting Persephone in a winning effort.

On the edition of May 15 of MACW Television, O'Neal defeated the debuting Jayme Jameson in a singles match. On the edition of July 11 of MACW Summer Bash pay-per-view, O'Neal undefeated streak ended when she competed against Christie Ricci in a losing effort. This would turn out to be O'Neal final match in Mid-Atlantic Championship Wrestling due to NWA Mid-Atlantic Championship Wrestling folding early 2010.

In March 2009, O'Neal made her debut for National Wrestling Alliance (NWA)'s promotion NWA Charlotte in a match against Daffney. Amber O'Neal switched with Krissy Vaine, who got the pinfall over Daffney for her tag team partner. On the edition of May 15 of NWA Charlotte TV Tapings, O'Neal defeated the debuting Jayme Jameson after the interference from Krissy Vaine. On the edition of May 23, 2009 of NWA Charlotte Total Compliance pay-per-view, O'Neal defeated Jayme Jameson after Krissy Vaine switched with her to become the first NWA Charlotte Women's Champion. She would turn out to be the title's only holder due to NWA Charlotte folding in late 2009.

On December 18, 2015, Gallows captured the NWA World Women's Championship from Santana Garrett. She lost the title against Jazz on September 17, 2016.

=== Women Superstars Uncensored (2009–2010) ===
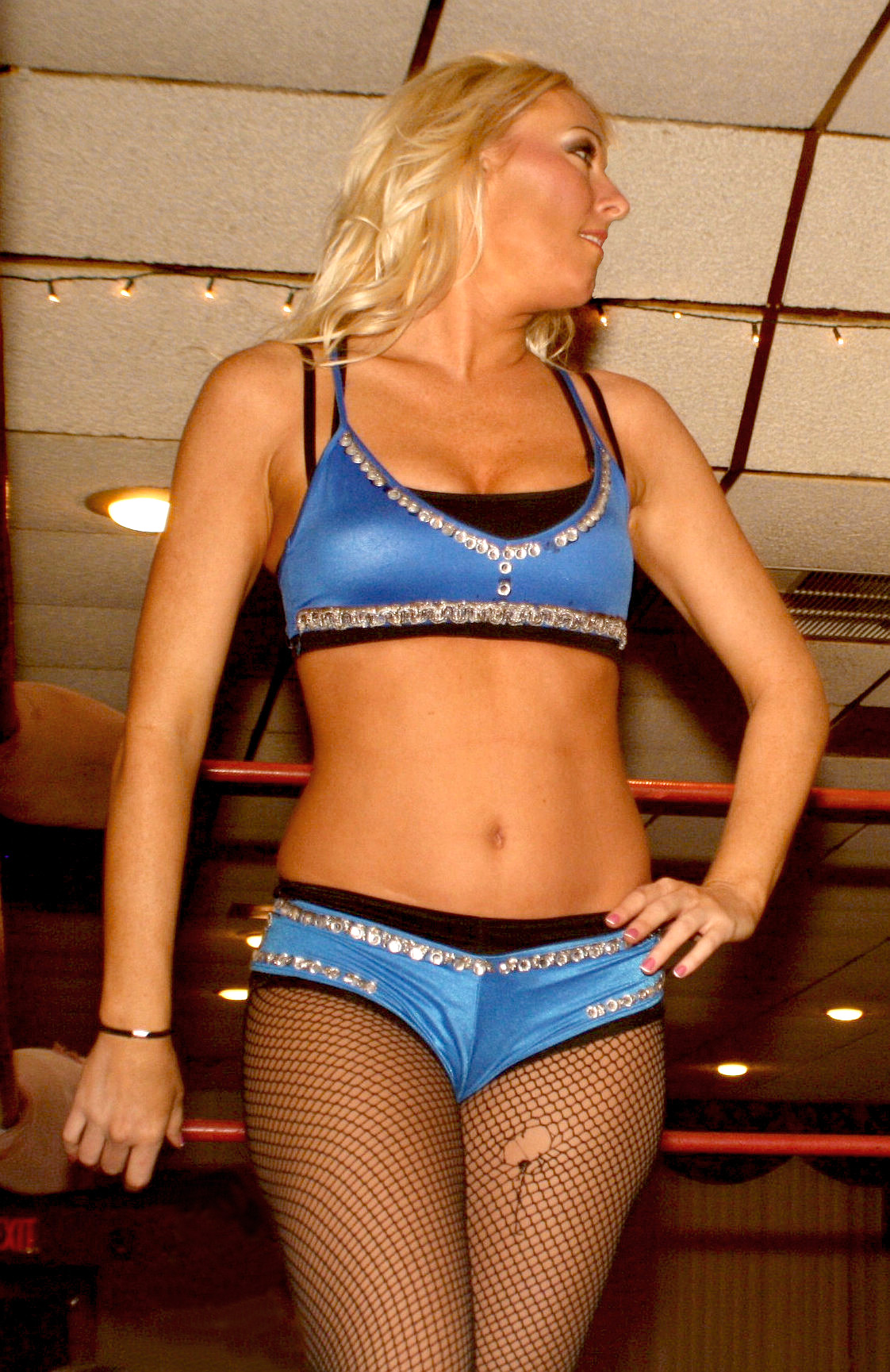
O'Neal at a Women Superstars Uncensored show in 2010.

O'Neal debuted for Women Superstars Uncensored (WSU) on August 22, 2009, in a victorious effort against Annie Social. Later in the night she got another victory over "The Definition of Technician" Cindy Rogers. O'Neal continued her winning streak as she defeated Sassy Stephanie in a Special Challenge Match on November 3 and later in the night she defeated the WSU Hall of Famer Malia Hosaka.

On December 12, O'Neal defeated Sumie Sakai to continue her winning streak. Later in the night, it was announced that O'Neal would put her winning streak on the line against Jazz at the Third Anniversary Show. O'Neal was successful in defeating Jazz and was subsequently named by Dawn Marie as the number one contender to the WSU World Championship. At the April 2, 2010 episode of WSW 4th Annual J-Cup, O'Neal unsuccessfully challenge reigning champion Mercedes Martinez, thus ending her winning streak.

At the WSU/NWS King & Queen Of The Ring Tournament 2010 pay-per-view, O'Neal competed in King and Queen tournament teaming with Bison Bravado but was eliminated in the first round by Jazz and Balls Mahoney. At the WSU Uncensored Rumble III pay-per-view, O'Neal competed in the Uncensored Rumble to determine the number one contender to the WSU Championship but failed to win the match after it was won by Jazz. Later that event, O'Neal teamed up with Nikki Roxx in a losing effort to Angel Orsini and Jazz.

=== Other promotions (2010–present) ===
On October 23, 2010, O'Neal made an appearance for Pro Wrestling Superstars, where she made her debut losing to Mickie James in a singles match. O'Neal made her debut for SCWA Wrestling, defeating Persephone with a bridging backslide. At the PWX An Evil Twist of Fate event on October 5, O'Neal defeated Reby Sky after throwing dust in her face and hitting a sitout facebuster.

O'Neal also took part in the first season tapings of Wrestlicious, which took place in early 2009, but did not start airing until March 2010. In the promotion, she uses the ring name Charlotte, the Southern Belle. She made her in-ring debut on March 1 in the main event of the first episode of Takedown, teaming with Tyler Texas and Cousin Cassie in a losing effort to the team of Felony, Maria Toro and Bandita after getting hit by a Fisherman's Buster. On the fifth episode, which aired on March 31, she got her first victory after teaming with Paige Webb against the Naughty Girls (Faith and Hope). On the edition of April 7 of Takedown, Charlotte participated in a Hoedown Trowdown battle royal to determine the top two contenders for the Wrestlicious Crown. She unsuccessfully competed after being eliminated by Brooke Lynn.

O'Neal debuted for Shine Wrestling as a babyface on May 24, 2013; competing against Ivelisse in a losing effort as Shine 10. At Shine 12 on August 23, Amber teamed with Santana Garrett in defeating Malia Hosaka and Brandi Wine, after a singles match between Santana and Wine ended in a no contest due to involvement by Hosaka. On September 28, at the Shine 13, Amber and Santana, now known as The American Sweethearts faced The S-N-S Express (Jessie Belle Smothers and Sassy Stephie), but lost when Stephie pinned O'Neal after a Kiss My Sass. A month later at Shine 14, the Sweethearts teamed with Leva Bates in a losing effort to the Express, which also included Nevaeh. At Shine 15 on December 13, the Sweethearts were once again defeated by the Express, and per the stipulation, Amber and Santana were forced to disband. In singles action, Amber suffered losses to La Rosa Negra and Tracy Taylor at Shine 16 and 18, respectively. At Shine 20 on June 27, 2014, Amber was defeated by Crazy Mary Dobson, who replaced Leah Von Dutch, via DQ. During the match, Amber turned into a villainess and attacked Dobson with a steel chair, which led to the DQ decision. After the match ended, the evil Amber gave the Bullet Club gesture to Dobson, similar to that of the wrestling stable which has her real-life husband, Doc Gallows, as a member.

On December 5, Davis adopted the new ring name Amber Gallows, the "Bullet Babe". On January 4, 2015, O'Neal made her debut for New Japan Pro-Wrestling (NJPW) at Wrestle Kingdom 9 in Tokyo Dome, where she accompanied her husband and Karl Anderson to a match, where they lost the IWGP Tag Team Championship to Hirooki Goto and Katsuyori Shibata. On April 6, it was announced that O'Neal, billed as Amber Gallows, would be returning to NJPW the following month at Wrestling Dontaku 2015 to take part in the promotion's first match involving female wrestlers since October 2002. In the match, Gallows, her husband and Karl Anderson were defeated by Maria Kanellis, Matt Taven and Michael Bennett.

=== Women Of Wrestling (2012–present) ===
O'Neal signed with David McLane's Women of Wrestling (WOW) promotion in December 2012. She debuted at WOW! Pandemonium Tour 2013 losing to Jungle Grrrl in singles competition. Later in the night, she came together with fellow WOW newcomer Santana Garrett to form the tag team The All-American Girls. The pair then successfully challenged and defeated Caged Heat for the WOW Tag Team Championship, ending Caged Heat's remarkable 10-year reign. However, on the third season of WOW, Caged Heat's attorney Sophia Lopez was able to convince WWA (Women Wrestling Association) That they should vacate The All American Girls' championship. As The All American Girls faced Caged heat in the first round of the vacated WOW Tag Team Championship, O'Neal turned on Garrett, causing them their match. With Lana Star as the manager of O'Neal, she was able to book O'Neal in a WOW World Championship match, as O'Neal changed her name to The Beverly Hills Babe. In the season finale, The Beverly Hills Babe unsuccessfully challenged Jungle Grrrl to her championship, as her former ally Garrett pinned her in a triple threat match to win the championship.

With WOW returning to television on AXS TV beginning in early 2019, The Beverly Hills Babe continued to wrestle under Lana Star's management through the first season on the network. On the September 10, 2019 episode of the show, with the ongoing WOW Tag Team Championship Tournament, Star told The Beverly Hills Babe that the winner between her and Faith the Lioness would be Star's partner on the tournament. The Beverly Hills Babe lost to Faith, and Star cut ties with her. The Beverly Hills Babe changed her name back to Amber O'Neal, as she teamed with Jessie Jones in the tournament. The team were eliminated during the second round as they lost to Adrenaline and Fire.

=== Ring of Honor (2016) ===
During the year 2016 Amber O'Neal made her Ring of Honor (ROH) debut in the ROH Women of Honor division in a match against Kennadi Brink on the November 2, 2016th episode of ROH's Women of Honor but was unsuccessful as Brink was victorious in the match.

== Personal life ==
Outside of wrestling, Davis is a medical aesthetician and owns a spray tanning business called Amber Glo. She cites Jeff Hardy, Matt Hardy, and Trish Stratus as her favorite wrestlers.

== Championships and accomplishments ==
- Carolina Championship Wrestling
  - CCW Women's Championship (1 time)
- Carolina Wrestling Federation
  - CWF Women's Championship (1 time)
- Global Championship Wrestling
  - GCW Women's Championship (1 time)
- National Wrestling Alliance
  - NWA World Women's Championship (1 time)
- North American Championship Wrestling
  - NACW Women's Championship (1 time)
- NWA Charlotte
  - NWA Charlotte Women's Championship (1 time)
- NWA Carolinas Pro Wrestling
  - NWA Carolinas Women's Championship (1 time)
- Pro Wrestling Illustrated
  - Ranked No. 27 of the top 50 female wrestlers in the PWI Female 50 in 2009
- Professional Girl Wrestling Association
  - Rookie of the Year (2000)
- Women's Extreme Wrestling
  - WEW Tag Team Championship (2 times) – with Krissy Vaine (1) and Lollipop (1)
- Women of Wrestling
  - WOW Tag Team Championship (1 time) – with Santana Garrett
