= Lorelei Lee (wrestler) =

American wrestler

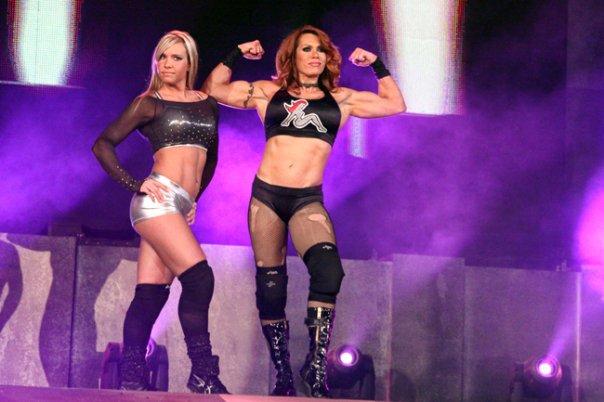
- Lorelei Lee (left) with April Hunter

Personal information
- Born: Amy Janas; June 22, 1982 (age 44) Sewickley Hills, Pennsylvania, USA

Professional wrestling career
- Ring name(s): Lorelei Lee; Lorelei; Tyler Texas
- Billed height: 5 ft 5 in (1.65 m)
- Billed from: Sewickley Hills, Pennsylvania; Austin, Texas
- Trained by: Lexie Fyfe
- Debut: 2004
- Retired: 2012

Amy Janas (born June 22, 1982), better known by her ring name Lorelei Lee, is an American former professional wrestler. She is best known by her appearances in Shimmer Women Athletes.

== Professional wrestling career ==
=== Mason-Dixon Wrestling (2006–2007) ===
Lee made her debut for Mason-Dixon Wrestling (MSW) at the MDW event on August 4, 2006, where she defeated Sin D in a singles match. Later that event, she teamed up with Serena Deeb in winning effort defeating Amber O'Neal and Jessica Dalton in a tag-team match. The following night at a MDW event, Lee won a Blackberry Rumble. Later that event, she teamed up with Thrillbilly Ox in a winning effort defeating The Masked Assassins in a tag-team match.

=== Shimmer Women Athletes (2006–2008) ===
Lee debuted in 2006, on Volume 3 of Shimmer defeating the villainous veteran Malia Hosaka by pinfall after an Oklahoma roll only to be attacked by Hosaka and her partner Lexie Fyfe after the match before Cindy Rogers made the save. On Volume 4, the team of Fyfe and Hosaka, now known as The Experience defeated Lee and Rogers in a tag team match. On Volumes 6 and 7, she lost to Rain and Nikki Roxx respectively. Her losing streak continued on Volumes 7 and 8 where she was defeated by Tiana Ringer and Lexie Fyfe in one-on-one matches. After a break from Shimmer, she came back on Volume 15 where she and Ashley Lane were defeated by Portia Perez and Nicole Matthews in a tag team match. On Volume 16, she gained her second victory by pinning Amber O'Neal and on Volume 17, she lost a rematch to O'Neal. On Volume 18, she lost once again to Nicole Matthews before being injured at the hands of Amazing Kong on Volume 19.

=== Wrestlicious (2008–2010) ===
On April 30, 2008, Lee signed a contract with Wrestlicious, she had her try-out match with Daizee Haze. In the promotion she will go by the ring name Tyler Texas. She debuted in the main event of the first episode teaming with Charlotte and Cousin Cassie losing to the team of Felony, Maria Toro and Bandita. She debuted in her singles match defeating Maria Toro.

=== Total Nonstop Action Wrestling (2009) ===
On the December 31, 2009 edition of Total Nonstop Action Wrestling's Impact!, Lee appeared as a heel and teamed with April Hunter in a losing effort against the Knockouts Tag Team Champions Sarita and Taylor Wilde.
