= Professional Girl Wrestling Association =

US wrestling promotion

- Acronym: PGWA
- Founded: 1992
- Style: Women's professional wrestling
- Headquarters: North Carolina
- Founder: Tom Randolph
- Website: LadySports.com

The Professional Girl Wrestling Association (PGWA) is an American women's professional wrestling promotion. The aim of the PGWA is to preserve and promote "Old School" Women's professional wrestling. Based in North Carolina, the organization frequently sponsors matches and whole cards in the Mid-Atlantic and Mid-South states, as well as in Mexico and the United Kingdom through partnerships with other regional promotions. From its founding in 1992 until her death in mid-2008, the Commissioner of the PGWA was Penny Banner.

== Purpose ==
The company sets up wrestling matches for independent female wrestlers—wrestlers that are not signed to a major company—video tapes the matches and sells them to help promote their careers. Because the women do not sign exclusive contracts, they are free to wrestle in other promotions or major wrestling companies. Unlike many female-only wrestling organizations, PGWA does not overly emphasize the sexuality of the female wrestlers, nor does it promote them as "eye-candy", but rather stresses their skills and ability.

PGWA matches tend to run 15 to 30 minutes, as opposed to the usual 5 to 10 minutes often allotted female wrestlers by promoters. This allows wrestlers to display a full range of their abilities, rather than having to focus on a few key moves in the short span of time their match allows.

== History ==
The Professional Girl Wrestling Association (PGWA) was founded in 1992 in North Carolina by sportswriter Tom Randolph. Randolph brought a video camera to one of Susan Green's training sessions and later videotaped a match between her and Judy Martin. Green later became the promotion's first champion.

In 2002, the promotion began holding events in the United Kingdom and Europe. The 2004 show "Summer Heat", filmed in Nashville, Tennessee, had the largest card in the promotion's history to that time with 16 women wrestling at the event. In October 2004, PGWA co-promoted the first ChickFight tournament, which later became an annual event, with All Pro Wrestling. In November 2008, after the death of Penny Banner, Susan Green became the new commissioner of the PGWA.

== LadySports ==
Concurrent with the launch of the PGWA in 1992, the promotion began selling a women's wrestling newsletter called Connections. Shortly, this was transformed into a quarterly magazine titled LadySports (3 issues of a sister magazine, LadyBoxer, were also published in the late 1990s). The PGWA staff also frequently supplied photographs and feature articles to such newsstand publications as Wrestling Eye, PWI, WOW! and Fighting Females. Since the mid-90s, a LadySports Online website has also been maintained. With the cessation of the quarterly magazine, publishing efforts were shifted to the website, which not only offers downloads of PGWA matches and features on PGWA talent, but also provides coverage for non-PGWA women, from wrestlers to valets and referees.

== PGWA Championship ==
Wrestler:	Times:	Date:	Location:	Notes:
Susan Green	1	1992	Charlotte, North Carolina	
Judy Martin	1	1999		
Susan Green	2	1999		
Angel "Riptide" Orsini	1	2000	Thomasville, North Carolina	
Lexie Fyfe	1	2001	Charlotte, North Carolina	Won the title in a three-way dance against Riptide and Brandi Alexander
Leilani Kai	1	July 2002	Branson, Missouri	Won at the "Battleground: Branson" event
Pippa L'Vinn	1	November 2003	Raleigh, North Carolina	
Nikki Roxx	1	April 23, 2005	Manchester, England	Won at an event entitled "St. George's Daymes"
Tracy Taylor	1	November 15, 2008	Millersville, Tennessee	Won at the "A Banner Night" event
Nemesis	1	April 16, 2011	Millersville, Tennessee	Won at "Spring Fling '11"
ThunderKitty	1	August 4, 2017	Wilmington, Ohio	Relinquished belt May 4, 2018 due to injury
Allie Parker	1	July 4, 2018	Las Vegas, Nevada	Awarded belt after being recognized as the top contender
Jennifer Thomas	1	June 15, 2019	Los Angeles, California	Won at the SessionGirls all-women's PPV Relinquished belt August 15, 2021 due to injury
Kasey Fox	1	September 25, 2021	Mount Airy, North Carolina	Won at the "Darlings of the Ring" all-women's event Relinquished belt on May 1, 2023 due to inability to defend it in a scheduled match
Savannah Sweet	1	May 27, 2023	Covington, Kentucky	Won at the "Revolution Rising II: Queens of the Midwest" all-women's event
Riley Matthews	1	April 27, 2024	West Union, Ohio	

== Rookies of the Year ==
- 1994-Molly McShane
- 1995-Regina Hale
- 1996-Joanie Laurer/Lee (AKA Chyna)
- 1997-Brandi "Babydoll" Collins
- 1998-Strawberry Fields
- 1999-Sweet Destiny (AKA Little Jeanne)
- 2000-Amber Holly (AKA Amber O'Neil)
- 2001-Mia Martinez
- 2002-Christie Ricci
- 2003-Venus

RotY retired

- 2019-Nikki Victory (RotY award revived)
- 2020-Elizabeth
- 2021-Kasey Fox
- 2022-Riley Matthews
- 2023-Savannah Sweet

== RingStar Award Winners ==
- 2023-Nikki Victory (inaugural award)

== See also ==
- List of women's wrestling promotions
