= Session wrestler =

Wrestlers who fight an opponent as a service

Session wrestlers, also known as private wrestlers, fight an opponent as a service, for money, in a private setting. Typically, the service provider is a professional (ring) wrestler, amateur wrestler, boxer, or bodybuilder. Session wrestlers most commonly are women who cater to a male clientele, but there are also men who provide the service, as well as female clients.

== Overview ==
Some clients partake in private wrestling or boxing matches for the athletic challenge, but for most clients, engaging a private wrestler is a form of fantasy, fulfilling a desire for domination and submission. The sessions usually includes wrestling or fighting in which the provider is stronger or more skilled than their opponent. The fantasy may also have an intellectual or emotional component, with the client trying to (or pretending to try to) take control, but failing. Session wrestling rarely involves sex, or sex acts, though it may include nudity. The sessions also frequently involve muscle worship.

The nature of the session is usually discussed and agreed to in the matchmaking stage. Also, discussed at this stage is the fee, location, rules, duration, and attire. The matches are commonly categorized into several types:

- Fantasy matches involve the acting out of a specific fantasy the client may have. This may include specific holds, attire, locations or roleplaying. Frequently the activities are agreed to in advance. The client typically makes no effort to win the match. Opponents are in this for the sexual overtone aspects of fantasy sessions.
- Semi-competitive matches allow the client to provide some resistance, but not to take enough initiative to try to win the match. The service provider may also "wrestle down" to the level of the client to make the match more interesting. The physical contact and holds are more important than who wins the match. This style of match may also allow the client to test the strength or skills of the provider without the intensity or injury risk of a competitive match.
- Competitive matches are an all-out attempt (though without attempting to injure) to win by both parties. A match of this type usually requires a proper facility with mats and sufficient space (or a ring). Many female session providers avoid these matches due to the relatively high risk of injury.

== Mixed wrestling ==
Mixed wrestling is a private session wrestling match between a woman and a man. Many female bodybuilders take part in mixed wrestling matches. Commonly, these are fantasy matches taking place in apartments or hotel/motel rooms; the male opponent makes little effort to fight back, preferring to let the woman pin him down to enjoy the fantasy of the experience.

== See also ==
- Maledom
- Female submission
- Dominatrix
- Women's boxing
