= Daffney =

American wrestler & actress (1975–2021)

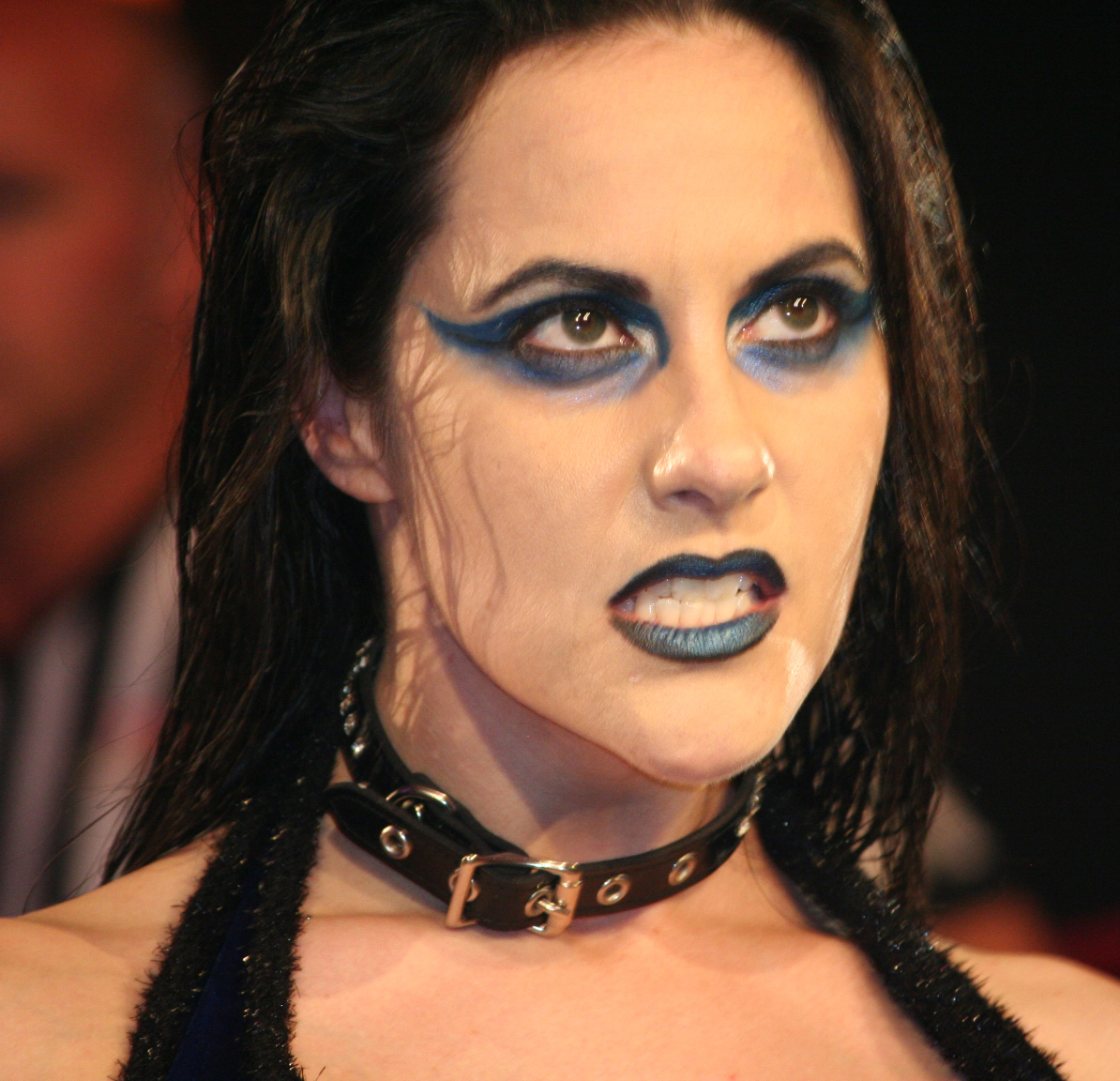
- Daffney in 2010

Personal information
- Born: Shannon Claire Spruill; July 17, 1975 Wiesbaden Army Airfield, West Germany
- Died: September 1, 2021 (aged 46) Norcross, Georgia, U.S.
- Spouse: Rich Ward (m. 1999; div. 2003)

Professional wrestling career
- Ring name(s): Daffney; Daffney Unger; Draculetta; The Governor; Lucy; Lucy Furr; Shark Girl; Shannon
- Billed height: 5 ft 6 in (168 cm)
- Billed weight: 130 lb (59 kg)
- Billed from: 20,000 Leagues Under the Sea; Badstreet, Atlanta, Georgia; Charlotte, North Carolina; Paradise Island; Sybil, Texas; Transylvania; Unknown parts of Alaska
- Trained by: Johnny Slaughter; Leilani Kai; Malia Hosaka; Selina Majors; WCW Power Plant
- Debut: 1999
- Retired: 2011

Shannon Claire Spruill (July 17, 1975 – September 1, 2021), better known by her ring name Daffney, was an American professional wrestler and wrestling manager.

Daffney began her professional wrestling career at World Championship Wrestling (WCW) in 1999. In WCW, she was known for her association with David Flair and Crowbar, and became the second woman (after Madusa) to hold the WCW Cruiserweight Championship. She was released by the promotion one month before it was purchased by WWE in 2001. She subsequently appeared on the independent circuit until she signed with Total Nonstop Action Wrestling (TNA) in 2008. Injuries forced her to retire from wrestling in 2011, but she continued to appear in non-wrestling roles for various promotions until 2018.

== Early life ==
As a military brat, Shannon Claire Spruill was born on July 17, 1975, at the Wiesbaden Army Airfield in Wiesbaden-Erbenheim, West Germany, where her father was stationed. In 1976, her family returned to the U.S. They resided first in Salt Lake City, Utah, then in Savannah, Georgia, and finally on the Scott Air Force Base in St. Clair County, Illinois. They were then relocated to England, where they lived in Oxford for three years before returning to West Germany to live at the Ramstein Air Base in Rhineland-Palatinate until 1987, when her father (by then a lieutenant colonel) retired.

In 1985, Spruill had an uncredited bit part in the film Santa Claus: The Movie. In March 1998, she graduated from Georgia State University with a Bachelor of Arts in film and video production alongside minors in acting and music. She worked in media production before pursuing full-time acting.

== Professional wrestling career ==
=== World Championship Wrestling (1999–2001) ===
In November 1999, Spruill responded to a World Championship Wrestling (WCW) contest looking to acquire new talent and was hired. In WCW, under the ring name Daffney, she portrayed the deranged and besotted girlfriend of David Flair and managed him and Crowbar. One of Daffney's hallmarks was a piercing scream when she was lurking at ringside. The gimmick was based in part on Juliette Lewis' character in the film Natural Born Killers. Spruill also cited Harley Quinn as the original inspiration for the character. Spruill's first appearance was on the December 6 episode of Nitro, when she was shown sitting on her bed and chanting Flair's name.

On May 8, 2000, Daffney was appointed by Vince Russo to wrestle Miss Elizabeth in her first wrestling match. On May 15, Daffney and Crowbar defeated WCW World Cruiserweight Champion Chris Candido and his girlfriend Tammy Lynn Sytch in a mixed tag team match where Candido's cruiserweight title was on the line. Daffney scored the pin on Tammy to make her and Crowbar the co-champions. The following week on the May 22 episode of Nitro, Crowbar and Daffney faced one another to determine the undisputed World Cruiserweight Champion. Crowbar held back during the match, but still dominated the smaller Daffney. After Candido entered the ring and hit Crowbar with a reverse piledriver, Spruill inadvertently pinned him while trying to revive him and thus became the second woman ever to hold the Cruiserweight Championship. Her reign lasted until June 7 when Lieutenant Loco pinned Disco Inferno in a three-way title defense while Daffney was hurt following interference from Miss Hancock. Daffney went on to feud with Hancock, who had stolen the affections of Flair. Daffney defeated Hancock in the promotion's first ever Wedding Gown match after Hancock removed her own dress. Daffney then became solely the valet for Crowbar. She had a brief feud with Shane Douglas's valet, Torrie Wilson, but was sporadically used as a wrestler.

Daffney's gimmicks included frequently changing hair color, t-shirts printed with bizarre slogans, and her loud screams, the latter which was the suggestion of head WCW writer Ed Ferrara. She was released by WCW on February 2, 2001, due to budget cutbacks. WCW itself was purchased by its rival, the World Wrestling Federation, a month later.

=== Independent circuit (2001–2013) ===
After her release from WCW, Spruill opted to continue wrestling, attending Dusty Rhodes' Turnbuckle Championship Wrestling training camp in Kennesaw, Georgia, for eight months. She also worked for Xtreme Pro Wrestling in 2003 as Lucy, the manager of Vic Grimes. She also appeared in Ring of Honor, where she debuted on April 26, 2003, as Lucy, the valet of the Second City Saints. In July 2003, Spruill was signed to a developmental deal by World Wrestling Entertainment. She worked in Ohio Valley Wrestling as the manager of Aaron Stevens until she was released on December 17 of the same year. Spruill decided to retire from professional wrestling. Intending to focus on her acting career, she sold her wrestling boots to her then-roommate, Mickie James. While retired, Spruill worked as a personal trainer.

In June 2005, she posed for a website owned and operated by Francine and Missy Hyatt. In February 2006, Spruill returned to the independent circuit. Spruill debuted in Women's Extreme Wrestling on April 6 under the ring name Lucy Furr ("Lucifer"), acting as a lumberjill in a match between Amy Lee and Tai Killer Weed. On June 2 in Irondale, Alabama, Spruill faced El Mexicano for the NWA Wrestle Birmingham Junior Heavyweight Championship. With the help of her manager, Robert Fuller (who referred to Spruill as his "Million Dollar Baby"), Spruill defeated El Mexicano to win her third wrestling title. In February 2007, she began making appearances with Georgia Wrestling Promotions both as a manager and a referee.

In April 2007, Spruill debuted as Daffney for Shimmer Women Athletes. She conducted an interview where she revealed her goal was to return to what she did from the beginning of her career and that was to manage. Later that evening she appeared as the manager of the wrestler MsChif. In April 2008 she began wrestling as her Shark Girl character. However, she returned to wrestling as Daffney after only a couple of months. On November 8, 2009, Daffney teamed with Rachel Summerlyn against the International Home Wrecking Crew at Volume 27, only to turn villainous by abandoning Summerlyn during the match, causing a loss to the IHWC. Later in the night on Volume 28, Daffney got disqualified in a match with Summerlyn, after she did not release an illegal hold off her opponent. On April 11, 2010, at the tapings of Volume 31, the evil Daffney defeated Summerlyn in a No Disqualification match.

On June 27, 2010, Daffney won her only Women's Championship defeating Rachel Summerlyn in the 1st round of Anarchy Championship Wrestling's 2010 American Joshi Queen of Queens Tournament. She lost the title in the 2nd round to Jessica James. On April 6, 2013, Daffney returned to Shimmer Women Athletes at the promotion's first ever internet pay-per-view, Volume 53, where she appeared as the manager of Regeneration X (Allison Danger and Leva Bates).

=== Total Nonstop Action Wrestling (2002–2003, 2008–2011) ===
==== Early appearances (2002–2003, 2008) ====
She made several appearances for the fledgling Total Nonstop Action Wrestling promotion from 2002 to 2003 as Shannon and Shark Girl (valet of Shark Boy).

On the June 5, 2008, episode of TNA Impact!, she appeared as a planted fan in the audience along with fellow wrestlers Amber O'Neal and Becky Bayless. The three women volunteered to wrestle Awesome Kong in a $25,000 Challenge. Daffney was selected and subsequently defeated by Kong.

==== The Governor (2008–2009) ====
In December 2008, Spruill portrayed Alaska governor Sarah Palin in skits involving the Beautiful People. On the January 15, 2009, episode of Impact!, it was revealed by Taylor Wilde and Roxxi that "Sarah Palin" was indeed fake, and it had all been a big joke by Roxxi and Taylor to get revenge on The Beautiful People. The next week she was seen in an interview with Lauren, where they made fun of the Beautiful People. The Beautiful People then proceeded to viciously attack "The Governor" before being pulled away by Cute Kip as Spruill lay injured. On the February 5, 2009, episode of Impact!, she made her return by attacking the Beautiful People, this time complete with entrance video and theme. She made her PPV debut at Destination X in a winning effort when she teamed with Roxxi and Wilde to defeat The Beautiful People and Madison Rayne.

==== Daffney and alliance with Dr. Stevie (2009–2010) ====
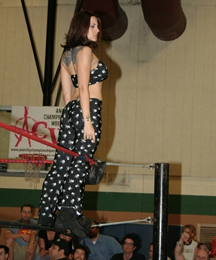
Daffney in 2009

As a result of having her hair cut by the Beautiful People on the March 19 episode of Impact!, Spruill transformed into her old Daffney ring name and gimmick on the April 2 episode of Impact!, when she appeared in on-screen psychiatrist Dr. Stevie's office for a therapy session. On the April 16 episode of Impact!, she teamed with Stevie's other patient Abyss to defeat the duo of ODB and Cody Deaner in a mixed tag team match. She competed in the Queen of the Cage match at Lockdown against ODB, Madison Rayne and Sojournor Bolt, but failed to win the match. On the May 14 episode of Impact!, Daffney turned heel by assaulting Taylor Wilde, because she did not save her when The Beautiful People cut her hair. At Sacrifice Wilde defeated Daffney, who had Abyss and Dr. Stevie in her corner, in the first ever Monster's Ball match. After she and Dr. Stevie began associating themselves with the returning Raven, Daffney defeated Wilde with their help in a rematch on the June 4 episode of Impact with her swinging fisherman suplex named the Lobotomy. The following week she assaulted Wilde backstage after provoking her by attacking her on-screen best friend, backstage interviewer Lauren, earlier on the same night. Daffney and Raven were defeated by Abyss and Taylor Wilde at Slammiversary in a Monster's Ball mixed tag match. During the match Wilde slammed Daffney onto a pile of thumbtacks. The following Thursday on Impact!, she and Wilde faced off in the first ever "Match of 10,000 Tacks", which she lost.

At Bound for Glory, she interfered in a Monster's Ball match between Abyss and Mick Foley, who had assigned Abyss' rival and Daffney's associate Dr. Stevie as the special guest referee of the match. During the match, Abyss chokeslammed Daffney from the ring apron through a barbed wire board, although reports indicated she had suffered a broken arm, it was later reported to be inaccurate although she had instead suffered a concussion. On the November 12 episode of Impact!, Raven once again returned to TNA to reform the group of himself, Dr. Stevie and Daffney.

==== Singles competition (2010–2011) ====
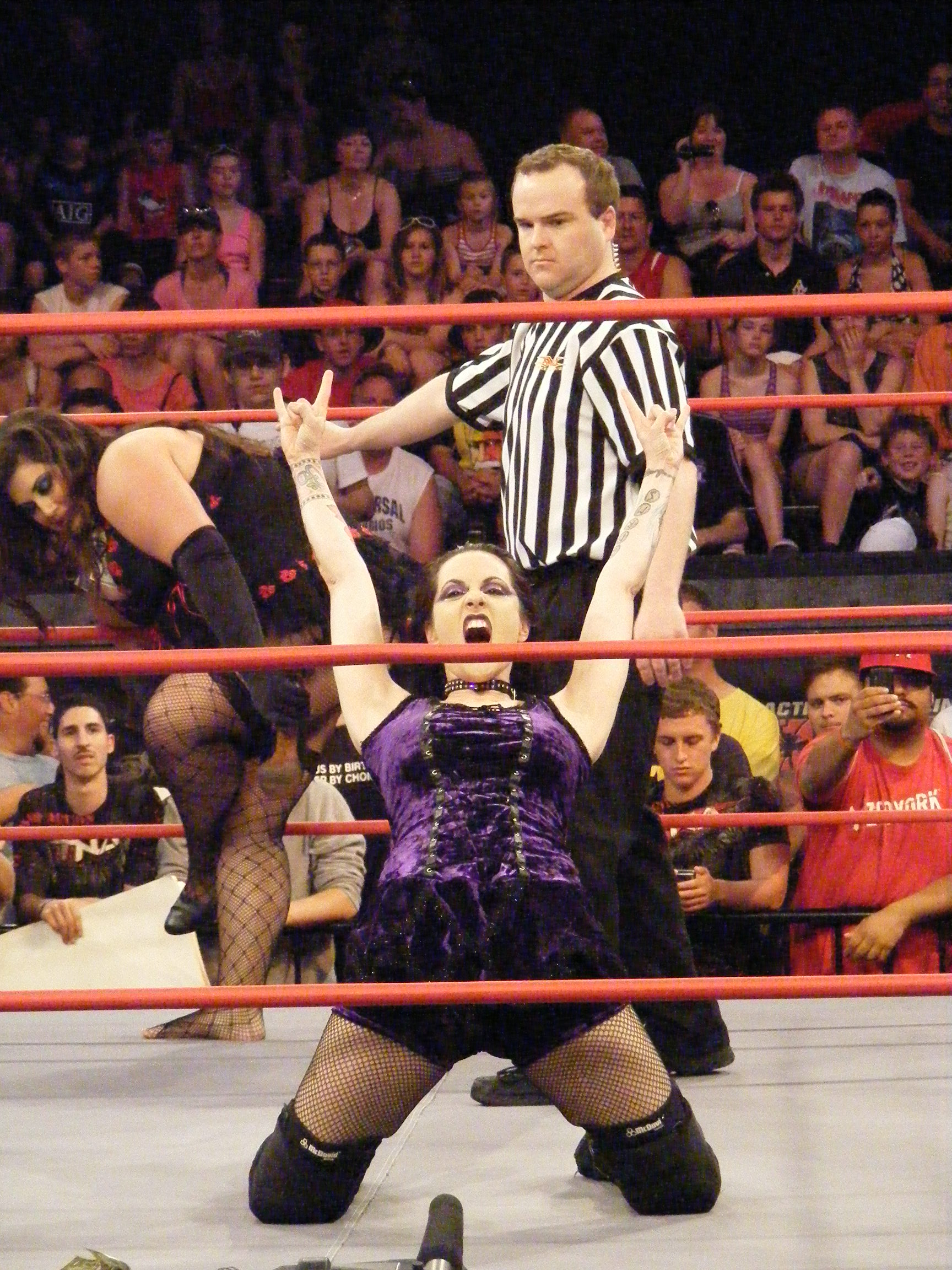
Daffney in 2010

Daffney spent the next couple of months mainly managing Stevie and Raven, before making her in-ring return on the February 18, 2010, episode of Impact!, losing to the TNA Women's Knockout Champion Tara via disqualification, after hitting her with a toolbox. After the match, Daffney continued her assault, before being dragged away by Dr. Stevie. The following week on Impact! she annihilated ODB in similar fashion as it was noted that she had her eye set on the title. On the March 8 episode of Impact!, Daffney cost Tara and her tag team partner Angelina Love the Knockouts Tag Team Championship by hitting her with the Women's Knockout Championship belt during a match for the vacant titles. At Destination X Daffney failed in her attempt to win the Knockout Championship from Tara, but managed to steal her spider Poison from her after the match. The following day on Impact! Daffney used distraction from Poison to pin Tara in an eight wrestler tag team match to earn her a First Blood match for the Women's Knockout Championship the following week. The following week Tara defeated Daffney in a First Blood match after hitting her with a toolbox. The following week Daffney was one of the four winners in an eight knockout Lockbox match, contested for four keys to four boxes containing prizes. During the contest Tara, one of the three other winners, won back Poison, while Daffney came up empty handed and was forced to strip down, but before she could she was attacked by Lacey Von Erich. The attack resulted in a match on the April 19 episode of Impact!, where Daffney, now seemingly a face, and a partner of her choice, ODB, unsuccessfully challenged Von Erich and Velvet Sky for the TNA Knockouts Tag Team Championship. At the following day's Impact! tapings, Daffney was injured in a dark match against Miss Betsy in her tryout match and was taken to a hospital, where she was diagnosed with a deeply bruised sternum, a severe stinger, and a concussion.

On May 26 it was announced that Spruill had been cleared to return to wrestling. She made her return at the June 14 tapings of Xplosion, wrestling once again as a heel and defeating Taylor Wilde with the help of a chain, only to have the referee of the match catch her afterwards, leading to Wilde defeating her after a restart. On the December 9 episode of Impact!, Daffney teamed with Sarita in a first-round match of a tournament for the vacant TNA Knockouts Tag Team Championship, where they were defeated by the Beautiful People (Angelina Love and Velvet Sky). This marked Daffney's final appearance for TNA, as on March 15, 2011, her contract with the promotion expired and was not renewed. Spruill announced that she had filed a workers' compensation claim against TNA for injuries suffered while wrestling for the promotion, believing she had been put in an unsafe working environment. Spruill later also claimed she did not believe she could ever wrestle again due to the accumulated injuries she had suffered during her career. The lawsuit was settled out of court on March 8, 2013.

=== Wrestlicious (2009–2010) ===
In early 2009 Spruill took part in the first season tapings of Wrestlicious, which started airing in March 2010, using the character of Draculetta. She debuted on March 17 in the main event of the third episode of Takedown, teaming with White Magic in a tag team match, where they lost via disqualification to the team of Lacey Von Erich and Amber Lively.

=== Retirement appearances (2011–2018) ===
Despite retiring in 2011, in July 2012, she began working as hostess of the new Shine Wrestling promotion. She held the position until May 2013, when she returned to the role of a manager. Daffney turned heel in July 2015, when she became the manager of the Iron Maidens, sending them to attack various tag teams during matches. She also appeared in 2018 in Ring of Honor after a Women of Honor World Championship tournament final between Sumie Sakai and Kelly Klein, congratulating Sakai on her victory.

In 2018, Daffney made what would be her only non-archival WWE appearance when she was in the crowd and acknowledged by Mick Foley during his WWE Network stand-up special Twenty Years of Hell held at Mr. Smalls Theater in Millvale, Pennsylvania, just outside of Pittsburgh, which was taped on the 20th anniversary of the infamous Hell in a Cell match that took place in Pittsburgh at the Civic Arena.

== Personal life ==
Spruill was married to guitarist Rich Ward from 1999 until divorcing in 2003. After their divorce, she dated fellow wrestler CM Punk. Spruill dated independent wrestler Kaleb Konley from 2006 until 2010. She had a close relationship with wrestler Jamie Lynn Senegal, whom she considered her daughter.

On July 19, 2011, Spruill was arrested for driving under the influence with property damage in Hillsborough County, Florida. She pled guilty to the charges, for which she was sentenced to one year of probation and fined $1,580.

In 2012, Spruill was involved in a serious car accident in Florida, and credited her seat belt with saving her life.

=== Health ===
In 2003, Spruill was diagnosed with bipolar disorder.

Spruill had surgery in January 2017 to fuse her C-5 and C-6 vertebrae to fix an extrusion that was pressing upon her spinal column. She subsequently wrote that neck surgery was a "rite of passage" for professional wrestlers.

Towards the end of her life, Spruill became vocal about concussions in the professional wrestling industry. In the 2017 book Sisterhood of the Squared Circle: The History and Rise of Women's Wrestling, she was quoted as saying concussions had ended her wrestling career and advised other wrestlers to rest after taking a blow to the head. She said the effects the concussions had on her day-to-day life were obvious, such as having to cover windows with blankets because bright lights gave her headaches. In a live video she streamed on the day she died, Spruill said, "I want the future generations to know. Don't do stupid shit like me."

== Death ==
On September 1, 2021, Spruill livestreamed on Instagram and read a suicide note whilst holding what appeared to be a pistol and requesting that her brain be donated for chronic traumatic encephalopathy (CTE) testing. Concerned fans took to social media to support her, and law enforcement was dispatched to her previous known addresses until her family was able to provide her updated address in Norcross, Georgia. She was found dead at her home at the age of 46. At the request of her family, her death was announced the following day by wrestler Lexie Fyfe. An official for the Gwinnett County Medical Examiner's office also confirmed her death, but did not disclose the cause. A Gwinnett County Police Department report later revealed that she had died of a gunshot wound to the chest, and her autopsy results confirmed that the gunshot was self-inflicted. Her brain was subsequently taken to Boston University CTE Center and Brain Bank for analysis, which found evidence of CTE. Her brain was the first female brain to be studied by the institution.

In the days following her death, figures within professional wrestling expressed their condolences and discussed the topic of mental health. USA Today wrote that her death "intensified concerns" within the business, especially among female performers, noting the suicides of wrestlers Ashley Massaro and Hana Kimura in the preceding two years. Mick Foley and Kane posted the suicide hotline's phone number on Twitter, while Paige used the hashtag #MentalHealthMatters and Spruill's ex-boyfriend CM Punk wrote, "Ask for help. Mental, physical, spiritual, emotional. Take care of each other." Mike Johnson of Pro Wrestling Insider encouraged industry leaders to make permanent changes regarding mental health care, comparing it to WWE instituting its Wellness Policy after the 2005 death of Eddie Guerrero. While WWE does provide psychological and psychiatric services for contracted performers, Cheerleader Melissa pushed for other promotions to provide services for their wrestlers.

Spruill was cremated and a celebration of life was held in her memory. Among the attendees were family, friends, and professional wrestlers such as Jamie Senegal, Leva Bates, Mia Yim, Courtney Rush, Mickie James, Nick Aldis, Allysin Kay, Marti Belle, and Kimber Lee. Awesome Kong dedicated her induction into the Impact Hall of Fame to Spruill on September 18. The following month, Impact dedicated the Monster's Ball match at Knockouts Knockdown to Spruill.

Spruill's life and death were chronicled in a 2025 episode of Dark Side of the Ring.

== Filmography ==
- Santa Claus: The Movie (1985) – Bratty Kid at Ballet Class (uncredited)
- I Surrender All (2001) – Gina
- The Gorda (2014) – The Barracuda

== Championships and accomplishments ==
- Anarchy Championship Wrestling
  - ACW American Joshi Championship (1 time)
- Alabama Pro Wrestling Hall of Fame
  - Class of 2018
- Great Championship Wrestling
  - GCW Women's Championship (1 time)
- NWA Wrestle Birmingham
  - NWA Wrestle Birmingham Junior Heavyweight Championship (1 time)
- Pro Wrestling Illustrated
  - Ranked No. 18 of the top 50 female singles wrestlers in the PWI Female 50 in 2009
- World Championship Wrestling
  - WCW Cruiserweight Championship (1 time)

== See also ==
- List of premature professional wrestling deaths
