= Sirelda =

Canadian professional wrestler (born 1976)

Personal information
- Born: Jaime Dauncey; November 20, 1976 (age 49) Windsor, Ontario, Canada

Professional wrestling career
- Ring name(s): Butch; Jaime D Klondyke; Sirelda
- Billed height: 5 ft 10 in (178 cm)
- Billed weight: 200 lb (91 kg)
- Billed from: Windsor, Ontario, Canada
- Trained by: Scott D'Amore; Tyson Dux
- Debut: 2004
- Retired: 2017

Jaime Dauncey is a Canadian retired professional wrestler, best known for her appearances with NWA Total Nonstop Action in 2006 under the ring name Sirelda and on the independent circuit as Jaime D.

== Professional wrestling career ==
=== Early career (2004–2006) ===
Dauncey trained under Scott D'Amore and Tyson Dux at the Can-Am Wrestling School in 2002. She debuted in 2004 in D'Amore's Border City Wrestling under the ring name Jamie D.

=== Total Nonstop Action (2006) ===
On October 16, 2004 in Atlanta, Georgia, Dauncey took part in the "Gut Check Challenge", a talent recruitment event organized by Total Nonstop Action Wrestling (TNA). The event saw entrants rated on the basis of their performance in five categories: "back bump", "mat techniques", "ring interviews", "running the ropes" and "squat challenge". The female and male events were won by Dauncey and Jon Bolen respectively, with Dauncey and Bolen rewarded with a $4,000 cash prize and a subsequent appearance on TNA programming. In 2005, Dauncey attended the TNA pay-per-view Bound For Glory, and TNA announced that she had been signed to a developmental deal.

Dauncey returned to TNA programming on June 18, 2006 at Slammiversary, helping A.J. Styles and Christopher Daniels defeat America's Most Wanted (AMW) for the NWA World Tag Team Championship by chokeslamming and then carrying away Gail Kim, AMW's manager and a perennial distraction to their opponents. She continued in her role as "neutralizer" on the subsequent episode of Impact!, preventing Simon Diamond from interfering in a match between Styles and Daniels and The Diamonds in the Rough. During this time she was not referred to by name, with Jim Cornette referring to her as "that big Amazon woman". Her name was later revealed to be Sirelda during a video package on TNA's website. At Victory Road, Sirelda, Styles and Daniels defeated AMW and Kim in a six-person tag team match to retain the NWA World Tag Team Championship. After losing to Kim in a singles bout at Hard Justice, Dauncey left the promotion. She returned two months later at Bound for Glory as an entrant in the "Kevin Nash Open Invitational X Division Gauntlet Battle Royal" where she was quickly eliminated by A-1 after a brief flurry of offense.

=== Independent circuit (2006–2017) ===
In early 2007, Dauncey went on a tour of Japan. On August 5, 2007 in Tokyo, Japan, Dauncey defeated Nanae Takahashi to win the AWA Japan Women's Championship. Dauncey also competed in Women's Extreme Wrestling as Klondyke.

In 2009, Dauncey met Superstar Billy Graham at the Cauliflower Alley Club reunion and enlisted him to help rejuvenate her wrestling career. In September of that year, she appeared in the independent film Rex Cairo.

After Graham's unsuccessful attempts to rejuvenate her career, Dauncey entered Team 3D Academy of Professional Wrestling in order to get a new and fresh start on her professional wrestling career again. This was also a failure.

On April 29, 2013, Dauncey made her debut for Japanese promotion World Woman Pro-Wrestling Diana, unsuccessfully challenging Kyoko Inoue for the WWWD Championship in a steel cage match at the promotion's second anniversary event.

Between 2015-2017, Dauncey performed for Afa Anoa'i's World Xtreme Wrestling in Florida. Dauncey held the WXW Women's Championship, the WXW Hardcore Championship, and feuded with Mercedes Martinez.

In 2017, Dauncey decided to retire from professional wrestling.

== Championships and accomplishments ==
- Great Canadian Wrestling
  - GCW W.I.L.D Championship (1 time)
- Pro Wrestling Illustrated
  - Ranked No. 41 of the top 50 female wrestlers in the PWI Female 50 in 2008
- Pro Wrestling Xtreme
  - PWX X-Division Championship (1 time)
- Pro Wrestling Zero1-Max
  - AWA Japan Women's Championship (1 time)
- Total Nonstop Action Wrestling
  - TNA Gut Check winner
- World Xtreme Wrestling
  - WXW Women's Championship (1 time)
  - WXW Hardcore Championship (1 time)
