= Solo Darling =

American professional wrestler

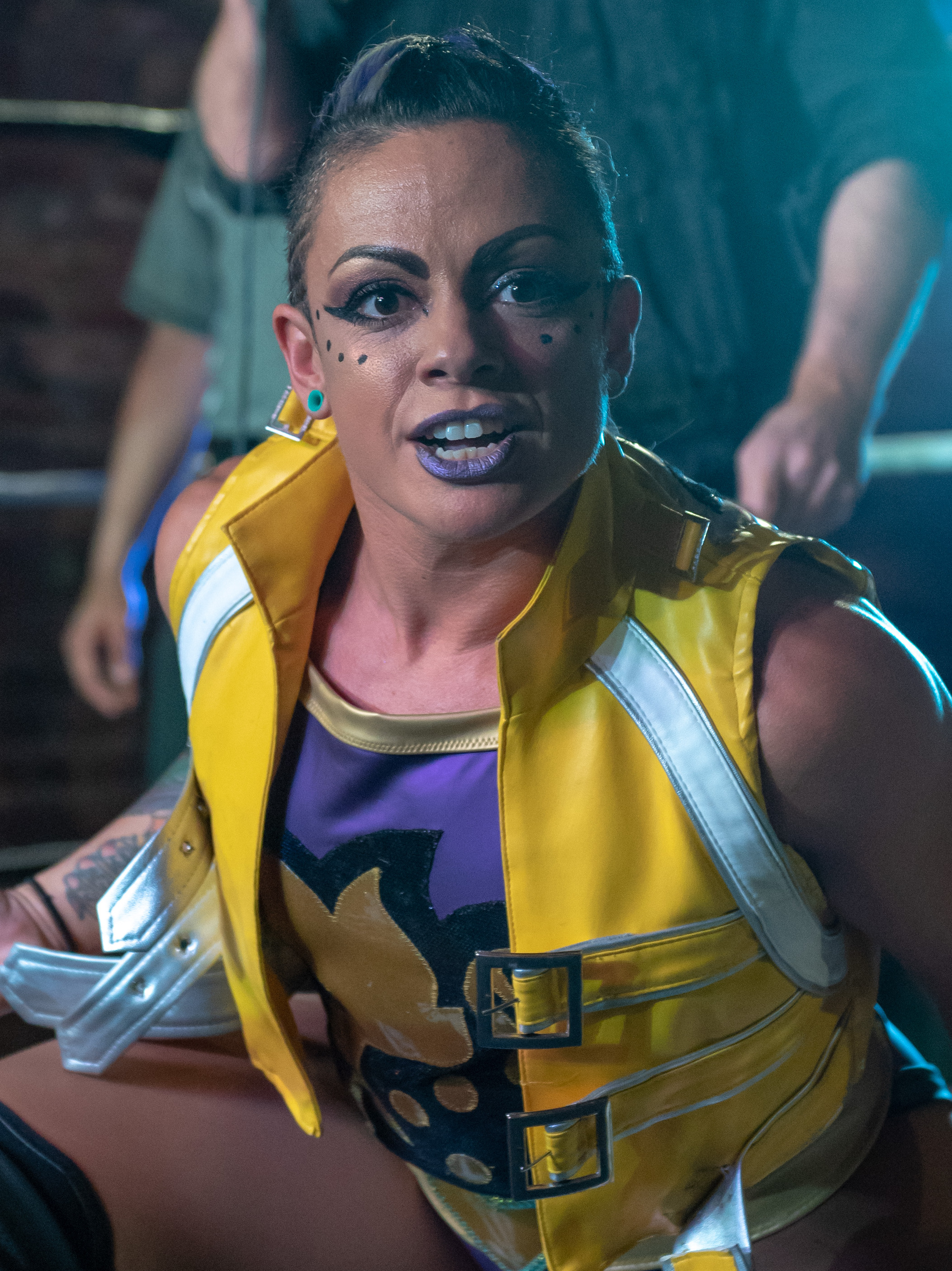
- Solo Darling in 2019

Personal information
- Born: February 19, 1987 (age 39) Bronx, New York City, U.S.

Professional wrestling career
- Ring names: Christie Belle Smothers; Woodland Warrior; Solo Darling
- Billed height: 5 ft 3 in (160 cm)
- Billed weight: 130 lb (59 kg)
- Trained by: Mike Quackenbush; Nick Dinsmore; Al Snow; Rip Rogers
- Debut: 2011
- Retired: 2021

Christina Solomita (born February 19, 1987), better known by her ring name Solo Darling, is an American retired professional wrestler best known for her time with various promotions such as Game Changer Wrestling and Shimmer Women Athletes.

== Professional wrestling career ==
=== Independent circuit (2009–2021) ===
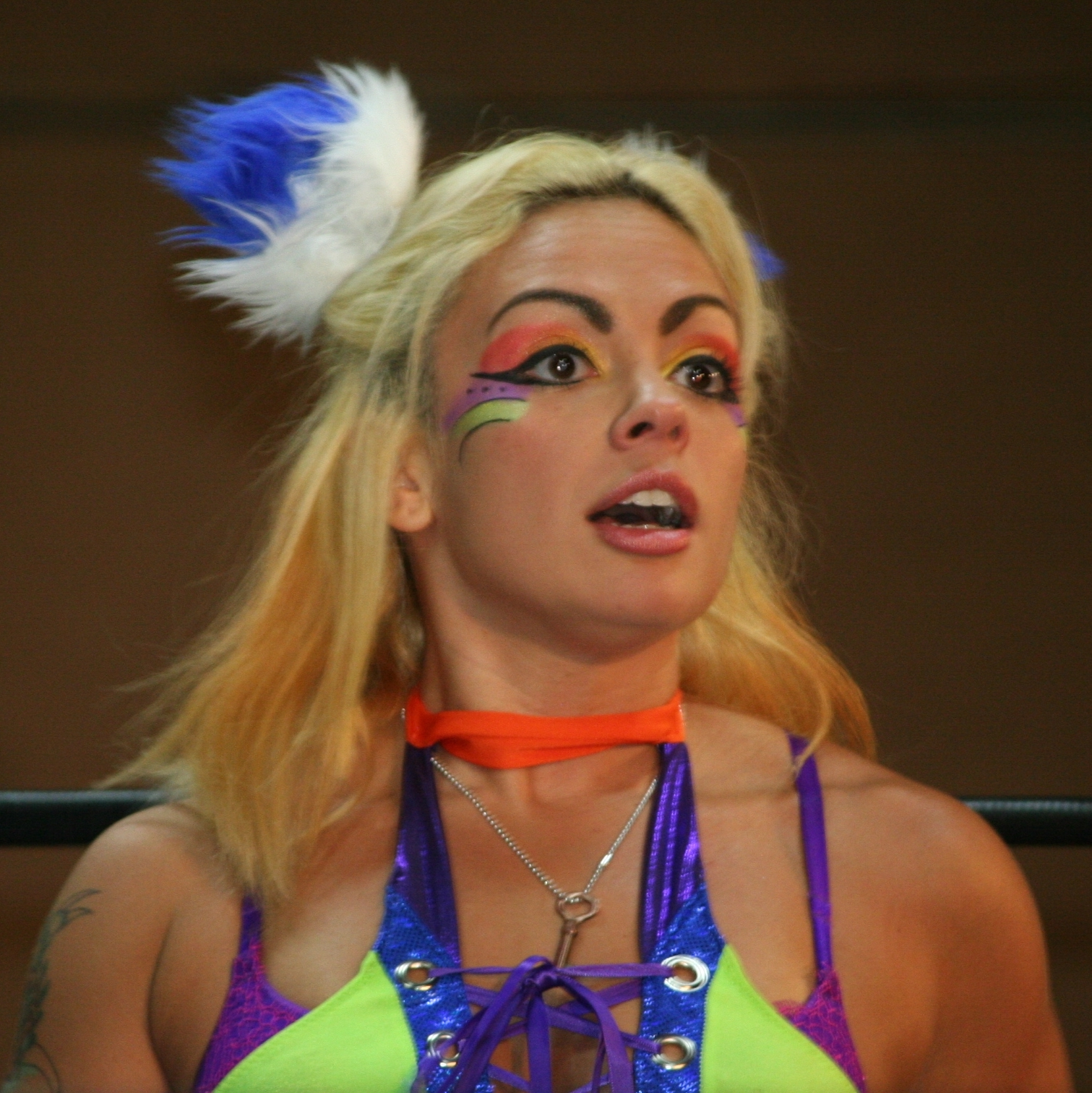
Darling in 2013

Darling made her professional wrestling debut at OVW TV #615 on June 1, 2011, in a dark match, losing to Lady JoJo. At Game Changer Wrestling's Joey Janela's Spring Break 4 from October 10, 2020, she participated in a 30-person battle royal where she competed against various wrestlers such as the winner Nate Webb, Shark Boy, JTG, Flash Flanagan and Marko Stunt. She competed in a knockout battle royal at Impact #774 episode of Impact Wrestling, where she collided with other popular wrestlers such as Jordynne Grace, Tessa Blanchard, Scarlett Bordeaux and Madison Rayne.

=== Chikara (2016–2020) ===
She is best known for her time with Chikara, for which she made her debut at National Pro Wrestling Day 2016 on February 6, 2016, in a losing effort against Heidi Lovelace. She participated in the Chikara King of Trios 2016 Tournament, where she teamed up with Candice LeRae and Crazy Mary Dobson as Team Shimmer to fall short to Team Original Divas Revolution (Jazz, Mickie James and Victoria) in a first-round match. At CHIKARA Every Man For Himself on December 22, 2016, Darling participated in a 34-person infinite gauntlet match where she competed against wrestlers such as the winner Dasher Hatfield, Hallowicked and Ophidian. At CHIKARA The Lodger on July 8, 2017, she teamed up with Travis Huckabee as The Rumblebees to defeat Cornelius Crummels and Sonny Defarge score (2–1) in a 2-out-of-3-falls match for the Chikara Campeonatos de Parejas. They lost the titles the same night to Los Ice Creams (El Hijo del Ice Cream and Ice Cream Jr.) in a 2-out-of-3-falls match as well. At CHIKARA Tug Of War on November 9, 2019, Darling teamed up with her The Bird and the Bee long time tag team partner Willow Nightingale to defeat FIST (Tony Deppen and Travis Huckabee) to win the Chikara Campeonatos de Parejas in a 2-out-of-3-falls match, score (2–1). They held the titles until June 24, 2020, when Chikara closed. She unsuccessfully competed two times for the Chikara Grand Championship, first time against Juan Francisco De Coronado at CHIKARA Egg Monsters From Mars on July 28, 2018, and second time against Dasher Hatfield who was an interim champion replacing Mark Angelosetti at Young Lions Cup XV – 2nd Stage on March 16, 2019.

=== Shine Wrestling (2013–2015) ===
Darling wrestled her first match for Shine Wrestling on April 19, 2013, at Shine 9, where she competed against Rhea O'Reilly and Brittney Savage in a three-way match. At Shine 10 on May 24, 2013, she teamed up with Heidi Lovelace and Luscious Latasha, falling short to Jessie Belle, Sassy Stephie and Sojournor Bolt in a Six-woman tag team match. At Shine 12 on August 23, 2013, she teamed up with Nikki Roxx as part of the Daffney's All Star Squad stable to defeat The West Coast Connection (Su Yung and Tracy Taylor). At Shine 13 on September 27, 2013, Darling faced Mercedes Martinez in a losing effort. She participated in a Shine Tag Team Championship tournament, where she teamed up with Heidi Lovelace on January 24, 2014, at Shine 17 as The Buddy System to defeat Brandi Wine and Malia Hosaka. They lost the semi-final match to Made in Sin (Allysin Kay and Taylor Made) the same night.

=== Beyond Wrestling (2018–2021) ===
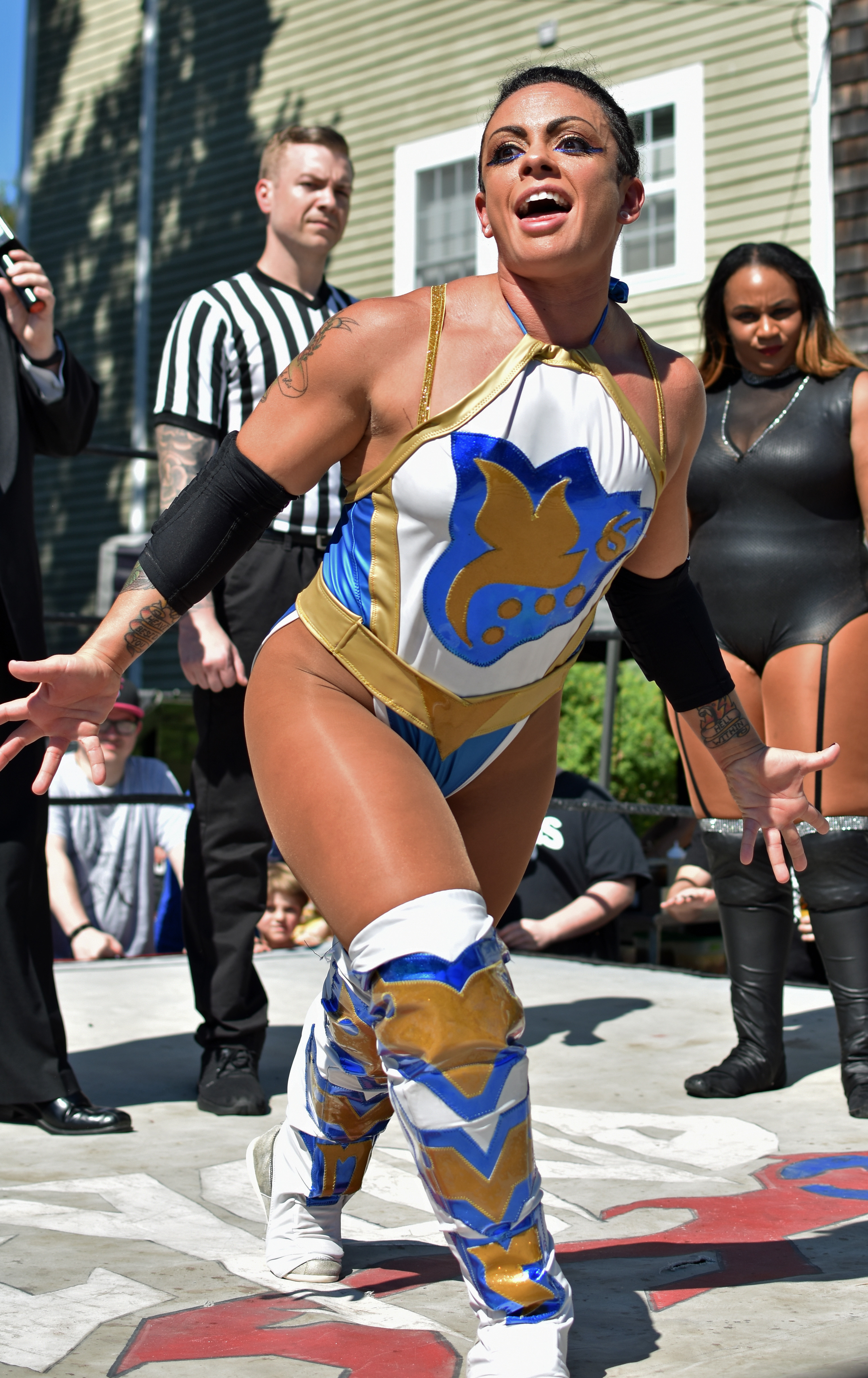
Darling in 2018

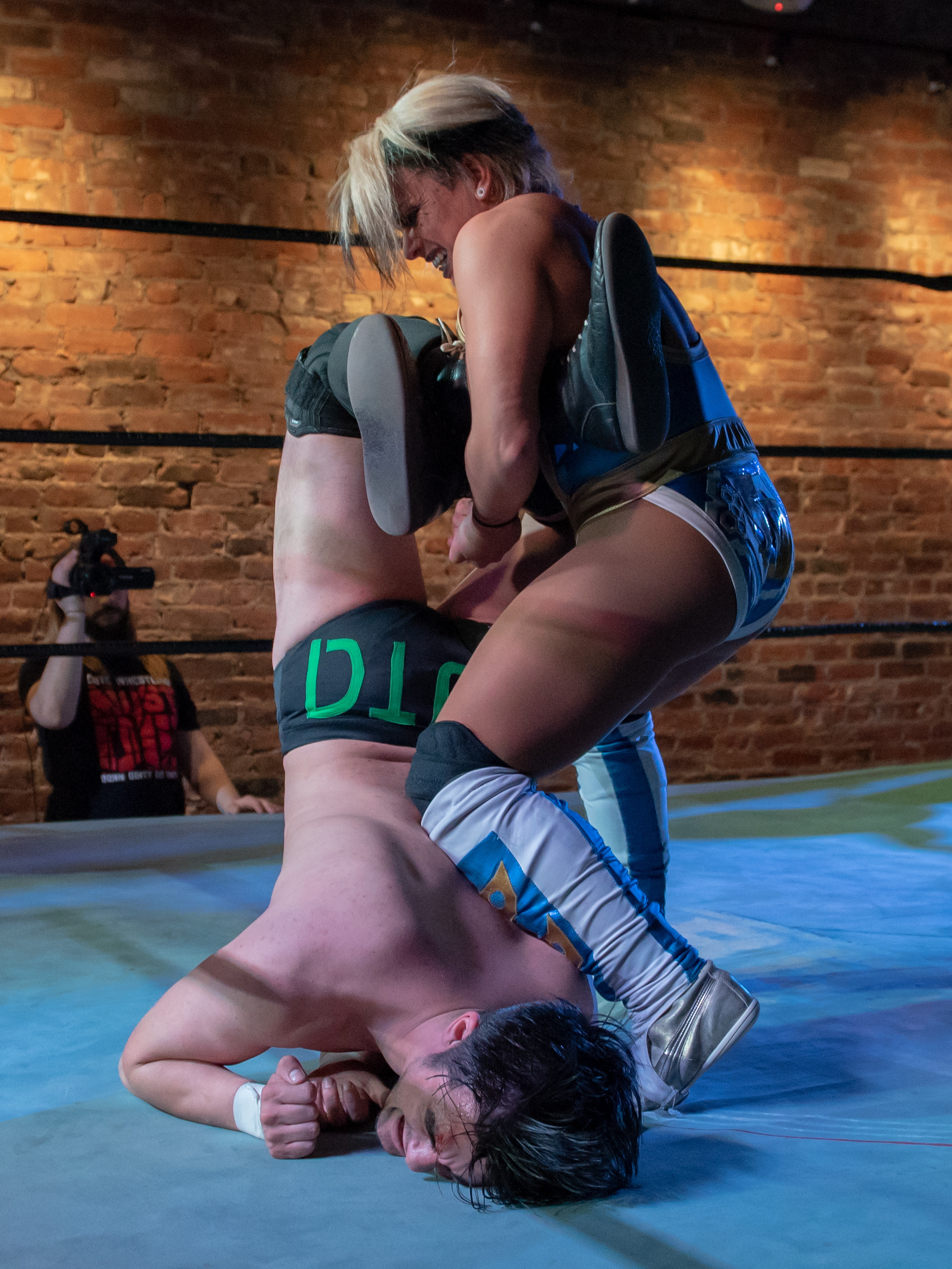
Darling places Wheeler Yuta in the SharpStinger (a Rivera cloverleaf) during a match for Beyond Wrestling

Darling spent almost three years with Beyond Wrestling. She wrestled her last match at Beyond Project Reality on May 6, 2021, where she fell short to Aaron Rourke as a result of a singles competition. She has been on hiatus from professional wrestling ever since.

== Personal life ==
Solomita identifies herself as pansexual. She came out in late 2020 during pride month.

== Championships and accomplishments ==
- Beyond Wrestling
  - Feast Championship Wrestling Championship (1 time, final)
- Chikara
  - Chikara Campeonatos de Parejas (2 times, final) – with Travis Huckabee and Willow Nightingale
- Pro Wrestling Illustrated
  - Ranked No. 72 of the top 100 female singles wrestlers in the PWI Women's 100 in 2020
- Ring Warriors
  - Battling Bombshells Tag Team Championship (1 time) – with Brittney Savage
- Women's Wrestling Revolution
  - Tournament for Tomorrow (2018) – with Willow Nightingale
- World Xtreme Wrestling
  - WXW Women's Championship (1 time)
