= Sage Beckett =

American wrestler (born 1985)

Personal information
- Born: MaryKate Duignan Glidewell; January 17, 1985 (age 41) Ruskin, Florida, U.S.

Professional wrestling career
- Ring name(s): Andréa; Andrea Mother; Betsy Ruth; Miss Betsy; Rosie Lottalove; Sage Beckett; Sage Miller; Sister Ophelia
- Billed height: 5 ft 10.5 in (1.79 m)
- Billed weight: 316 lb (143 kg); 190 lb (86 kg)
- Billed from: Cooperstown, New York; Las Vegas, Nevada; Tampa, Florida
- Trained by: Bubba Ray Dudley; D-Von Dudley
- Debut: 2007
- Retired: 2018

MaryKate Duignan Glidewell (born January 17, 1985) is an American retired professional wrestler. She is known for her work in WWE, where she performed under the ring name Sage Beckett at their developmental territory NXT. She is also known for working for Total Nonstop Action Wrestling under the ring name Rosie Lottalove. She previously retired on June 24, 2012, due to injuries before resuming her career in October 2014 after losing nearly 130 pounds.

== Professional wrestling career ==
=== Early Career (2007–2010) ===
Glidewell trained under tag team Team 3D at their Team 3D Academy of Professional Wrestling and Sports Entertainment in Kissimmee, Florida. She made her professional wrestling debut in 2007 under the ring name Betsy Ruth. As part of her gimmick, Ruth was billed as the great-granddaughter of Major League Baseball Hall of Famer Babe Ruth and would wear attire involving pinstripes like the New York Yankees and face paint, similar to the Baseball Furies gang from the film The Warriors. She signed with World Xtreme Wrestling (WXW) in late 2008. Making her debut as Betsy Ruth, she took part in the Women's Elite 8 Tournament in 2008, but lost to eventual tournament winner Mercedes Martinez. In the 2009 tournament, Ruth defeated Josie in the first round, Kimberly in the semifinals, and Sarona Snuka in the finals to win the Elite 8 Tournament. At the January 9, 2010 edition of WXW, Ruth faced Kimberly to determine the next Women's Champion but was unsuccessful in winning the title.

Glidewell took part in the first season tapings of Wrestlicious, performing under the ring name Sister Ophelia as the manager of the Naughty Girls (Charity, Faith, and Hope). The team made their debut on the fifth episode, where Faith and Hope were defeated by Paige Webb and Charlotte in a tag team match.

=== Total Nonstop Action Wrestling (2010, 2015) ===
On April 20, 2010, Glidewell wrestled a tryout dark match for Total Nonstop Action Wrestling (TNA) under the ring name Miss Betsy, during which she seriously injured her opponent, Daffney. On May 12, it was announced Duignan had signed a deal with TNA. On the June 3 edition of Impact! Duignan made her debut as a face, using the ring name Rosie Lottalove and losing to Roxxi after refusing to take advantage of an interference from the Knockouts Champion Madison Rayne. Afterward, Lottalove knocked out Rayne and claimed that she would take her down and The Beautiful People altogether. However, after wrestling only two more matches for TNA, one a non-televised match and the other on Xplosion, Lottalove's profile was removed from the company's official website on August 19, 2010, confirming her departure from TNA.

Five years later, Glidewell appeared at the taping for the TNA pay-per-view Knockouts Knockdown 3 on February 14, 2015, where she lost to Awesome Kong.

=== Japan and retirement (2011–2012) ===
On May 15, 2011, Glidewell made her debut for Japanese promotion World Woman Pro-Wrestling Diana, working under the ring name Andrea Mother and defeated Kyoko Inoue in the main event. On July 10, she teamed with Aja Kong to defeat Inoue and Kaoru Ito in a tag team match. Mother and Kong's partnership also carried over to the Happy Hour promotion, where they were defeated by Inoue and Sareee on September 4. On September 10, Inoue defeated Mother in a rematch.

On June 24, 2012, Glidewell announced on her Twitter account that she would retire due to injuries.

=== Return and independent circuit (2014–2016) ===
In October 2014, Glidewell, now 127 pounds lighter, made her return to professional wrestling under the ring name Andréa. Glidewell would also become a mainstay in the female wrestling promotion, SHINE.

=== WWE NXT (2017–2018) ===
In June 2015, Glidewell took part in a WWE tryout camp. She competed in the October 22 taping of NXT, losing to Emma. On January 4, 2017, WWE officially announced that Glidewell had signed with the company and would be reporting to the WWE Performance Center. Beginning in April, Gildwell appeared at NXT live events as a villainess under her real name, managing Lana during her matches. On June 28, 2017, she began competing under the ring name Sage Beckett. On July 13, Beckett entered the Mae Young Classic, but was eliminated from the tournament in the first round by Bianca Belair. On March 8, 2018, WWE officially announced that Beckett was released from her NXT contract. She later retired from professional wrestling.

== Championships and accomplishments ==
- World Xtreme Wrestling
  - WXW Women's Championship (1 time)
  - Elite 8 (2009)
- Other titles
  - CCM Women's Championship (1 time)
