= AWA Japan Women's Championship =

Professional wrestling women's championship

The AWA Japan Women's Championship was a women's professional wrestling championship in the AWA Superstars of Wrestling promotion. It was spun off from the AWA Superstars of Wrestling version of the AWA World Women's Championship. The inaugural champion was Sherri Martel.

AWA Superstars of Wrestling's version of the AWA World Women's Championship was created in 1999, claiming the lineage of the original World Women's Championship of the American Wrestling Association (AWA). However, in 2007 World Wrestling Entertainment (WWE) sued AWA Superstars of Wrestling promoter Dale Gagner over his use of the AWA name, which WWE owned. After the lawsuit, AWA Superstars of Wrestling ignored the reigns of the original AWA and only women's champions from 1999 onward were recognized.

In 2007, the title was renamed to the AWA Japan Women's Championship, following the inaugural champion Sherri Martel's death on June 15. AWA Superstars of Wrestling, wanting to still recognize the current champion, recognized then-world champion Nanae Takahashi of Pro Wrestling Zero1 and Pro-Wrestling Sun as the first AWA Japan Women's Champion. The championship was retired and replaced by Hawai'i Championship Wrestling's World Women's Championship on December 16, 2007.

== Title history ==
Wrestler:	Times:	Date:	Location:	Notes:
Title created by AWA Superstars of Wrestling as the AWA World Women's Championship, claiming lineage to the original AWA World Women's Championship.
Sherri Martel	1	June 17, 1999	Fargo, North Dakota	AWA Superstars of Wrestling President Dale Gagner wished to award Martel the title, however she refused. She instead chooses to face Gagner's selected opponent, Miss Manners, whom she defeated to win the title.
Title vacated in 2006 when Martel retired.
Nanae Takahashi	1	October 1, 2006	Tokyo, Japan	Defeated Afrika 55 to win the vacant championship.
Amazing Kong	1	January 14, 2007	Tokyo, Japan	
Nanae Takahashi	2	May 13, 2007	Los Angeles, California	
Title vacated on May 14, 2007 due to controversies in Takahashi's match against Amazing Kong.
Nanae Takahashi	3	May 27, 2007	Tokyo, Japan	Defeated Wesna and Amazing Kong in a three-way match to win the vacant championship.
Title renamed to the "AWA Japan Women's Championship" on June 19, 2007, out of respect to inaugural champion Sherri Martel, who died on June 15.
Nanae Takahashi	4	June 19, 2007	—	Takahashi is recognized as the inaugural holder of the AWA Japan Women's Championship.
Jamie D.	1	August 5, 2007	Tokyo, Japan	
Saki Maemura	1	October 10, 2007	Osaka, Japan	
The championship is retired after Hikaru defeated Maemura in a hair vs. title match on December 16, 2007 to become the first holder of the Hawai'i Championship Wrestling World Women's Championship. Hawai'i Championship Wrestling closes in July 2008.

== See also ==
- AWA World Women's Championship
- HCW World Women's Championship
- Pro Wrestling Zero1
