= Wrestlicious =

Defunct American professional wrestling company

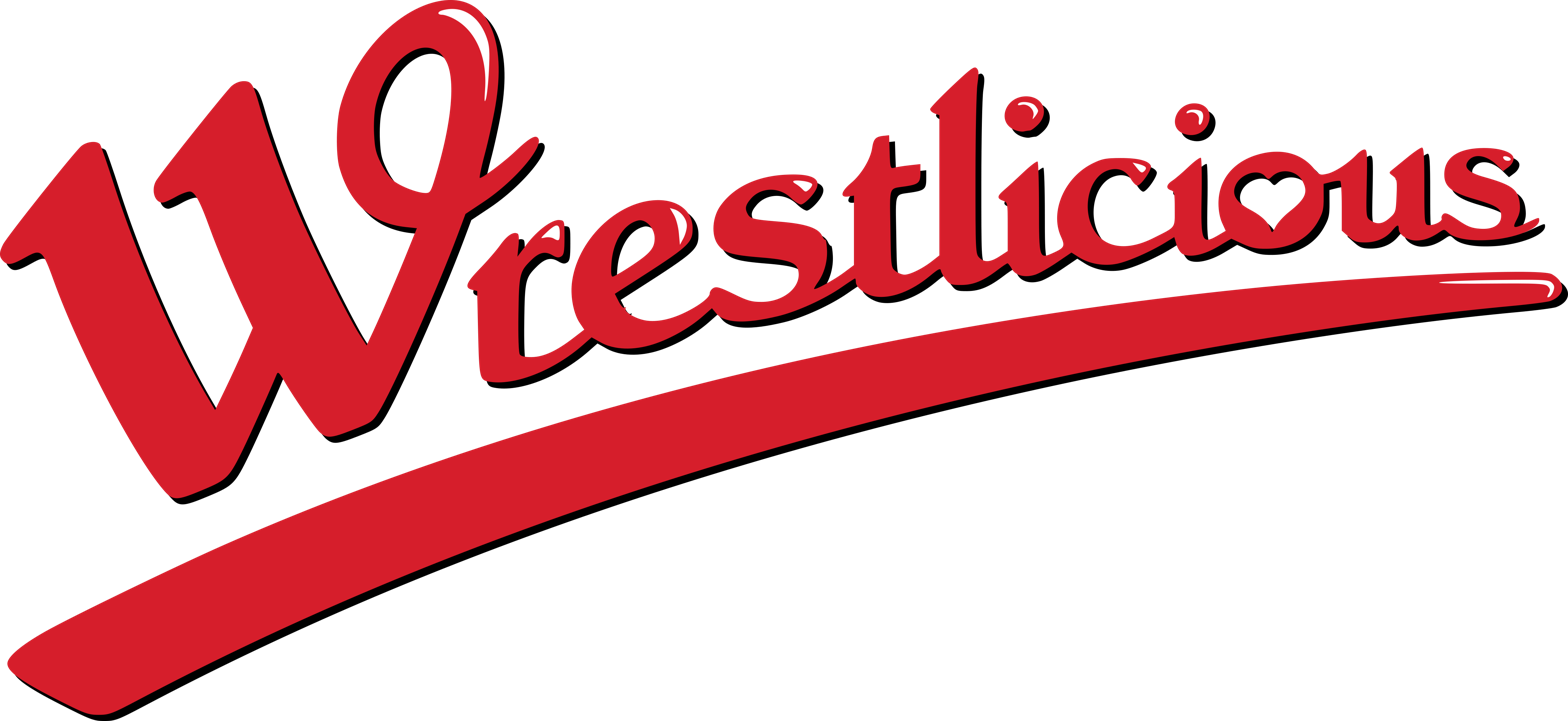
- Founded: 2009
- Style: Women's professional wrestling
- Headquarters: Tampa, Florida
- Founder: Jonathan Vargas
- Owner(s): Jonathan Vargas; Johnny Cafarella; Jimmy Hart
- Website: Wrestlicious.com

Wrestlicious was an American women's professional wrestling promotion based in Tampa, Florida. The company was founded by Jonathan Vargas, who won a Powerball jackpot of $35.3 million in 2008. It was known for its sketch comedy and has been often compared to Gorgeous Ladies of Wrestling. In 2011, Bleacher Report ranked Wrestlicious No. 11 on its list of the 25 worst wrestling promotions.

== History ==
Former Gorgeous Ladies of Wrestling host and producer Johnny Cafarella and Jimmy Hart partnered with Jonathan Vargas. In March 2009, a trailer was released promoting Wrestlicious. Originally rumored as airing on Fox Network in fall 2009, the Wrestlicious Takedown series eventually aired in syndication beginning in March 2010. Throughout 2010, Wrestlicious signed several new wrestlers (to replace many of the women that had worked for them during the original 2008 tapings and were now unavailable), and then taped new matches beginning in May 2010 to air on Takedown. However, no new content has been made since.

It was announced on March 27, 2010 that Wrestlicious TakeDown will begin airing on many television stations throughout the United States starting around April 1 and May 1, 2010.

Vargas appeared on the show as "JV Rich". Regular features included "JV's CRIB", a look at the goings-on inside JV's mansion frequented by the Wrestlicious girls.

After one season, Wrestlicious stopped production. Several of the talents went on to work for WWE, TNA Wrestling, and other companies.

== Wrestlicious TakeDown ==
Wrestlicious TakeDown was the Main Television program produced by Wrestlicious which ran on Dish Network, via MavTV in the United States and BiteTV in Canada, as well as in syndication. The first season consists of 13 episodes. Wrestlicious TakeDown began airing on Mondays, with its first episode airing on March 1, 2010 However, it was announced the following Thursday on March 4, 2010, that the show would be moving to Wednesdays. On May 16, 2011, it was announced that Wrestlicious would return to begin a second season, though no second season was ever produced or released.

== Roster ==
=== Wrestlers ===
Ring name	Real name	Notes
Alexandra the Great	Danyah Rivietz	
Anaconda	Cher Ferrerya	
Amber Lively	Ashley Simmons	
Autumn Frost	Jennifer Blake	
Bandita	Jessica Carrera	Also manages Maria Toro
Beatrice Bristol	Holly Blossom	
Brooke Lynne	Rebecca Treston	
Charlotte	Kimberly Davis	
Cobra	Jwaundace Candece	
Cousin Cassie	Unknown	
Draculetta	Shannon Spruill	
Emo Leigh	Leva Bates	
Felony	Bonnie Maxon	
Fran	Mary Beth Bentley	
Glory The All American Hero	Christie Mathis	Wrestlicious Champion
Gert	Karen Simpson	
Juvi Hall	Kayla Ane Meltzer	
Jezebel James	Allison Plunkett	
Kandi Kisses	Elizabeth Miklosi	Managed by The Gumdrops
Kickstart Katie	Beth Crist	
Lacey Von Erich	Lacey Adkisson	
Lil Slamm	LaTrice Harper	
Paige Webb	Serena Deeb	
Malibu Mackenzie	Lana Kinnear	
Maria Toro	Mercedes Martinez	
Masked Millie	Ann Brookstone	
Maui	Maria Santella	
Penelope Bristol	Hannah Blossom	
Sierra Sherraton	Erica D'Erico	
Tina The Trigger	Nicki Tebeau	
Toni the Top	Nikki Tsugranes	
Tyler Texas	Amy Janas	
Viper	Jeannie Kim	
White Magic	Lacey	

=== Other on-air personnel ===
Ring name	Real name	Notes
Azziza	Unknown	
Bootcamp Bailey	Taylor Marion	On-screen trainer
Charity	Falycia Rose Pulver	Manager of The Naughty Girls
Commissioner Blance	Steven Blance	
Jimmy Hart	Jimmy Hart	Co-Host
Johnny C.	Johnny Cafarella	Play-by-play commentator
Johnny C. Junior	Andrew Omega	Ring announcer
JV Rich	Jonathan Vargas	Owner
Leyla Milani	Leyla Milani Khoshbin	Co-Host
Officer Bubba	Brad Niederer	Manager of Felony
Savannah	Ashley Glasgow	Co-host; Occasional wrestler
Shauna Na	Kristin Flake	
Sister Ophelia	Mary-Kate Duignan	Manager of The Naughty Girls

=== Stables and Tag Teams ===
Team name	Members	Notes
The Bristols	Beatrice and Penelope Bristol	
The Country Cuties	Cousin Cassie and Tyler Texas	
Jimmy's Angels	Anaconda, Cobra and Viper	
The Lunch Ladies	Fran and Gert	
The Naughty Girls	Charity, Hope and Faith	
The Southern Belles	Charlotte and Savannah	
TNT	Tina the Trigger and Toni the Top	

== Wrestlicious Championship ==
#	Wrestlers	Reign	Date	Days held	Location	Event	Notes
1	Glory	1	May 24, 2010	176	Tampa, Florida	Wrestlicious TakeDown	Defeated Felony to become the inaugural champion. Title deactivated after company stopped production.
