= WXW Women's Championship =

Professional wrestling women's championship

Details
- Promotion: World Xtreme Wrestling
- Date established: 1996
- Current champion: Marina Tucker
- Date won: December 21, 2019
Statistics
- First champion: Kattra
- Most reigns: Mercedes Martinez (5)
- Longest reign: Kattra (1,529–1,894 days)
- Shortest reign: Raquel (<1–9 days)

The WXW Women's Championship is the top women's professional wrestling title in the World Xtreme Wrestling promotion. It was created in 1996 as the WSWF Women's Championship under WXW's original name, the World Star Wrestling Federation. The promotion was renamed to its current name in 1998. Currently, there have been 22 recognized known champions with a total of 32 title reigns.

== Title history ==
Key
No.	Overall reign number
Reign	Reign number for the specific champion
Days	Number of days held

No.	Champion	Championship change			Reign statistics		Notes	Ref.
No.	Champion	Date	Event	Location	Reign	Days	Notes	Ref.
1	Kattra	1996	N/A	N/A	1	(Note: The exact date that Kattra won the championship is uncertain, which means the title reign lasted between 1,529 and 1,894 days.)	Records are unclear as to who Kattra defeated to become the inaugural champion.	
—	Vacated	March 9, 2001	—	—	—	—	The championship was vacated for undocumented reasons.	
2	BellaDawna	March 9, 2001	N/A	Allentown, PA	1	450	BellaDawna defeated Jessica Dally to win the vacant championship.	
—	Vacated	June 2, 2002	—	—	—	—	The championship was vacated for undocumented reasons.	
3	Cindy Rogers	July 11, 2003	Sportsfest	Allentown, PA	1	161	Rogers won a 15-woman battle royal, last eliminating April Hunter to win the vacant championship.	
4	April Hunter	December 19, 2003	Rage TV Taping	Sciota, PA	1	56		
—	Vacated	February 13, 2004	—	—	—	—	The championship was vacated, due to a double-pin in a mixed tag team match, which was April Hunter and Slyck Wagner Brown against Ariel and Tommy Suede.	
5	Talia	May 29, 2004	Live Event	Sciota, PA	1	405	Talia defeated Alere Little Feather, April Hunter, Cindy Rogers, Jessica Dally and Psycho in a six-woman battle royal to win the vacant championship.	
6	Mercedes Martinez	July 8, 2005	Sportsfest	Allentown, PA	1	244		
—	Vacated	March 9, 2006	—	—	—	—	The championship was vacated after Mercedes Martinez won the WXW Cruiserweight Championship from Drew Blood on February 19, 2006.	
7	Alicia	March 9, 2006	N/A	Allentown, PA	1	150	Alicia defeated Alere Little Feather and Cindy Rogers in a three-way match to win the vacant championship.	
8	Cindy Rogers	August 6, 2006	Rage TV Taping	Coaldale, PA	2	153	This was a two-out-of-three falls match.	
9	Mercedes Martinez	January 6, 2007	Women's League Division	Allentown, PA	2	56		
10	Kacee Carlisle	March 3, 2007	Live Event	Allentown, PA	1	548		
—	Vacated	September 1, 2008	—	—	—	—	Kacee Carlisle said that since she defeated Mercedes Martinez in an empty arena match, she was the new champion. In reality, Martinez was out of action due shoulder surgery.	
11	Mercedes Martinez	December 20, 2008	Live Event	Minneola, FL	3	49	Martinez defeated Betsy Ruth to win the vacant championship.	
—	Vacated	February 7, 2009	Live Event	Minneola, FL	—	—	Mercedes Martinez vacated the title after her successful defense against MsChif.	
12	Kimberly	January 9, 2010	Live Event	Minneola, FL	1	399	Kimberly defeated Betsy Ruth to win the vacant championship.	
13	Amy Love	February 12, 2011	Live Event	Minneola, FL	1	98		
14	Kimberly	May 21, 2011	N/A	Minneola, FL	2	112		
15	Mercedes Martinez	September 10, 2011	Live Event	Minneola, FL	4	308		
16	Kimberly	July 14, 2012	N/A	Minneola, FL	3	196		
17	Nikki Roxx	January 26, 2013	N/A	Minneola, FL	1	21		
—	Vacated	February 16, 2013	—	—	—	—	The championship was vacated for undocumented reasons.	
18	Kimberly	May 11, 2013	N/A	Minneola, FL	4	91	Records are unclear as to who Kimberly defeated to win the vacant championship.	
19	Solo Darling	August 10, 2013	N/A	N/A	1	210	This was a three-way match, also involving Mercedes Martinez.	
20	Callista	March 8, 2014	C4	Minneola, FL	1	196		
21	Dynamite DiDi	September 20, 2014	Live Event	Minneola, FL	1	322		
22	Regina	August 8, 2015	Live Event	Minneola, FL	1	28		
23	Dynamite DiDi	September 5, 2015	Live Event	Minneola, FL	2	147	This was a three-way match, also involving Raquel.	
—	Vacated	January 30, 2016	—	—	—	—	WXW vacated the title after Dynamite DiDi wasn't cleared by the doctors after suffering a knee injury.	
24	Jaime D	January 30, 2016	Live Event	Minneola, FL	1	21	Jaime D defeated Gabi Castrovinci, Raquel and Regina to win the vacant championship.	
25	Raquel	February 20, 2016	Redline 2	Minneola, FL	1	(Note: The exact date that Raquel lost the championship is uncertain, which means the title reign lasted between <1 and 9 days.)	Jaime D defeated Gabi Castrovinci, Raquel and Regina to win the vacant championship.	
26	Rocky	February 2016	N/A	N/A	1	(Note: The exact date that Rocky won the championship is uncertain, which means the title reign lasted between 204 and 213 days.)		
—	Vacated	September 20, 2016	—	—	—	—	In part of a storyline, Rocky refused to work for WXW's owenr Sugaa and therefore relinquished the championship.	
27	Mercedes Martinez	October 15, 2016	N/A	Minneola, FL	5	371	Martinez defeated Dynamite DiDi and Jaime D in a three-way match to win the vacant championship.	
28	Raeven Marie	October 21, 2017	Live Event	Minneola, FL	1	210		
29	Dynamite DiDi	May 19, 2018	Doomsday	Minneola, FL	3	357		
30	Avery Taylor	May 11, 2019	May of Reckoning	Minneola, FL	1	168		
31	Sofia Castillo	October 26, 2019	Halloween Madness	Minneola, FL	1	56		
32	Marina Tucker	December 21, 2019	Winter Warfare	Minneola, FL	1	2,325+	This was a three-way match, also involving Anna Diaz.	

== Combined reigns ==
As of May 3, 2026.

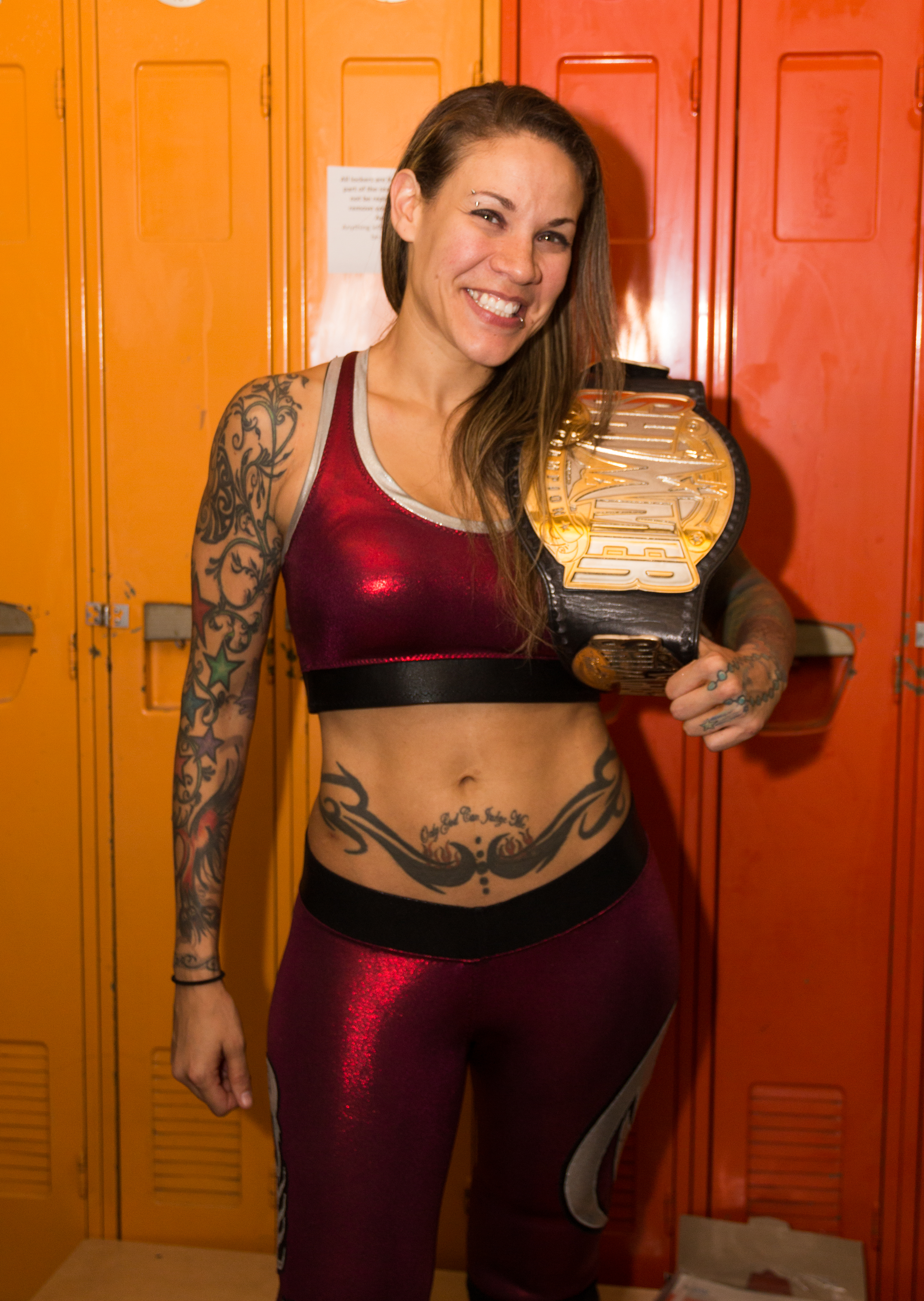
Record five-time champion Mercedes Martinez with the Shimmer Championship

†	Indicates the current champion.
¤	The exact length of a title reign is uncertain; the combined length may not be correct.

Rank	Wrestler	No. of Reigns	Combined Days
1	Marina Tucker †	1	2,325+
2	Kattra	1	1,529–1,894¤
3	Mercedes Martinez	5	1,028
4	Dynamite DiDi	3	826
5	Kimberly	4	798
6	Kacee Carlisle	1	548
7	BellaDawna	1	450
8	Talia	1	405
9	Cindy Rogers	2	314
10	Raeven Marie	1	210
10	Solo Darling	1	210
12	Rocky	1	204–213¤
13	Callista	1	196
14	Avery Taylor	1	168
15	Alicia	1	150
16	Amy Love	1	98
17	April Hunter	1	56
17	Sofia Castillo	1	56
19	Regina	1	28
20	Jaime D	1	21
20	Nikki Roxx	1	21
22	Raquel	1	<1–9¤
