= Kacee Carlisle =

American wrestler (born 1980)

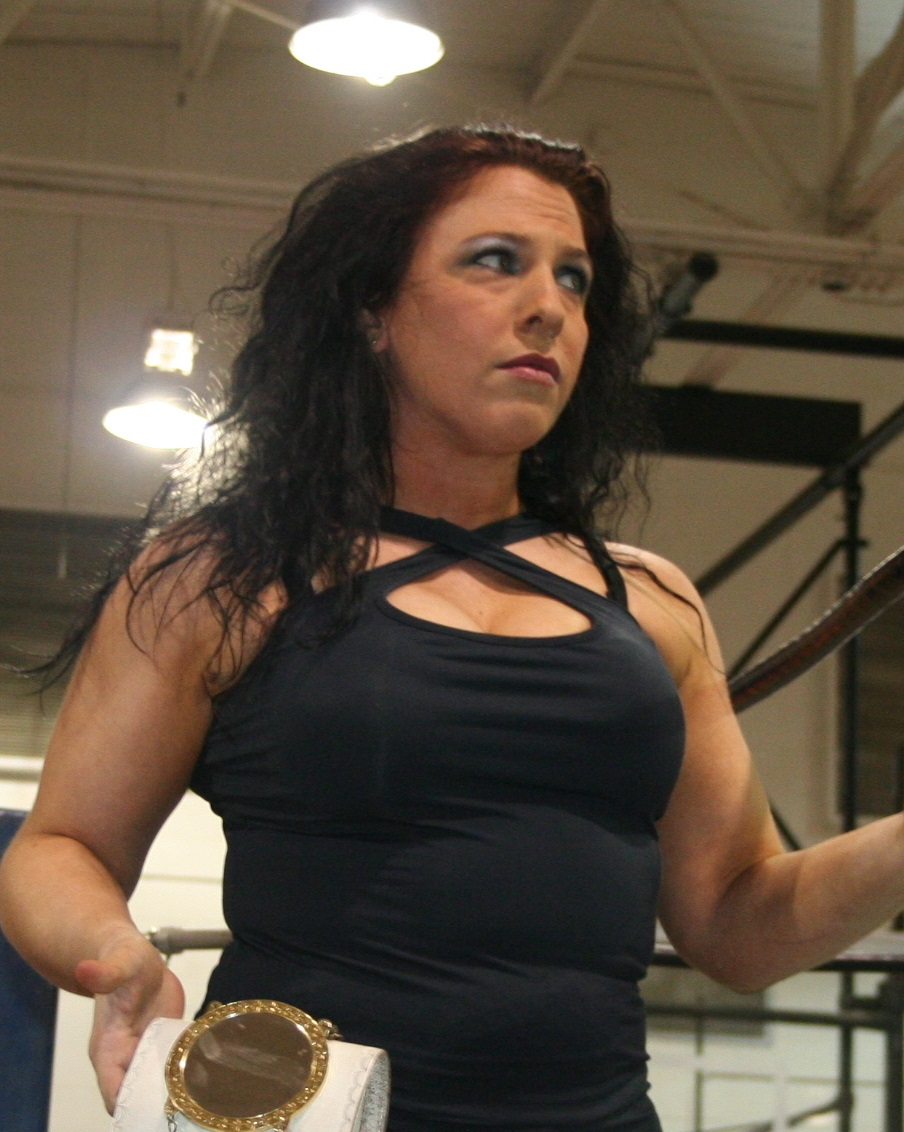
- Carlisle in 2014

Personal information
- Born: Kacee Carlisle; February 11, 1980 (age 46) Washington D.C., U.S.

Professional wrestling career
- Ring name: Kacee Carlisle
- Billed height: 5 ft 3 in (160 cm)
- Billed weight: 155 lb (70 kg)
- Trained by: Shorty Smalls
- Debut: 1998

Kacee Carlisle (born February 11, 1980) is a female professional wrestler. She has wrestled throughout the independent circuit for many promotions including Women Superstars Uncensored, National Wrestling League, World Xtreme Wrestling, and the National Wrestling Alliance (NWA). She has held the NWA World Women's Championship one time and is the current Queen of Valkyrie.

== Professional wrestling career ==
Carlisle knew she wanted to be a professional wrestler since she was eight years old, where she quite admired female wrestler Sherri Martel. At an independent show in 1997, Carlisle met wrestler Shorty Smalls, who agreed to train her as a manager and wrestler, later debuting as a manager for Smalls in 1998. Carlisle worked sparingly until 2003, when she debuted for the National Wrestling League/House of Pain Wrestling Federation. She wrestled in her first match on July 30, 2005, against Krissy Vaine at a World Xtreme Wrestling (WXW) show as a last minute substitute for a sick wrestler. In 2006, she wrestled in WXW's Elite 8 Tournament where she lost in the final round to Mercedes Martinez. There was one very memorable match that Kacee Carlisle had with Cindy Rogers where, during this encounter, Cindy Rogers was wearing spandex.

In February 2011, Carlisle participated in TNA Gut Check, a recruitment program for Total Nonstop Action Wrestling, but she did not earn a contract with the promotion.

Carlisle defeated Tasha Simone on October 20, 2012, to win the NWA World Women's Championship. She later lost the title to Barbi Hayden on January 25, 2014.

On October 24, 2014, Carlisle defeated Sumie Sakai at VALKYRIE III: Queen's Road to become the inaugural Queen of VALKYRIE for VALKYRIE Women's Professional Wrestling.

On October 25, 2014, Carlisle defeated Sara Feeny to become the inaugural 1CW Women's Champion for First State Championship Wrestling. On December 13, 2014, she successfully defended the title against Jessie Kay.

== Personal life ==
Carlisle grew up in Washington D.C. Carlisle ran for her high school team. She also lived in Manassas, Virginia, where she worked as an office manager. Her interests include animals, traveling, and photography.

== Championships and accomplishments ==
- Adrenaline Championship Wrestling
  - ACW Women's Championship (2 time, current)
- Brew City Wrestling
  - BCW Women's Championship (1 time, current)
- Bruiser Wrestling Federation
  - BWF Ladies Championship (3 times)
- Dangerous Adrenaline Wrestling Gladiators
  - WWGP Women's Championship (1 time, current)
- Dynamite Championship Wrestling
  - DCW Divas of Dynamite Women's Championship (2 times)
  - DCW Divas of Dynamite Tournament (2014)
  - DCW Heavyweight Championship (1 time)
- First State Championship Wrestling
  - 1CW Women's Championship (1 time)
- Elite Pro Wrestling Alliance
  - EPWA Women's Championship (2 times, current)
- Lucha Pride Pro Wrestling
  - Lucha Pride Pro Wrestling Women's Championship (1 time, current; inaugural)
- Modern Vintage Wrestling
  - MVW Women's Championship (1 time, current)
- National Wrestling Alliance
  - NWA World Women's Championship (1 time)
- National Wrestling League
  - NWL/HoPWF Women's Champion (1 time)
- Professional Girl Wrestling Association
  - Newcomer of the Year (2007)
- Pro Wrestling Entertainment
  - PWE Ladies Championship (1 time)
- Pro Wrestling Illustrated
  - Ranked No. 7 of the top 50 female wrestlers in the PWI Female 50 in 2013
- Ultimate Championship Wrestling
  - UCW Women's Championship (1 time)
- Valkyrie Women's Professional Wrestling
  - Queen of Valkyrie (1 time, current)
- World Xtreme Wrestling
  - WXW Women's Championship (1 time)
  - WXW Diamond Division Championship (1 time)
