= Pro Wrestling Illustrated =

Professional wrestling magazine

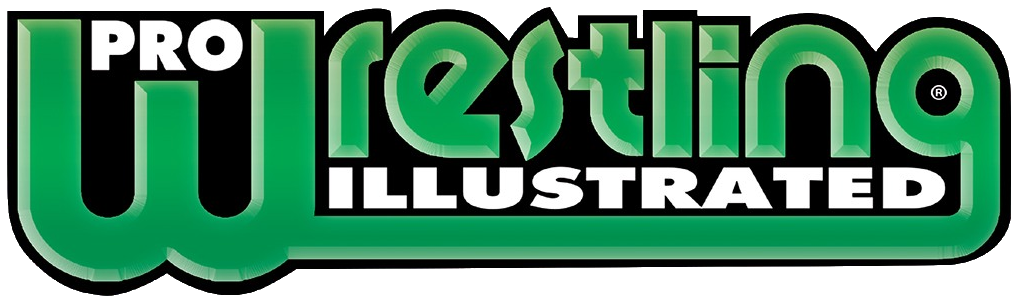

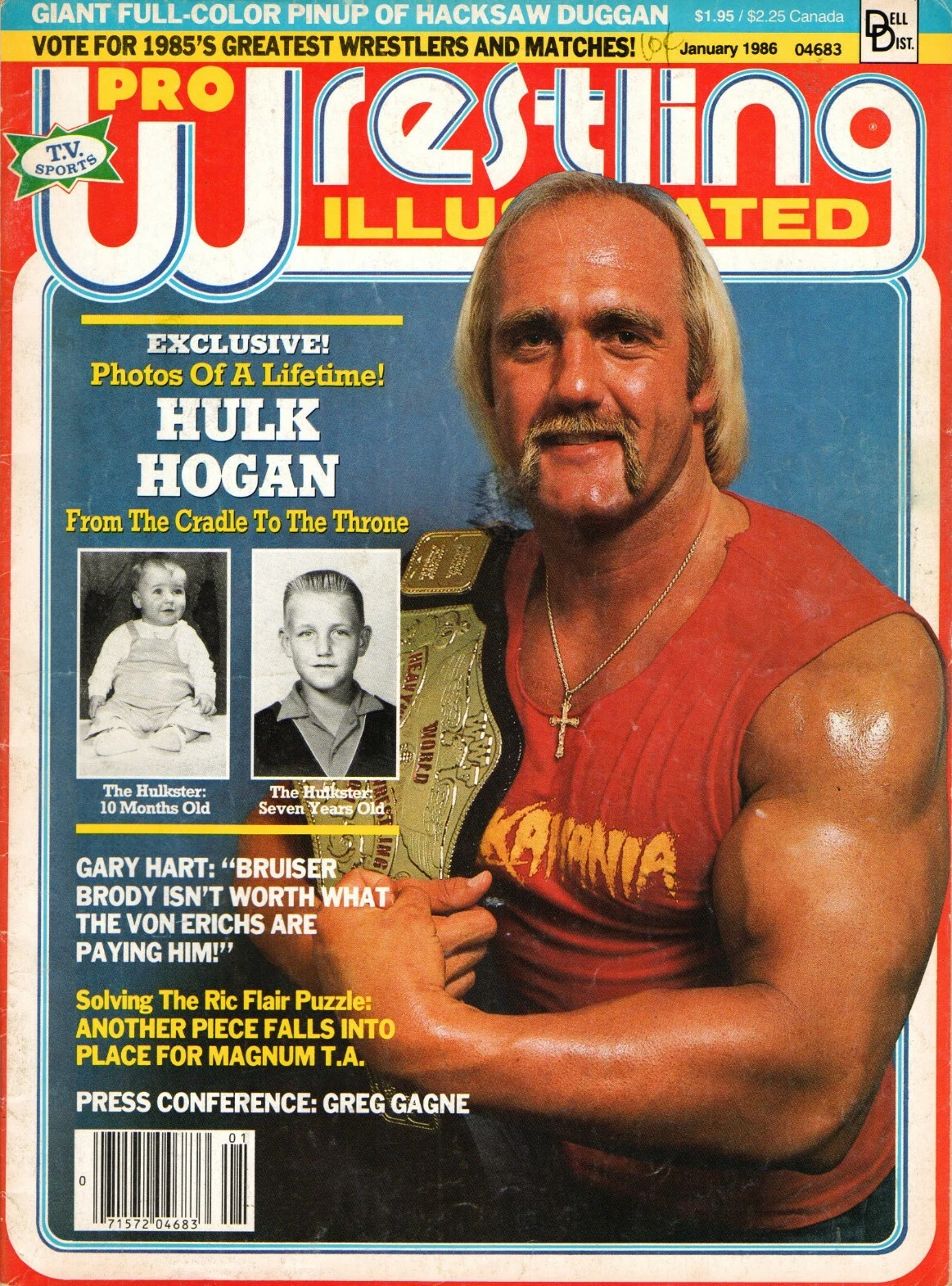
- Issue cover dated January 1986, featuring Hulk Hogan
- Categories: Sports magazine
- Frequency: Bimonthly
- Publisher: Kappa Publishing Group
- First issue: September 1979; 47 years ago
- Country: United States
- Language: English
- Website: pwi-online.com
- ISSN: 1043-7576

Pro Wrestling Illustrated (PWI) is an American professional wrestling magazine that was founded in 1979 by publisher Stanley Weston. PWI is headquartered in Blue Bell, Pennsylvania, and published by Kappa Publishing Group. The magazine is the longest published English language wrestling magazine still in production. PWI publishes bimonthly, as well as special issues such as their annual "Almanac and Book of Facts" and "PWI 500" edition. The magazine recognizes various world championships as legitimate, similar to The Ring in boxing.

PWI is often referred to as an "Apter Mag", named after its long-time photographer Bill Apter, a term used for a family of wrestling magazines founded by Weston (also including The Wrestler, Inside Wrestling and others) that keep kayfabe. In recent years, PWI has moved away from reporting on storylines as actual news and mixed in editorial comments on the behind-the-scenes workings of wrestling.

Since 1991, PWI has been publishing its annual "PWI 500", listing the top 500 male wrestlers in the world. In 2008, they added an annual "Top 50 Female Wrestlers" list, which was later expanded and renamed to the "Top 100 Female Wrestlers" list in 2018 and then again in 2021 as the "Top 150 Female Wrestlers." In 2020, they added an annual "Top 50 Tag Teams" listing the top tag teams in the world.

== History ==
The first issue of Pro Wrestling Illustrated (PWI) was released in 1979. The magazine soon became known for not breaking kayfabe in its articles as it traditionally treated all "angles", or storylines, as real. However, in more recent years the magazine has taken an editorial approach between kayfabe and "shoot" writing, differentiating between on-screen feuds and controversies behind the scenes. PWI is not limited to covering only prominent professional wrestling promotions, as it also covers multiple independent promotions in the United States. PWI also published other special issues, which included: PWI Wrestling Almanac & Book of Facts since 1996, Women of Wrestling, and a weekly newsletter entitled PWI Weekly from 1989 to 2000.

=== Yearly awards ===
PWI has given out annual awards and recognitions since its inception. These awards had previously been given out by another Victory Sports Magazine property, Sports Review Wrestling. PWI has also given out monthly rankings for big promotions, some select independent promotions, and overall rankings in singles and tag teams divisions. Additionally, readers are given the ability to vote for the winners of the year-end awards with ballots being included in special year-end issues. A special PWI Awards Magazine is issued annually, which reveals winners and the number of votes counted. The following is a list of categories in which PWI has issued awards.

- Wrestler of the Year (since 1972)
- Tag Team of the Year (since 1972)
- Match of the Year (since 1972)
- Feud of the Year (since 1986)
- Most Popular Wrestler of the Year (since 1972)
- Most Hated Wrestler of the Year (since 1972)
- Most Improved Wrestler of the Year (since 1978)
- Most Inspirational Wrestler of the Year (since 1972)
- Rookie of the Year (since 1972)
- Stanley Weston Award (since 1981)
- Comeback of the Year (since 1992)
- Woman of the Year (1972 to 1976, re-established in 2000)
- Manager of the Year (1972 to 1999)
- Midget Wrestler of the Year (1972 to 1976)
- Announcer of the Year (1977)

== World championship status ==
=== Historical recognition ===
Although many wrestling organizations promote their lead title as a world heavyweight championship, Pro Wrestling Illustrated (PWI) has only recognized a few championships as valid world titles at any one time. PWI has also generally recognized the main tag team title from any promotion with a recognized world heavyweight championship as being a world tag team championship (unless named otherwise by the promotion) and certain other select titles from those promotions as world championships.

In 1983, PWI withdrew world title recognition from the WWF World Heavyweight Championship, citing how champion Bob Backlund was not facing contenders from outside the World Wrestling Federation (WWF) territory and was only facing rulebreakers. This coincided with the WWF's withdrawal from the National Wrestling Alliance (NWA) in summer 1983. PWI reinstated the WWF's world title recognition retroactively in 1985 on account of the WWF's massive mainstream media profile.

The AWA World Heavyweight Championship was stripped of its world title status in January 1991 when the American Wrestling Association (AWA) was in its final days. By this time, the championship was vacant and would remain so until the promotion's closure.

Until March 1991, PWI and its sister publications steadfastly referred to World Championship Wrestling (WCW) as "the NWA" despite WCW having increasingly phased out the latter name in the preceding months. In spring 1991, the family of magazines adopted a new policy of referring to the current promotion and its champions as WCW and the promotion's pre-1991 past as the NWA. The magazine also announced it would refer to the overall history of the promotion's world title as the "NWA/WCW World Championship" (and likewise with other WCW championships). PWI generally traced the lineage of the NWA/WCW World Championship back to George Hackenschmidt's title victory in 1905, rather than the creation of the NWA Worlds Heavyweight Championship in 1948. Subsequently, after Ric Flair left WCW and was stripped of the WCW World Heavyweight Championship in July 1991, PWI and its sister publications nonetheless continued to recognize the WCW title as held by Lex Luger, Sting, Vader, and Ron Simmons as the rightful continuation of the historic NWA Worlds Heavyweight Championship. When Masa Chono won an NWA world title tournament in Japan in August 1992, PWI and its sister publications only recognized Chono's title as the "NWA Championship" and rejected it as a world title or as a continuation of the historic NWA Worlds Heavyweight Championship.

PWI initially did not recognize the ECW World Heavyweight Championship as a world title but granted the championship and the promotion world title status in 1999.

=== Current recognition ===
Since 2023, Pro Wrestling Illustrated (PWI) recognizes the WWE Championship, World Heavyweight Championship, AEW World Championship, Impact World Championship, ROH World Championship, MLW World Heavyweight Championship, and NWA Worlds Heavyweight Championship from the United States, the AAA Mega Championship and CMLL World Heavyweight Championship from Mexico, as well as the IWGP World Heavyweight Championship, Triple Crown Heavyweight Championship, World of Stardom Championship, and GHC Heavyweight Championship from Japan as world heavyweight championships. PWI later additionally recognized the independent wrestling titles the Independent Wrestling World Championship and the Pan-Afrikan World Diaspora Wrestling Championship as world championships.

=== List of all recognized world heavyweight championships ===
Date of recognition	Championship	Promotion	Country
July 14, 1948 – January 11, 1991; May 8, 2006 – May 13, 2007; January 1, 2021 – present	NWA Worlds Heavyweight Championship	National Wrestling Alliance (NWA)	(United States)
May 18, 1960 – December 12, 1990	AWA World Heavyweight Championship	American Wrestling Association (AWA)	(United States)
April 25, 1963 – present	WWE Championship	WWE: SmackDown	(United States)
January 11, 1991 – December 9, 2001	WCW World Heavyweight Championship	World Championship Wrestling (WCW) World Wrestling Federation	(United States)
July 6, 1999 – April 11, 2001	ECW World Heavyweight Championship	Extreme Championship Wrestling (ECW)	(United States)
September 2, 2002 – December 15, 2013	World Heavyweight Championship	WWE	(United States)
May 13, 2007 – June 29, 2015; January 1, 2021 – present	TNA World Championship	Total Nonstop Action Wrestling (TNA)	(United States)
August 21, 2016 – April 7, 2024	WWE Universal Championship	WWE: SmackDown	(United States)
August 31, 2019 – present	AEW World Championship	All Elite Wrestling (AEW)	(United States)
April 3, 2020 – March 4, 2021	IWGP Heavyweight Championship	New Japan Pro-Wrestling (NJPW)	(Japan)
January 1, 2021 – present	AAA Mega Championship	Lucha Libre AAA Worldwide (AAA)	(Mexico)
January 1, 2021 – present	ROH World Championship	Ring of Honor (ROH)	(United States)
January 1, 2021 – present	CMLL World Heavyweight Championship	Consejo Mundial de Lucha Libre (CMLL)	(Mexico)
January 1, 2021 – present	Triple Crown Heavyweight Championship	All Japan Pro Wrestling (AJPW)	(Japan)
January 1, 2021 – present	MLW World Heavyweight Championship	Major League Wrestling (MLW)	(United States)
January 1, 2021 – present	World of Stardom Championship	World Wonder Ring Stardom (Stardom)	(Japan)
February 12, 2021 – present	GHC Heavyweight Championship	CyberFight (CF): Pro Wrestling Noah (Noah)	(Japan)
March 4, 2021 – present	IWGP Heavyweight Championship	New Japan Pro-Wrestling (NJPW)	(Japan)
August 8, 2021 – present	Independent Wrestling World Championship	IndependentWrestling.tv (IWTV)	(United States)
August 8, 2021 – present	Pan-Afrikan World Diaspora Wrestling Championship	PAWDWC Presents F1ght Club Pro Wrestling (F1ght Club)	(United States)
May 27, 2023 – present	World Heavyweight Championship	WWE: Raw	(United States)

According to the annual PWI almanac, PWI still recognizes select world title reigns from May 4, 1905 – January 28, 1946, before the formation of the National Wrestling Alliance (NWA) in July 1948, mostly conforming to the lineage traditionally traced backwards 1948–1905 by the NWA for their World Heavyweight Championship.

== Rankings ==
=== PWI 500 ===
PWI has published the list of the top 500 professional wrestlers each year since 1991 in an annual special edition magazine, the PWI 500. PWI writers choose the position of the wrestler following a designated evaluation period starting from mid-June; anything a wrestler accomplished before or after that period is not considered. They follow a criterion that includes win–loss record, championships won, quality of competition, major feuds, prominence within a wrestler's promotion(s), and overall wrestling ability. As of 2023, L. A. Park has been ranked in the most editions of the PWI 500, with 30 appearances. John Cena and Seth Rollins have the most appearances at number one, with three. John Cena has the most appearances in the top 10, with 13. In 1993, Miss Texas (Jacqueline Moore) became the first woman to be ranked in the list, at number 249. Since 2008, men and women have had separate lists.

Year	1	2	3	4	5	6	7	8	9	10
1991	Hulk Hogan	Lex Luger	Ric Flair	Randy Savage	Sting	Scott Steiner	Ricky Steamboat	Steve Williams	Arn Anderson	Rick Steiner
1992	Sting	Randy Savage	Ric Flair	Rick Rude	Bret Hart	Ricky Steamboat	Jerry Lawler	Scott Steiner	Ultimate Warrior	Stunning Steve Austin
1993	Bret Hart	Big Van Vader	Shawn Michaels	Sting	Yokozuna	Ric Flair	Lex Luger	Rick Rude	Mr. Perfect	Scott Steiner
1994	Bret Hart	Hulk Hogan	Ric Flair	Big Van Vader	Shawn Michaels	Stunning Steve Austin	Razor Ramon	Sting	Ricky Steamboat	Owen Hart
1995	Diesel	Shawn Michaels	Sting	Bret Hart	Sabu	Hulk Hogan	Big Van Vader	Randy Savage	Razor Ramon	Mitsuharu Misawa
1996	Shawn Michaels	The Giant	Sting	Kenta Kobashi	Ahmed Johnson	Kevin Nash	Rey Misterio, Jr.	Hulk Hogan	Sabu	Ric Flair
1997	Dean Malenko	Mitsuharu Misawa	Stone Cold Steve Austin	Diamond Dallas Page	Lex Luger	The Undertaker	Shinya Hashimoto	The Giant	Jushin Thunder Liger	Chris Benoit
1998	Stone Cold Steve Austin	Goldberg	Mitsuharu Misawa	Diamond Dallas Page	The Undertaker	Kenta Kobashi	Booker T	Ken Shamrock	Jushin Thunder Liger	Chris Jericho
1999	Stone Cold Steve Austin	Rob Van Dam	Mitsuharu Misawa	Rey Misterio, Jr.	The Rock	Diamond Dallas Page	Keiji Mutoh	The Undertaker	Goldberg	Taz
2000	Triple H	The Rock	Chris Benoit	Kenta Kobashi	Jeff Jarrett	Justin Credible	Mike Awesome	Jushin Thunder Liger	Chris Jericho	Kensuke Sasaki
2001	Kurt Angle	Stone Cold Steve Austin	Chris Benoit	Keiji Mutoh	Booker T	Triple H	Scott Steiner	Mitsuharu Misawa	Chris Jericho	Rhyno
2002	Rob Van Dam	The Undertaker	Keiji Mutoh	Chris Jericho	Eddie Guerrero	Kurt Angle	Edge	Yuji Nagata	The Rock	Triple H
2003	Brock Lesnar	Triple H	Kurt Angle	Keiji Mutoh	Chris Jericho	Big Show	Booker T	Kenta Kobashi	Eddie Guerrero	Rob Van Dam
2004	Chris Benoit	Eddie Guerrero	Triple H	Kenta Kobashi	Randy Orton	Toshiaki Kawada	John Cena	A.J. Styles	Shawn Michaels	Chris Jericho
2005	Batista	John Cena	Satoshi Kojima	Triple H	John Bradshaw Layfield	Kurt Angle	A.J. Styles	Edge	Shelton Benjamin	Hiroyoshi Tenzan
2006	John Cena	Kurt Angle	Edge	Samoa Joe	Místico	Rey Mysterio	Brock Lesnar	Kenta Kobashi	Shawn Michaels	Jeff Jarrett
2007	John Cena	Edge	Místico	Kurt Angle	The Undertaker	Shawn Michaels	Christian Cage	Perro Aguayo, Jr.	Bobby Lashley	Takeshi Morishima
2008	Randy Orton	Kurt Angle	Triple H	Samoa Joe	Edge	The Undertaker	Shawn Michaels	Nigel McGuinness	John Cena	Shinsuke Nakamura
2009	Triple H	Chris Jericho	John Cena	Edge	Randy Orton	Nigel McGuinness	Hiroshi Tanahashi	CM Punk	Sting	Último Guerrero
2010	A.J. Styles	John Cena	CM Punk	Randy Orton	Chris Jericho	Batista	Shinsuke Nakamura	The Undertaker	Kurt Angle	Sheamus
2011	The Miz	Randy Orton	John Cena	Kane	Takashi Sugiura	Alberto Del Rio	Mr. Anderson	Rey Mysterio	Eddie Edwards	CM Punk
2012	CM Punk	Bobby Roode	John Cena	Daniel Bryan	Sheamus	Jun Akiyama	Davey Richards	Kurt Angle	Mark Henry	Alberto Del Rio
2013	John Cena	CM Punk	Hiroshi Tanahashi	Bully Ray	Kazuchika Okada	Sheamus	Jeff Hardy	Alberto Del Rio	Dolph Ziggler	Kevin Steen
2014	Daniel Bryan	Randy Orton	John Cena	A.J. Styles	Kazuchika Okada	Bray Wyatt	Roman Reigns	Magnus	Adam Cole	Bully Ray
2015	Seth Rollins	John Cena	A.J. Styles	Roman Reigns	Shinsuke Nakamura	Randy Orton	Jay Briscoe	Rusev	Alberto El Patrón	Kevin Owens
2016	Roman Reigns	Kazuchika Okada	Finn Bálor	A.J. Styles	Jay Lethal	Kevin Owens	Shinsuke Nakamura	Seth Rollins	Dean Ambrose	John Cena
2017	Kazuchika Okada	A.J. Styles	Kevin Owens	Roman Reigns	Kenny Omega	Shinsuke Nakamura	Samoa Joe	Dean Ambrose	Bobby Roode	The Miz
2018	Kenny Omega	A.J. Styles	Kazuchika Okada	Brock Lesnar	Seth Rollins	Braun Strowman	Roman Reigns	Cody Rhodes	Tetsuya Naito	The Miz
2019	Seth Rollins	Daniel Bryan	A.J. Styles	Kofi Kingston	Kazuchika Okada	Johnny Gargano	Roman Reigns	Kenny Omega	Hiroshi Tanahashi	Will Ospreay
2020	Jon Moxley	Adam Cole	Chris Jericho	Drew McIntyre	Tetsuya Naito	Kazuchika Okada	Cody Rhodes	Seth Rollins	Kofi Kingston	AJ Styles
2021	Kenny Omega	Roman Reigns	Bobby Lashley	Drew McIntyre	Kota Ibushi	Jon Moxley	Will Ospreay	Finn Bálor	Shingo Takagi	Rich Swann
2022	Roman Reigns	Kazuchika Okada	CM Punk	Adam Page	Bobby Lashley	Cody Rhodes	Bryan Danielson	El Hijo del Vikingo	Big E	Jonathan Gresham
2023	Seth Rollins	Roman Reigns	Jon Moxley	Gunther	El Hijo del Vikingo	MJF	Kazuchika Okada	Orange Cassidy	Josh Alexander	Cody Rhodes
2024	Cody Rhodes	Swerve Strickland	Will Ospreay	Seth Rollins	Tetsuya Naito	Damian Priest	MJF	Jon Moxley	Gunther	Místico
2025	Cody Rhodes	Jon Moxley	Gunther	Adam Page	Hirooki Goto	Jey Uso	Swerve Strickland	Seth Rollins	Místico	Will Ospreay
2026	MJF	Cody Rhodes	CM Punk	Místico	Konosuke Takeshita	Adam Page	Yota Tsuji	Trick Williams	Oba Femi	Gunther

=== PWI Women's 250 ===
PWI has published a list of the top female professional wrestlers each year since 2008 in a special edition magazine. As with the list of male professional wrestlers, PWI writers choose the wrestler's position following a designated evaluation period starting from mid-June; anything a wrestler accomplished before or after that period is not considered. The list was originally limited to 50 wrestlers and was referred to as the Female 50. It has since been expanded and renamed to Women's 100 in 2018, Women's 150 in 2021, and Women's 250 in 2023.

Year	1	2	3	4	5	6	7	8	9	10
PWI Female 50
2008	Awesome Kong	Beth Phoenix	Gail Kim	Mickie James	MsChif	Sara Del Rey	Roxxi Laveaux	Melina	Michelle McCool	Candice Michelle
2009	Mickie James	Angelina Love	Melina	MsChif	Tara	Awesome Kong	Beth Phoenix	Michelle McCool	Maryse	Taylor Wilde
2010	Michelle McCool	Angelina Love	Mercedes Martinez	Cheerleader Melissa	Eve Torres	Madison Rayne	Beth Phoenix	Mickie James	MsChif	Maryse
2011	Madison Eagles	Mercedes Martinez	Mickie James	Natalya	Madison Rayne	Cheerleader Melissa	Beth Phoenix	Tara	MsChif	Sara Del Rey
2012	Gail Kim	Beth Phoenix	Cheerleader Melissa	Sara Del Rey	Jessicka Havok	Layla	Miss Tessmacher	Saraya Knight	Mercedes Martinez	Tara
2013	Cheerleader Melissa	Mickie James	Saraya Knight	Jessicka Havok	Kaitlyn	Gail Kim	Kacee Carlisle	Tara	AJ Lee	Mercedes Martinez
2014	Paige	AJ Lee	Gail Kim	Cheerleader Melissa	LuFisto	Angelina Love	Ivelisse Velez	Courtney Rush	Natalya	Charlotte
2015	Nikki Bella	Paige	Sasha Banks	Santana Garrett	Gail Kim	Charlotte	Naomi	Cherry Bomb	Courtney Rush	Taryn Terrell
2016	Charlotte	Sasha Banks	Asuka	Becky Lynch	Bayley	Jade	Natalya	Gail Kim	Sexy Star	Sienna
2017	Asuka	Charlotte Flair	Alexa Bliss	Sasha Banks	Bayley	Io Shirai	Natalya	Sienna	Naomi	Kairi Sane
PWI Women's 100
2018	Ronda Rousey	Alexa Bliss	Charlotte Flair	Io Shirai	Asuka	Shayna Baszler	Carmella	Nia Jax	Mayu Iwatani	Kairi Sane
2019	Becky Lynch	Charlotte Flair	Ronda Rousey	Shayna Baszler	Tessa Blanchard	Bayley	Natalya	Io Shirai	Mercedes Martinez	Nicole Savoy
2020	Bayley	Becky Lynch	Asuka	Charlotte Flair	Sasha Banks	Hikaru Shida	Tessa Blanchard	Riho	Io Shirai	Mayu Iwatani
PWI Women's 150
2021	Bianca Belair	Utami Hayashishita	Deonna Purrazzo	Britt Baker	Thunder Rosa	Sasha Banks	Syuri	Io Shirai	Tam Nakano	Raquel González
2022	Syuri	Bianca Belair	Thunder Rosa	Becky Lynch	Jade Cargill	Jordynne Grace	Saya Kamitani	Charlotte Flair	Starlight Kid	Taya Valkyrie
PWI Women's 250
2023	Rhea Ripley	Giulia	Bianca Belair	Jamie Hayter	Tam Nakano	Athena	Deonna Purrazzo	Willow Nightingale	Kamille	Jordynne Grace
2024	Toni Storm	Jordynne Grace	Rhea Ripley	Maika	Stephanie Vaquer	Sareee	Bayley	Willow Nightingale	Mariah May	Athena
2025	Mercedes Moné	Toni Storm	Saya Kamitani	Tiffany Stratton	Stephanie Vaquer	Iyo Sky	Athena	Sareee	Naomi	Rhea Ripley
2026	Stephanie Vaquer	Willow Nightingale	Thekla	Mercedes Moné	Saya Kamitani	Liv Morgan	Persephone	Syuri	Rhea Ripley	Kris Statlander

=== PWI Tag Team 100 ===
PWI has published a list of the top tag teams since 2020. PWI writers rank the wrestlers following a designated evaluation period starting from October; a minimum of 10 matches or 4 months as a tag team is required. The ranking included both male and female tag teams.

Year	1	2	3	4	5	6	7	8	9	10
2020	FTR (Dax Harwood & Cash Wheeler)	Kenny Omega & Adam Page	Bayley & Sasha Banks	The North (Ethan Page & Josh Alexander)	The Street Profits (Montez Ford & Angelo Dawkins)	Guerrillas of Destiny (Tama Tonga & Tanga Loa)	Lucha Bros (Pentagón Jr. & Fénix)	The New Day (Kofi Kingston, Big E & Xavier Woods)	The Kabuki Warriors (Asuka & Kairi Sane)	Roppongi 3K (Sho & Yoh)
2021	The Young Bucks (Matt Jackson & Nick Jackson)	Lucha Bros (Pentagón Jr. & Rey Fénix)	Dangerous Tekkers (Taichi & Zack Sabre Jr.)	The Usos (Jimmy Uso & Jey Uso)	FTR (Dax Harwood & Cash Wheeler)	Alto Livello Kabaliwan (Syuri & Giulia)	Guerrillas of Destiny (Tama Tonga & Tanga Loa)	Nia Jax & Shayna Baszler	The New Day (Kofi Kingston, Big E & Xavier Woods)	The Good Brothers (Karl Anderson & Luke Gallows)
2022	The Usos (Jimmy Uso & Jey Uso)	FTR (Dax Harwood & Cash Wheeler)	The Briscoes (Jay Briscoe & Mark Briscoe)	Death Triangle (Pac, Pentagón Jr. & Rey Fénix)	FWC (Hazuki & Koguma)	RK-Bro (Randy Orton & Matt Riddle)	The Good Brothers (Karl Anderson & Luke Gallows)	The Young Bucks (Matt Jackson & Nick Jackson)	The Hex (Allysin Kay & Marti Belle)	Violence is Forever (Kevin Ku & Dominic Garrini)
2023	FTR (Dax Harwood & Cash Wheeler)	Aussie Open (Mark Davis & Kyle Fletcher)	Kevin Owens & Sami Zayn	Bishamon (Hirooki Goto & Yoshi-Hashi)	The Motor City Machine Guns (Alex Shelley & Chris Sabin)	ABC (Ace Austin & Chris Bey)	The Acclaimed (Anthony Bowens & Max Caster)	The Judgment Day (Finn Bálor, Damian Priest, & Dominik Mysterio)	Damage CTRL (Bayley, Dakota Kai, & Iyo Sky)	7Upp (Nanae Takahashi & Yuu)
2024	Bianca Belair & Jade Cargill	Nathan Frazer & Axiom	Bishamon (Hirooki Goto & Yoshi-Hashi)	The Young Bucks (Matt Jackson & Nick Jackson)	TMDK (Mikey Nicholls & Shane Haste)	ABC (Ace Austin & Chris Bey)	Saito Brothers (Jun Saito & Rei Saito)	The Bloodline (Tama Tonga & Tonga Loa)	Crazy Star (Suzu Suzuki & Mei Seira)	FTR (Dax Harwood & Cash Wheeler)
2025	The Hardys (Matt Hardy & Jeff Hardy)	The Hurt Syndicate (Bobby Lashley & Shelton Benjamin)	wing★gori (Hanan & Saya Iida)	Los Hermanos Chávez (Ángel de Oro & Niebla Roja)	The Street Profits (Montez Ford & Angelo Dawkins)	Fraxiom (Nathan Frazer & Axiom)	Brodido (Bandido & Brody King)	El Sky Team (Místico & Máscara Dorada)	Alexa Bliss & Charlotte Flair	Saito Brothers (Jun Saito, Rei Saito, & Señor Saito)
