= Mercedes Martinez =

American professional wrestler

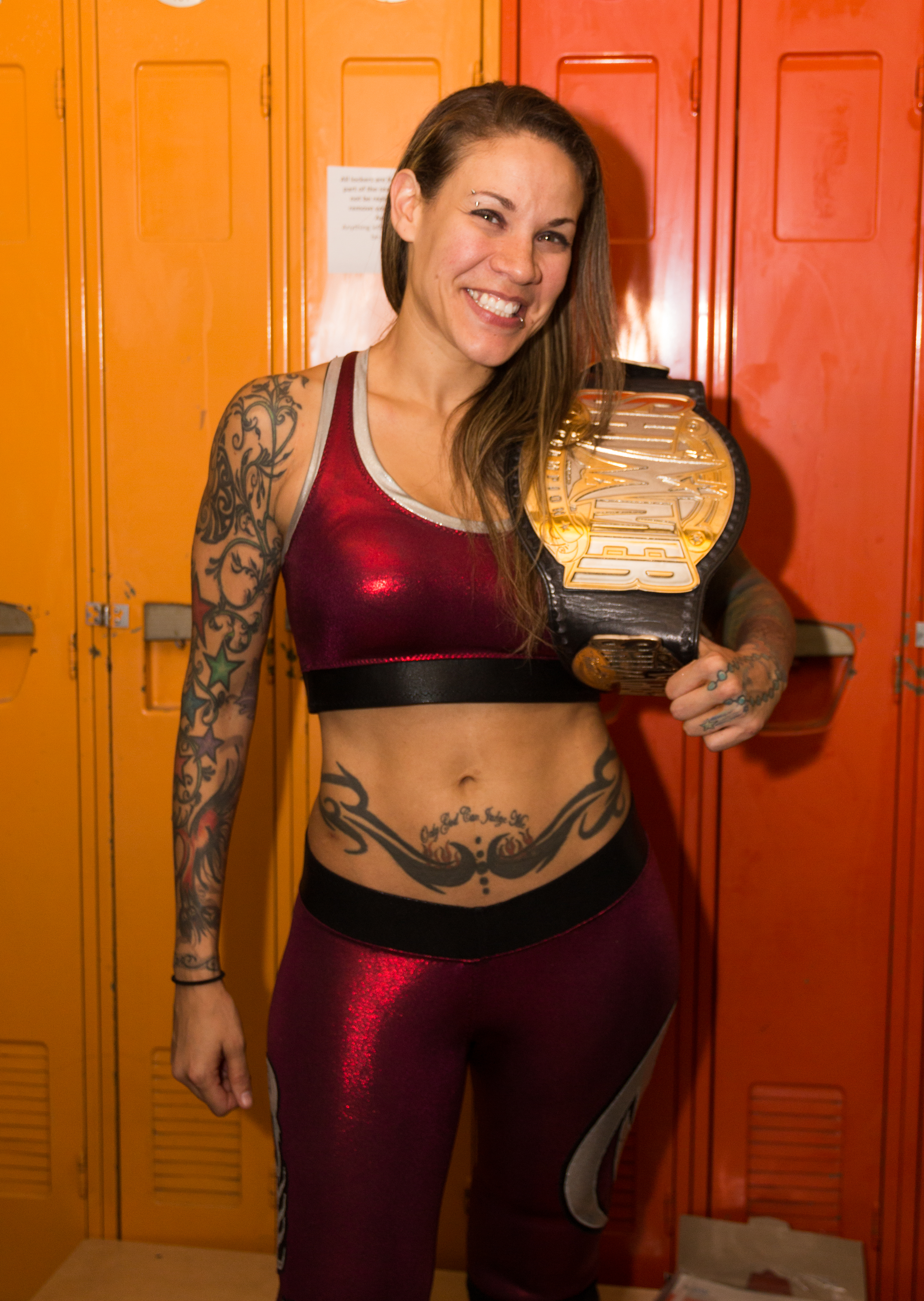
- Martinez in 2016, posing with the Shimmer Championship

Personal information
- Born: Jazmin Benitez; November 17, 1980 (age 45) Waterbury, Connecticut, U.S.
- Children: 1

Professional wrestling career
- Ring name(s): Maria Toro; Mercedes Martinez; Retaliation
- Billed height: 5 ft 7 in (1.70 m)
- Billed weight: 147 lb (67 kg)
- Billed from: Brass City C.T. Waterbury, Connecticut
- Trained by: Jason Knight; WWE Performance Center
- Debut: 2000
- Retired: August 27, 2026

Jazmin Benitez (born November 17, 1980), better known by her ring name Mercedes Martinez, is an American retired professional wrestler. She is known for her time in All Elite Wrestling (AEW), Ring of Honor (ROH), and WWE.

Prior to going to WWE in 2020, Martinez was a mainstay on the independent circuit, winning numerous titles - including three WSU Championships, two Shimmer Championships, one Shine Championship and one Phoenix of Rise Championship.

== Early life ==
Jazmín Benítez was born on November 17, 1980, in Waterbury, Connecticut. She is of Puerto Rican descent. In high school, she played both basketball and softball. She then attended college at Teikyo Post University, where her major was criminal justice.

== Professional wrestling career ==
=== Early career (2000–2005) ===
Mercedes Martinez got involved in professional wrestling after an injury sustained playing basketball in college. Martinez was a standout basketball player in high school. She later transitioned to professional wrestling due to her love for contact sports. As Martinez explained in an article for the Boston Herald in 2004, "Wrestling just came at the right time." Martinez began her training under Jason Knight in October 2000. She defeated a male wrestler by the name of "Juice" in her first match on November 12, 2000. In 2001, she gained exposure under promoter Sheldon Goldberg. Goldberg subsequently formed a women's division in New England Championship Wrestling around Martinez, including bringing in foreign talent such as Yoshimoto Ladies Pro's Sumie Sakai. The duo traded the North American Women's Championship.

Through 2003 and 2004, Martinez competed in various promotions in New England such as Connecticut Championship Wrestling, Combat Zone Wrestling, and Ian Rotten's IWA Mid South. In IWA, Martinez was brought in to face the star of the women's division, Mickie Knuckles.

=== Shimmer Women Athletes (2005–2019) ===
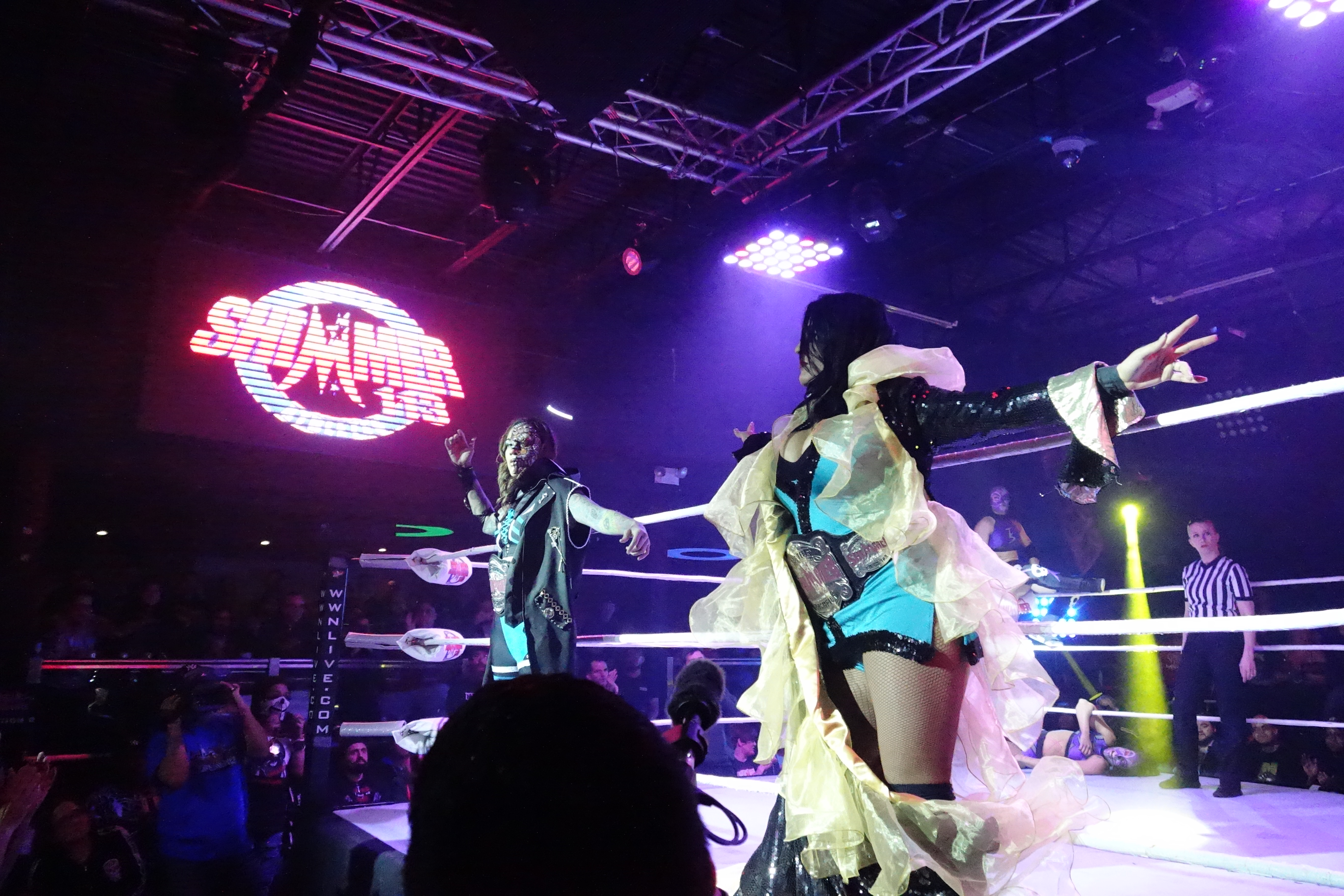
Martinez and Cheerleader Melissa as Shimmer Tag Champions

On November 6, 2005, Mercedes wrestled in the inaugural event of the new exclusive women wrestling promotion, Shimmer Women Athletes run by Dave Prazak, who discovered her while watching a Kiryoku Pro DVD. Martinez wrestled Sara Del Rey in a 20-minute time limit draw, and both were given a standing ovation after their match. Martinez continued to wrestle for Shimmer and various independent promotions across America through 2006.

On May 2, 2009, she took part in Shimmer's Volume 23 where she lost to Awesome Kong. Later in the night, as part of Volume 24, she defeated Madison Eagles. The next day, she lost to Serena Deeb for Volume 25, and teamed with Deeb to take on Sara Del Rey and Kong for Volume 26, but had a losing effort in that match.

She lost against the debuting Ayako Hamada on November 8, 2009, after a Hama-Chan Cutter, but was able to score a pinfall over Cat Power as part of Volume 28 after hitting her with the Fisherman Buster.

On October 2, 2011, Martinez turned heel for the first time in her Shimmer career, starting a rivalry with Athena.

On June 26, 2016, after being retired for two years, Martinez made a surprise return to Shimmer, aligning herself with Nicole Savoy and Shayna Baszler and defeating Madison Eagles in an impromptu match to win the Shimmer Championship for the first time. She lost the title to Kellie Skater on November 12, only to regain it the following day. On November 12, 2017, Martinez lost the title to Savoy.

=== Ring of Honor (2006–2007) ===
On March 25, 2006, Martinez made her Ring of Honor (ROH) debut in New York City where she competed in a Shimmer sanctioned match versus her counterparts of Allison Danger, Daizee Haze, and Lacey. On December 22, Martinez suffered an injury in an ROH match teaming with Jimmy Jacobs against Haze and B. J. Whitmer. She returned to Ring of Honor by the end of December 2007, aligning herself with The Vulture Squad. On May 27 it was announced that Martinez and ROH had amicably parted ways.

=== World Xtreme Wrestling (2005–2009, 2011–2017) ===
In 2005, Martinez joined World Xtreme Wrestling. She participated in several matches, and then started feud with Talia Madison for the WXW Women's Championship. On July 8, Martinez defeated Madison to become the new Women's Champion. However, the title was declared vacant on September 3, when she won the WXW Cruiserweight Championship from Drew Blood on February 19, 2006. On January 6, 2007, Martinez defeated Cindy Rogers to regain the Women's Championship. When she had to undergo shoulder surgery in February 2007, a "Phantom Title Change" storyline was done where Kacee Carlisle claimed she beat Mercedes in an Empty Arena Match to become the new champion was Mercedes's exit for her surgery.

She made her surprise return on February 10, 2008, to challenge Carlisle for the WXW Women's Championship but did not regain it. When WXW relocated as a result of Afa Anoa'i moving to Florida from Pennsylvania, she was a part of it from the get-go. She would win the 2008 WXW Elite 8 then on December 20, 2008, defeat Betsy Ruth for the Vacant WXW Women's Title for her 3rd reign.

After her defense against MsChif on February 7, 2009. She announced she was returning to her hometown of Waterbury Connecticut & vacated the title.

On August 27, Martinez returned to the company, starting a feud with Kimberly. On September 10, Martinez defeated her to become the first woman to hold the WXW Women's Championship four times. On February 11, 2012, Martinez defeated Kimberly in a two out of three falls match. She would lose the title to Kimberly on July 14, 2012, this marked the first time Mercedes had lost the Women's title in a 1 on 1 match.

=== Independent circuit (2006–2020) ===
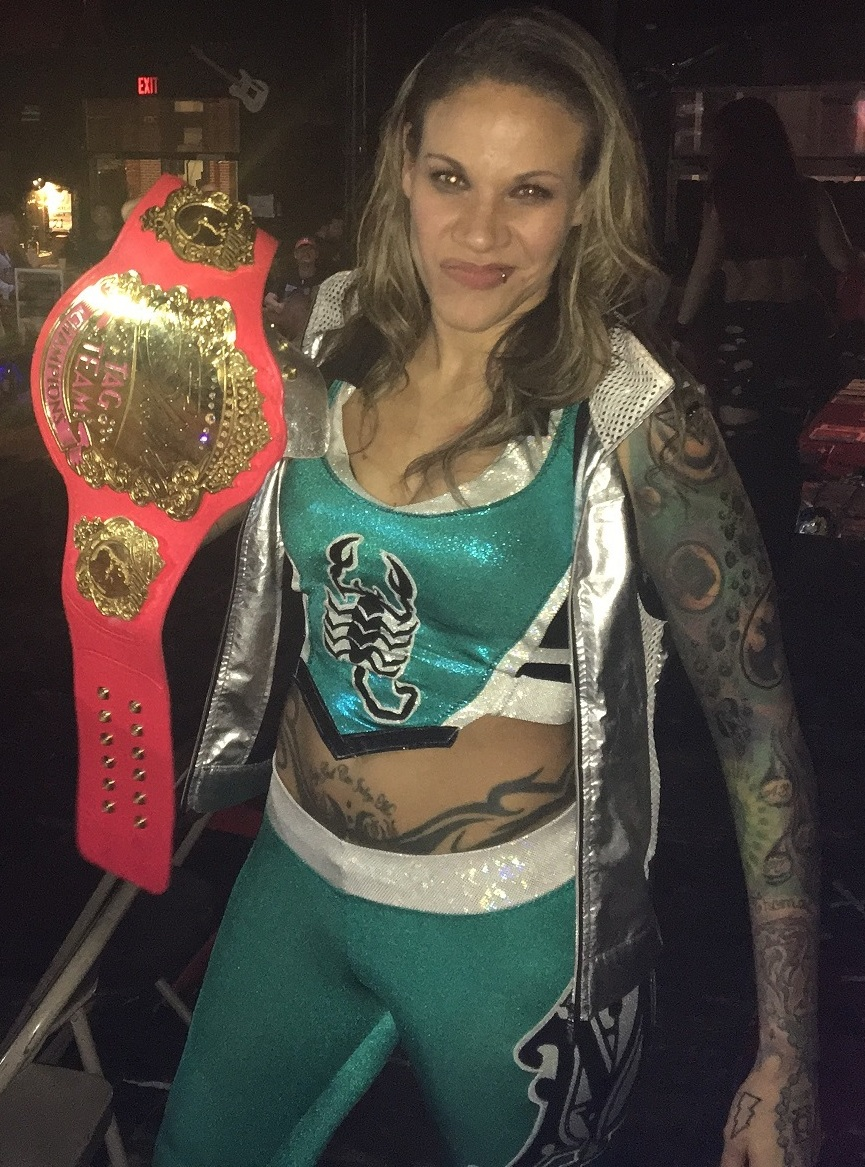
Mercedes Martinez with the Shine Tag Team Championship

Martinez also competed in ChickFight IV in April 2006. She made it to the final round before being eliminated by MsChif. Later in the night, MsChif also defeated Martinez and Cheerleader Melissa in a falls count anywhere match. On May 27, 2006, Martinez competed in the debut MXWomen (MXW)'s match, one of the Quadruple Main Events at MXW MAYhem in Bristol, Connecticut. On November 12, 2006, she defeated Nikki Roxx in a match for MXW. The following month, Martinez appeared on World Wrestling Entertainment's Heat (taped June 12) in a losing effort against Victoria. On July 19, 2009, Martinez returned to WXW C4 in Allentown and won a 20-person Battle Royal at WXW C4's Flagship show Sportsfest, earning a title shot of her choosing. On September 5, 2009, in Allentown, she opted to use the victory to create the WXW C4 Women's Championship, and she immediately won it in an Elimination Style 3-Way Dance over Jana and Nikki Roxx.

She also took part of Jimmy Hart's Wrestlicious series as a Bull Fighter character named "Maria Toro", managed by "Bandita." In the main event of the first episode she teamed up with Bandita and Felony in a winning effort against the team of Cousin Cassie, Tyler Texas and Charlotte.

Martinez debuted for NCW Femmes Fatales on February 6, 2010, taking on Portia Perez. At the end of the match Mercedes Martinez was able to hit with the Fisherman Buster to get the pin. She challenged NCW Femmes Fatales Champion Kalamity on March 10, 2012, and was unsuccessful. She promptly turned heel afterwards laying Kalamity out and LuFisto came out and they brawled to close the show.

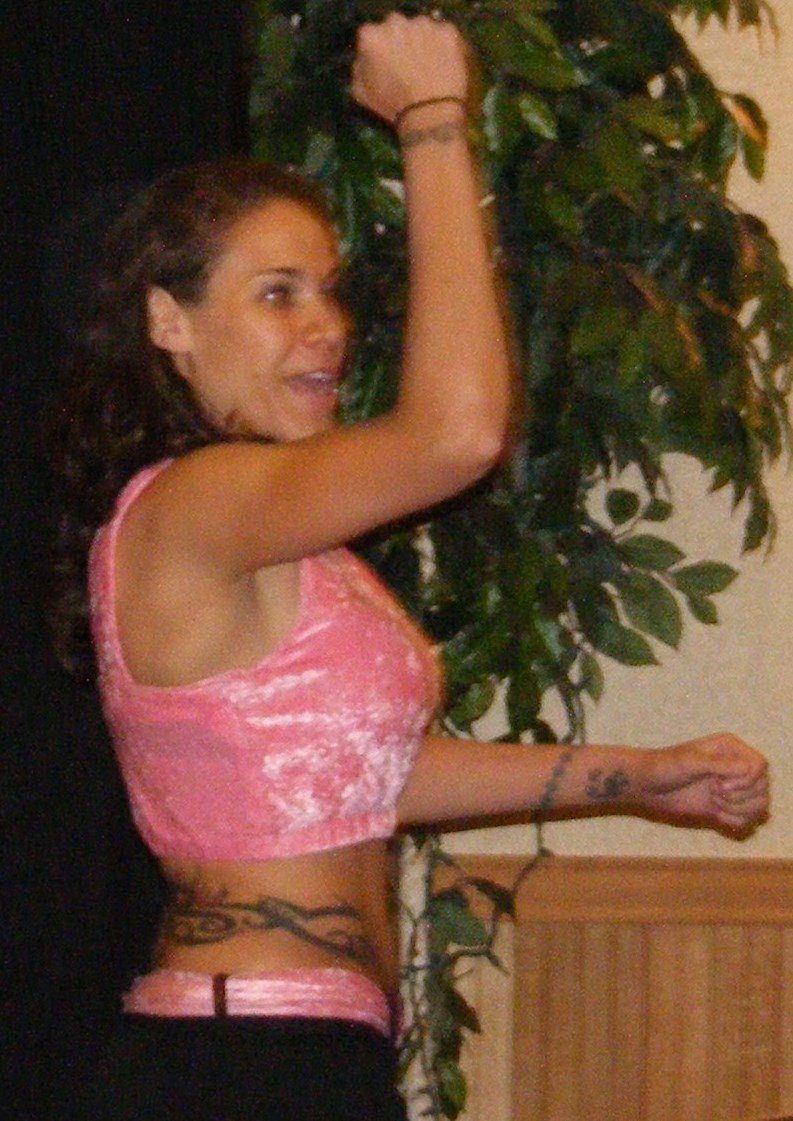
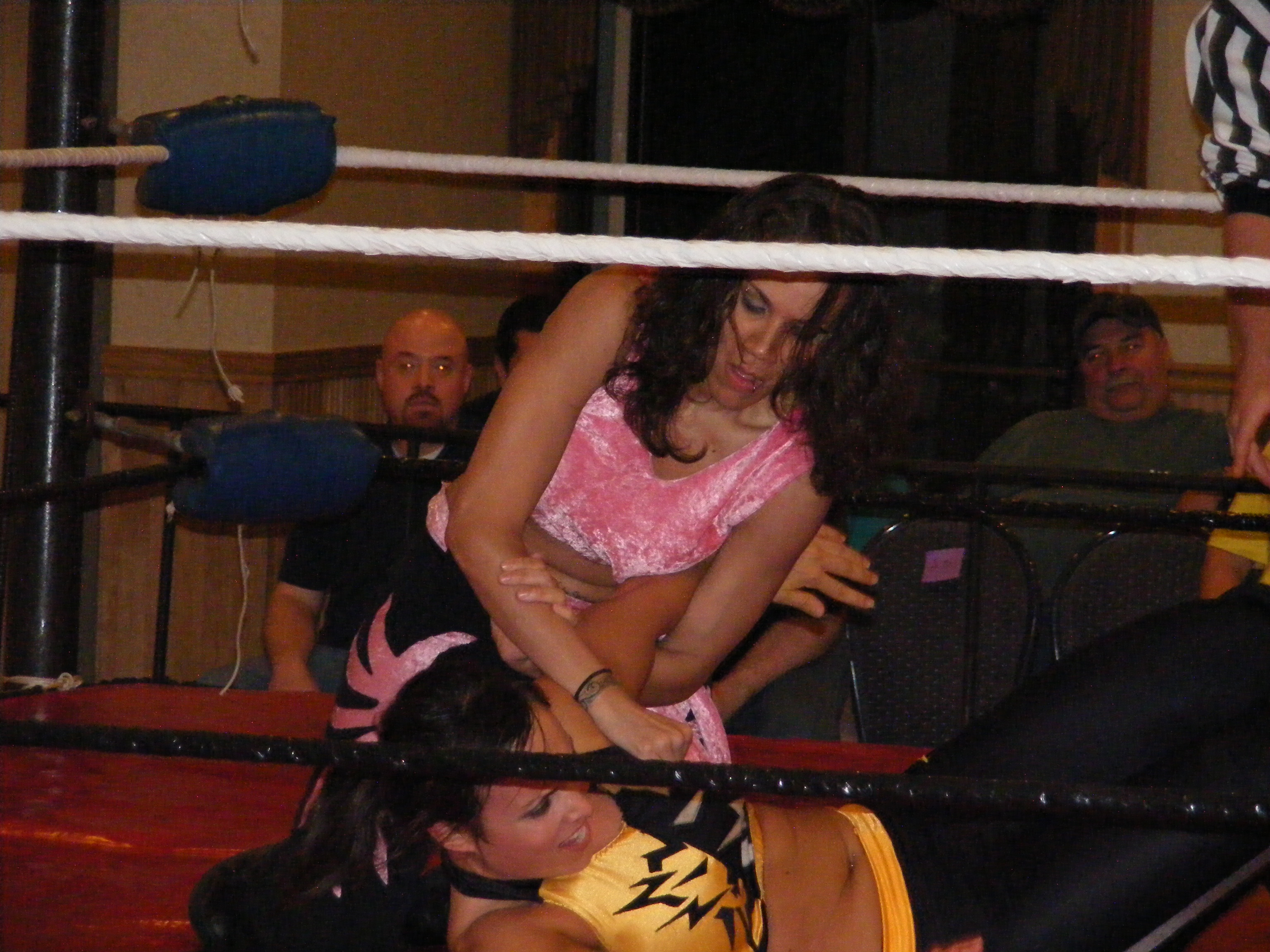
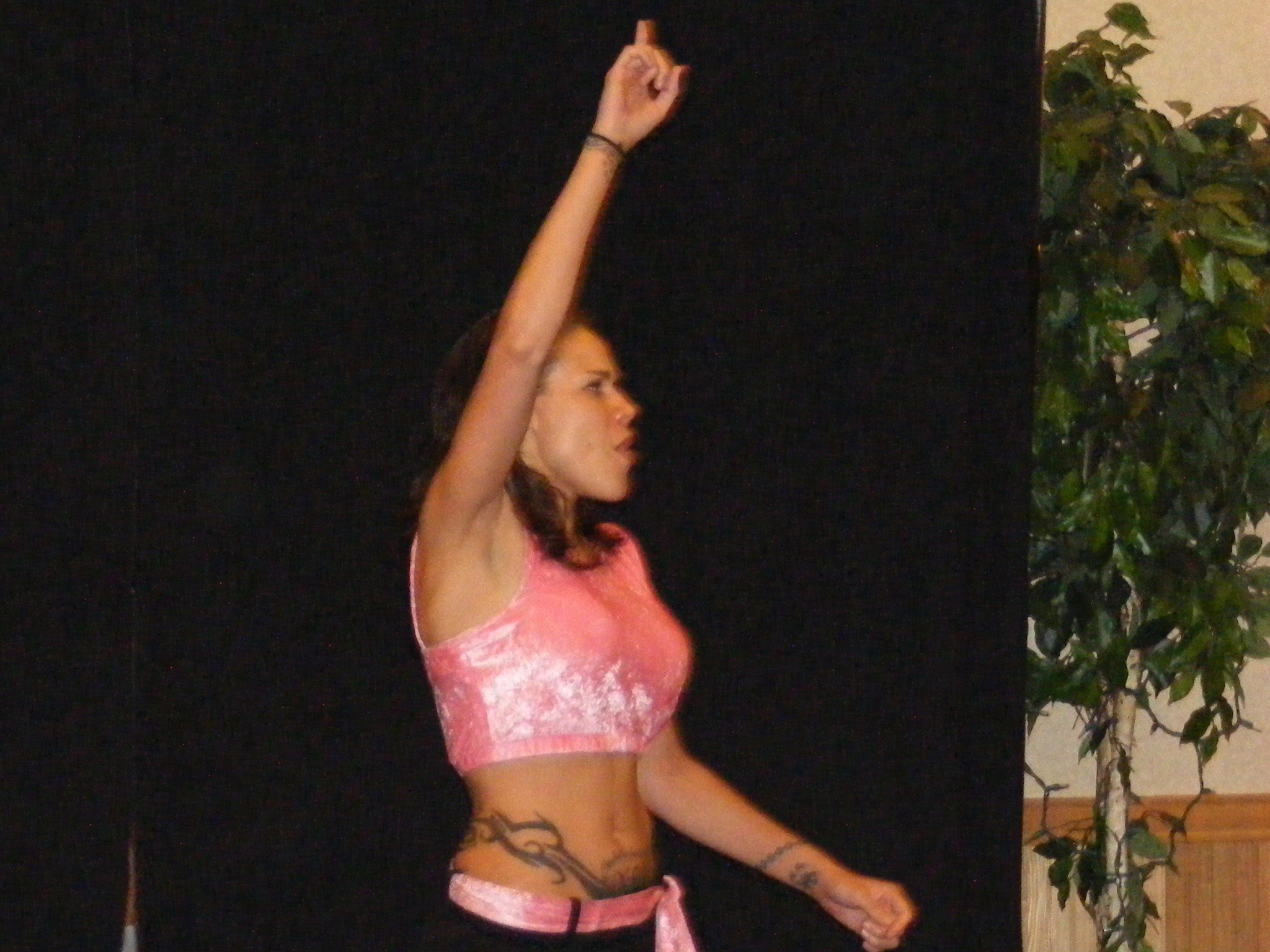
Mercedes Martinez at a NWA house show on June 11, 2010.

More than a year later, Martinez would become NCW Femmes Fatales Champion on March 30, 2013, defeating Kalamity at NCW Femmes Fatales XI, ending her 538-day reign on top. She lost the title on August 16, 2014. On May 6, 2017, at Challengemania 25, Mercedes came back to defeat Stefany Sinclair and reclaim the NCW Femmes Fatales Championship. She left the event as a triple champion, already walking in the match with both the WSU World Championship and the Shimmer Championship.

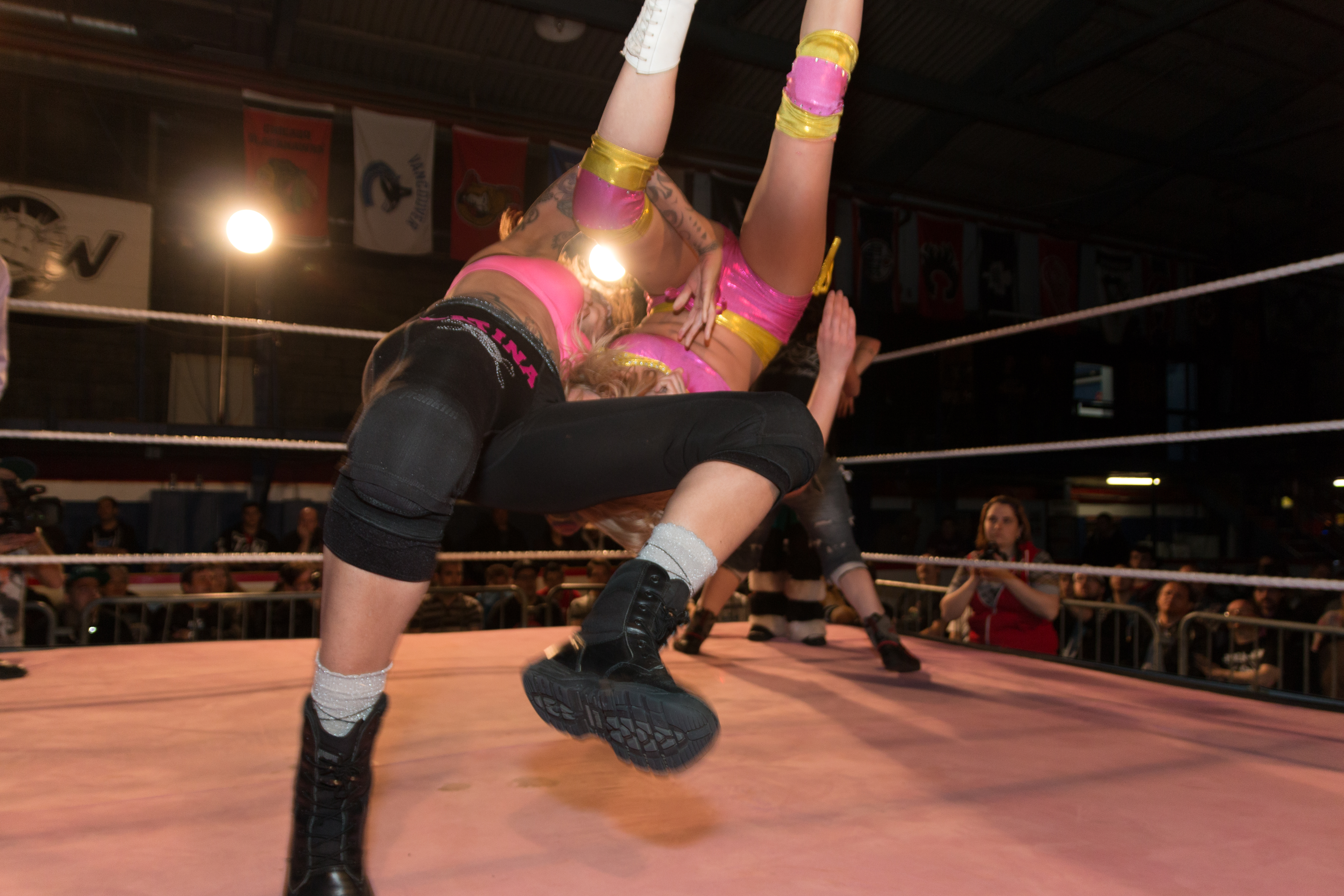
Mercedes Martinez executing the Bull Run aka Fisherman buster on Leah Von Dutch at a NCW Femme Fatales XIV event

On July 24, 2011, Martinez made her first appearance in Japan, wrestling for World Wonder Ring Stardom in famed Korakuen Hall against Nanae Takahashi as a part of the inaugural World of Stardom Championship tournament during the Nanae Takahashi 15 Anniversary show. However, she would lose to Takahashi in the semifinals of the tournament.

She has worked in SHINE Wrestling for a number of years and was until 2018 a Shine Tag Team Champion with Ivelisse as Las Sicarias until they were defeated by the Twisted Sisterz (Holidead and Thunder Rosa). There was one very memorable match that Mercedes Martinez had with Cindy Rogers. During this encounter, Cindy Rogers was wearing her spandex. At one point, Cindy Rogers left the ring. Martinez walked over to Rogers, grabbed her by the spandex, and dragged her back into the ring.

On June 2, 2019, Martinez appeared for WAW at Fightmare III, held at Carrow Road (the home stadium of Norwich City), in a winning effort against Sweet Saraya to become the WAWW World Champion.

=== Women Superstars Uncensored (2007–2018) ===
In Women Superstars Uncensored (WSU) in 2007, Martinez began teaming with Angel Orsini. In March 2008, they began feuding that culminated in many grueling matches throughout 2008 into 2009, including a Steel Cage on January 10, 2009; 2 months later, Martinez defeated Orsini in a Bullrope match on March 7, 2009, at the Second Anniversary Show in Boonton, New Jersey to win the WSU Championship, ending Orsini's record reign of just over nine months. They had one more match that rewrote the record books in a 60-minute Iron Woman Match on June 6, 2009, in Boonton, New Jersey, that went a total of 70 minutes including going 10 minutes into sudden death and resulted in Mercedes getting the pin after a fisherwoman's buster and retaining the title. Martinez would continue to defend the title against the likes of Nikki Roxx, Awesome Kong, Rain, and Portia Perez. Along the way, Martinez and Orsini briefly captured the WSU Tag Team Championships. Martinez continued her WSU Championship title reign by defending against more challengers including Alicia, Amber O'Neal, Mickie James, and Jazz throughout 2009–2010. In January 2011, Martinez defeated Angel Orsini again in a ladder match to unify her title with Orsini's All Guts No Glory championship. Martinez then successfully defended her championship against Serena Deeb in the main event of WSU's 4 year anniversary show and also defeated Brittney Savage at WSU's Uncensored Rumble event. In August 2011, Mercedes put her title on the line against Uncensored Rumble winner, Lexxus in a match that would become the longest women's wrestling match in history as the match continued past the 60 minute time limit until Martinez was able to get the win after 73 minutes, breaking the record of the Orsini match by three minutes. Martinez then became involved in a violent rivalry with Jessicka Havok that culminated in Havok putting an end to Martinez's unprecedented three year title reign at the WSU 5th Anniversary Show.

On February 11, 2017, Martinez defeated Cherry Bomb to win the WSU Championship, making her the first ever three-time champion. She retained the title for over a year until June 16, 2018, when she lost the title against Tessa Blanchard.

=== WWE (2017–2018) ===
On July 13, 2017, Martinez entered WWE's Mae Young Classic tournament, defeating Xia Li in her first round match. The following day, Martinez defeated Princesa Sugehit in the second round and Abbey Laith in the quarterfinals, before being eliminated from the tournament in the semifinals by Shayna Baszler. She made an appearance on the October 26, 2017 episode of NXT, participating in a battle royal which was won by Nikki Cross to determine one of the contenders for the vacant NXT Women's Championship at NXT TakeOver: WarGames. Martinez would also lose to Ember Moon on the November 15, 2017 edition of NXT. Martinez made her return to WWE, competing in the 2nd Mae Young Classic. She made it to the second round, defeating Ashley Rayne before being eliminated by Meiko Satomura.

=== All Elite Wrestling (2019) ===
On August 31, 2019, Martinez appeared at All Elite Wrestling's second major pay-per-view event, All Out. She appeared as the "Joker" in the second Casino Battle Royale, coming into the match as its final entrant. She was eliminated by Britt Baker without scoring a single elimination. She made her return on November 5 at AEW Dark, teaming with Big Swole in a losing effort against Allie and Sadie Gibbs.

=== Return to WWE (2020–2021) ===
In January 2020, Martinez signed a contract with WWE and reported to the Performance Center. She was again assigned to the NXT brand, with her return match being a battle royal to determine the number one contender for the NXT Women's Championship on January 15, eliminating Mia Yim before being eliminated by Shayna Baszler. She also entered her first Royal Rumble match at the Royal Rumble 2020 event at Number 6, before being eliminated by Mandy Rose and Sonya Deville after lasting over eight minutes. On February 5, Martinez defeated Kacy Catanzaro in her return singles match, marking her first victory on NXT. On July 22 episode of NXT, Martinez signed with the Robert Stone Brand after attacking Shotzi Blackheart, turning heel in the process. On the September 8 episode of NXT, after losing to Rhea Ripley in a steel cage match, Robert Stone announced that she is no longer part of the Robert Stone Brand.

Martinez made her Raw debut on September 21, where she was revealed as a member of the villainous faction, Retribution under the ring name of Retaliation. Shortly thereafter, Martinez requested her removal from the group, and was quietly returned to NXT. Martinez made her return to NXT on December 23, attacking NXT Women's champion Io Shirai. She was in a triple threat along with Toni Storm at NXT TakeOver: Vengeance Day but failed to capture the championship. In June 2021, Martinez entered into a feud against Xia Li over beating her in the inaugural Mae Young Classic, losing to her in a match at NXT TakeOver: In Your House. On the June 29 episode of NXT, she teamed with Jake Atlas and lost to Li and Boa in a mixed tag team match. During the match, she suffered an injury after getting knocked out with a kick, and was taken to a hospital afterwards. On August 6, Martinez was released from her WWE contract.

=== Impact Wrestling (2021–2022) ===
On the October 7, 2021 episode of Impact!, Martinez made her debut, teaming with Savannah Evans and Tasha Steelz to defeat Brandi Lauren, Kimber Lee, and Lady Frost. At Knockouts Knockdown, Martinez defeated Brandi Lauren in the quarter-finals, Rachael Ellering in the semi-finals, and Tasha Steelz in the final to win the Knockouts Knockdown tournament, thus she received a future Impact Knockouts Championship match. Martinez received her championship match against Mickie James at Turning Point, where she was unsuccessful in capturing the title. On the January 6, 2022 episode of Impact!, Martinez lost to Deonna Purrazzo in what would be her final match in the company.

=== Return to AEW / ROH (2021–2026) ===
On the December 29, 2021 episode of Dynamite, Martinez made her return, assisting Jade Cargill in defeating Thunder Rosa to advance to the finals of the TBS Women's Championship. It was then announced via social media that she had signed with AEW. Martinez faced Rosa in the February 4, 2022, episode of Rampage, where she was disqualified due to hitting Rosa with a lead pipe. Afterwards, Martinez was confronted by the AEW Women's World Champion Dr. Britt Baker, D.M.D., with whom she had an agreement to take out Rosa, however, Baker claimed that Martinez had not done her part. This led to a No Disqualification match between Martinez and Rosa on the February 16 episode of Dynamite, which was won by Rosa. After the match, Rosa lifted Martinez's arm in sign of respect, however, was attacked by Baker's allies, Jamie Hayter and Rebel. Baker handed the pipe to Martinez to attack Rosa, but Martinez hesitated, which led Hayter to attack her from behind, turning Martinez face in the process.

On the March 2 episode of Dynamite, Martinez teamed up with Rosa to defeat Baker and Hayter in a tag team match. On the March 11 episode of Rampage, Martinez lost to Hayter after an interference by Baker. After the match, Baker alongside Hayter and Rebel tried to attack Martinez, which was prevented by Rosa. Following that, Martinez transitioned to Ring of Honor, where she would become the ROH Women's World Champion, and would remain the champion until losing it to Athena on December 10 at Final Battle. On March 30, 2022, AEW president Tony Khan, who had purchased Ring of Honor one month prior, announced that Martinez would face Willow Nightingale on April 1 at Supercard of Honor XV for the Interim ROH Women's World Championship, with the winner facing lineal champion Deonna Purrazzo at a later date. Martinez would go onto defeat Nightingale to claim the interim ROH Women's World Championship. On the May 4, 2022 episode of Dynamite, she defeated Purrazzo to become the undisputed ROH Women's World Champion. She has since successfully defended the ROH Women's World Championship on episodes of AEW Dark: Elevation. On the November 18 episode of Rampage, Martinez returned from an injury to stop Athena attacking Madison Rayne after their match. On December 10, at Final Battle, Martinez lost the title to Athena, ending her reign at 220 days.

After five-month of hiatus, Martinez made her return on the May 18, 2023, episode of ROH on Honor Club, where she defeated Ashley D'Amboise. On the June 9, 2023, episode of Rampage, Martinez made her first AEW appearance since November 2022, by competing in a four-way to determine the number one contender for the AEW Women's World Championship, which was won by Skye Blue.

On February 14, 2024, Mercedes Martinez entered the inaugural ROH Women's World Television Championship tournament and defeated Trish Adora in the first round to advance. On the March 7, 2024 tapings of ROH during the second round of the ROH Women's World Television Championship tournament Mercedes defeated Abadon to advance. On the March 16, 2024 tapings of ROH during the semifinals of the tournament Marcedes Martinez faced Billie Starkz but was not successful.

In January 2026, it was reported that Martinez's AEW contract had expired and was not renewed, ending her over four-year tenure with the promotion.

On August 27, 2026, Martinez announced her retirement from professional wrestling after suffering a torn ACL during an independent show on August 15, ending her 26-year career.

== Personal life ==
In July 2019, Benitez announced during an interview with NowThis News that she is openly lesbian. She was married and has one child, a boy, born in 2008.

Martinez has asthma.

She has stated that Bret Hart is her favorite wrestler of all time.

== Championships and accomplishments ==
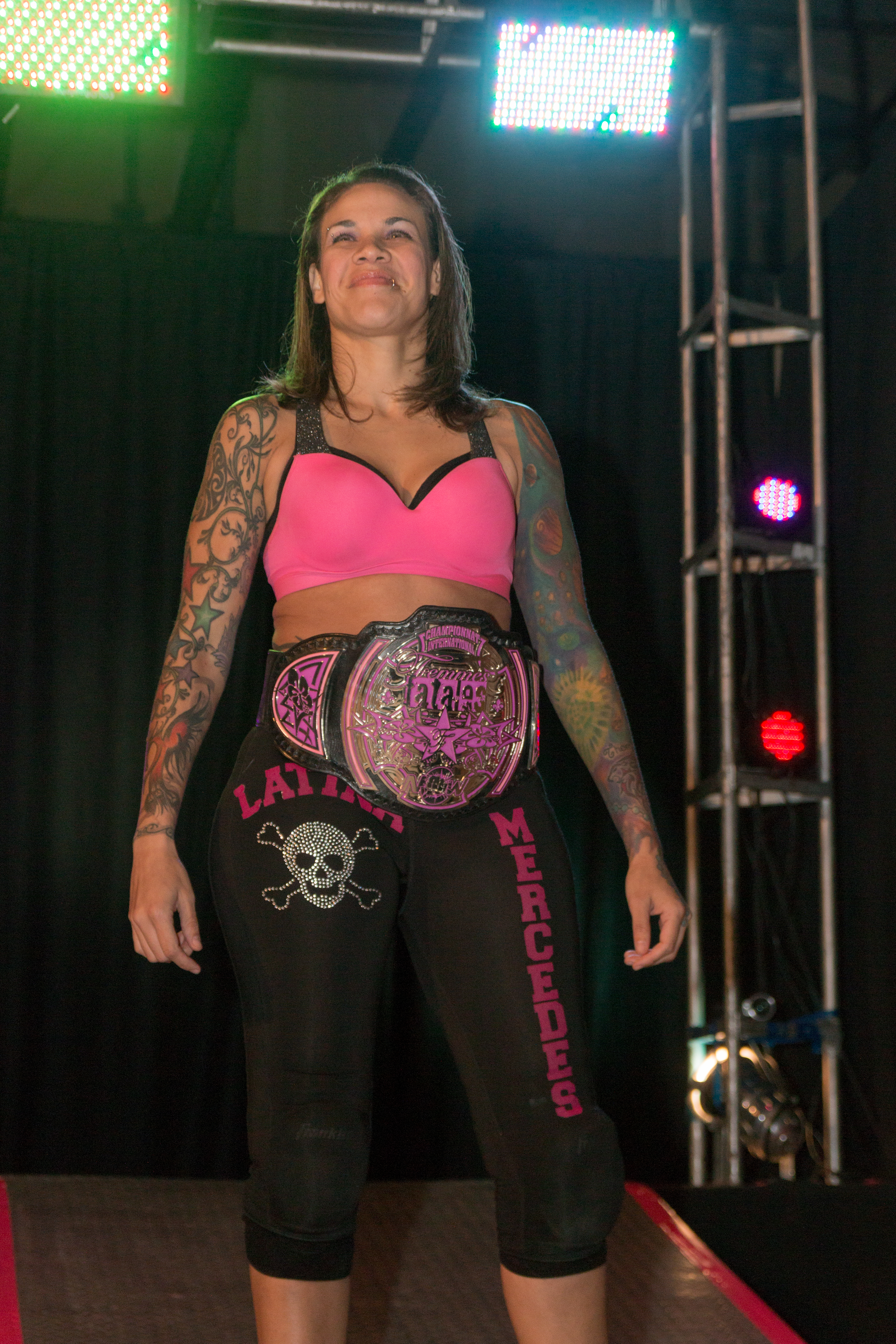
Martinez is a record three-time Femmes Fatales Champion.

- Alternative Wrestling Show
  - AWS Heavyweight Championship (1 time, final)
- Bellatrix Female Warriors
  - Bellatrix World Championship (1 time)
- Defiant Pro Wrestling
  - DPW Women's Championship (1 time)
- Femmes Fatales
  - Femmes Fatales Championship (3 times)
- Green Mountain Wrestling
  - GMW Women's Championship (2 times)
- Impact Wrestling
  - Knockouts Knockdown Tournament (2021)
- Independent Wrestling Association Mid-South
  - IWA Mid-South Women's Championship (1 time)
- IndyGurlz Championship Wrestling
  - IndyGurlz Championship (1 time, inaugural, final)
  - IndyGurlz Australia Championship (2 times)
  - IndyGurlz Title Tournament (2010)
- Indie Wrestling Hall of Fame
  - Class of 2024
- New England Championship Wrestling
  - NECW World Women's Championship (1 time)
- New Horizon Pro Wrestling
  - Global Conflict Shield Tournament (2014, 2016)
- Pride Of Wrestling
  - POW Women's Championship (1 time)
- Pennsylvania Premiere Wrestling
  - PPW Women's Championship (1 time)
- Pro Wrestling Illustrated
  - Ranked No. 2 of the top 50 female wrestlers in the PWI Female 50 in 2011
- Pro Wrestling Unplugged
  - PWU Women's Championship (3 times)
- Unify Championship Entertainment
  - Kaimana Women's Championship (1 time)
- Ring of Honor
  - ROH Women's World Championship (1 time)
  - Interim ROH Women's World Championship (1 time)
- Rising Stars Women's Wrestling
  - Rising Stars Women's Championship (1 time)
- Rise Wrestling
  - Phoenix of Rise Championship (1 time)
  - RISE Year-End Awards (4 times)
    - Match of the Year (2018) vs. Tessa Blanchard in a 75-minute iron woman match on RISE 10: Insanity
    - Moment of The Year (2018) – Martinez and Blanchard set a new world record at RISE 10, the longest one on one women's wrestling match in history at 75 Minutes
    - Wrestler of The Year (2018)
    - Match of the Year (2019) vs. Kylie Rae in a no ropes submission match on RISE 13: Legendary
- Shimmer Women Athletes
  - Shimmer Championship (2 time)
  - Shimmer Tag Team Championship (1 time) – with Cheerleader Melissa
- Shine Wrestling
  - Shine Championship (1 time)
  - Shine Nova Championship (1 time)
  - Shine Tag Team Championship (1 time) – with Ivelisse
- Sports Illustrated
  - Ranked No. 10 of the top 10 women's wrestlers in 2019
- Test Of Strength Wrestling
  - TOS Women's Championship (1 time)
- VIP Wrestling
  - VIP Women's Championship (1 time, inaugural)
- Women Superstars Uncensored
  - All Guts, No Glory Championship (1 time)
  - WSU Championship (3 time)
  - WSU Tag Team Championship (1 time) – with Angel Orsini
  - J-Cup (2008)
  - WSU/NWS King and Queen of the Ring (2011) – with Julio Dinero
  - WSU Hall of Fame (Class of 2017)
- World Xtreme Wrestling
  - WXW Cruiserweight Championship (1 time)
  - WXW Women's Championship (5 times)
  - Elite 8 Tournament (2006, 2008)
  - WXW Hall of Fame (Class of 2014)
- Women's Wrestling Hall of Fame
  - Class of 2025
- WrestleCrap
  - Gooker Award (2020) – as part of Retribution
