= Traci Brooks =

Canadian professional wrestler

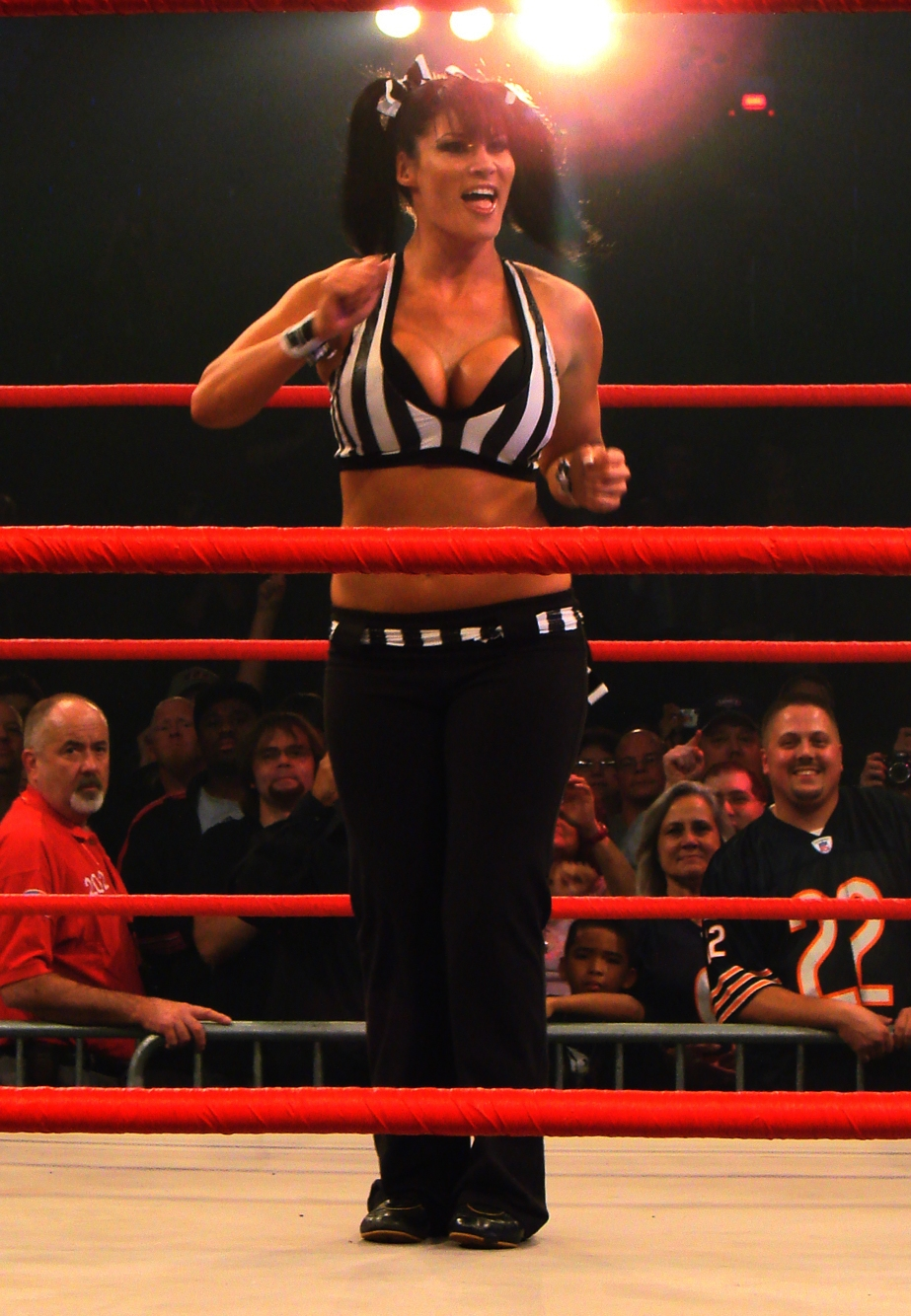
- Brookshaw in 2008 at TNA Bound for Glory IV, as a special guest referee

Personal information
- Born: Tracy Brookshaw; May 22, 1975 (age 51) St. Marys, Ontario, Canada
- Spouse: Frankie Kazarian (m. 2010)
- Children: 1

Professional wrestling career
- Ring name(s): Miss Apocalypse; Ms. Brooks; Traci; Traci Brooks; Tracy; Tracy Brooks; Tracy Brookshaw
- Billed height: 5 ft 4 in (1.63 m)
- Billed weight: 127 lb (58 kg)
- Billed from: Toronto, Ontario, Canada; Wall Street in Manhattan, New York; St. Marys, Ontario, Canada
- Trained by: Ron Hutchinson; Rob Etcheverria
- Debut: 2001
- Retired: February 25, 2012

Tracy Brookshaw (born May 22, 1975) is a Canadian retired professional wrestler and ring valet, best known for her first tenure with Total Nonstop Action Wrestling (TNA), where she performed under the ring name Traci Brooks from 2003 to 2010.

Brookshaw was inducted into the TNA Hall of Fame as part of the Class of 2023. Regarded by TNA as the promotion's "original Knockout", as she joined the company before the establishment of the dedicated Knockouts division in 2007, making her one of the promotion's earliest and most prominent female performers.

== Early life ==
Brookshaw grew up on a pig and chicken farm in St. Marys, Ontario. In 2000, she won the Toronto Sunshine Millennium Calendar contest which led to her being named Miss June 2000 and interviewed in the Toronto Sun. Brookshaw went on to engage in promotional modeling work with the Molson, Labatt and Budweiser beverage brewers.

In her interview, Brookshaw said that she aspired to be "the next WWF Superstar". This led to her being introduced to Ron Hutchison, a professional wrestler who operated the Sully's Gym professional wrestling school out of Toronto, Ontario. Brookshaw began training under Hutchinson in March 2000 and debuted in January 2001 as "Tracy Brooks".

== Professional wrestling career ==
=== Independent circuit (2001-2003) ===
Brooks appeared with numerous independent promotions, including Border City Wrestling and the Apocalypse Wrestling Federation (AWF). During her time in AWF, she worked a program feuding with La Felina and was managed for a short time by Canadian hip-hop artist, Dan-e-o. On August 30, 2001, Brookshaw (as Miss Apocalypse) defeated Joey Knight to win the AWF heavyweight title.

Brookshaw continued to work for independent promotions, including Blood Sweat and Ears in her home region in Southern Ontario and, most prominently, NWA Cyberspace where she contended for the NWA Cyberspace Women's Championship. Brookshaw also wrestled in independent custom wrestling matches against wrestlers like Amber O'Neal and Christie Ricci.

=== Total Nonstop Action Wrestling (2003-2012) ===
==== Early appearances (2003) ====
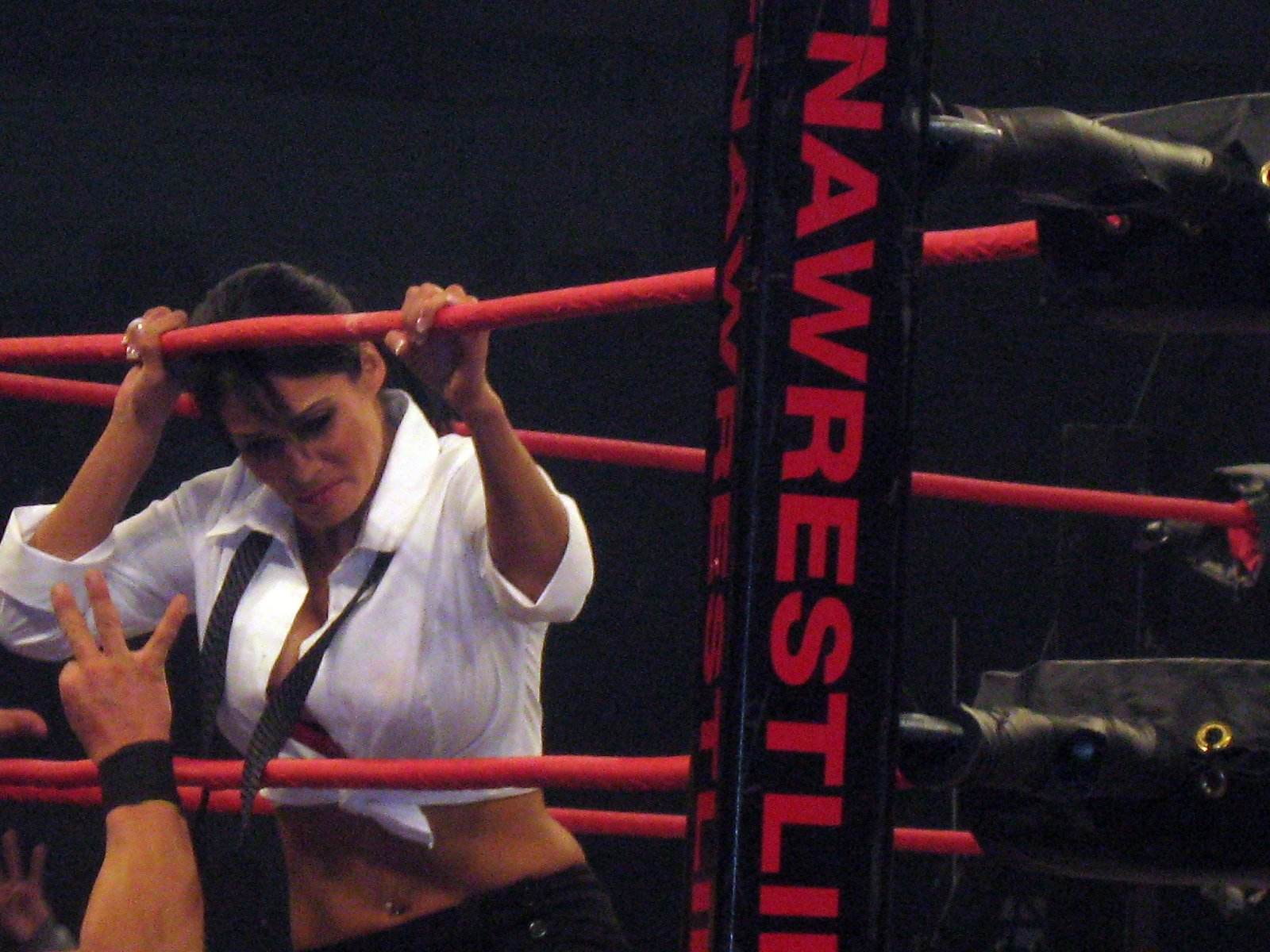
Brooks at a TNA event

Brooks debuted in Total Nonstop Action Wrestling on April 30, 2003, in Catholic schoolgirl apparel, attacking Lollipop, a dancer who entertained the live audience during intermissions. The following week, Brooks demanded to be entered in a gauntlet match in which the winner would receive a shot at the NWA World Heavyweight Championship, threatening to sue National Wrestling Alliance official Bill Behrens for sexual discrimination if he did not comply. When her threats failed, Brooks instead attempted to charm Behrens into allowing her into the match. Behrens then placed Brooks in a triple threat match with fellow female wrestlers Desire and Trinity, with the winner gaining entry into the gauntlet match. After Kid Kash ambushed Trinity and David Young accidentally punched Desire, Brooks won the match. Later that evening, she was attacked by Lollipop as she approached the ring to enter the gauntlet match. After she entered the ring, Brooks was quickly pinned and eliminated by Kid Kash.

On May 21, Brooks was paired with David Young in an "Anarchy Alliance" tag team tournament to determine the number one contenders to the NWA World Tag Team Championship. They defeated Kid Kash and Trinity on May 21 and Ron Killings (whose partner, Don Harris, had refused to team with him) on June 4. During the match, Brooks was injured by Killings. Nurse Veronica (who had recently debuted in an on-air role as TNA's backstage clinician) rushed to the ring to aid Brooks. During this time, Brooks was also involved in catfights with Young's valet, Desire. Brooks and Young then faced America's Most Wanted in the tournament final, but lost. After the match, Young threatened Brooks, but she was again saved by Veronica.

During an interview with Goldy Locks, Brooks and Veronica announced that TNA officials would no longer allow women to compete against men; however, they would continue to work together as a stable named Bitchslap. The duo then issued an open challenge to any women in attendance. TNA cage dancers April Pennington and Lollipop (who was attacked by Brooks several weeks earlier) accepted the challenge. They tried attacking Brooks and Veronica but were stopped by TNA security guards. The following week, Lollipop challenged Bitchslap to a match. Veronica (without Brooks present) accepted, but was attacked by both Lollipop and Pennington until TNA security again stopped the catfight. Veronica then replaced Brooks with a new partner, Cheerleader Valentina (who had earlier competed as JV Love on TNA Xplosion in a match against Brooks). The reason for the replacement is because Brooks was unable to travel from Canada to the TNA taping. The storyline with Bitchslap was eventually dropped because TNA didn't have enough female wrestlers to compete against the group, and Veronica turned down a two-year contract with TNA, instead attempting to sign with either WWE or a company in Japan. Brooks was removed from television for repackaging, Trinity was placed into other storylines, and TNA stopped booking Valentina.

==== Relationship with Michael Shane (2003–2006) ====
Brooks returned to TNA on November 5, 2003, helping Shane Douglas defeat The Sandman. On November 26, Douglas and Brooks, known now simply as "Traci", helped Michael Shane defeat Sonjay Dutt. Following the match, the trio celebrated, and Douglas announced that they were to be called "The New Franchise".

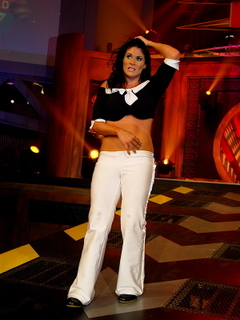
Brooks entering the arena at a TNA event

The New Franchise began feuding with Triple X (Christopher Daniels, Low Ki and Elix Skipper). The feud lasted until April 21, 2004, when Shane lost to Daniels after he passed up on a pinfall opportunity in order to try to hit his finisher. After Douglas admonished Shane, Shane began pushing and slapping his erstwhile mentor. Traci eventually grabbed Douglas from behind, enabling Shane to superkick Douglas. The following week, Traci helped Shane defeat Douglas in a singles match.

Traci continued to manage Shane, who was by now pursuing the X Division Championship. Shane proved unable to defeat the incumbent champion, A.J. Styles, so he and Traci recruited Frankie Kazarian in order to maximize their numbers advantage. The result was a new stable/tag team that was known by fans as Shazarian. After several weeks of confrontations, Styles defended his title against Shane and Kazarian in a three way Ultimate X match on July 28, 2004. Though he was able to nullify the interference of Traci by giving her a Styles Clash, he was eventually knocked unconscious by the combined efforts of Shane and Kazarian. Shane and Kazarian then climbed for the X Division Championship, and simultaneously retrieved the belt, thus becoming co-champions. They lost the titles to Petey Williams in a Gauntlet Match on August 11.

In late 2004, Traci turned into a fan favorite by leaving Shane and Kazarian and becoming the assistant of the TNA Director of Authority, Dusty Rhodes. Trinity also wanted to be Rhodes' assistant, however, so he told each woman to recruit a new tag team. The teams faced one another at Destination X on March 13, 2005, with the winning team's manager becoming Rhodes' sole assistant. Traci's team (Don and Ron Harris, the Disciples of Destruction) defeated Trinity's team (Big Tilly and Bruno Sassi - Phi Delta Slam), making her Rhodes' assistant. Traci eventually left Rhodes' side and began managing Chris Sabin, who was feuding with Michael Shane and Trinity. At Lockdown on April 24, she tried to prevent Trinity from interfering in a four way X Division Xscape elimination match between Sabin, Sonjay Dutt, Shocker and Shane, but failed. The feud continued until Hard Justice on May 15, when Sabin and Traci lost to Shane and Trinity. In the course of the match, Traci turned on Sabin and Shane turned on Trinity, with Traci aligning herself with Shane once again and Trinity siding with Sabin.

Traci began managing Shane once again and stayed with him when he changed his name to his real name, Matt Bentley. When Bentley sat out during contract renegotiations in August 2005, she did some interview work for TNA. At Unbreakable on September 11, Traci acted as a backstage interviewer throughout the event. She returned to Bentley's side after his return at Unbreakable. In February 2006, Bentley turned heel and began a dispute with longtime tag partner Lance Hoyt. Following the feud, Bentley was sidelined with an injury. Traci did promotional work for the company during the downtime.

On the May 15 taping of Impact!, she wrestled Gail Kim in the first woman's match in over a year. The match was taped purely for the forthcoming TNA Knockouts DVD, not for the Spike TV program. Kim gained the pin after interference from America's Most Wanted. At Hardcore War she defeated Kim with Christy Hemme as referee.

==== Managing Robert Roode (2006–2008) ====
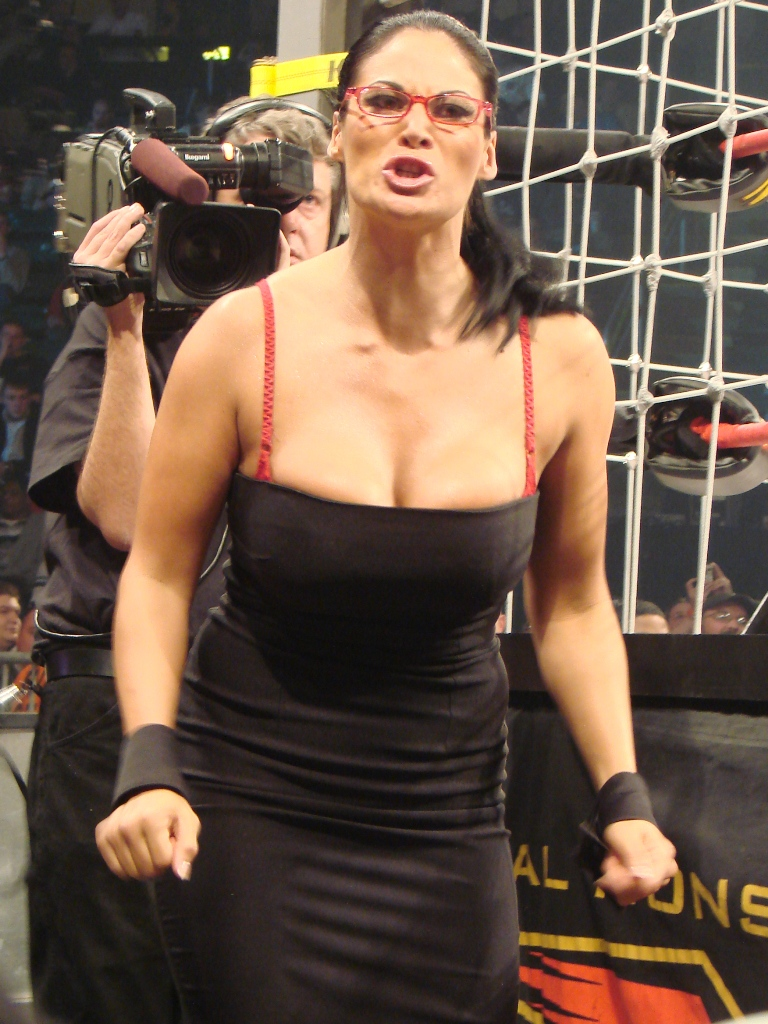
The "Chief Executive Offender", Ms. Brooks, at Lockdown

Traci was announced as Robert Roode's manager at Bound for Glory 2006 and changed her name to "Ms. Brooks," thus becoming a villain. She managed him during the Fight for the Right Tournament at the October 28 Impact!. She lost to Eric Young in a bikini contest at Turning Point. After this, she was told to sign Young to a contract- no matter what it took to do it. In the storyline, Ms. Brooks began to pressure him into having sex with her. Finally, at Against All Odds Ms. Brooks successfully seduced Young into signing a contract with "Robert Roode Inc.". After sometime without a storyline, she entered a rivalry with Gail Kim and was defeated at an Impact! taping. At Slammiversary, she was taken out by Kim once again.

On the August 23, 2007, episode of Impact!, Roode wrestled Gail Kim, with Kim pinning Roode after a low blow leg drop. Following the match, Roode, unhappy at his loss, continued to attack Kim until Kaz came out to counter Roode. On the September 27 edition of Impact. Tracy competed in 5-way match in losing effort to Roxxi Laveau. On the October 4 edition of Impact!, it was revealed that Brooks and Roode were not romantically linked, and that the only reason she continued to take Roode's abuse was to help her sick mother. Subsequently, on Impact! and at Genesis a female fan held up signs asking Roode to replace Ms. Brooks with her. Roode then joined the Angle Alliance with Ms. Brooks begrudgingly by his side. At the Genesis pay-per-view on November 11, 2007, Traci fainted due to heat exhaustion, but appeared to be doing fine following help from medics. However, news reports have arisen that claim that her fainting was staged, as Brooks was asked to do so by Vince Russo. At the January 10 Impact! tapings, Roode fired Ms. Brooks and replaced her with the female fan, identified by Roode as Ms. Payton Banks. Shortly thereafter, Brookshaw reverted to a crowd favorite and to her "'Traci Brooks" ring name and began feuding with Banks. She defeated Banks at the annual pay-per-view, Against All Odds. On the April 3 edition of Impact!, Traci defeated Payton Banks after a facebuster from the top turnbuckle. At Lockdown, She participated in the first ever "Queen of the Cage" match which was won by Roxxi Laveaux. At Sacrifice, Traci participated in the first ever TNA Knockout Makeover Battle Royal, which was won by Gail Kim.

==== Knockout Law (2008) ====
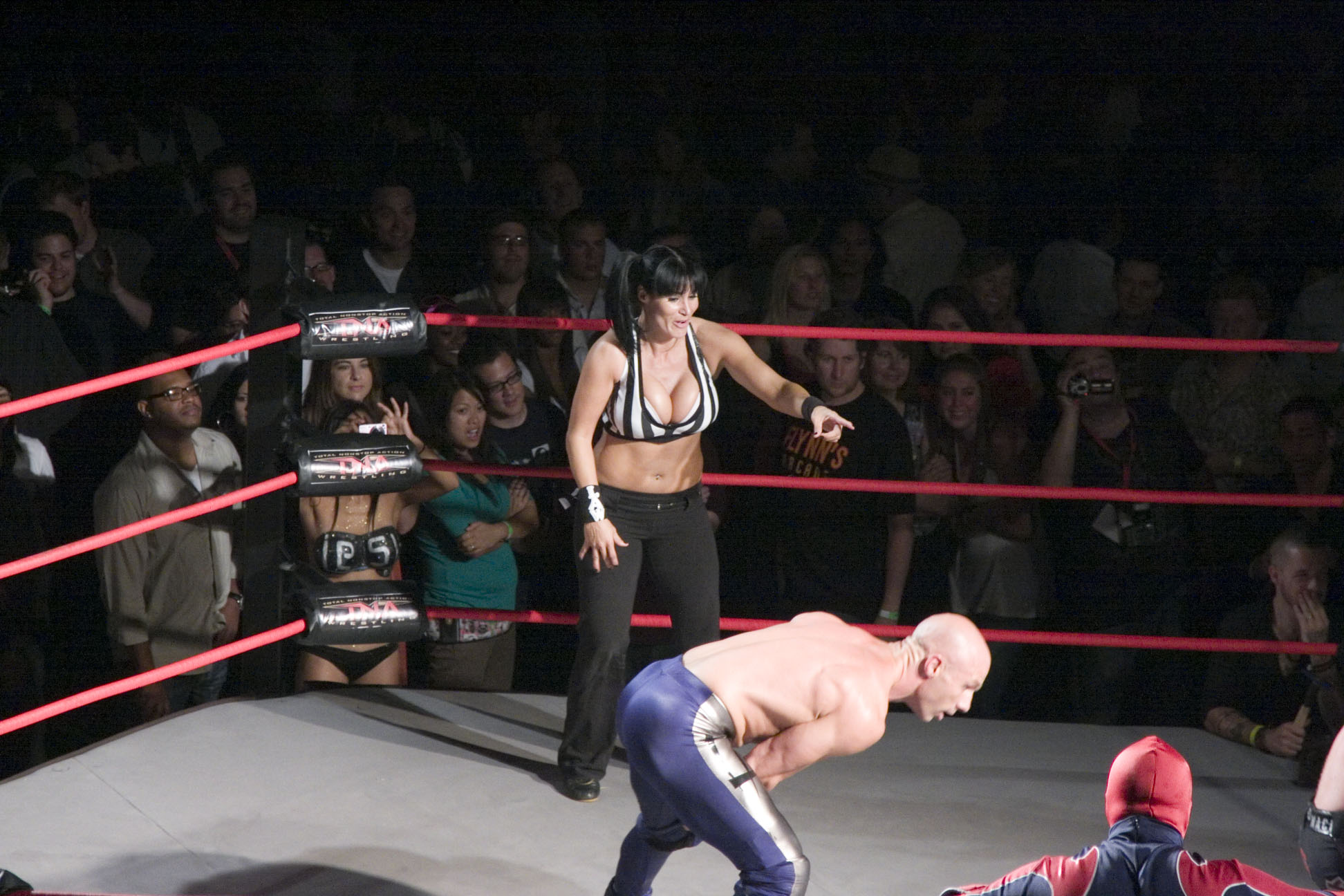
Brooks as a referee in a match between The Motor City Machineguns and Suicide & Daniels

During the July 17 edition of Impact! a backstage segment revealed that Brooks was in talks with Jim Cornette about something concerning the Knockouts. Soon after on the August 7 episode of Impact!, Brooks was the special guest referee for a match between Roxxi and Jacqueline, which Roxxi won. In August 2008, Cornette announced that Traci officially is in charge of the Knockouts Division, known as the "Knockout Law". In January 2009, Traci stopped appearing in TNA and Jim Cornette resumed control over the Knockout division. She returned on the March 12, 2009, edition of Impact! as a referee.

==== Return as a wrestler (2009–2010) ====
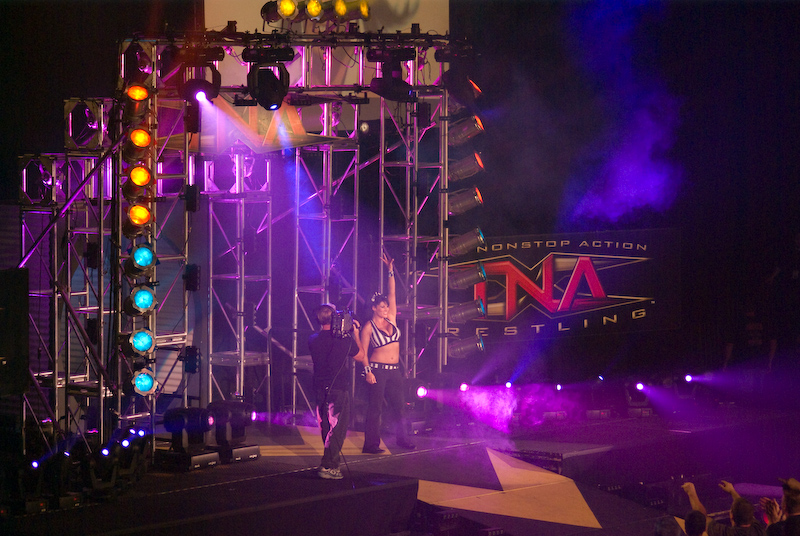
Brooks at Bound for Glory

Traci returned to television on the July 23, 2009, episode of Impact!. During an interview with Lauren, she announced that had taken time off TNA to work on some projects in Hollywood and she was returning as the referee for a Knockout battle royal later that evening. The winner of the battle royal would receive $50,000 and spot in The Main Event Mafia. As the match wound down to Tara and Awesome Kong as the final two participants, Brooks revealed that she was actually a participant in the match and tossed both women out of the ring. Upon winning the match, Traci turned villainous and became a member of the Main Event Mafia. On the following Impact, Traci cemented herself as a villainess during an interview with Lauren in which she denounced TNA for not giving her a spot on television, explaining her absence. On August 27 episode of Impact, Traci competed in the TNA Knockout Tag Title tournament teaming with Sharmell to represent The Main Event Mafia, but they lost in the first round of the tournament to Awesome Kong and Raisha Saeed. On the October 1 edition of Impact!, Traci was defeated by Christy Hemme in a "Battle of the Playboy Models" match. After the match, the villainous Traci attacked Christy. The following episode of Impact, Brooks teamed up with Alissa Flash and The Beautiful People (Velvet Sky and Madison Rayne) to defeat Taylor Wilde, Sarita, Hemme and Hamada in an elimination match.

On the October 22 edition of Impact! the Main Event Mafia disbanded. On the November 12 episode of Impact, Traci began a rivalry with the villainous Alissa Flash when she attacked Flash after losing to her in a singles match. On the November 19 episode of Impact, Traci attacked Flash after she lost to Sarita, In the process, Traci cemented herself as a face. On the November 26 edition of Impact!, Traci competed in a number 1 contenders battle royal to face ODB for the Knockouts Championship at Final Resolution but failed to win after being eliminated by Wilde and Sarita. On March 4, 2010, Brookshaw was released from her contract.

==== Various feuds and departure (2011–2012) ====
On February 14, 2011, at the tapings of the February 17 edition of Impact!, Brooks made a one night return to TNA, saving her real life husband Kazarian from Robbie E and Cookie. On April 7, Brooks wrestled at TNA house show in Erie, Pennsylvania, unsuccessfully challenging Madison Rayne for the TNA Women's Knockout Championship. Two days later Brooks defeated Rayne in a non-title match at a house show in Cleveland Ohio. On the July 21 edition of Impact Wrestling, Brooks made her return to TNA, saving Velvet Sky and Mickie James from ODB and Jacqueline. On the August 18 edition of Impact Wrestling, Brooks re-applied for the job of "Knockout Law". However, on the September 1 edition of Impact Wrestling, the job was given to Karen Jarrett, who then hired Brooks as her executive assistant. On the December 8 edition of Impact Wrestling, Brooks returned to the ring to face Jarrett's ally Gail Kim. Despite being told to lay down, Brooks decided to fight back, but eventually lost following interference from Madison Rayne. After Karen Jarrett was fired from TNA on the December 15 edition of Impact Wrestling, Brooks began wrestling more regularly, feuding with Madison Rayne. On the January 5, 2012, edition of Impact Wrestling, Brooks and Mickie James failed to capture the TNA Knockouts Tag Team Championship from Rayne and Gail Kim. This turned out to be Brooks's Final match in TNA. After months of inactivity, Brooks announced on April 17, that she had been released from TNA.

=== Return to independent circuit (2010–2011) ===
Brooks made her debut for Women Superstars Uncensored, on November 28, 2008, defeating Annie Social in singles competition. On the March 6, 2010, where she lost to April Hunter, following the match, Traci saved Hunter from an attack from The Boston Shore. On the April 10 episode of WSU, Traci unsuccessfully challenged Brittany Savage for WSU Spirit Championship.

On July 18, 2015, Brooks made a sporadic professional wrestling appearance for House of Hardcore (HOH), managing Frankie Kazarian and Christopher Daniels to a win over The Kingdom (Matt Taven and Michael Bennett).

=== Part-time appearances and TNA Hall of fame induction (2022–present) ===
Brooks made a brief return to Impact on June 19, 2022, at Slammiversary 2022. Brooks was seen ringside supporting her husband Frankie Kazarian his 10-man tag team match. She would get involved, taking out Maria Kanellis-Bennett with a clothesline. Brooks made another return to Impact at Slammiversary 2023 when she managed Kazarian his match with Eddie Edwards. Later in the match, Brooks took out Edwards' wife Alisha in the ring as she tried to get involved in the match. On the July 20 episode of Impact! Brooks and Alisha brawled backstage. The two husband-and-wife teams would mace a mixed-tag match at tapings for the 1000th episode of Impact!, with Brooks and Kazarian winning the match. After the match, it was announced that Brooks would be inducted into the Impact Hall of Fame at that year's Bound for Glory. On October 21, 2023, Traci was inducted into the Impact Hall of Fame.

== Other media ==
Brookshaw appeared in the film Zombie King and the Legion of Doom (2003) as "Tracy the Sexy Killer Zombie", as well as a stunt double. Brookshaw also appeared in the Canadian comedy series Kenny vs. Spenny (2003) in the episode "Who Is The Strongest?" (alongside fellow wrestler Angel Williams), as well as the series Rent a Goalie (2008) as "Eva" in the episode "Eva has a dot dot dot".

On July 26, 2009, it was revealed that TNA had signed a deal with Playboy making Brooks the first TNA Knockout to ever pose for Playboy. On September 2 it was reported that Playboy had decided not to publish Brooks' photo shoot in the magazine. The photo shoot was instead released through their Cyber Club on September 17, 2009.

== Personal life ==
Brookshaw married fellow TNA wrestler Frank Gerdelman, better known as Frankie Kazarian, on January 7, 2010; they started dating in 2006 when she acted as his manager. The couple have a son together.

In an October 2008 interview with the Chicago Sun-Times, Brookshaw revealed that she suffered from Erb's palsy as an infant as a side-effect of her birth. While she recovered for the most part, due to aggressive treatment, she noted that she has impaired function in her right arm which affected her in the ring. She has said that "I don't have a biceps or a triceps. I have a uniceps."

== Championships and accomplishments ==
- 3X Wrestling
  - 3XW Women's Championship (1 time)
- All Star Championship Wrestling
  - Justice Cup (2005)
- Apocalypse Wrestling Federation
  - AWF Heavyweight Championship (1 time)
- Coastal Championship Wrestling
  - CCW Women's Championship (1 time)
- CyberSpace Wrestling Federation
  - CWF His and Hers Tag Team Championship (1 time) – with Michael Shane
- Downsouth Championship Wrestling
  - DCW Women's Championship (1 time)
- Great Lakes Championship Wrestling
  - GLCW Women's Championship (1 time)
- New Ohio Championship Wrestling
  - NOCW Women's Championship (1 time)
- Pro Wrestling Illustrated
  - Ranked No. 22 of the top 50 female wrestlers in the PWI Female 50 in 2008
- RingDivas Women's Wrestling
  - RingDivas World Championship (1 time)
- Southern Championship Wrestling
  - SCW Women's Championship (1 time)
- Total Nonstop Action/Impact Wrestling
  - TNA Hall of Fame (2023)
  - TNA Year End Awards (1 time)
    - Babe of the Year (2004)
- Women's Wrestling Alliance
  - WWA Women's Championship (1 time)
  - Super J Tournament (2005)
- World Xtreme Wrestling
  - WXW Women's Elite 8 Tournament (2002)
  - WXW Hall of Fame (Class of 2013)
