= Trinity (wrestler) =

American professional wrestler (born 1971)

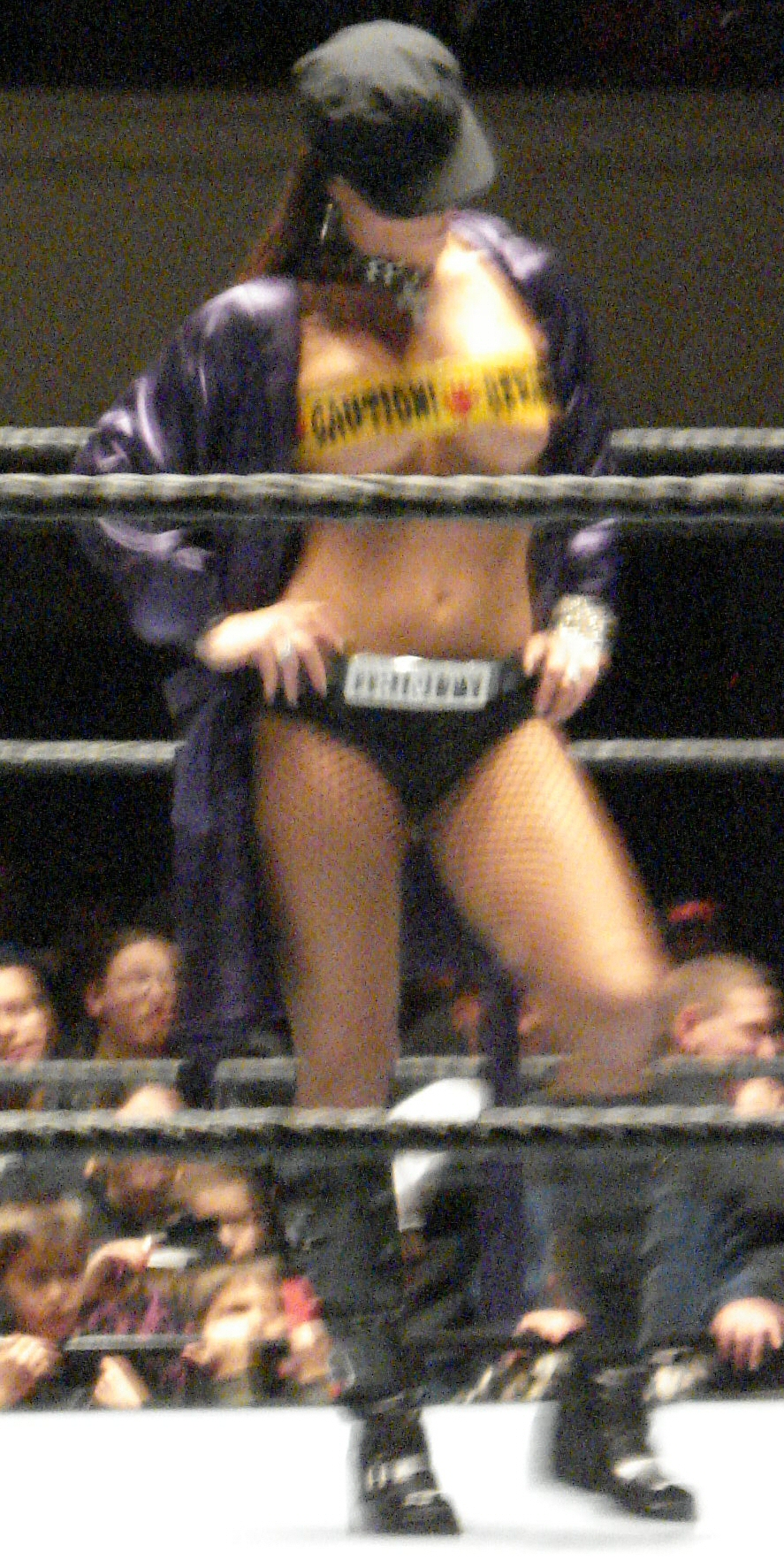
- Finochio, as Trinity, in 2006.

Personal information
- Born: Stephanie Finochio; December 1, 1971 (age 54) New York City, U.S.
- Education: Dowling College

Professional wrestling career
- Ring name(s): American Power; Italian Finesse; Starfire; Stephanie Starr; Stephanie Trinity; Trinity; Untamable Spirit
- Billed height: 5 ft 7 in (1.70 m)
- Billed weight: 130 lb (59 kg)
- Billed from: Long Island, New York
- Trained by: Chris Bassett; Chris Divine; The S.A.T. Mikey Whipwreck
- Debut: October 10, 2002
- Retired: June 22, 2007

Stephanie Finochio (born December 1, 1971) is an American stuntwoman, actress and former professional wrestler and valet. She is known for her appearances with NWA Total Nonstop Action and World Wrestling Entertainment under the ring name Trinity.

== Professional wrestling career ==
=== Early career (2002–2005) ===
After completing her training, Finochio made her professional wrestling debut on October 10, 2002 without using her surname, where she lost to Phoenix. On October 13, Finochio, now using the ring name "Stephanie Trinity", defeated Simply Luscious to win her first professional wrestling match. On October 26, Finochio made her Chikara debut under the ring name Stephanie Starr, where she lost to Mercedes Martinez. On November 1, Trinity lost to Luscious in a rematch. On January 17, 2003, Trinity wrestled against NWA Canadian Women's Champion Bam Bam Bambi for the title, but was defeated.

On September 13, Trinity defeated April Hunter to win the vacant CSWF Women's Championship. Trinity made her first title defense on February 21, 2004, against Ariel, where she was successful in retaining the title. On August 28, 2004, Trinity lost the title to Hunter in a four-way match also involving Ariel and Tracy Brooks, ending her reign at 350 days.

On May 13, 2005, Trinity competed at the Queens of Chaos' debut event, where she competed in a battle royal to determine the promotion's inaugural World Championship, which was ultimately won by Nikita.

=== NWA Total Nonstop Action (2002–2005) ===
On November 20, 2002, Finochio made her Total Nonstop Action Wrestling debut as "Trinity", as a valet to debuting tag team Divine Storm against E. Z. Money and Sonny Siaki. She made a few more appearances in this role. After a short hiatus, on January 27, 2003, she made her wrestling debut as "Stephanie Trinity" where she and Kid Kash defeated Desire and Sonny Siaki in a mixed tag team match. Trinity then defeated Desire in a singles match on February 5 before later defeating ODB on February 26. On March 19, Trinity became the second woman in TNA history to compete for one of the promotion's male championships, as she wrestled against Kid Kash and Amazing Red in a three-way match for Kash's X Division Championship, but was unable to win the title. In June, Trinity turned heel by choking out Goldylocks backstage, and would solidify her heel turn by aligning with Vince Russo the following week. In April 2004, Finochio formed the New York Connection (NYC) alongside Glenn Gilbertti, Vito LoGrasso, and Johnny Swinger. The NYC had their first match together on April 28, where Trinity, Gilbertti, and Swinger lost to Desire, Pat Kenney, and Sonny Siaki before losing a rematch on June 3 in a dark match before the inaugural episode of Impact!. Trinity then began feuding with Desire, and proceeded to defeat her in a stretcher match on June 23 and then again in a mixed tag team match on July 7 to end the feud. At the inaugural Victory Road pay-per-view on November 7, 2004, the evil Trinity defeated Jacqueline Moore in an open challenge.

After the NYC disbanded, Trinity entered into an angle with Tracy Brooks and TNA's Director of Authority Dusty Rhodes over the position of Rhodes' personal assistant. Brooks eventually won the job after her team of The Disciples of Destruction defeated Trinity's team, Phi Delta Slam, at the inaugural Destination X pay-per-view on March 13, 2005. Trinity then became the manager of Michael Shane and resumed her feud with Brooks, who became the manager of Chris Sabin. At the inaugural Hard Justice pay-per-view, Trinity and Shane were defeated by Brooks and Sabin after Brooks turned on Sabin and Shane turned on Trinity.

=== World Wrestling Entertainment (2005–2007) ===
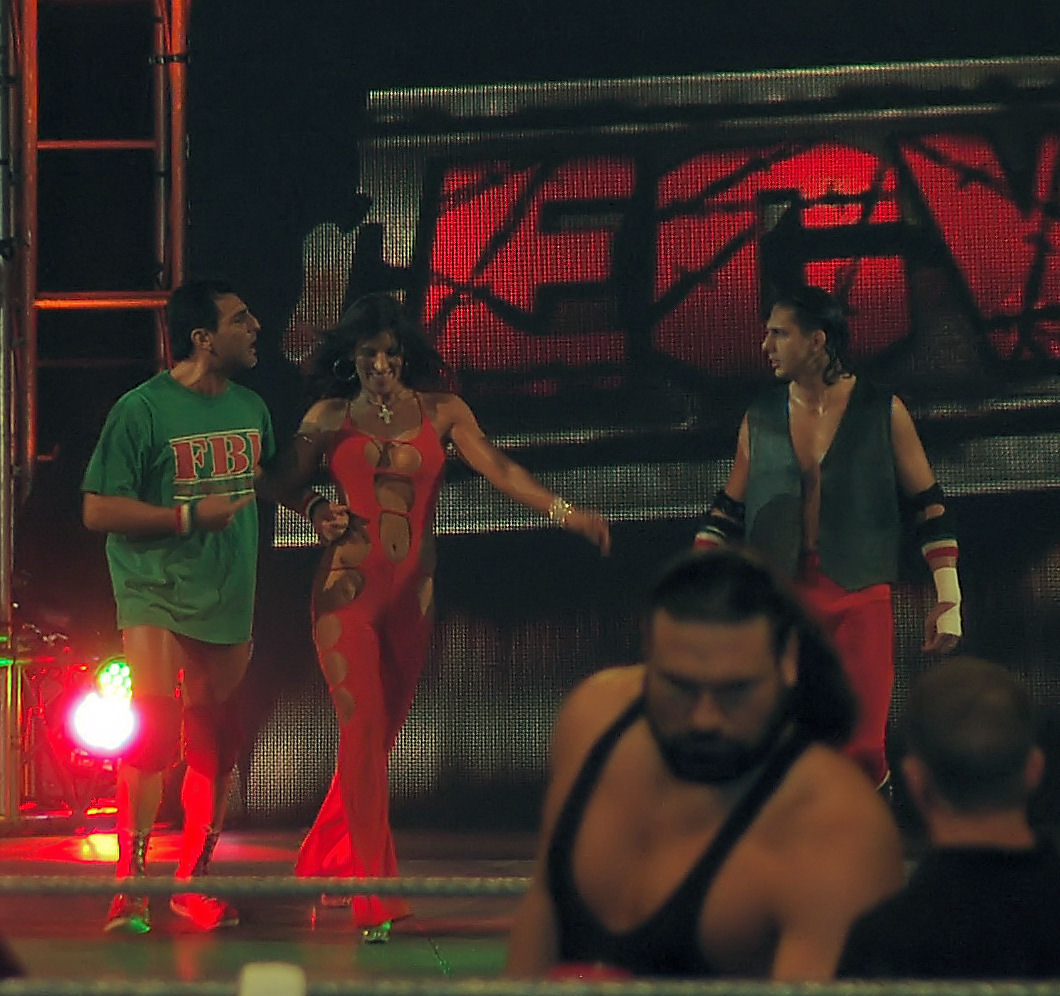
The Full Blooded Italians: Little Guido (left), Trinity (middle) and Tony Mamaluke (right) in 2006

After leaving TNA, Finochio received a try-out match with World Wrestling Entertainment (WWE), where she and Chris Cage lost to Beth Phoenix and Aaron Stevens on November 9, 2005. After appearing on the January 6, 2006 episode of Heat alongside Talia Madison in a segment with The Heart Throbs, WWE officially signed Finochio to a contract. She was then placed in WWE's developmental territory Ohio Valley Wrestling, where she made her debut on March 22, 2006, as the special guest referee in a match between Shelly Martinez and Beth Phoenix, which Phoenix won. Finochio, as Trinity, made her in-ring debut for OVW on March 29 in a match against Sosay that ended in a no-contest after she was attacked by Phoenix. In response to the attack, Trinity wrestled against Phoenix on April 5, but was defeated.

On the June 13 episode of ECW on Sci Fi, Trinity made her WWE debut as the manager for The Full Blooded Italians (Little Guido, Tony Mamaluke and Big Guido). On June 24 at an ECW house show, Finochio injured her knee after executing a moonsault from the top rope to the outside of the ring during a catfight with Kelly Kelly and Francine that stemmed from Francine winning a bikini contest earlier in the night. She underwent surgery a few days later, and was given a recovery time of six to eight weeks.

Finochio made her return on October 7, where she lost to Jazz in a singles match at a house show. She lost to Jazz in a rematch the next night. On the October 31 episode of ECW on Sci Fi, Trinity won the first ever "ECW Diva Halloween Costume Contest" after being voted over Kelly Kelly and Ariel. On January 13, 2007, Trinity teamed with fellow ECW Diva Kelly Kelly in a losing effort to Michelle McCool and Jillian Hall at a house show. The following day, Trinity wrestled her final match in WWE as she and Kelly lost to McCool and Hall in a rematch.

Finochio was later released from her WWE contract on June 22, 2007.

=== Retirement (2007–present) ===
After being released from WWE, Finochio retired from professional wrestling in order to concentrate on her stunt work. On September 20, 2008, Finochio made a one-night return to wrestling under her old Stephanie Starr ring name, where she lost a three-way match to Peggy Lee Leather, that also involved Fantasy. On April 19, 2012, Finochio began competing in roller derby as a member of the Strong Island Derby Revolution. On March 17, 2013, Trinity made her return to TNA at one of their One Night Only shows, Knockouts Knockdown, which aired on September 6, 2013. At the PPV, Trinity competed but was defeated by ODB.

== Filmography ==
=== Film ===
- Homicide (1991) stunts
- Anaconda (1997) stunts
- U Turn (1997) stunts
- USMA West Point (1998) stunts
- A Murder of Crows (1998) stunt driver
- Last Request (1999) utility stunts
- The Tic Code (1999) utility stunts
- Fever (1999) stunts
- Jesus' Son (1999) stunts
- Stringer (1999) stunt double
- Keeping The Faith (2000) stunt double
- Nora (2000) stunts
- Frequency (2000) utility stunts
- Big Money Hustlas (2000) stunts
- Pollock (2000) stunts
- Prince of Central Park (2000) stunts
- Brooklyn Babylon (2001) stunt double
- Bad Company (2002) stunt double
- Stuart Little 2 (2002) stunts
- Swimfan (2002) stunts
- Solos (2003) stunts
- The Beat (2003) stunts
- Daredevil (2003) stunts
- School of Rock (2003) stunts
- Nikki and Nora (2004) stunt double
- Eternal Sunshine of the Spotless Mind (2004) stunt player
- Spider-Man 2 (2004) stunts
- Taxi (2004) stunts
- Coalition (2004) as Leah
- Before Sundown (2005) as Sheriff
- Strangers with Candy (2005) stunts
- War of the Worlds (2005) stunts
- World Trade Center (2006) stunts
- Knock, Knock (2007) as Rachel Volpe
- The Bourne Ultimatum (2007) stunts
- Awake (2007) stunts
- Indiana Jones and the Kingdom of the Crystal Skull (2008) stunts
- Burn After Reading (2008) stunts
- Duplicity (2009) stunts
- Sex and the City 2 (2010) stunts
- Jesse (2011) as Jesse
- The Night Never Sleeps (2012) stunts

=== Television ===
- Oz (2002) in the episode "Dream a Little Dream of Me" (stunts)
- Chiller Cinema (2003) in the episode "Nashville Horror Fest 03: Part One" as Trinity
- Sex and the City (2003) in the episode "The Domino Effect" as Samantha Jones (stunts)

== Personal life ==
Finochio was born and raised in Long Island, New York, where she graduated from Lindenhurst Senior High School in 1989 before later graduating from Dowling College in 1994 with a Bachelor of Business Administration in accounting and a Bachelor of Arts in psychology. She later returned to Dowling and earned a master's degree in education in 2000. Finochio has over twenty years of experience as a dancer and is a certified aerobics instructor.

== Championships and accomplishments ==
- CyberSpace Wrestling Federation
  - CSWF Women's Championship (1 time)
- NWA Total Nonstop Action
  - TNA Year End Award (1 time)
    - Babe of the Year (2003)
