= Naked Women's Wrestling League =

Erotic women's professional wrestling promotion

- Acronym: NWWL
- Founded: 2004
- Defunct: 2009
- Style: Women's professional wrestling
- Owner: Howard Mann

The Naked Women's Wrestling League, also known as NWWL, was an erotic women's professional wrestling promotion which featured naked women "battling" in the ring. Carmen Electra acted as hostess for the organization until 2007, when she sued the company for breach of contract. The NWWL broadcast shows around the world, and its wrestlers were featured in magazines such as Penthouse, Playboy, and Maxim.

== History ==
Before creating the Naked Women's Wrestling League, the creators tried other products that featured naked women, such as online gambling, before settling on nude female wrestling.

The NWWL wrestlers were trained by Ron Hutchison. The promotion made its debut in 2004 with the release of the pay-per-view show "Vegas Stripped". It returned to pay-per-view in 2006, with the "Naked Revolution" show. Carmen Electra hosted the show, while other celebrities to appear on the program included pro-wrestling manager Jimmy "Mouth of the South" Hart, as well as adult entertainment star Mary Carey. Pay-per-views feature female wrestlers wrestling both clothed and in the nude.

In November 2007, Electra announced a lawsuit against the NWWL for, among other things, breach of contract and failure to pay money that she claimed was still due to her. In response, NWWL owner Howard Mann revealed that he would seek damages for defamation, slander and malicious persecution.

In late 2007, the NWWL launched a website where their nude wrestling matches were available for download. Since the promotion debuted, the NWWL shows have been broadcast in approximately 38 countries.

== Roster ==
- Angel of Desire
- Annie Social
- April Hunter
- Becky Brady
- Carmen Electra (hostess)
- Cleopatra
- Cruella
- Dark Angel
- Demonica Disco
- Flexi Lexi (referee at matches in Milwaukee Harley 105th)
- Harriet Bush
- Josianne the Pussycat
- Kandi Smyth
- Kylie Electra
- Lady Serpentine
- Layla Hussein
- Mandy Weaver
- Megan Summers (co-host)
- Melissa Coates
- Miss Bunny
- Ninja Chops
- Princess of Pain
- Samantha Sixx
- Selena Sanchez
- Spitney Beers
- Tiny Tina
- Trish the Dish
- Twin Peaks
- Wicca St. James
- Christine Gunn
- Lynsey Young

== DVDs ==
- Carmen Electra's NWWL, Vol. 1: Bush vs Hussein
- Carmen Electra's NWWL, Vol. 2: Tag Team Dream
- Carmen Electra's NWWL, Vol. 3: Championship Match
