= Ron Hutchison =

Canadian professional wrestler (born 1964)

Personal information
- Born: February 7, 1964 (age 62) Toronto, Ontario, Canada
- Website: Sully's Gym (official website)

Professional wrestling career
- Ring name(s): Ron Hutchison; Pretty Boy Hutchison; Masked Thunderbolt
- Billed height: 5 ft 10 in (1.78 m)
- Billed weight: 235 lb (107 kg)
- Trained by: Sweet Daddy Siki; Johnny Powers
- Debut: 1983
- Retired: 1990

Ron Hutchison (born February 7, 1964) is a retired Canadian professional wrestler, trainer and promoter who competed for Canadian independent promotions such as Grand Prix Wrestling and Maple Leaf Wrestling as well as a brief stint in the World Wrestling Federation during the mid-1980s. He is also the promoter of the Toronto-based Apocalypse Wrestling Federation and the head trainer of Carmen Electra's Naked Women's Wrestling League.

He is the owner of the Ron Hutchison Wrestling Academy at Sully's Gym and co-owner of Sweet Daddy Siki and Ron Hutchison's School of Wrestling. He is also credited as one of the leading trainers of professional wrestlers in Canada whose students include Christian, Edge, Trish Stratus, Gail Kim, Beth Phoenix, Traci Brooks, Tiger Ali Singh, Johnny Swinger, Mad Dog Rex, The Club Studd Tony Mack, Kid Lightning, David Diamond, Joe E. Legend, The Original Sinn and Asylum.

== Career ==
=== Early life and career ===
Born in Toronto, Hutchison became interested in professional wrestling at a young age watching The Shiek and Dewey Robertson. In 1981, while still attending Northern Secondary high school, the 17-year-old Hutchison began training with Sweet Daddy Siki and Johnny Powers at Sully's Gym.

Training part-time for two years, he would wrestle his first professional match with Danny Little Wolf defeating Teddy Marshall and Joey War Eagle at Scarboro Arena Gardens on June 5, 1983, and began wrestling for promoter "Bearman" Dave McKigney soon after his debut.

He would also wrestle for the WWF around Southern Ontario during the mid-1980s appearing in a televised match against The Iron Sheik on the WWF's Black Saturday cards and regularly appeared on televised matches for Maple Leaf Wrestling in Brantford, Ontario. He would later face Jake "The Snake" Roberts on April 26 and Dory Funk, Jr. on May 10 while the WWF toured Ontario in 1986.

=== Grand Prix Wrestling ===
During the summer season, he also toured with Maritime-based Grand Prix Wrestling as well as National Wrestling Alliance-affiliated territories in the Montreal and southern Ontario-area with Pro Wrestling Canada. For over three years, he would face wrestlers including Masahiro Chono, Mr. Pogo, "Killer" Karl Krupp, Jos Leduc, Frenchy Martin and Leo Burke during his time in the Maritime provinces. He would also wrestle midget star Sky Low Low and "Monster Ripper" Rhonda Singh in mixed tag team matches as well.

After touring Quebec with Leo Burke's International Wrestling promotion during 1986 and 1987, he returned to Grand Prix Wrestling as the masked wrestler The Intelligent and the Sensational Masked Thunderbolt as a member of "Bulldog" Bob Brown stable Bulldog's Army feuding with Leo Burke, "Rotten" Ron Starr, The Great Malumba, Stephen Petitpas, Vinnie Valentino, Cuban Assassin, Sunny War Cloud and Buddy Lane for over two years.

=== Retirement ===
The same year he made his wrestling debut, he began attending Ryerson Polytechnical Institute studying journalism and continued wrestling part-time during the semester, and full-time during the summer. When Johnny Powers left Sully's Gym, he was offered a position as an instructor by Siki who was impressed by his knowledge of amateur wrestling. After retiring in 1990, he remained at Sully's Gym after Siki left in 1994. Later opening a wrestling school with Siki, he would train many of Canada's top independent wrestlers throughout the 1990s, many of whom would later compete in the WWF and NWA: TNA.

In September 1997, Hutchison would appear on a wrestling event promoted by Tiger Jeet Singh in Middlesex, England with over 10,000 in attendance and later aired on PPV in India. During that year, he would also appear with WWF Canada President Carl De Marco on CBC TV's teen talk show "Jonovision" as well as a second appearance in September 1998 along with two students, Tiger Ali Singh and Jason Sensation.

=== Apocalypse Wrestling Federation ===
In August 1998, in association with his wrestling school, Hutchison established the Apocalypse Wrestling Federation which began holding events in the Toronto-area with its first show on August 30, 1998. During the next year, Missy Hyatt would make her Canadian debut appearing at the supercard "A Valentine to Remember" on February 14 winning the AWF Heavyweight Championship in a mixed tag team match with Miss B. Haven against Sherri Martel and the Squeegee Kid during the event. This would be the first wrestling event in which a woman would hold a men's wrestling title.

During that same year, he would also promote Terry Funk's Canadian retirement match "One Last Dance" in which Funk would defeat Sabu on June 6, 1999. The following month, he would begin promoting the annual AWF Ironman Tournament in which over 100 matches would be booked in an 18-day period. The tournament, which would be held for the next four years, would feature matches from top Canadian independent wrestlers and, in 2002, the Canadian debuts of Jillian Hall, Beth Phoenix and Japanese female wrestler Sumie Sakai.

On Sun. May 3, 2009 Hutchison revived the Apocalypse Wrestling Federation when the AWF promoted a card called "Super Scrap" to crown a new AWF Heavyweight Champion in Whitby, Ontario, Canada. The promotion continued to run in Whitby for several years hence.

On August 11 and 12, 2012 Hutchison's Apocalypse Wrestling Federation teamed with concert promoters Live Nation to present The Heavy TO Heavyweight Series, outdoors, in Toronto's Downsview Park. A crowd well in excess of 50,000 braved the weekend rainfall to see the AWF wrestling and Heavy Metal acts featuring wrestlers like Tommy Dreamer, Raven, Rhino, Johnny Swinger, Joe E. Legend and the Apocalypse Wrestling Federation regulars. Heavy metal superstars such as Marilyn Manson, Five Finger Death Punch, System of a Down and Slipknot also performed at the outdoor heavy metal music festival.

=== Recent years ===
In early 2003, he and AWF Promotions President Rod Boudreau issued a public statement announcing the purchase of the historical Newsboys boxing gym in Toronto's east end and reopening the training center as the Pro Wrestling Training Gym. In April of that year, he traveled to Tokyo, Japan to organize GAEA Japan's 8th Anniversary show at the Yokohama Bunka Gym with promoter Chigusa Nagayo.

He would later co-promote Carmen Electra's female wrestling promotion, the Naked Women's Wrestling League, serving as the promotion's head trainer and consultant in October 2003. As recently as 2005, he began training former reality TV star Mandy Weaver for a career in the promotion.

In October 2007, Hutchison took part in a three-city tour of India with Tiger Jeet Singh's Universal Wrestling Stars, Incorporated and included American independent wrestlers Sonjay Dutt, Steve Corino, Jerry Lynn, Don Paysan as well as Canadian female wrestlers Kacey Diamond, Josianne the Pussycat and Portia Perez.

While in Ludhiana, Punjab, Hutchison was involved in an incident in which Russian wrestler Jason the Legend of Pro Wrestling ZERO-ONE attempted to assault several Indian reporters during a press conference when the wrestlers were apparently told their tour was to be postponed. Throwing a table across the room, Jason had attempted to assault the reporters before being restrained by several wrestlers present. Although there were no reports of anyone injured, the Senior Superintendent of Police had reported that the wrestler's passports had been seized pending a police investigation. The incident would also be shown on Indian television such as Day Break as well as being covered by the Daily India and The Times of India.

In the spring of 2013 Hutchison presented a wrestling training seminar at the Cauliflower Alley Club's annual convention at the Gold Coast Hotel and Casino in Las Vegas, NV. The seminar attracted wrestling notables such as Nigel McGuiness, Les Thatcher, Ross Hart and World Wrestling Entertainment personnel, such as Edge and Beth Phoenix.

In late May and June 2013, Hutchison came out of a 23-year retirement from the wrestling ring and returned to Emile Dupree's Atlantic Grand Prix Wrestling as The Masked Thunderbolt. The tour began in Borden-Carleton, Prince Edward Island where Hutchison pinned Jeremy Prophet and continued on throughout Atlantic Canada 7 nights a week for 5 weeks.

On April 29, 2019, Hutchison published his first book; Pain Torture Agony. The book, edited by Scott Teal, is a compelling, inside-look at the tough world of pro-wrestling, as told in an informative and often humorous manner.

== Championships and accomplishments ==
- Big Time Wrestling
  - Canadian Heavyweight Championship (1 time)
- Canadian Pro-Wrestling Hall of Fame
  - Class of 2022
- Cauliflower Alley Club
  - Trainers Award (2014)
- George Tragos/Lou Thesz Professional Wrestling Hall of Fame
  - Verne Gagne Trainer Award (2025)
- Wrestling Superstars
  - Canadian Junior Heavyweight Championship (1 time)
