= NWA Shockwave Women's Championship =

Professional wrestling women's championship

Details
- Promotion: NWA Shockwave
- Date established: October 29, 2002
- Date retired: December 1, 2006

Other names
- CSWF Women's Championship; NWA: Cyberspace Women's Championship
Statistics
- First champion: Alexis Laree
- Final champions: Jazz (won April 30, 2005)
- Most reigns: All reigns 1
- Longest reign: Jazz (580 days)
- Shortest reign: Alexis Laree (168 days)

The NWA Shockwave Women's Championship was a women's professional wrestling championship in NWA Shockwave (NWA-SW) and the National Wrestling Alliance (NWA). It was the original title of the CyberSpace Wrestling Federation promotion and was later recognized by the NWA as a regional title. It was introduced as the CSWF Women's Championship on January 25, 2003. It was established as an NWA women's championship in 2005 following the promotion's admission into the NWA. The promotion became NWA: Cyberspace, and later NWA Shockwave, with the title remaining active until its retirement in 2006.

The inaugural champion was Alexis Laree, who defeated Serena and April Hunter in a three way match on January 25, 2003 to become the first CSWF Women's Champion. There were four officially recognized champions, though none held the belt more than once. At 494 days, Jazz was the longest reigning champion in the title's history. This record is the highest of any other title in the promotion.

== Title history ==
=== Names ===
Name	Years
CSWF Women's Championship	2002 — 2005
NWA: Cyberspace Women's Championship	2005 — 2006

=== Reigns ===
Key
No.	Overall reign number
Reign	Reign number for the specific champion
Days	Number of days held

No.	Champion	Championship change			Reign statistics		Notes	Ref.
No.	Champion	Date	Event	Location	Reign	Days	Notes	Ref.
1	Alexis Laree	January 25, 2003	Halloween Horror	Flemington, NJ	1	168	Laree defeated April Hunter and Serena in a three-way match to become the inaugural champion.	
—	Vacated	July 12, 2003	—	—	—	—	The championship was vacated when Alexis Laree left the promotion due to a contract dispute.	
2	Trinity	September 13, 2003	T-NvAsion	Rahway, NJ	1	350	Trinity defeated April Hunter to win the vacated championship.	
3	April Hunter	August 28, 2004	CyberCade	Wayne, NJ	1	245	This was a four-way match, also involving Ariel and Tracy Brooks. On January 8, 2005, the title was renamed the NWA: Cyberspace Women's Championship when the promotion joins the National Wrestling Alliance.	
4	Jazz	April 30, 2005	CyberSpace Retribution	Wayne, NJ	1	580		
—	Deactivated	December 1, 2006	—	—	—	—	The championship was discontinued when NWA Shockwave returned after a six-month hiatus following the death of founder Billy Firehawk.	

== See also ==
- List of National Wrestling Alliance championships
