= Baby Doll (wrestler) =

American professional wrestler and valet

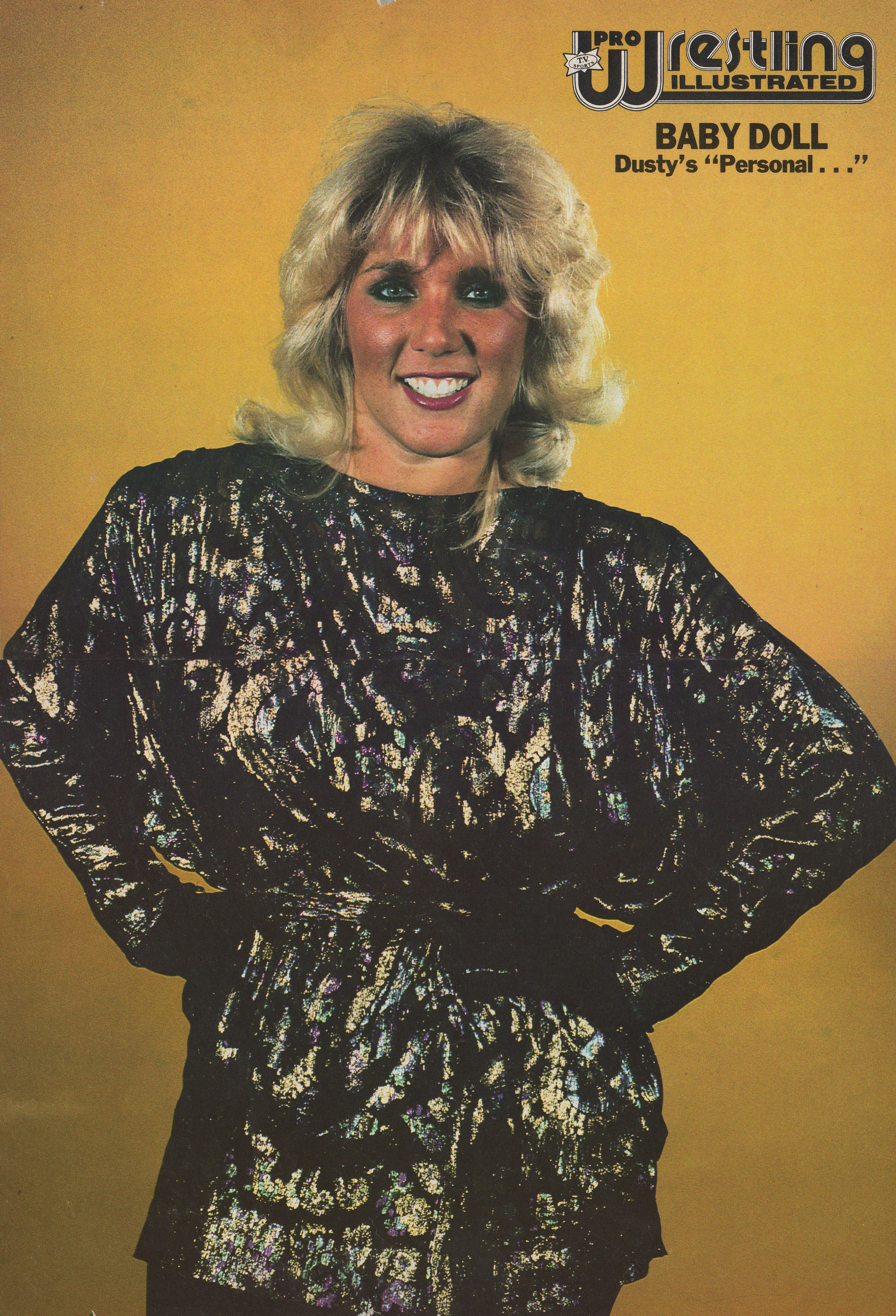
- Baby Doll in 1986

Personal information
- Born: Nickla Ann Roberts; February 13, 1962 (age 64) Lubbock, Texas, U.S.
- Spouses: Sam Houston (m. 1986; div. 1994) Chad Byrd (m. 2017)
- Children: 2

Professional wrestling career
- Ring name(s): Andrea, the Lady Giant; Baby Doll
- Billed height: 5 ft 10 in (1.78 m)
- Billed weight: 190 lb (86 kg)
- Trained by: Lorraine Johnson; Jake Roberts; Nick Roberts; Nelson Royal
- Debut: 1984
- Retired: 1992

Nickla Ann Roberts-Byrd (born February 13, 1962) is an American semi-retired professional wrestler and valet, better known by her ring name, "The Perfect 10" Baby Doll. She is best known for her appearances with World Class Championship Wrestling and Jim Crockett Promotions in the 1980s.

== Professional wrestling career ==
Roberts was born in Lubbock, Texas to Nick Roberts and Lorraine Johnson. Both Nick Roberts and Johnson were professional wrestlers and promoted weekly events at the Fair Park Coliseum. During her childhood, Roberts sold programs at her father's events, in the process befriending future wrestlers Bruce and Keith Hart and Kerry and Kevin Von Erich. From an early age, Roberts aimed to become a professional wrestler.

=== World Class Championship Wrestling (1984) ===
In the summer of 1984, while training to become an emergency medical technician (EMT), Roberts overheard her parents say that her childhood crush, World Class Championship Wrestling (WCCW) wrestler Gino Hernandez, was in need of a valet. Unbeknownst to her parents, Roberts contacted David Manning, the WCCW booker, and proposed that she could manage Hernandez. After Manning agreed, Roberts left college and traveled to San Antonio, Texas, making her debut alongside Hernandez in the sold-out Freeman Coliseum. She went on to train under Nelson Royal for the remainder of the summer.

Performing under the ring name Andrea, the Lady Giant (a reference to André the Giant), Roberts was booked to dominate both male and female wrestlers in the ring. Her character had a punk haircut and typically wore leather pants, a leather jacket, metal studded belts, spiked dog collars and wristbands and scarves and T-shirts relating to rock bands such as Aerosmith and Mötley Crüe. Hernandez and Roberts feuded with Mike Von Erich and his manager, Sunshine.

=== Jim Crockett Promotions (1985-1987) ===
Roberts left WCCW in December 1984. In February 1985, she joined the National Wrestling Alliance member Jim Crockett Promotions (JCP). She was introduced by Tully Blanchard as his new manager, "The Perfect 10" Baby Doll. She assisted Blanchard during his feuds with Dusty Rhodes and Magnum T. A. After Rhodes defeated Blanchard for the NWA World Television Championship at The Great American Bash on July 6, 1985, Roberts was forced to be Rhodes' valet for 30 days. During this time, vignettes aired in which Rhodes tried to turn her into a "real lady."

In December 1985, JCP ran an angle to get J.J. Dillon in as Blanchard's manager. Baby Doll was missing from Blanchard's side for some time and then returned on December 28 at a house show. Tully confronted her in an interview and demanded to know where she had been. The angle played out that J.J. had given her a ticket to Mexico and said it was from Tully for her Christmas present. Dillon denied it and Tully hit Baby Doll who was then "saved" by Dusty Rhodes.

During a weekly Monday night television taping in Greenville, South Carolina in 1986, Jim Cornette and Beautiful Bobby Eaton attacked Roberts with a tennis racquet. She responded by introducing The Warlord as her newest client. The Warlord briefly feuded with Big Bubba Rogers before leaving JCP to further his training. At the 1986 Great American Bash on July 5, 1986, Roberts, Rhodes and Magnum T. A. defeated Cornette and The Midnight Express in a steel cage match. In addition to Rhodes and Magnum T. A., She also teamed with the Rock 'n' Roll Express and the Road Warriors against Cornette and the Midnight Express throughout the 1986 Great American Bash Tour.

On August 23, 1986, Roberts turned on Rhodes, helping Ric Flair to keep the NWA World Heavyweight Championship during a title bout with Rhodes in St. Louis, Missouri. Roberts briefly managed Flair before the JCP booking office sent her to the NWA Central States territory due to their disapproval of her marriage to fellow wrestler Michael "Sam Houston" Smith.

=== Universal Wrestling Federation (1987) ===
In 1987, Roberts left JCP and joined the Oklahoma City, Oklahoma-based Universal Wrestling Federation (UWF) alongside her husband. Upon leaving the UWF, she began appearing on the independent circuit with Houston.

=== Return to JCP (1988) ===
In 1988, Roberts returned to Jim Crockett Promotions, managing Larry Zbyszko during his feud with Barry Windham over the NWA Western States Heritage Championship. Her tenure was short lived as her husband was then working for the rival World Wrestling Federation (WWF) in what was regarded as a conflict of interest.

=== World Wrestling Federation (1988) ===
Roberts heard about the WWF restarting their women's division and trained with Nelson Royal to improve her ring-skills alongside her sister-in-law Robin Smith. Both tried out with the WWF, but Smith was chosen over Roberts.

=== Independent circuit (2005, 2007-present) ===
At the inaugural WrestleReunion event on January 29, 2005 in Tampa, Florida, Roberts accompanied Jeff Jarrett to ringside for his successful defense of the NWA World Heavyweight Championship in a bout with Tully Blanchard. She went on to manage a number of wrestlers on the independent circuit throughout the late 2000s (decade). In 2016, Baby Doll appeared for Big Time Wrestling in Spartanburg, South Carolina, and Morganton, North Carolina, in "Battle of the Sexes" matches vs. Jim Cornette.

== Personal life ==
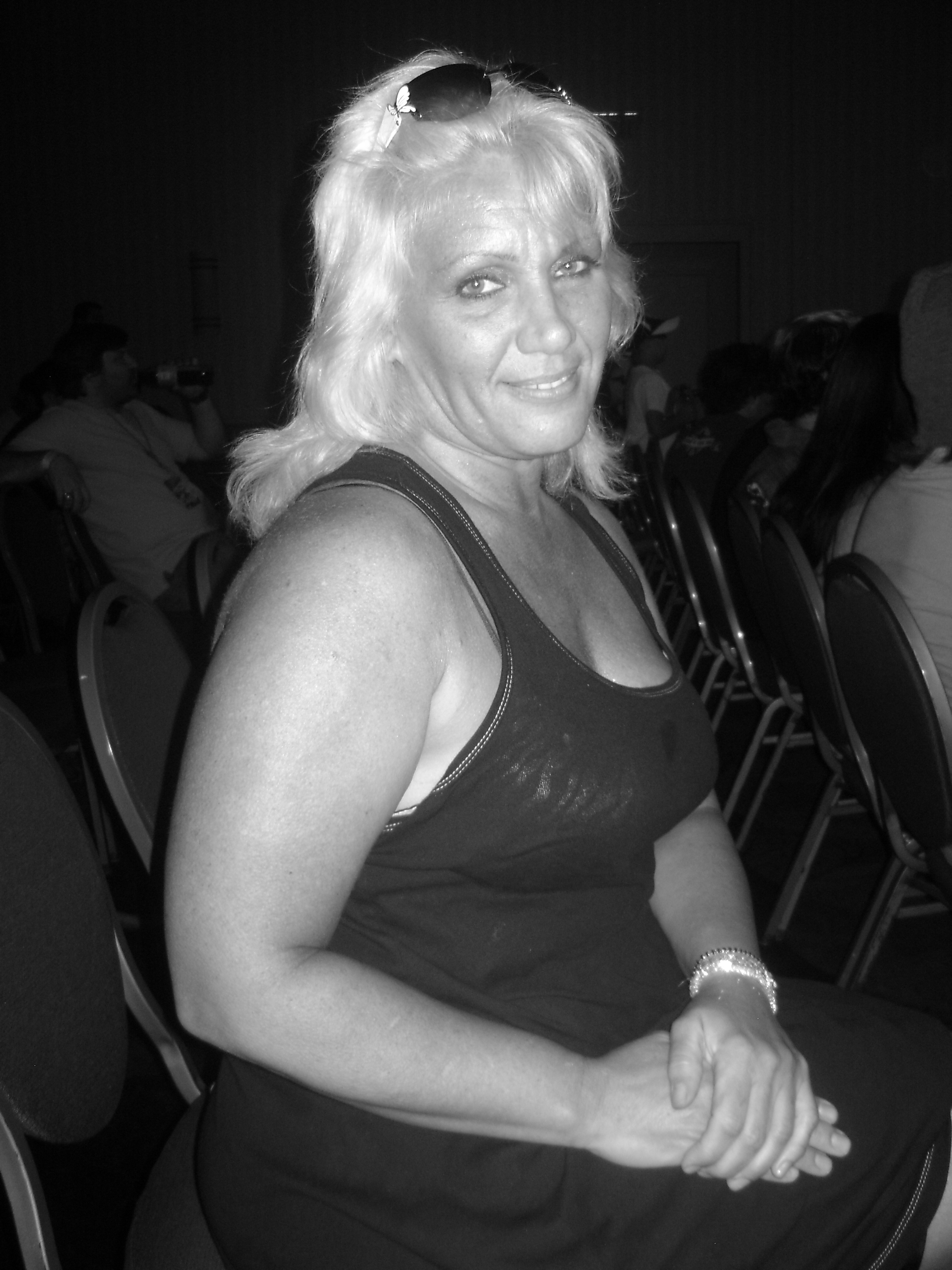
Roberts in 2010

While at high school, Roberts set several records for the shot put.

Roberts married fellow wrestler Michael "Sam Houston" Smith on July 30, 1986 in Lubbock, Texas. She gave birth to two daughters; Mikka Tyler Smith, in 1991, and Mikala Joy Smith, in 1992. Roberts retired from professional wrestling upon the birth of her second daughter, opting to devote her time to her children. She and Smith separated in 1991, briefly reconciled in 1992 and ultimately were divorced on February 17, 1995.

After retiring from professional wrestling, Roberts worked in a number of fields, including baggage handling, cable installation, the manufacture of apparel for wrestlers and 13 years at Wal-Mart.

Roberts married Chad Byrd on July 4, 2017; they reside in Caldwell County, North Carolina.

== Championships and accomplishments ==
- National Wrestling Alliance
  - NWA Legends Hall of Heroes (2016)
- Windy City Pro Wrestling
  - WCPW Ladies Championship (1 time)
