= WCPW Ladies Championship =

Professional wrestling women's championship

Details
- Promotion: Windy City Pro Wrestling
- Date established: April 19, 1988
- Date retired: December 16, 2010
Statistics
- First champion: Candi Devine
- Final champions: Faith (won September 26, 2009)
- Most reigns: Lips Manson (3)
- Longest reign: Cheeks Manson (980 days)
- Shortest reign: Maria Maceli (29 days)

The WCPW Ladies Championship (also called the WCPW Women's Championship) was a women's professional wrestling championship in Windy City Pro Wrestling (WCPW). Originally, WCPW was known as Windy City Wrestling (WCW), however, a lawsuit brought by World Championship Wrestling forced the smaller promotion to change its name to "Windy City Pro Wrestling" in 1997. The championship remained active until December 2010, when WCPW merged with the Chicago Pro Wrestling Academy to form Dynasty Sports Entertainment.

The inaugural champion was Candi Devine, who won the title at a live event in Chicago, Illinois on April 19, 1988 to become the first WCW Women's Champion. Lips Manson holds the record for most reigns, with three. "Awesome" Ondi Austin held the title four times, however, the promotion only officially recognizes two of her reigns. At 980 days, Cheeks Manson was the longest reigning champion in the title's history. Maria Maceli's second reign was the shortest in the history of the title lasting only 29 days. Overall, there have been 21 reigns shared between 32 wrestlers, with nine vacancies, and 1 deactivation.

== Title history ==
=== Names ===
Name	Years
WCW Women's Championship	1988 — 1996
WCPW Women's Championship	1997 — 2010

=== Reigns ===
Key
No.	Overall reign number
Reign	Reign number for the specific champion
Days	Number of days held
†	Championship change is unrecognized by the promotion

No.	Champion	Championship change			Reign statistics		Notes	Ref.
No.	Champion	Date	Event	Location	Reign	Days	Notes	Ref.
1	Candi Devine	April 19, 1988	Live event	Chicago, IL	1	32		
†	Ondi Austin	May 21, 1988	Live event	Chicago, IL	1	1		
†	Candi Devine	May 22, 1988	Live event	Dixon, IL	2	131		
2	Ondi Austin	September 30, 1988	Live event	Chicago, IL	1^{(2)}	134		
3	Dazzler	February 11, 1989	WCW TV Tapings	Cicero, IL	1	49		
4	Ondi Austin	April 1, 1989	Live event	Malta, IL	2^{(3)}	373		
5	Lisa Starr	April 9, 1990	Live event	Nashville, TN	1	404		
6	Ondi Austin	May 18, 1991	Live event	Chicago, IL	3^{(4)}	106		
7	Lisa Starr	September 1, 1991	Live event	Chicago, IL	2	(Note: The exact date the championship was vacated is unknown, which means the title reign lasted between 608 and 638 days.)		
—	Vacated	May 1993	—	—	—	—	The championship becomes vacant after Lisa Starr was stripped of the title.	
8	Toni Alexis	May 22, 1993	Live event	Chicago, IL	1	360	Alexis defeated Vandela to win the vacant championship.	
9	Susan Green	May 17, 1994	Live event	Hammond, IN	1	(Note: The exact date the championship was vacated is unknown, which means the title reign lasted between 168 and 197 days.)		
—	Vacated	November 1994	—	—	—	—	The championship becomes vacant when Susan Green retired.	
10	Toni Alexis	November 5, 1994	Live event	Chicago, IL	2	196	Alexis was awarded the vacant championship.	
11	Candi Devine	May 20, 1995	Live event	Hammond, IN	2^{(3)}	364	Alexis was awarded the vacant championship.	
12	Cybill	May 18, 1996	Battle of the Belts VIII	Hammond, IN	1	(Note: The exact date the championship was vacated is unknown, which means the title reign lasted between 348 and 378 days.)		
—	Vacated	May 1997	—	—	—	—	The championship was vacated when Cybil was suspended and subsequently stripped as champion.	
13	Baby Doll	May 17, 1997	Live event	Cicero, IL	1	366	Doll won a tournament final to win the vacant championship.	
14	Lips Manson	May 18, 1998	Battle of the Belts X	Cicero, IL	1	243		
—	Vacated	January 16, 1999	—	—	—	—	The championship becomes vacant when Lips Manson was stripped as champion for failing to defend the title within a six-month period.	
15	Maria Maceli	January 16, 1999	—	—	1	126	Maceli was awarded the vacant championship.	
16	Cinnamon	May 22, 1999	Live event	Chicago, IL	1	49		
17	Maria Maceli	July 10, 1999	Live event	Chicago, IL	2	29		
18	Kat	August 8, 1999	Live event	Chicago, IL	1	63		
19	Crystal	October 10, 1999	War at the World: Day 2	Tinley Park, IL	1	188		
20	Drusala	April 15, 2000	Live event	Chicago, IL	1	378		
—	Vacated	April 28, 2001	Live event	Chicago, IL	—	—	The championship becomes vacant when Drusala was unable to compete due to injury.	
21	Angel	April 28, 2001	Live event	Cicero, IL	1	140	Angel defeated Krystal to win the vacant championship.	
22	Phoenix	September 15, 2001	Live event	Chicago, IL	1	42		
23	Angel	October 27, 2001	Live event	Chicago, IL	2	(Note: The exact date the championship was vacated is unknown.)		
—	Vacated	2002	—	—	—	—	The championship was vacated due to undocumented reasons.	
24	SoSay	May 17, 2003	Live event	Cicero, IL	1		SoSay defeated Sandra D to win the vacant championship.	
—	Vacated	2003	—	—	—	—	The championship becomes vacant when SoSay was unable to compete due to injury.	
25	Cheeks Manson	September 13, 2003	A Midsummer Night's Classic	Chicago, IL	1	980	Manson won a tournament final to win the vacant championship.	
26	Dymond	May 20, 2006	Battle of the Belts 18	Chicago, IL	1	(Note: The exact date the championship was vacated is unknown, which means the title reign lasted between 469 and 498 days.)		
—	Vacated	September 2007	—	—	—	—	The championship becomes vacant when Dymond left the promotion to join the Vanguard Wrestling All-Star Alliance.	
27	Faith	2007	—	—	1			
28	Mia Martinez	December 13, 2008	Live event	Calumet City, IL	1	209		
29	Lacey Von Erich	July 10, 2009	Legends under the Stars	Villa Park, IL	1	78	This was a five-way match, which also involved Faith, Juliet the Huntress, Kimberly Kash and Mia Martinez.	
—	Vacated	September 26, 2009	Star Spangled Banner	Chicago, IL	—	—	The championship is vacated when Lacey Von Erich surrenders the title when she signs a contract with Total Nonstop Action Wrestling (TNA)	
30	Faith	September 26, 2009	Live event	Chicago, IL	1	446	Faith defeated Mia Martinez to win the vacant championship.	
—	Deactivated	December 16, 2010	—	—	—	—	WCPW merged with Chicago Pro Wrestling Academy on December 16, 2010, to form Dynasty Sports Entertainment and Faith was the final champion in WCPW as a company.	

== Combined reigns ==
Rank	Wrestler	No. of reigns	Combined days
1	Cheeks Manson	1	980
2	Lisa "L.A." Starr	2	804
3	Lips Manson	3	799
4	Candi Devine	3	661
5	Ondi Austin	4	614
6	Baby Doll	1	366
7	Drusala	1	358
8	Mia Martinez	1	209
9	Crystal	1	189
10	Maria Maceli	2	155
11	Angel	1	140
12	Lacey Von Erich	1	78
13	Kat	1	63
14	lCinnamon	1	49
15	Dazzler	1	49
16	Phoenix	1	42
