= Sosay =

American actor, model and artist (born 1980)

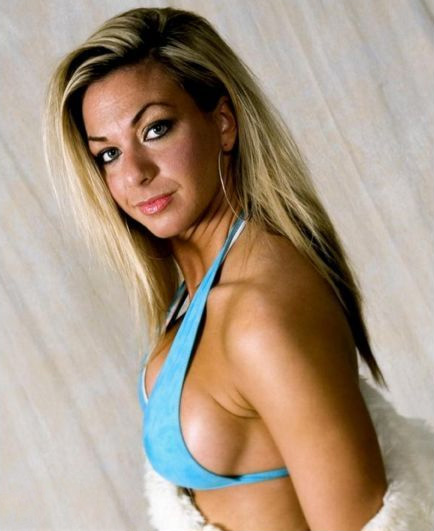

Personal information
- Born: Jennifer Elaine Kaiser; January 6, 1981 (age 45) Michigan

Professional wrestling career
- Ring name(s): Desiree; Sosay
- Billed height: 5 ft 6 in (1.68 m)
- Billed weight: 128 lb (58 kg)
- Billed from: Sin City
- Trained by: Al Snow; Lance Storm; Nick Dinsmore; Rip Rogers; Sam DeCero; Windy City Pro Wrestling; Ohio Valley Wrestling
- Debut: April 2003
- Retired: 2013

Jennifer Elaine Kaiser (born January 6, 1980) is an American artist, model, trainer, and retired professional wrestler. She is best known for her time with Ohio Valley Wrestling under the ring name Sosay (pronounced So-Say).

== Early life ==
Growing up in Southwest Michigan, Kaiser lived with her parents and four brothers on an old working farm along with multiple cats, dogs and horses. After graduating from high school, Kaiser began studying at both Michigan State University and Loyola University of Chicago before graduating with degrees in pre-law and studio art. While studying at Loyola, Kaiser began training to become a professional wrestler.

== Professional wrestling career ==
=== Debut ===
Kaiser made her professional wrestling debut in April 2003 and began competing for Windy City Pro Wrestling. While in WCPW, she would defeat Sandra D to win the Ladies Championship before later vacating the title to further her art and personal training careers.

=== Ohio Valley Wrestling (2003–2007, 2013) ===
Following her stint in Windy City Pro Wrestling, Kaiser moved to Louisville, Kentucky, before the end of 2003 and joined Ohio Valley Wrestling. She debuted for the promotion under the name ring name Sosay, where she became a member of Kenny Bolin's stable Bolin Services and became the "personal secretary" and later the storyline girlfriend of Ken Doane. Soon after debuting, Sosay began feuding with Maria, which culminated in a match on October 29 that ended in a no contest. Following this, Sosay would later have brief feuds with Trinity and Shelly Martinez.

When Doane debuted on World Wrestling Entertainment's main roster, Sosay soon became the "publicist" for Jack Bull, who began using a stuntman gimmick. The two later engaged in a feud with Joey Mercury, which saw Bull losing to Mercury on November 5. Bull then challenged Mercury to a drinking contest, which Bull won. On November 29, Bull attempted an escape stunt involving chains, but was soon struck with a chair by Mercury before he performed a double underhook DDT on Sosay, injuring her in storyline. On December 20, Bull, without Sosay, defeated Mercury in a grudge match. Sosay later returned to OVW on January 13, 2007, and resumed her role as Bull's publicist as he took part in a "test of strength" against Charles Evans and Justin LaRouche. However, both Evans and LaRouche attacked Bull and then attempted to attack Sosay until Idol Stevens saved her. On January 17, Evans and LaRouche defeated Bull and Atlas DaBone in a tag team match with Sosay at ringside. However, Sosay's association with Bull was ended only two days later when he was released from his developmental contract. After competing in a few Miss OVW contests, Sosay wrestled what would be the final match in her full-time active wrestling career, as she teamed with Beth Phoenix and Katie Lea in a winning effort to Serena, Victoria Crawford and Maryse in a six-woman tag team dark match on April 25, 2007.

After a six-year hiatus from professional wrestling, Sosay made a one-time return to OVW on April 13, 2013, where she was defeated by Jessie Belle in a dark match.

=== Retirement (2013) ===
Soon after her one-time return to OVW, Sosay wrestled at 6 Corners BBQ Fest in Chicago for Pro Wrestling Experience on June 15, 2013, where she teamed with Tony Atlas to defeat Melanie Cruise and Robo De Luna in a mixed tag team match. Following this, Kaiser retired from professional wrestling to focus on her art and personal training careers.

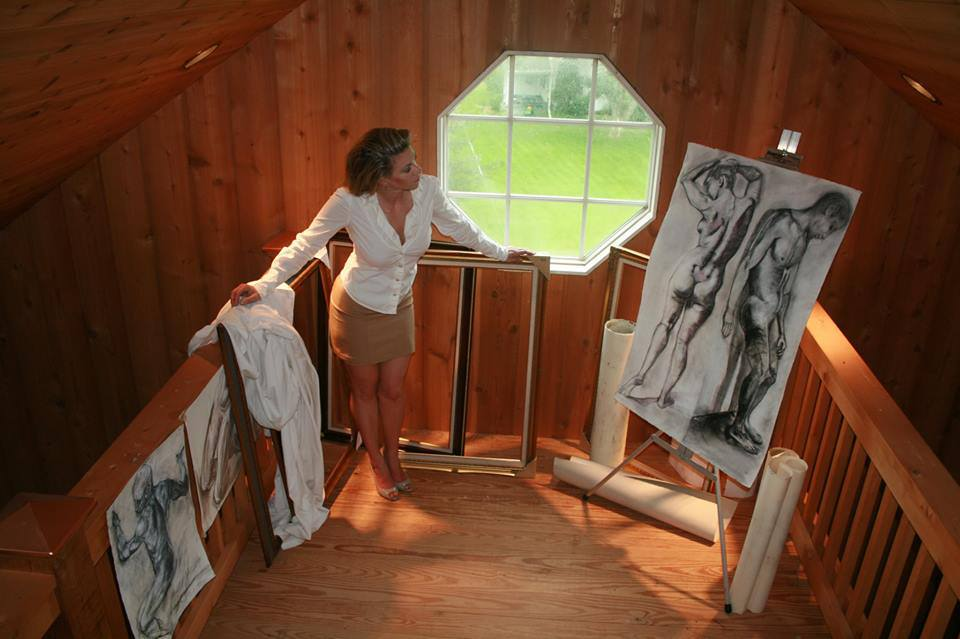
Kaiser displaying her original art in her Michigan home studio in June 2013.

== Championships and accomplishments ==
- Windy City Pro Wrestling

- WCPW Ladies Championship (1 time)
