= Lacey Von Erich =

American retired professional wrestler

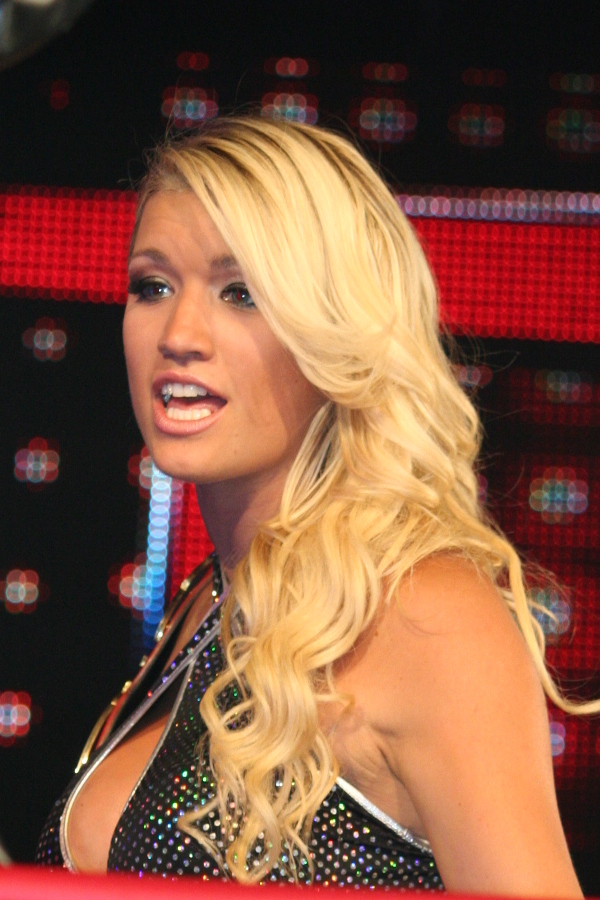
- Von Erich in 2010

Personal information
- Born: Lacey Dawn Adkisson; July 17, 1986 (age 40) Dallas, Texas, U.S.
- Spouse: Grant Blindbury (m. 2011)
- Children: 3
- Family: Von Erich

Professional wrestling career
- Ring name: Lacey Von Erich
- Billed height: 5 ft 10 in (1.78 m)
- Billed weight: 155 lb (70 kg)
- Billed from: Denton, Texas
- Trained by: Steve Keirn; Tom Prichard
- Debut: September 15, 2007
- Retired: 2010

Lacey Dawn Adkisson (born July 17, 1986) is an American retired professional wrestler best known by her ring name Lacey Von Erich. She is the daughter of Kerry Von Erich and the granddaughter of Fritz Von Erich. She is best known for her time in Total Nonstop Action Wrestling (TNA), where she is a one-time TNA Knockouts Tag Team Champion.

== Professional wrestling career ==
=== World Wrestling Entertainment (2007) ===
Adkisson signed a developmental contract with World Wrestling Entertainment (WWE) in August 2007. She was assigned to their then-developmental territory, Florida Championship Wrestling (FCW) in Tampa, Florida, and became the first third generation wrestler from the Von Erich family. She made her debut for FCW on September 15, managing Billy Kidman under the ring name "Lacey Von Erich". On September 25, Von Erich then appeared as the valet for Ryan O' Reilly along with Maryse Ouellet. On October 9, Von Erich made her in-ring debut in a loss against Nattie Neidhart. On October 23, Von Erich managed Victoria Crawford in her match against Nicole Bella, and the following month at the November 13 television tapings, Von Erich teamed with Neidhart and Maryse Ouellet in a loss to Crawford and The Bella Twins. Later that month, Von Erich was released from her developmental contract after she requested to transfer to Ohio Valley Wrestling, another WWE developmental territory, in order to relocate from Tampa, but the company declined.

Von Erich made an appearance at WrestleMania XXV on April 5, 2009, where the Von Erich family was inducted into the WWE Hall of Fame. She was seen in the audience while her uncle, Kevin Von Erich, accepted the induction.

=== Independent circuit (2008–2009) ===
Von Erich made her debut for Women Superstars Uncensored (WSU) on the March 7, 2008, at the WSU Dawn of the Day event, where she defeated Angel Orsini in a singles match. On March 8, 2008, at the ECPW Arena in Lake Hiawatha, New Jersey, Lacey made her return to wrestling (accompanied by Missy Hyatt) where she defeated Angel Orsini. On March 22, Von Erich made her debut in Professional Championship Wrestling (PCW) in Arlington, Texas. She teamed up with Action Jackson to defeat Mike Foxx and Claudia in a mixed tag team match. Before her debut in PCW, she wrestled in a mixed tag team match against JT Lamotta and Miss Diss Lexia at South West Wrestling Alliance (SWWA) in Granbury, Texas. Von Erich made her debut for Pro Wrestling Revolution (PWR) on July 7 at a PWR event, where she defeated Cheerleader Melissa. In December 2008, she defeated Melissa at a PWR event in San Francisco, California.

On July 10, 2009, Von Erich made her debut for Windy City Pro Wrestling (WCPW), winning the WCPW Ladies Championship in a four-way match against Faith, Huntress, and Kimberly Kash. On September 26, Von Erich vacated the WCPW Ladies Championship after she signed a contract with Total Nonstop Action Wrestling (TNA). Von Erich made her debut for CWF Wrestling, on the July 25, 2009, episode of CWF Wrestling, where she defeated Simply Luscious. In November 2009, Von Erich took part in the Australian tour "Hulkamania: Let the Battle Begin" created by Hulk Hogan. On November 21, she won a bikini contest, which also included Koa Marie Turner, Stephanie Pietz and Kiara Dillon. She also interfered in the main event between Hogan and Ric Flair, on Flair's behalf. In other matches on the tour, she was used as Flair's manager.

=== Wrestlicious (2009–2010) ===
In 2009, Von Erich began working for the all-female wrestling promotion Wrestlicious, which was created by Jimmy Hart and started airing in March 2010. She, however, had to be released by the company after the tapings of the first season of episodes, after signing with Total Nonstop Action Wrestling (TNA). She debuted on March 17 episode of Takedown in a tag team main event, where she and Amber Lively defeated Draculetta and White Magic by disqualification. On the April 7 episode of Takedown, Von Erich participated in a battle royal to determine the top two contenders for the Wrestlicious Crown, but was eliminated by Kickstart Katie. On the May 19 episode of Takedown, Von Erich helped Alexandra the Great in her submission match against Kickstart Katie. She ended up putting Brooke Lynne in the Von Erich Claw to make her drop her towel and give Alexandra the victory over Katie.

=== Total Nonstop Action Wrestling (2009–2010) ===
On the October 1, 2009, episode of Total Nonstop Action Wrestling (TNA)'s Impact!, Von Erich debuted as a villainous character by aligning herself with The Beautiful People (Velvet Sky and Madison Rayne) and attacking the TNA Knockouts Tag Team Champions, Taylor Wilde, and Sarita. On the October 15 episode of Impact!, she made her in-ring debut teaming with Sky and Rayne in a six-Knockout tag team match, where they defeated the team of Awesome Kong, ODB, and Tara. Two weeks later on Impact!, she once again teamed with Sky and Rayne in a six-Knockouts tag team match, where they defeated ODB, Christy Hemme, and Hamada, when Von Erich pinned Hemme, scoring her first victory in TNA. On November 5, Von Erich began carrying a pink nightstick with her to the ring, which was dubbed "Lacey's Ugly Stick". At Turning Point, the Beautiful People were unsuccessful in gaining both the TNA Knockouts Tag Team Championship and the TNA Knockouts Championship, as ODB pinned Rayne in a six-way tag team match with all the titles on the line to win the match for the reigning champions. The Beautiful People began appearing in backstage segments they dubbed as their reality show "The Meanest Girls", an allusion to the 2004 teen comedy Mean Girls. On the December 10 episode of Impact!, Von Erich was defeated by Velvet Sky in a mud wrestling match refereed by Madison Rayne. The match was booked by Kevin Nash, who was in charge for the evening, in an attempt to garner ratings. On December 17 episode of Impact!, Von Erich had a backstage confrontation with interviewer Lauren Brooke, which ended with Brooke slapping Von Erich. The following week, Von Erich claimed that she had gotten Brooke fired from TNA.

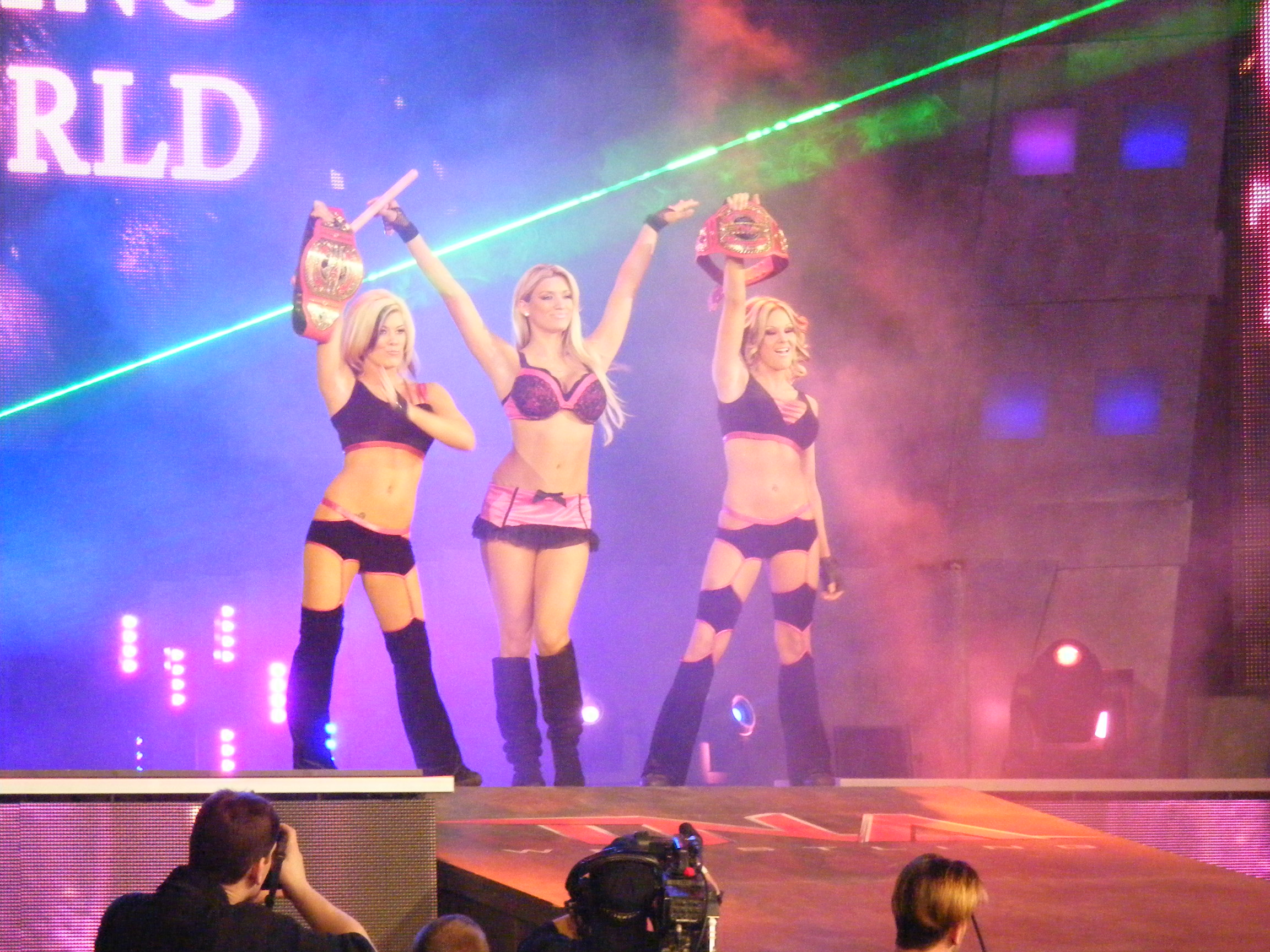
Von Erich (center) as part of The Beautiful People, along with Madison Rayne (left) and Velvet Sky (right) as the TNA Knockouts Tag Team Champions

On the January 14, 2010, episode of Impact!, Sky, Rayne, and Von Erich were attacked by the returning Angelina Love, whom Von Erich had replaced in the Beautiful People. On the March 8 episode of Impact!, Rayne and Sky defeated the teams of Love and Tara and Sarita and Taylor Wilde in a three-way match to win the vacant TNA Knockouts Tag Team Championship, which they defended with Von Erich under the Freebird rule. Von Erich's first title defense was on the April 19 episode of Impact!, where she teamed with Velvet Sky to defeat the team of Daffney and ODB. On the May 8 episode of Impact!, Von Erich, Sky, and Rayne successfully defended their titles against Sarita, Taylor Wilde, and Tara. On the May 17 episode of Impact!, Von Erich and Sky successfully defended their titles against Sarita and Taylor Wilde. On the June 17 episode of Impact!, Von Erich competed in her second singles match in TNA against Angelina Love, who was making a return from an injury, and won by disqualification after she was dropped on a steel chair with a DDT.

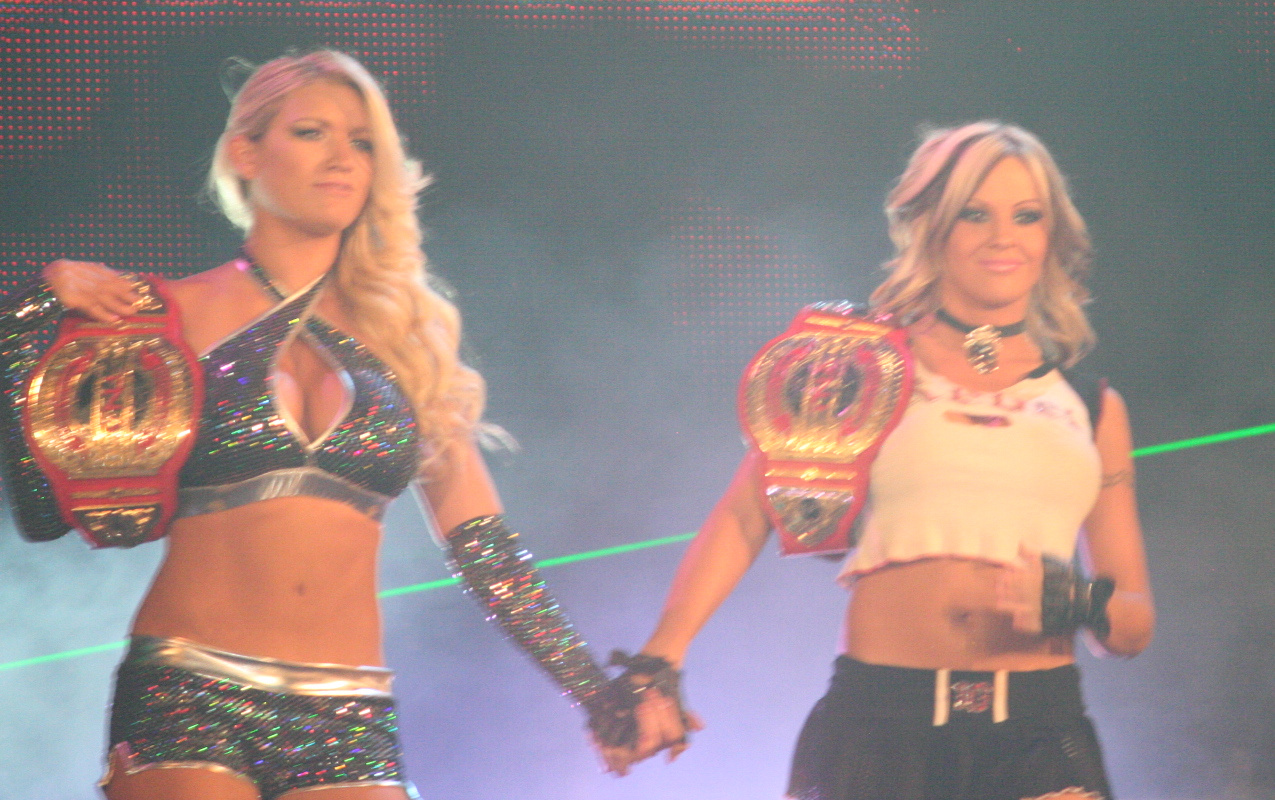
Von Erich and Velvet Sky in July 2010

On July 11 at Victory Road, Madison Rayne lost her TNA Knockouts Championship to Angelina Love by disqualification, due to outside interference from a person disguised with a motorcycle helmet. Prior to the match, it was announced that the title would change hands via disqualification, if either Velvet Sky or Lacey Von Erich interfered in the match. On the following episode of Impact!, The Beautiful People imploded, as Sky said she didn't approve of Rayne's recent attitude, behavior, and apparent affiliation with the mystery woman at the pay-per-view, to which Rayne responded by saying that she didn't need Sky anymore. Sky and Von Erich then walked out on Rayne, as she and the mystery woman ganged up on Love. On the July 22 episode of Impact!, the Knockouts Championship was returned to Rayne, when it was declared that there was no proof that the person who had interfered in the match was either Sky or Von Erich. Later that same night, Rayne convinced Von Erich to abandon Sky and leave with her and the mystery woman. On the August 5 episode of Impact!, Von Erich and Sky lost the TNA Knockouts Tag Team Championship to Hamada and Taylor Wilde, when Rayne's and the mystery woman's interference backfired. Later that night, Sky and Rayne were seen fighting backstage, during which Sky shoved Von Erich, who tried to make peace between her teammates, inadvertently knocking her unconscious. The following week, it was announced that Von Erich had suffered a broken cheek bone in the altercation.

Von Erich returned from injury on the September 16 episode of Impact!, teaming with Madison Rayne against Wilde and Hamada for the TNA Knockouts Tag Team Championship. Von Erich and Rayne were unsuccessful in regaining the championships, after which Von Erich was attacked by Rayne and Tara, before being saved by Velvet Sky and Angelina Love, thus turning Von Erich into a fan favorite. On the September 23 episode of Impact!, Von Erich teamed with Sky against Wilde and Hamada for the TNA Knockouts Tag Team Championship, but were unsuccessful in regaining the championships, after Rayne hit Von Erich with the motorcycle helmet. On the October 14 episode of Impact!, Von Erich appeared in an in-ring segment with Love, Sky and Jersey Shore cast member and guest star Jennifer "JWoww" Farley, where they attacked Cookie and Robbie E. On the October 28 episode of Impact!, it was announced that Von Erich had agreed to train Miss Tessmacher to wrestle, after her stable mates had turned her down the previous week. However, on November 11, 2010, the angle ended abruptly when Adkisson announced her departure from TNA.

== Other media ==
On January 25, 2010, Adkisson was a guest on the weekly "Right After Wrestling" radio program on Hardcore Sports Radio on SIRIUS Radio Channel 98 with host Arda Ocal. In November 2010, she was a contestant on an all TNA week of Family Feud, teaming with Angelina Love, Christy Hemme, Tara and Velvet Sky against Jay Lethal, Matt Morgan, Mick Foley, Mr. Anderson and Rob Van Dam.

From 2008 to 2010, Adkisson was a regular contributor to the wrestling podcast, False Count Radio.

In 2011, Adkisson was featured in the critically acclaimed documentary Card Subject to Change.

In 2021, Adkisson became a part-owner of SWE Fury along business partner Tom Lance. SWE Fury is a Texas-based promotion billed as delivering "in-your-face, Texas-style wrestling."

== Personal life ==
Adkisson is a member of the Von Erich family. Her grandfather was Fritz Von Erich, and she is the daughter of Kerry Von Erich and cousin of Marshall Von Erich and Ross Von Erich. She has an older sister named Hollie. She has three children: a daughter and two sons. Adkisson runs her own advertising company in Southern California. In early 2009, she was diagnosed with meningitis after complaining of a migraine but made a full recovery.

== Championships and accomplishments ==
- Total Nonstop Action Wrestling
  - TNA Knockouts Tag Team Championship (1 time) – with Velvet Sky and Madison Rayne (Note: Von Erich defended the title with either Rayne or Sky under the Freebird Rule.)
- Windy City Pro Wrestling
  - WCPW Ladies Championship (1 time)
