= April Hunter =

American actress (born 1970's)

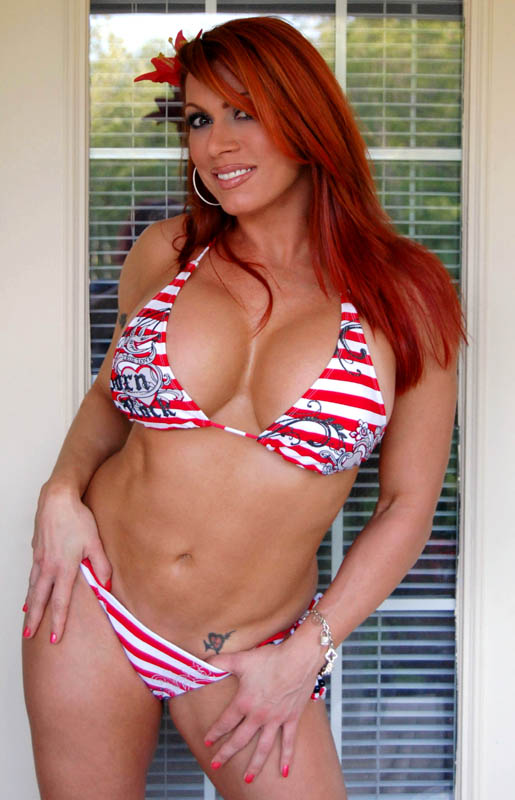
- Hunter in 2010

Personal information
- Born: September 24, 1974 (age 52) Philadelphia, Pennsylvania, U.S.
- Education: New England School of Photography

Professional wrestling career
- Ring name(s): April Hunter; April Kincaid; Beautiful Soldier; Big Red; The Prize
- Billed height: 5 ft 9 in (175 cm)
- Billed weight: 150 lb (68 kg)
- Billed from: Philadelphia, Pennsylvania
- Trained by: Killer Kowalski
- Debut: 1999
- Retired: 2014

April Hunter (born September 24, 1974) is an American retired professional wrestler, professional wrestling valet, boxer, actress, writer, fitness model and glamour model. She has appeared in publications including MuscleMag International and Playboy and has her own comic book series titled Code Red.

== Professional wrestling career ==
=== World Championship Wrestling (1999–2000) ===
In 1999, after Hunter appeared in Playboy magazine, she was hired by World Championship Wrestling (WCW). Along with four other models (Midajah, Major Gunns, Pamela Paulshock and Shakira), she accompanied members of the New World Order (nWo) to ringside for their matches.

=== Independent circuit (2001–2002) ===
Hunter trained to become a professional wrestler with Killer Kowalski in Boston. She was the only woman in the class and soon began working on the independent circuit and overseas.

=== NWA Total Nonstop Action (2002, 2003) ===
On August 28, 2002, Hunter appeared for Total Nonstop Action Wrestling (TNA). She was introduced (and defeated) by then-Miss TNA Bruce as part of his Miss TNA Challenge. She returned for several other appearances in TNA, including matches against Desire, Eric Watts and R. J. Brewer.

=== Independent circuit (2002–2009) ===
Hunter formed a tag team with fellow Kowalski graduate Nikki Roxx in World Xtreme Wrestling; the pair were known as The Killer Babes. She then worked as the manager for Slyck Wagner Brown. Together they held both Pro-Pain Pro Wrestling's 3PW Tag Team Championship and Jersey All Pro Wrestling's JAPW Tag Team Championship. Hunter was the first woman in pro wrestling history to hold the (male) tag team title.

Hunter traveled to Canada for the first time in December 2005, working for Action Wrestling Entertainment and wrestling against Sarah Stock. In February 2006, Hunter worked for Carmen Electra's Naked Women's Wrestling League (NWWL). While in the NWWL Hunter broke her nose, which limited the moves she could perform while working for the promotion.

In Women's Extreme Wrestling (WEW) in April 2006, Hunter formed a tag team known as T & A with Talia Madison. On April 6, they defeated Team Blondage (Amber O'Neal and Lollipop) for the WEW Tag Team Championship. A month later, Hunter and J.D. Maverick debuted together for TNT Pro Wrestling. In September, Hunter challenged Madison for her TNT Women's Championship. She defeated Madison for the title on September 23. During her time in TNT, Hunter appeared in the Glamour, Glitz & Divas—The Untold Story of American Women's Wrestling DVD, alongside Madison and Michaels.

Hunter won Queens of Chaos's World Queens of Chaos Championship in November 2006 by defeating Sweet Saraya in the final round of a championship tournament. She vacated the title on In May 2012. She also won Great Canadian Wrestling's GCW W.I.L.D. Championship from Miss Danyah on April 13, 2007. She held the title for one day before losing it to Cherry Bomb in a four-way match. Because of wrestling-related injuries, Hunter retired from professional wrestling later in the year.

=== Total Nonstop Action Wrestling (2009) ===
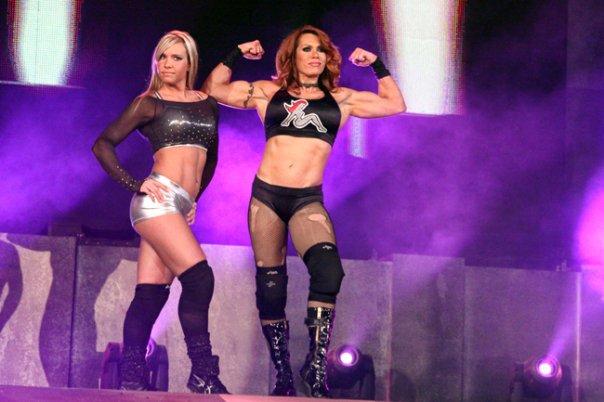
Hunter (right) with Lorelei on TNA Impact! in 2009.

Hunter turned heel in her return to TNA on the December 31, 2009 edition of Impact!, teaming with the evil Lorelei Lee in a losing effort against TNA Knockouts Tag Team Champions Sarita and Taylor Wilde. On June 15, 2010, Hunter claimed that she had turned down a contract offer from TNA the previous month.

=== Later career (2009–2014) ===
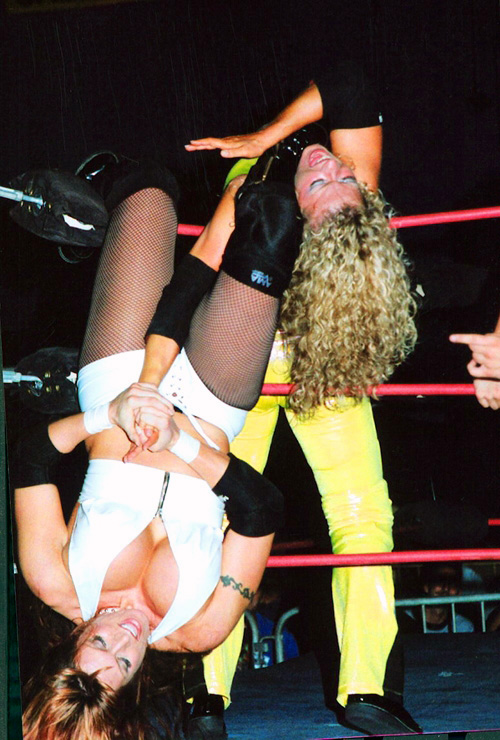
Hunter applying the Hunter's Hangman in 2010.

In late 2009, Hunter returned to the ring from retirement. Her mother was diagnosed with stage four cancer and her return to the ring was prompted by her wanting to help out financially. Hunter toured Europe with American Rampage Wrestling in November and December 2009 with Rob Van Dam, Sid Vicious and Sabu.

Hunter was part of the AWR (American Wrestling Rampage) European Tour in November 2010 in France with Booker T, Sandman, Scott Steiner and Kai.

On September 21, 2012, Hunter debuted for Shine Wrestling's SHINE 3 event as the villainous manager of Made In Sin (Allysin Kay and Taylor Made). All three women would align with Rain and Ivelisse to form the Valkyrie faction at SHINE 6 on January 11, 2013. At SHINE 7 on February 22, Hunter made her in-ring debut for the promotion, teaming with Made In Sin in a victorious outing against Mia Yim, Su Yung and Tracy Taylor.

April Hunter debuted for High Impact Wrestling Canada in August 2014 as part of the "Tour De Rumble" that featured events throughout Central Canada. She appeared at eight events during the tour.

== Other media ==
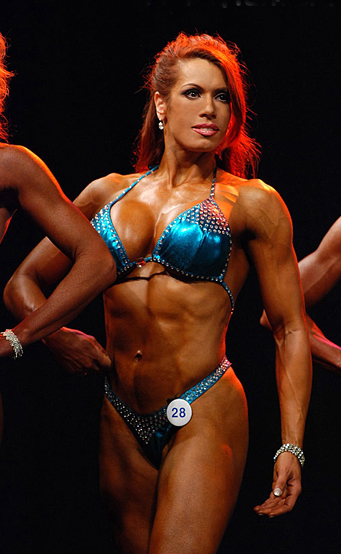
Hunter posing in a fitness competition.

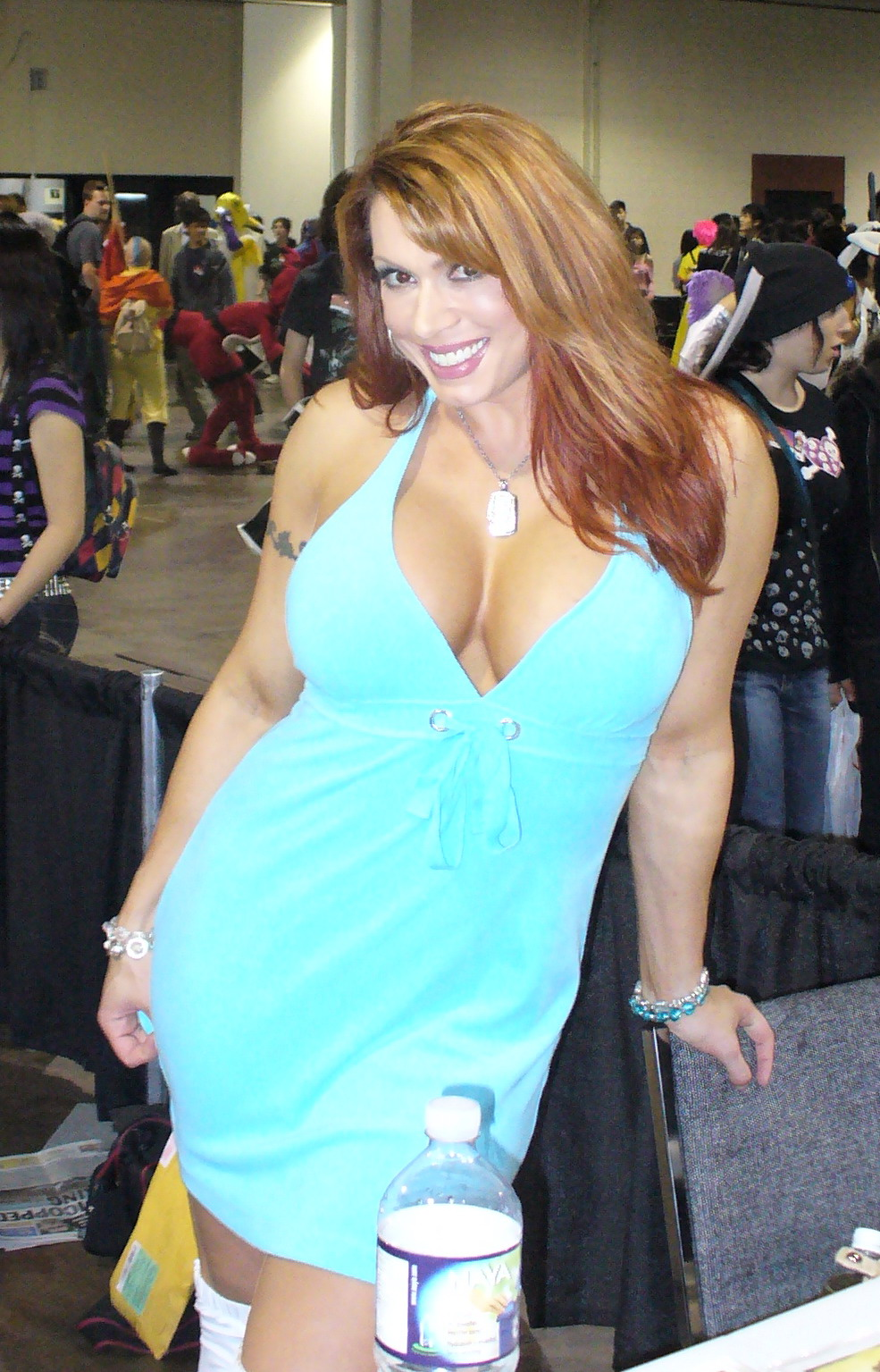
Hunter at an anime convention in 2008.

Hunter competed in Muscle and Fitness competitions in 2009 and placed third in her first National Physique Committee-sanctioned figure competition November 14, 2009. She then competed in Figure on June 18, 2010, at the Junior Nationals in Chicago.

Hunter has appeared in the films Oh! My Zombie Mermaid (2004) and Just Another Romantic Wrestling Comedy (2007). In the United Kingdom, she has appeared on the James Whale Show, and in Japan, she appeared in a Toyota Fun Cargo TV commercial. In the United States, she appeared in an MSNBC documentary entitled Body of Work, on The Howard Stern Show, and in the video for The Outhere Brothers' "Boom Boom Boom"/"Don't Stop (Wiggle Wiggle)." She appeared in a W-FIVE documentary in Canada, TruTV's Most Daring Wild Women and several independent films, including Ultimate Death Match II and Hell House in 2009/2010.

In 2012, Hunter appeared in horror film The Meat Puppet playing the role of "Jade" For her performance she was nominated for Best Supporting Actress, Feature Drama in the Downbeach Film Festival.

In 2013 Hunter appeared in the film Gravedigger, playing the role of Marie Spiegel.

Hunter is featured in a line of comic books with the titles Code Red, Code Red II, Stripper Viking, and Stripper Viking II. She is also featured in various trading cards and art, comics, and books by Jay E. Fife, Scott Blair, Monte Moore, Julie Strain and Boris Vallejo. In 2013 Hunter was one of several models chosen to work with artist George Pérez on his new comic, Sirens. She served as the model for the character "Agony".

In 2013, Hunter started a blog she titled "Putting The Clothes On, Taking The Gloves Off".

Starting in 2013 she started making appearances at horror, science fiction, and comic book conventions cosplaying as various characters. Her cosplay costumes have featured Phoenix, Black Widow, a female version of The Punisher, Poison Ivy, Wonder Woman and Red Sonja.

== Personal life ==
Hunter is of German, Scottish and Italian descent. She was born in Philadelphia, Pennsylvania, but moved to Enterprise, Alabama with her father when her parents divorced. Before entering the world of professional wrestling, Hunter worked as a fitness model. She placed in Ms. Fitness Philadelphia and Ironwoman Tri-Fitness in Tampa, Florida. She also worked as a Playboy model and Met-Rx spokesperson.

On August 30, 2006, Hunter married Canadian wrestler Jordan Danyluk (known as J.D. Maverick) in Las Vegas, Nevada. They first met at a wrestling show in December 2005 and were engaged after Valentine's Day in 2006. The two have since divorced.

She studied photography at the New England School of Photography.

== Championships and accomplishments ==
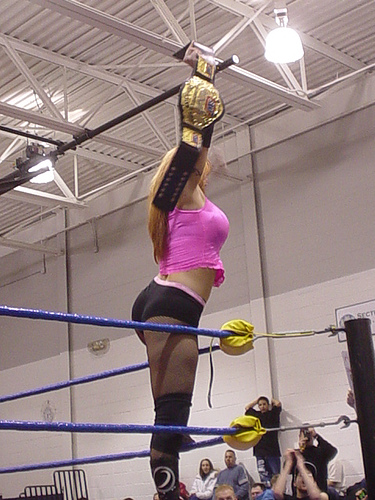
Hunter as the NWA Cyberspace Women's Champion in March 2005.

- Far North Wrestling
  - FNW Women's Championship (1 time)
- German Stampede Wrestling
  - GSW World Women's Championship (1 time)
- Great Canadian Wrestling
  - GCW W.I.L.D. Championship (1 time)
- Jersey All Pro Wrestling
  - JAPW Tag Team Championship (1 time) – with Slyck Wagner Brown
- Jersey Championship Wrestling
  - JCW Women's Championship (1 time)
- NWA Cyberspace
  - NWA Cyberspace Women's Championship (1 time)
- Pro-Pain Pro Wrestling
  - 3PW Tag Team Championship (1 time) – with Slyck Wagner Brown
  - Tag Team Royal Rumble (2004) – with Slyck Wagner Brown
- Pro Wrestling Illustrated
  - Ranked No. 18 of the top 50 female wrestlers in the PWI Female 50 in 2008
- Queens of Chaos
  - World Queens of Chaos Championship (1 time)
- USA Pro Wrestling
  - USA Pro Women's Championship (1 time)
- Women's Extreme Wrestling
  - WEW World Tag Team Championship – with Talia Madison
- Women Superstars Uncensored
  - WSU Hall of Fame (Class of 2011)
- World Xtreme Wrestling
  - WXW Women's Championship (1 time)
  - Women's Super 8 Tournament (2003)
