= List of former Total Nonstop Action Wrestling personnel =

Total Nonstop Action Wrestling (TNA) is an American professional wrestling promotion based in Nashville, Tennessee. Former employees in TNA consist of professional wrestlers, managers, play-by-play and color commentators, announcers, interviewers, referees, trainers, script writers, executives, and board of directors. In the case of wrestlers originating from Spanish-speaking countries, who most often have two surnames, the paternal (first) surname is used.

TNA talent contracts range from developmental contracts to multi-year deals. They primarily appeared on TNA television programming, pay-per-views, monthly specials, and live events, and talent with developmental contracts appeared at Border City Wrestling and Ohio Valley Wrestling. When talent is released of their contract, it could be for a budget cut, the individual asking for their release, for personal reasons, time off from an injury, or retirement.

Those who made appearances without a contract and those who were previously released but are currently employed by TNA are not included.

== Lists of former personnel ==
These lists of personnel are sorted by the first letter of the wrestlers' family name:

- List of former Total Nonstop Action Wrestling personnel (A–C)
- List of former Total Nonstop Action Wrestling personnel (D–H)
- List of former Total Nonstop Action Wrestling personnel (I–M)
- List of former Total Nonstop Action Wrestling personnel (N–R)
- List of former Total Nonstop Action Wrestling personnel (S–Z)

== See also ==
- List of Total Nonstop Action Wrestling personnel
- List of former championships in Total Nonstop Action Wrestling
