= List of former Total Nonstop Action Wrestling personnel (N–R) =

Total Nonstop Action Wrestling is a professional wrestling company based in Nashville, Tennessee. Former employees (family name letters N–R) in TNA consist of professional wrestlers, managers, play-by-play and color commentators, announcers, interviewers, referees, trainers, script writers, executives, and board of directors. In the case of wrestlers originating from Spanish-speaking countries, who most often have two surnames, the paternal (first) surname is used.

TNA talent contracts range from developmental contracts to multi-year deals. They primarily appeared on TNA television programming, pay-per-views, monthly specials, and live events, and talent with developmental contracts appeared at Border City Wrestling and Ohio Valley Wrestling. When talent is released of their contract, it could be for a budget cut, the individual asking for their release, for personal reasons, time off from an injury, or retirement.

Those who made appearances without a contract and those who were previously released but are currently employed by TNA are not included.

== Alumni (N–R) ==
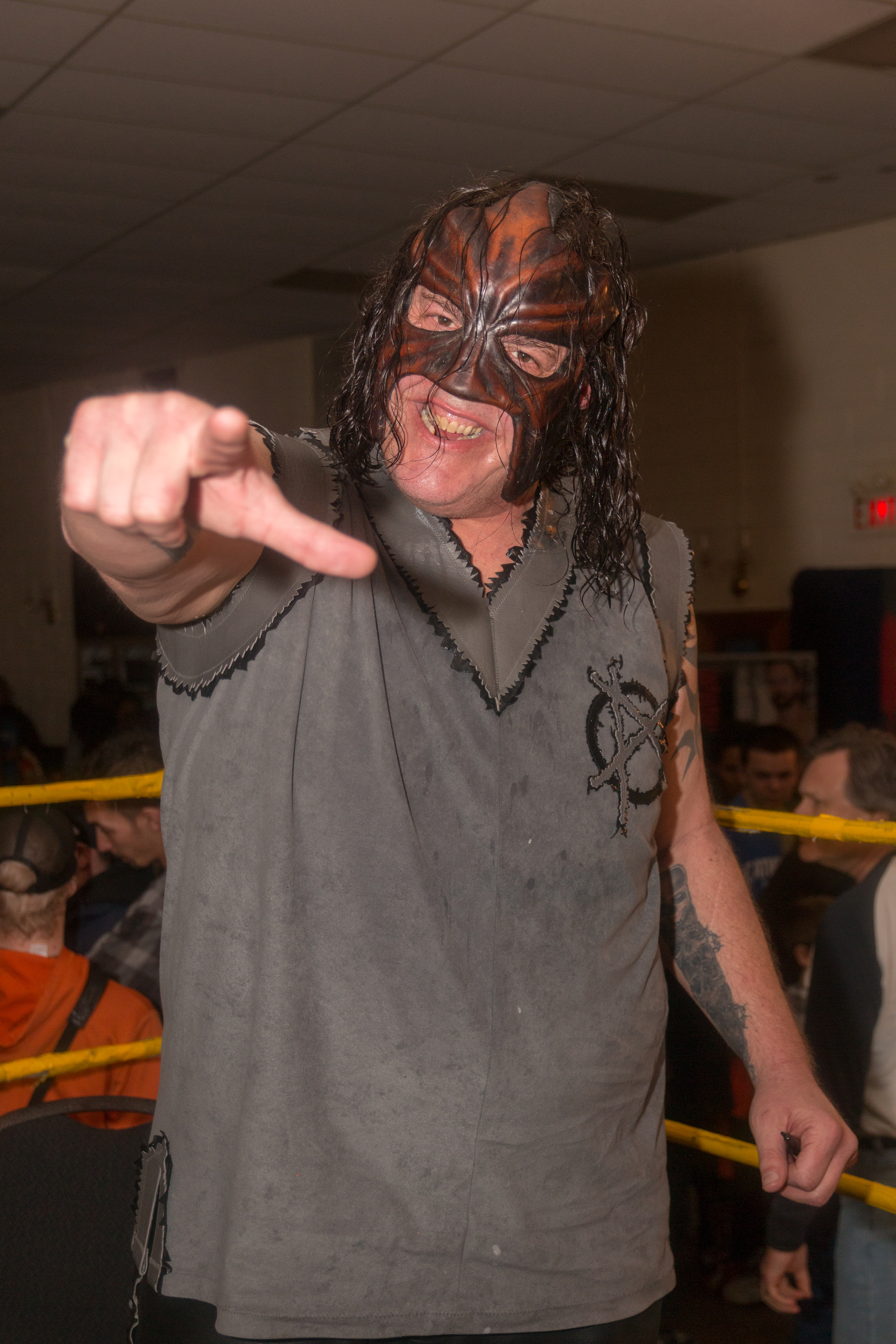
Abyss

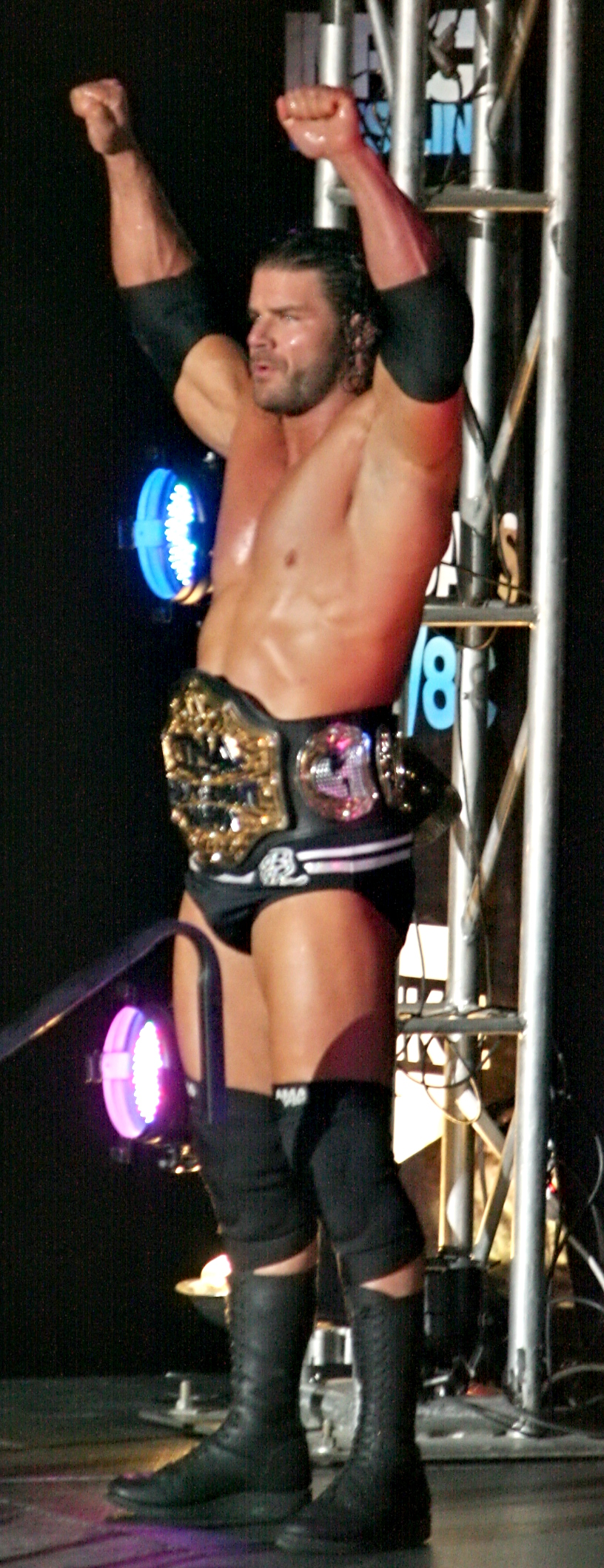
Bobby Roode

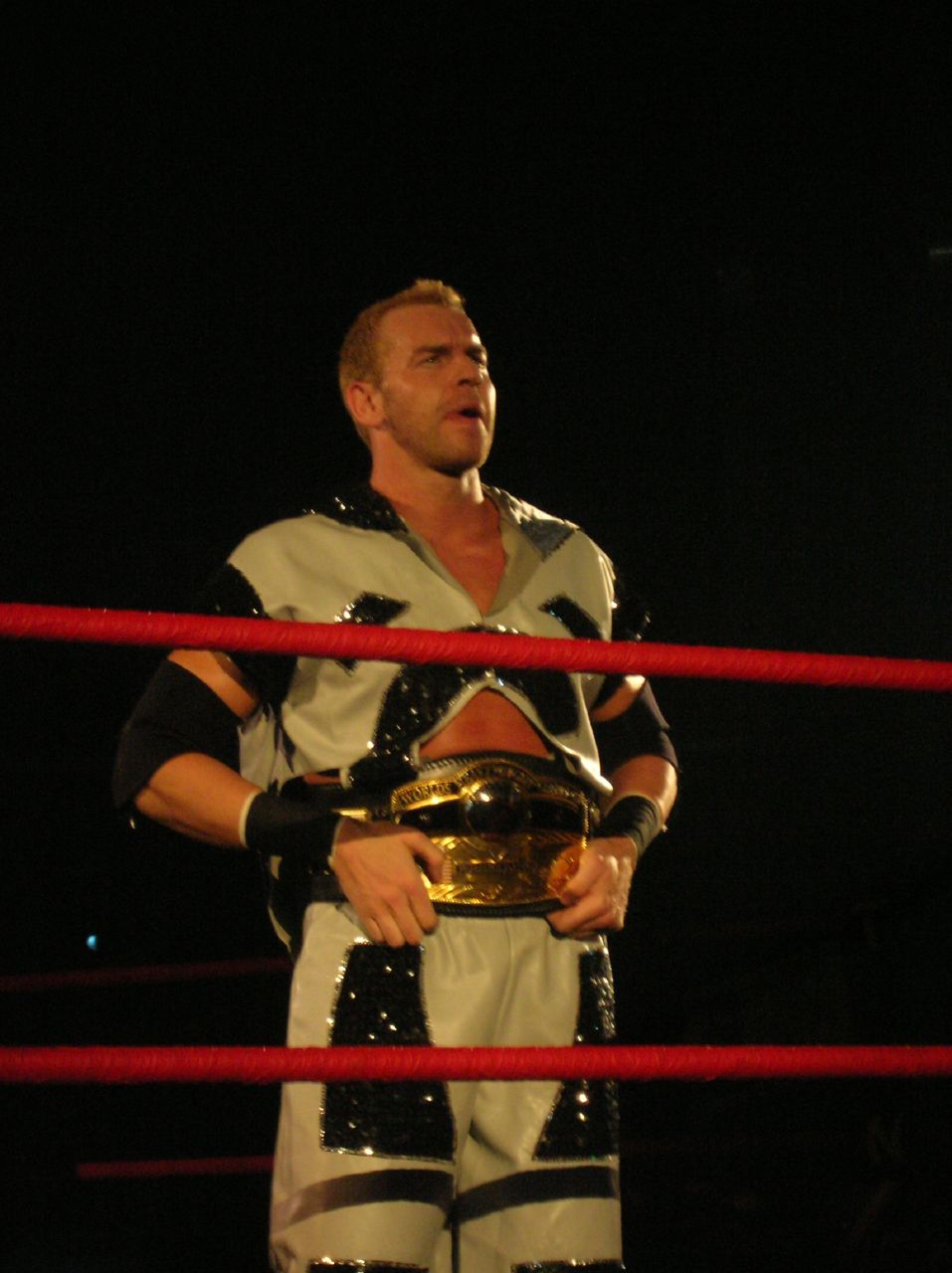
Christian Cage

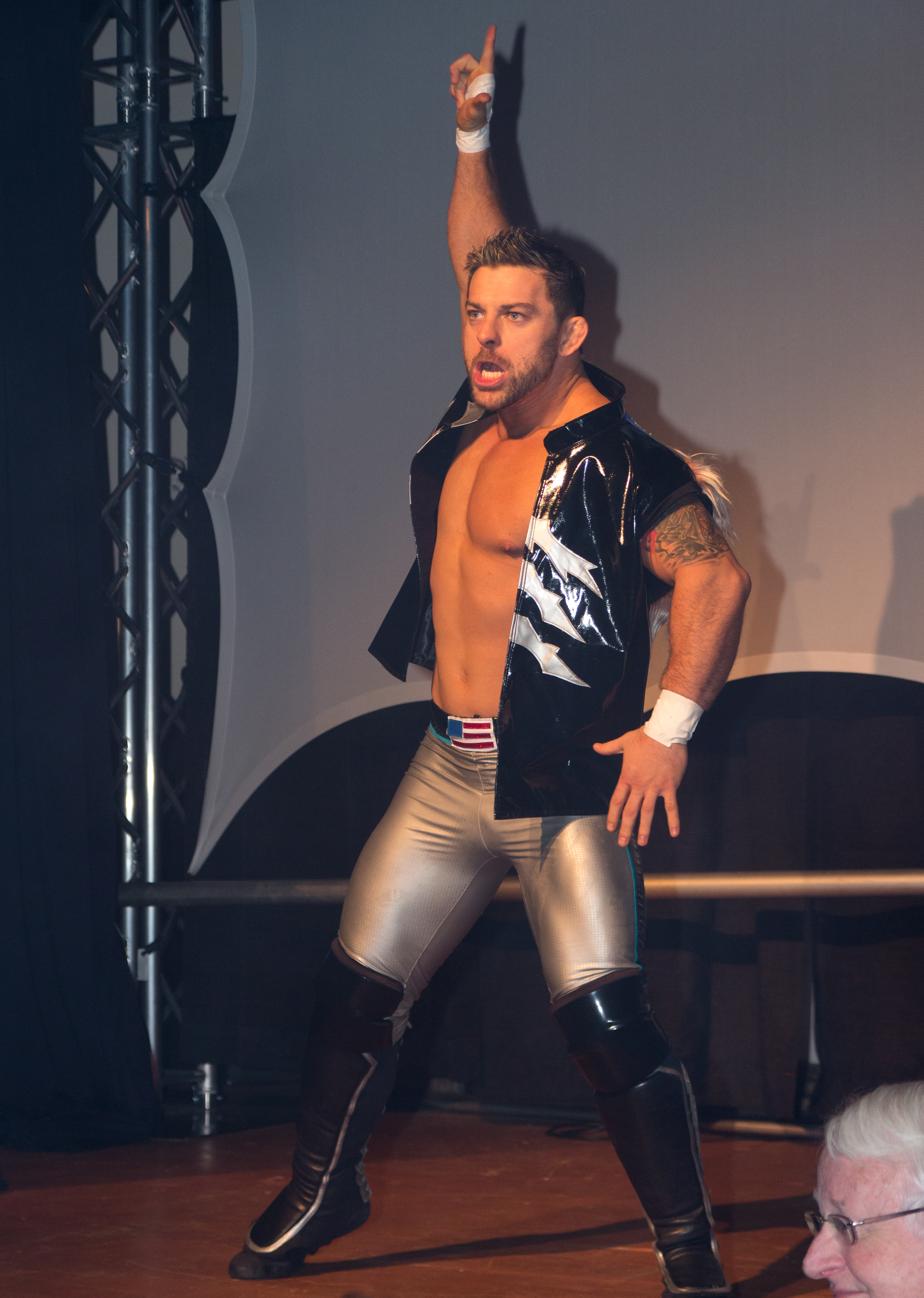
Davey Richards

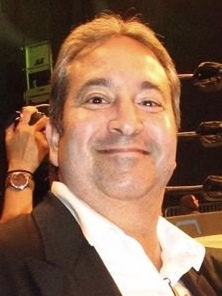
David Penzer

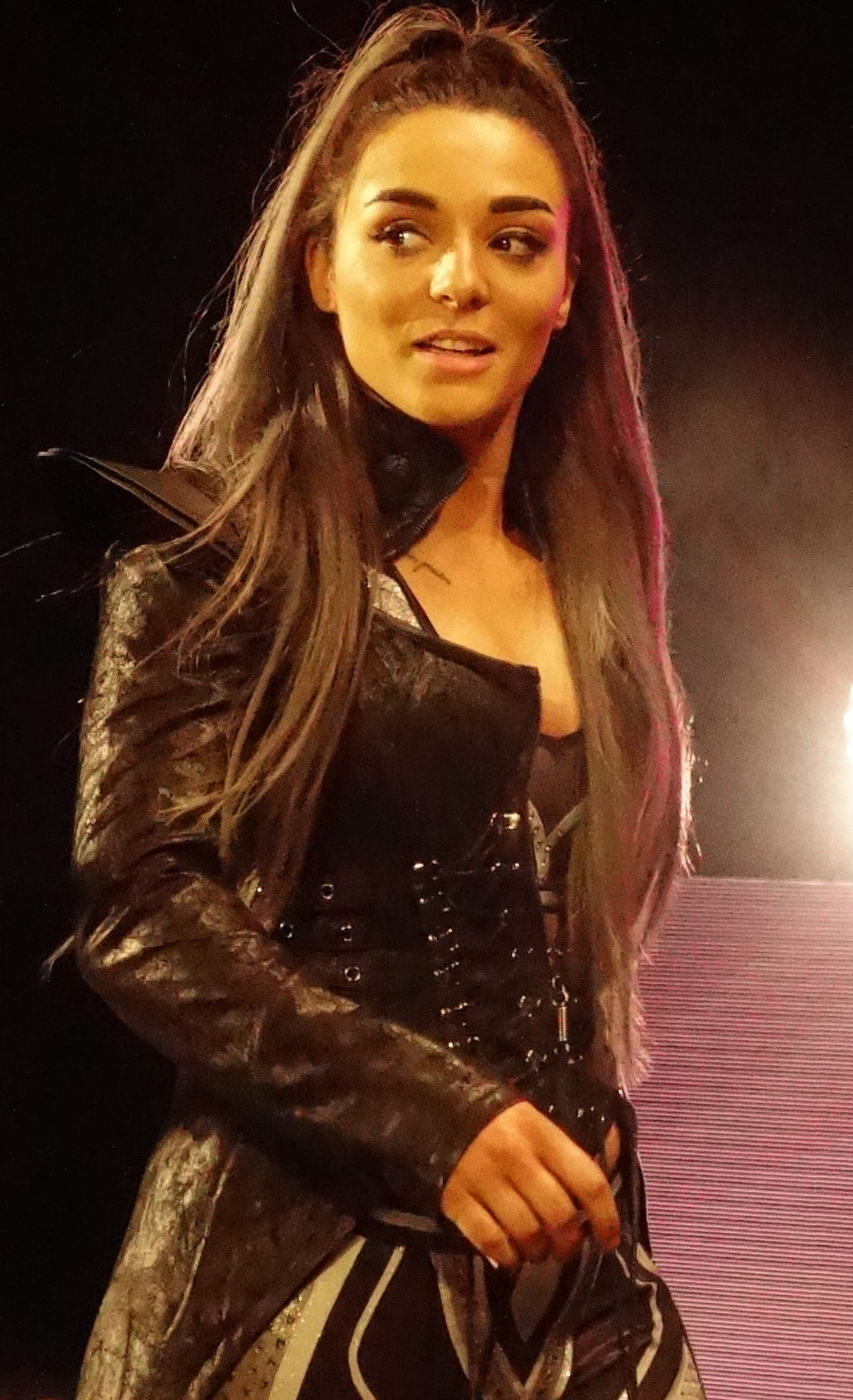
Deonna Purrazzo

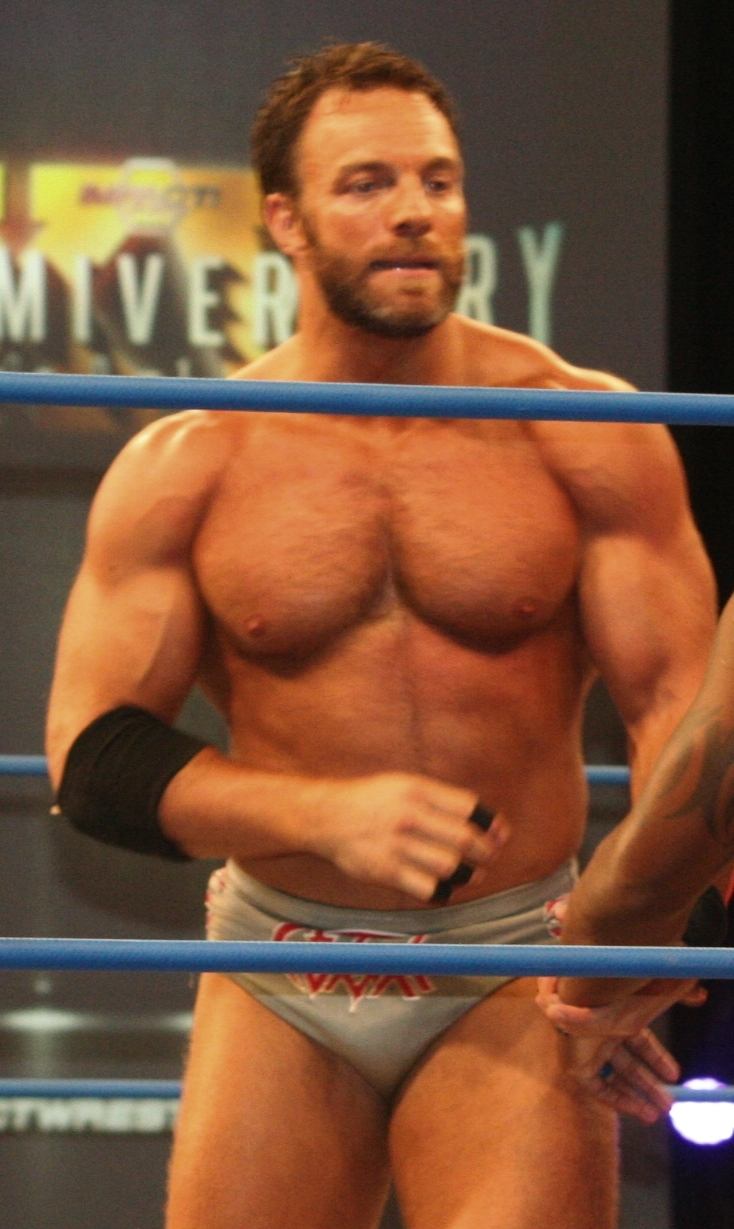
Eli Drake

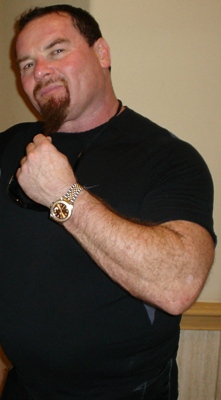
Jim Neidhart

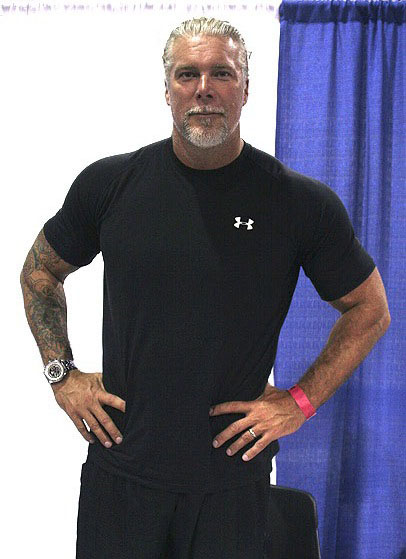
Kevin Nash

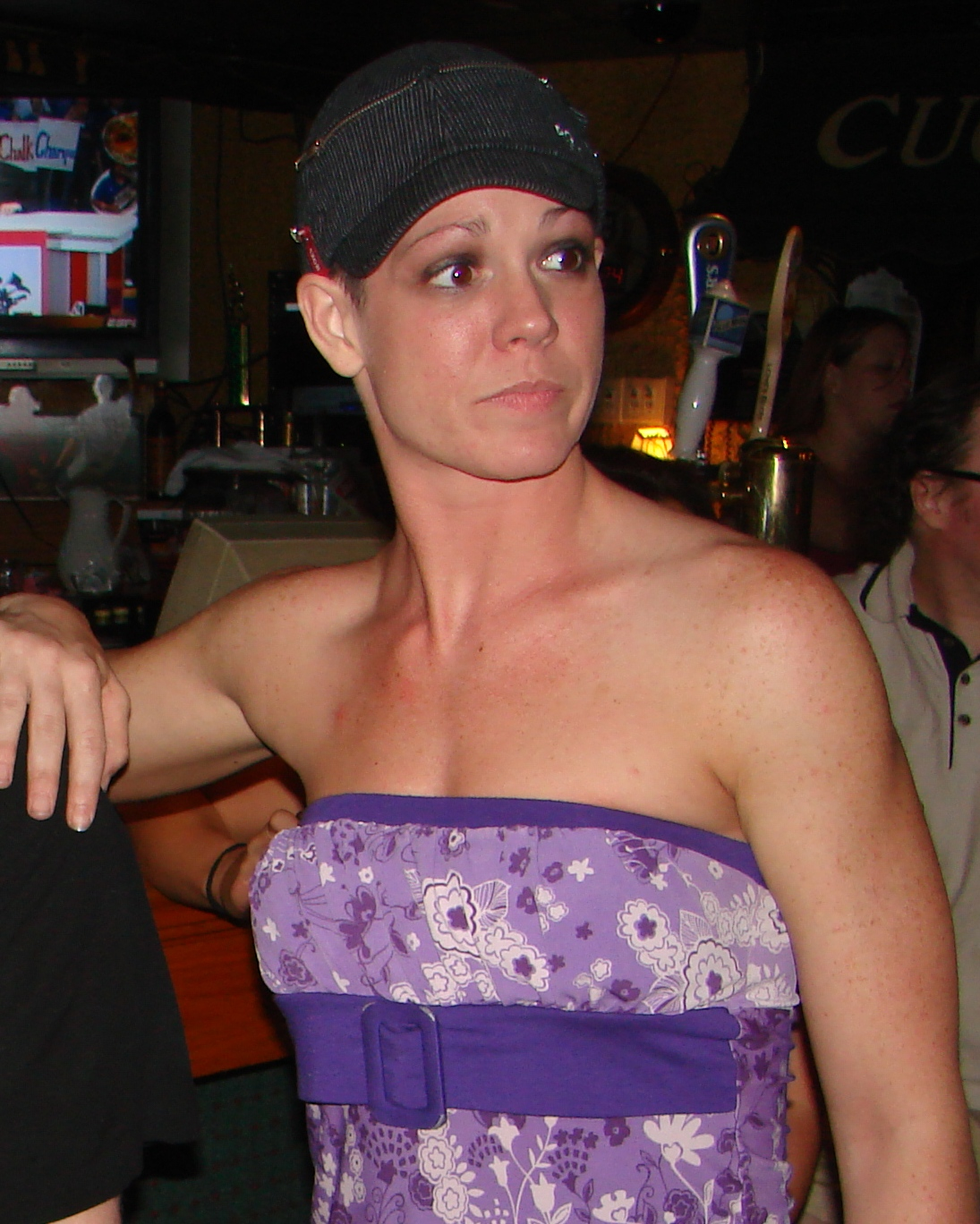
Roxxi

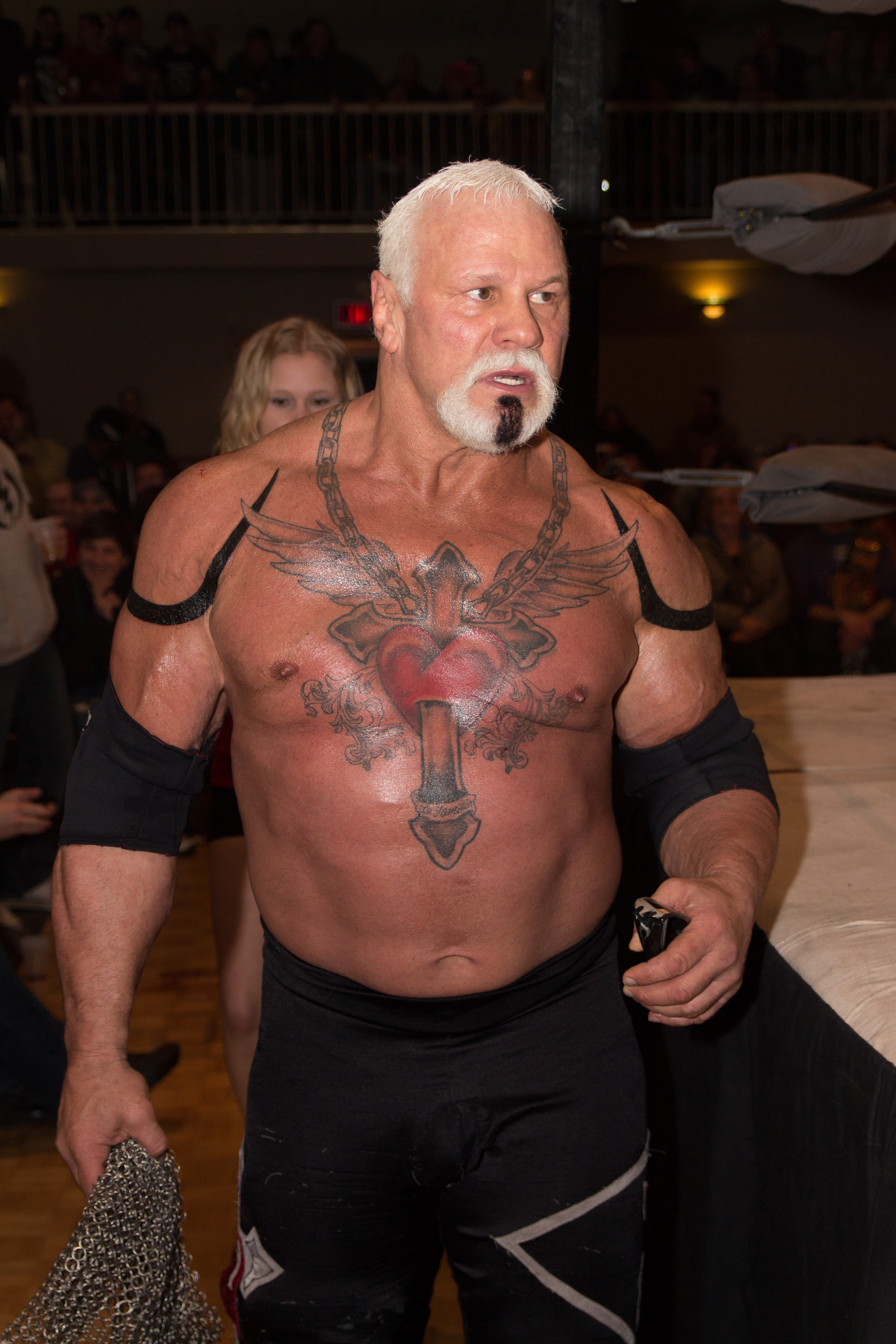
Scott Steiner

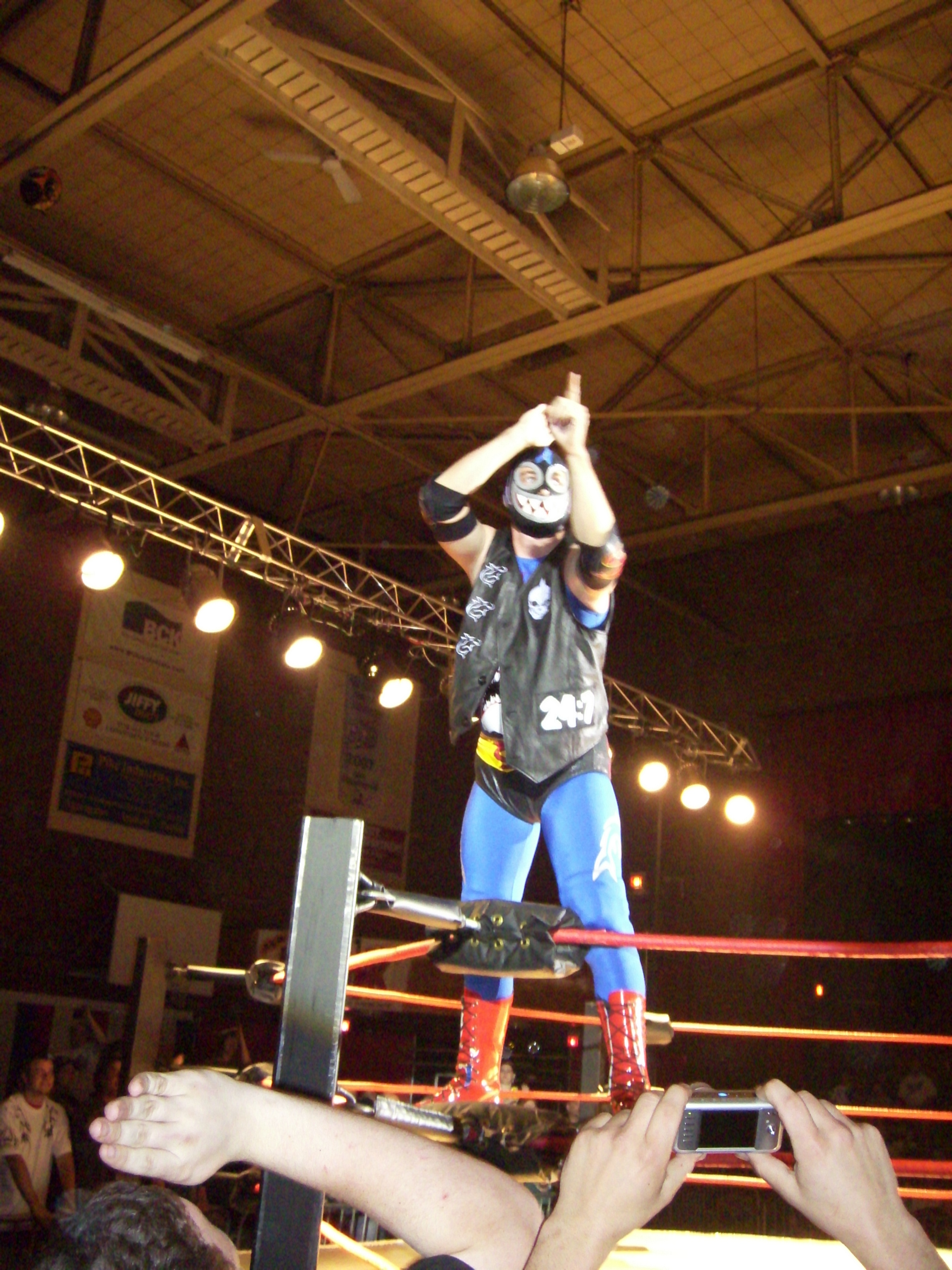
Shark Boy

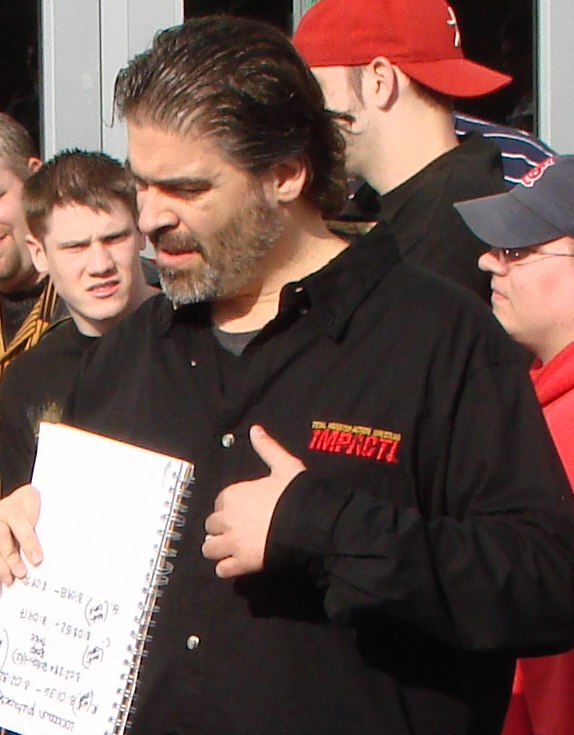
Vince Russo

Birth name	Ring name(s)	Tenure	Ref
Unknown	Trix Nasty	2003	
Unknown	Neico	2010	
Unknown	Niya	2011	
Unknown	Scott Papper	2004	
Unknown	Shawn Parks	2003	
Unknown	Rank	2003	
Unknown	Rocky Reynolds	2003	
Unknown	Rusty Riddle	2002	
Unknown	The Rocker	2003	
Unknown	Russ Rollins	2004	
Unknown	Sean Royal	2002	
Unknown	Rocky Santiago	2010	
Unknown	Rod Steele	2004; 2006	
Tetsuya Naito	Naito	2009	
Shinsuke Nakamura	Shinsuke Nakamura	2008	
Kevin Nash	Kevin Nash; Chet Lemon; Dr. Nash	2004–2010	
Jesse Neal	Jesse Neal	2009–2011	
Jim Neidhart †	Jim Neidhart	2009	
Joseph Nelson	Chance Prophet	2003; 2004	
Timothy Nelson	Rashad Cameron	2012; 2013	
Anthony Nese	Anthony Nese; Tony Nese	2011–2012	
Devon Nicholson	Hannibal	2007; 2010	
Kim Nielsen	Desire	2004	
Ronald Niemi	Ron Niemi	2002–2003; 2007	
Kevin Northcutt	Kevin Northcutt; Kenny Northcutt	2003	
Edward Nordholm	Ed Nordholm	2017–2024	
Kazushige Nosawa	Nosawa	2003; 2004	
Reyes Nunez	Ricky Reyes	2011	
Kazuchika Okada	Kazuchika Okada; Okada; Okato	2010–2011	
Miguel Olivo	Daga	2019–2020	
Dale Oliver	Dale Oliver	2002–2018	
Takao Omori	Takao Omori	2002	
Scott Oplinger	Scotty Sabre	2003	
Arturo Ortiz	Rey Bucanero	2008	
Michael Owens	Flex	2002	
Federico Palacios	Federico Palacios	2011	
Andrés Palomeque †	Abismo Negro	2004	
Chad Parham	Gabriel	2002; 2004	
Pagal Parinda	Vikas Kumar	2017–2019	
Michael Paris	DJZ; DJ Zema; Zema Ion	2011–2018	
Christopher Park	Abyss; Joseph Park; Justice	2002–2019	
Frank Parker	Frank Parker	2002	
John Parsonage	Johnny Devine; Havok	2004; 2006–2008; 2013	
Manuel Partida	Halloween	2003	
Russell Payne Jr.	B.J. Payne	2003	
Antonio Peña †	Antonio Peña	2004	
April Pennington	April Pennington	2002; 2003	
David Penzer	David Penzer	2006–2010; 2017; 2020–2023	
Melina Perez	Melina	2021	
Lawrence Pfohl	Lex Luger	2003; 2004; 2006	
William Pierce	Chris Michaels	2003; 2004	
A. J. Pierzynski	A.J. Pierzynski	2005; 2007	
Alexis Pillman †	Lexi Pillman	2008	
Angelina Pivarnick	Angelina; Angelina Pivarnick	2011	
Jacus Plisken	Jaykus Plisken	2010	
Randy Poffo †	Randy Savage	2004–2005	
Peter Polaco	Justin Credible; P.J. Polaco	2003; 2005; 2010	
Mike Polchlopek	Mike Barton	2003	
Matt Polinsky	Sterling James Keenan	2011	
Lorenzo Poppa	Lorenzo Poppa	2003	
Jason Porcaro	Jason Porcaro	2003; 2004	
Mike Posey	Mike Posey	2003–2008	
Dylan Postl	Swoggle	2016–2017; 2019; 2020	
Dave Prazak	Dave Prazak	2003–2004	
Bert Prentice †	Bert Prentice	2003	
Bruce Prichard	Bruce Prichard	2012–2013	
Jamin Pugh †	Jay Briscoe	2002; 2022	
Mark Pugh	Mark Briscoe	2002; 2022	
Andrew Pulido	Lars Only	2012	
Daniel Purham	Danny Dominion	2003	
Deonna Purrazzo	Deonna Purrazzo	2020–2023	
Harley Race †	Harley Race	2002; 2003; 2004; 2007	
Nicole Raczynski	Roxxi Laveaux; Roxxi	2007–2009; 2010; 2011	
Rohit Raju	Hakim Zane; Rohit Raju	2017–2022	
Alastair Ralphs	A-1; Alastair Ralphs	2004–2007	
Julio Ramirez	Jose Maximo	2002–2003	
Kelvin Ramirez	Joel Maximo	2002–2003	
Chasyn Rance	Chasyn Rance	2004; 2007	
Mike Rapada	Mike Rapada	2002	
James Raschke	Baron von Raschke	2010	
Jonathan Rechner †	Balls Mahoney; Kahoneys	2004; 2008; 2009; 2010	
Robert Rechsteiner	Rick Steiner	2002–2003; 2006; 2007–2008	
Scott Rechsteiner	Scott Steiner	2006–2010; 2011–2012; 2017–2020	
Myron Reed	Myron Reed	2023–2026	
Simon Reed	Simon Reed	2003	
Julia Reilly †	Claire Lynch	2012	
James Reiher †	Jimmy Snuka	2004	
Jason Reso	Christian Cage	2005–2009; 2012; 2021	
Wesley Richards	Davey Richards	2014–2017; 2022	
Steve Richardson †	Puppet; Puppet The Psycho Dwarf; Puppet The Midget Killer	2002; 2010	
Willie Richardson Jr.	Willie Richardson	2003	
Shaun Ricker	Eli Drake	2015–2019	
Cassidy Riley	Cassidy Riley; Cassidy O'Reilly	2002–2006	
Salvatore Rinauro	Sal Rinauro; Salvatore Rinauro	2004; 2005; 2007	
Jay Rios	Marty Con; Eduardo Rios; Jose Rios; Hose B Lopez	2010; 2011; 2012	
John Rivera	Black Tiger; Rocky Romero	2006; 2021	
Juan Rivera	Savio Vega	2008–2009	
Steve Robinson	Corporal Robinson	2004; 2008	
Marshe Rockett	Marshe Rockett	2016–2017	
Johnny Rodriguez	Johnny Rodz	2007	
Raymundo Rodríguez †	Piratita Morgan	2004	
Dean Roll	Dean Baldwin; Shark Boy	2002–2011; 2013; 2014; 2015	
Sam Roman	Romeo	2003–2005	
Justin Romero	Acey Romero	2019–2021	
Robert Roode Jr.	Bobby Roode; Robert Roode	2004–2016	
Romeo Roselli	Romeo Roselli	2007	
Fred Rubenstein	Mr. Fred	2003	
Renato Ruiz	Averno	2008	
Cody Runnels	Cody	2016–2017	
Dustin Runnels	Dustin Rhodes; Black Reign	2004–2005; 2007–2008	
Virgil Runnels, Jr. †	Dusty Rhodes; Midnight Rider	2003–2005	
Vince Russo	Vince Russo; Mr. Wrestling III	2002–2004; 2006–2012	
Bob Ryder †	Bob Ryder	2002–2020	

Company name to Year
NWA: Total Nonstop Action	2002–2004
Total Nonstop Action Wrestling	2004–2017, 2024–present
Global Force Wrestling	June–September 2017
Impact Wrestling	March–June 2017, September 2017–January 2024
Notes
† Indicates they are deceased

== See also ==
- List of Total Nonstop Action Wrestling personnel
