= List of former Total Nonstop Action Wrestling personnel (A–C) =

Total Nonstop Action Wrestling is a professional wrestling company based in Nashville, Tennessee, United States. Former employees (family name letters A–C) in TNA consist of professional wrestlers, managers, play-by-play and color commentators, announcers, interviewers, referees, trainers, script writers, executives, and board of directors. In the case of wrestlers originating from Spanish-speaking countries, who most often have two surnames, the paternal (first) surname is used.

TNA talent contracts range from developmental contracts to multi-year deals. They primarily appeared on Impact television programming, pay-per-views, monthly specials, and live events, and talent with developmental contracts appeared at Border City Wrestling and Ohio Valley Wrestling. When talent is released of their contract, it could be for a budget cut, the individual asking for their release, for personal reasons, time off from an injury, or retirement.

Those who made appearances without a contract and those who were previously released but are currently employed by TNA are not included.

== Alumni (A–C) ==
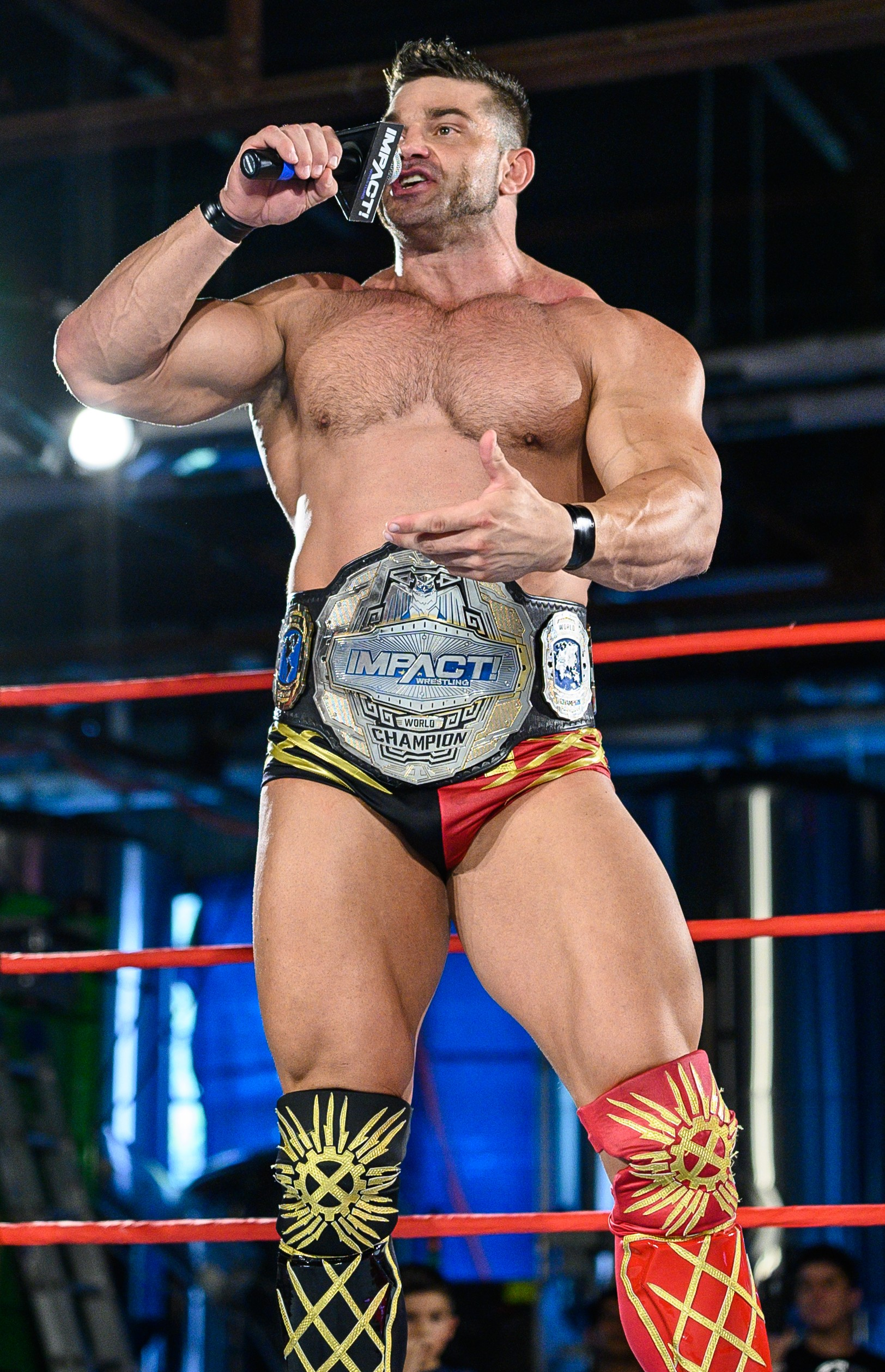
Brian Cage

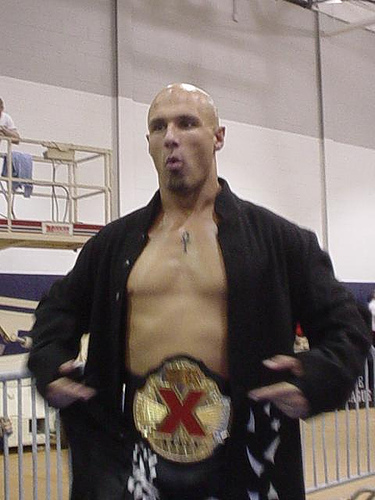
Christopher Daniels

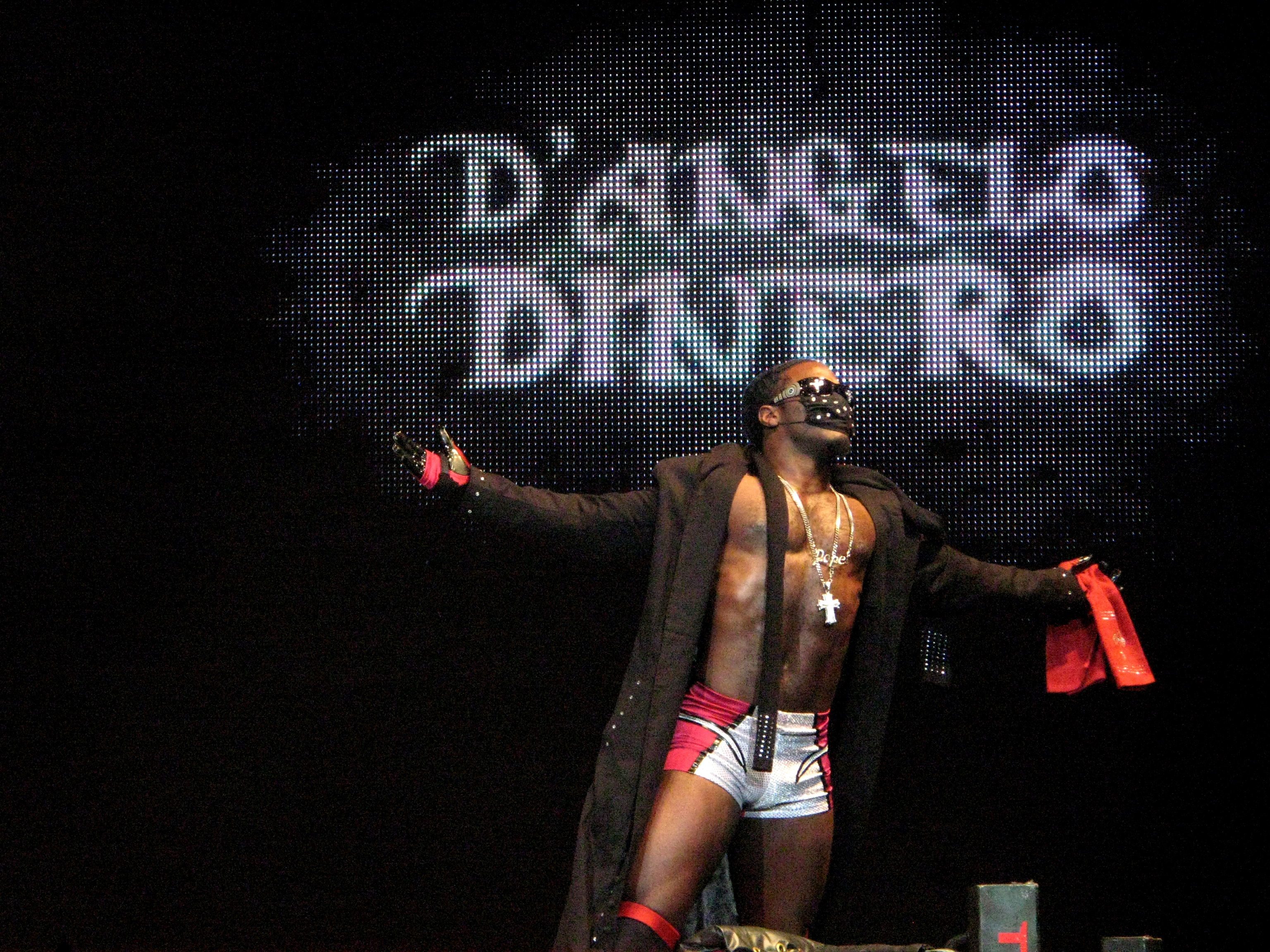
D'Angelo Dinero

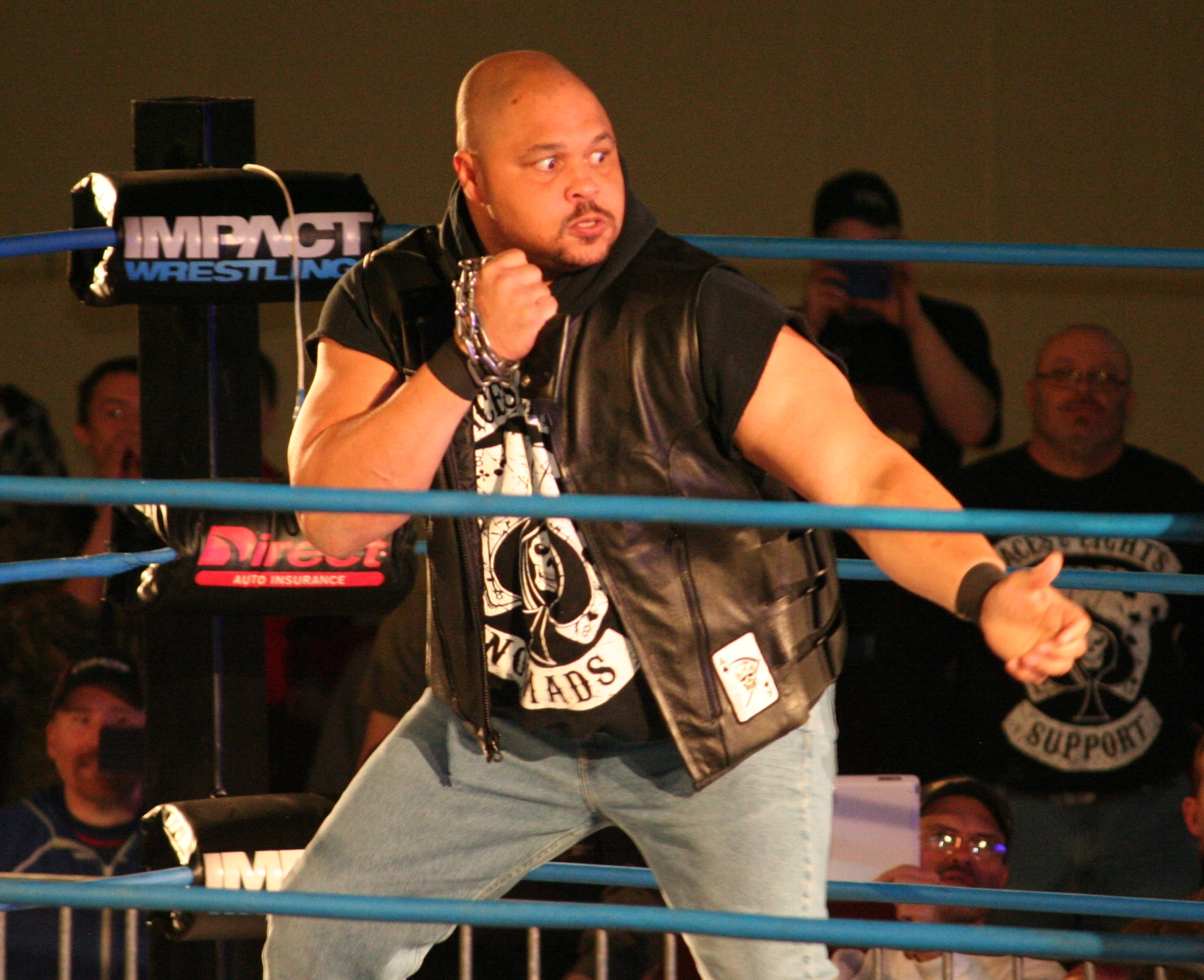
D'Lo Brown

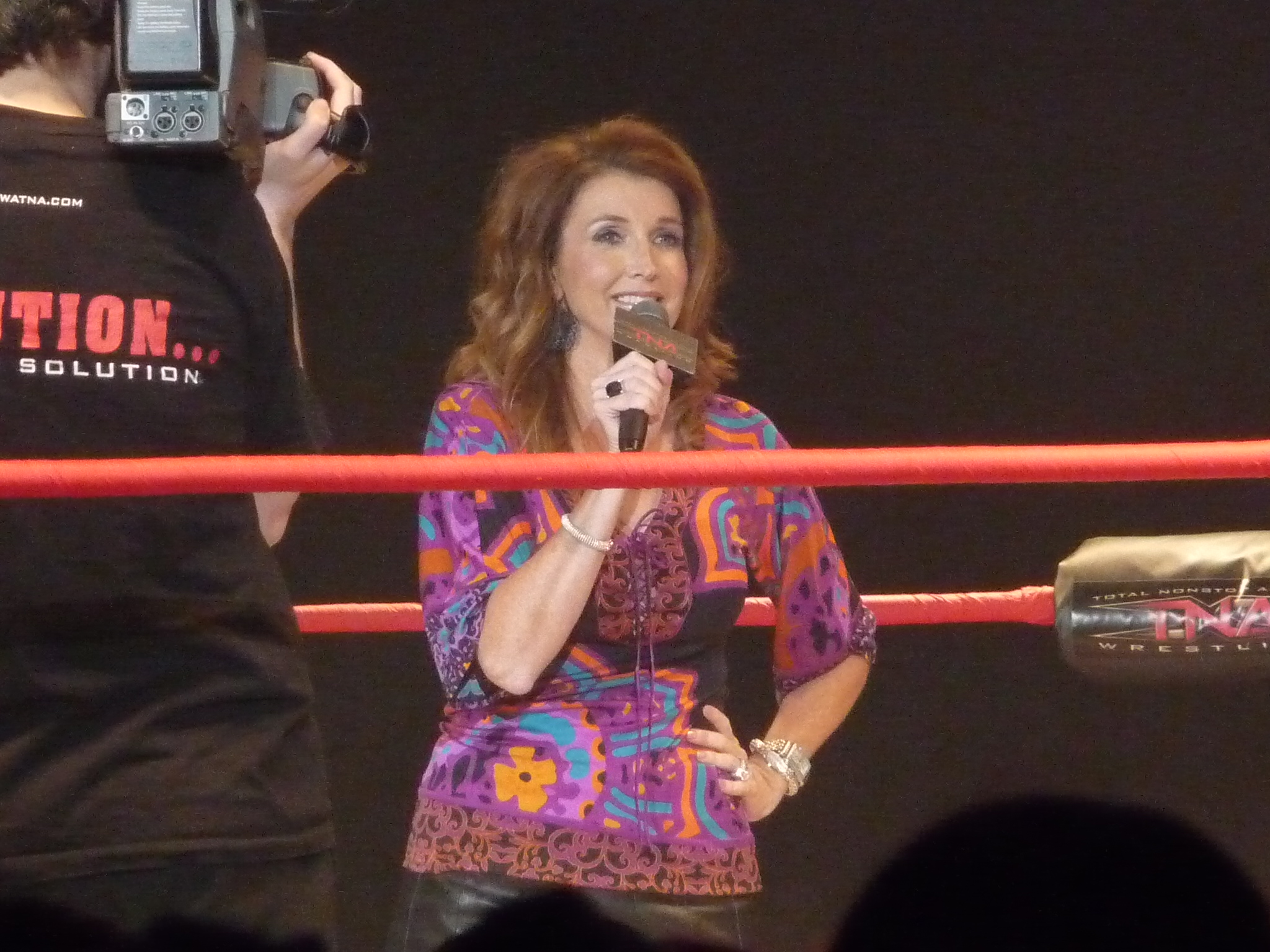
Dixie Carter

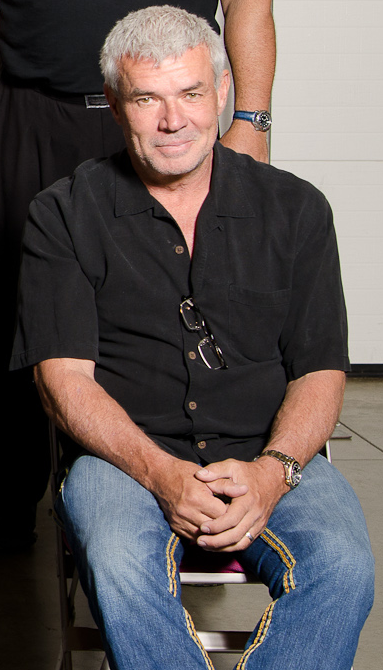
Eric Bischoff

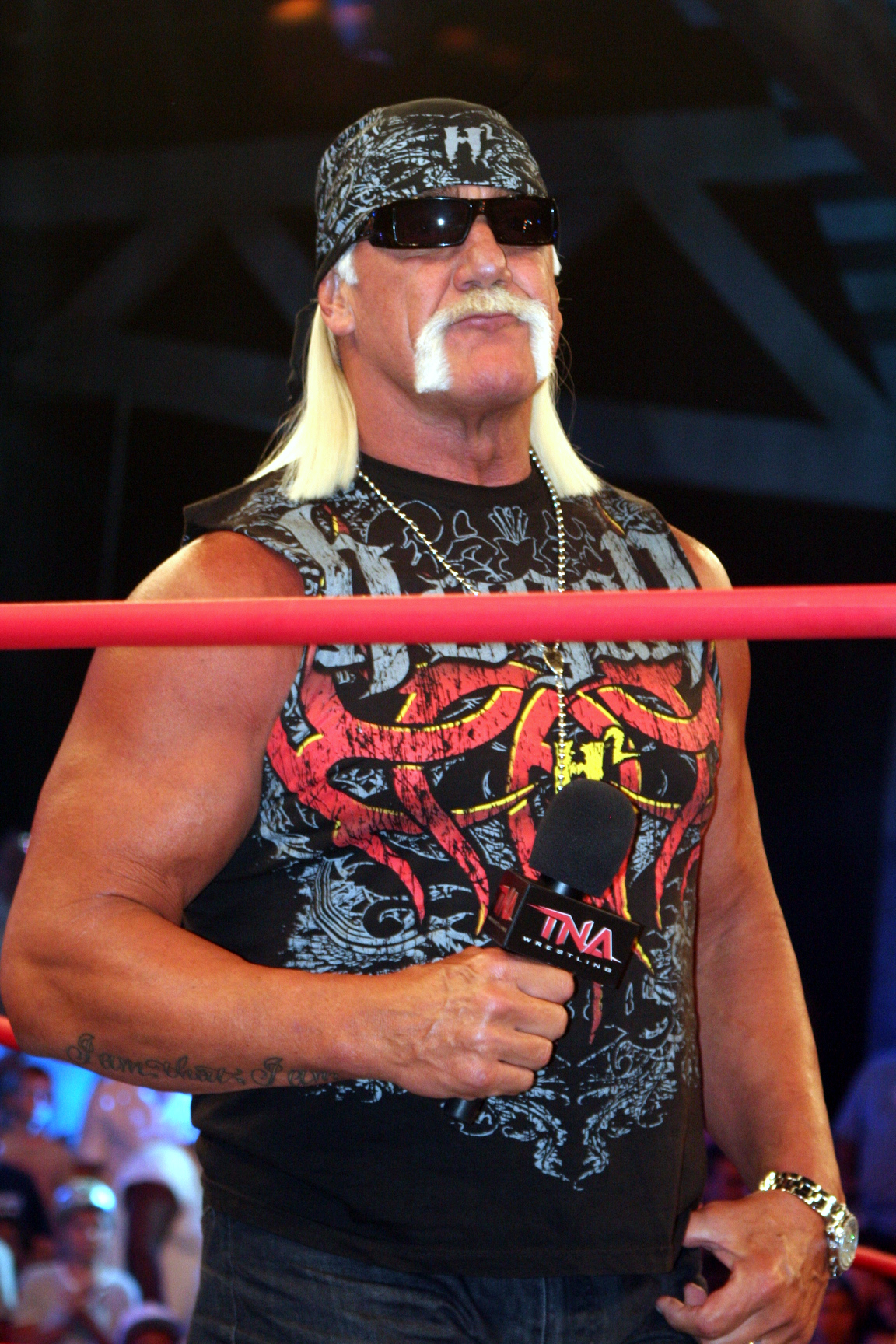
Hulk Hogan

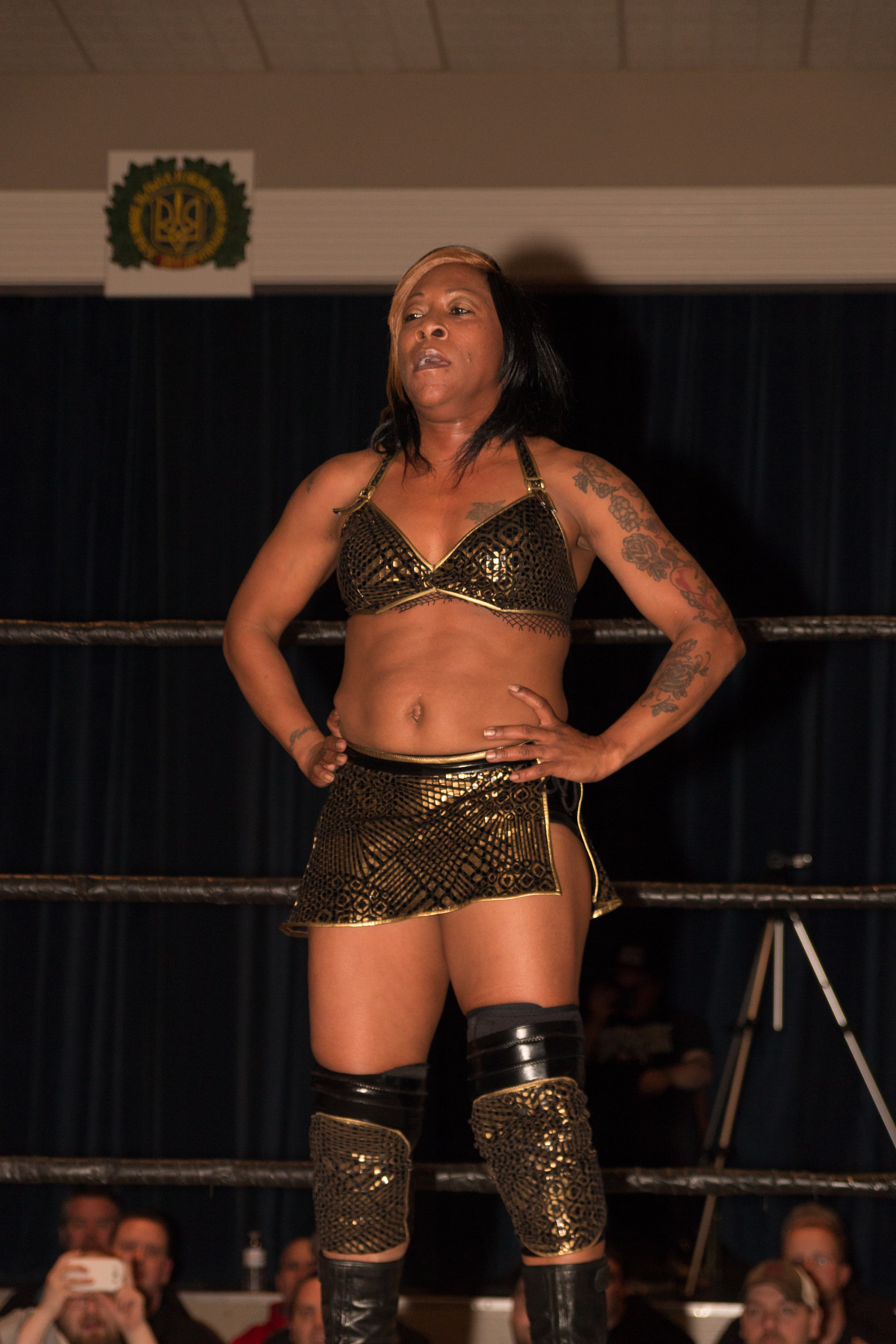
Jazz

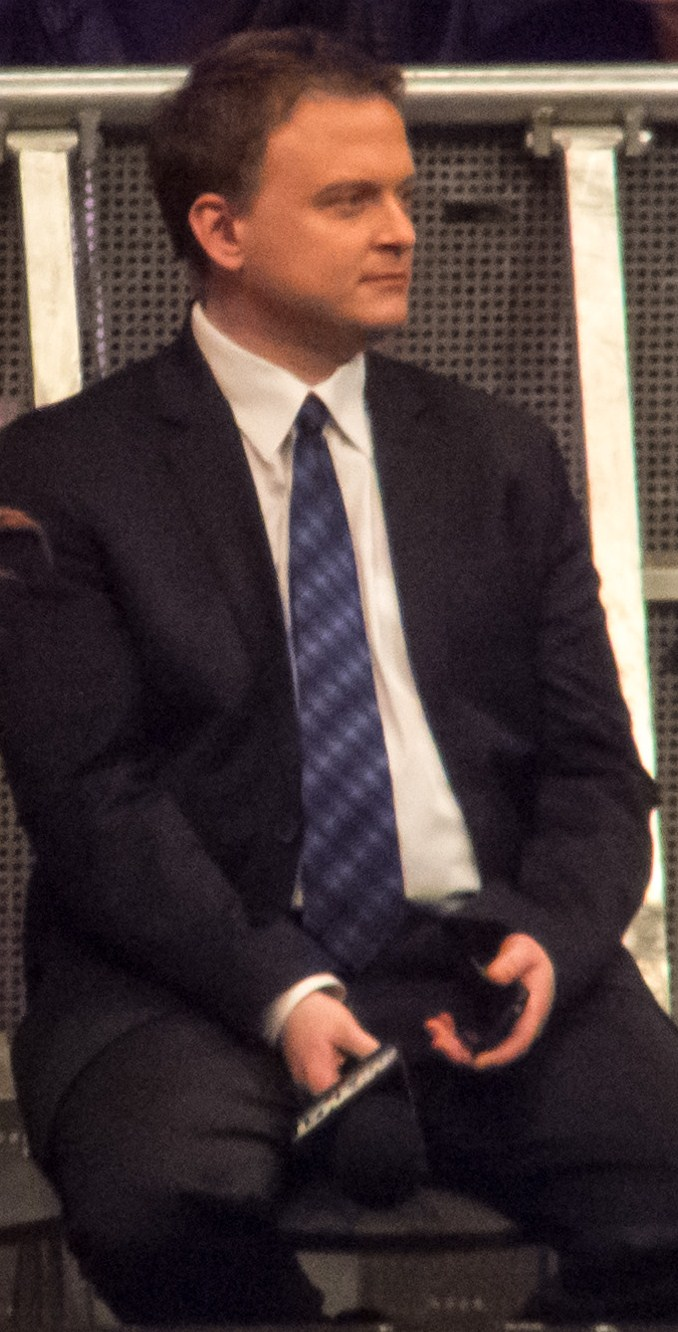
Jeremy Borash

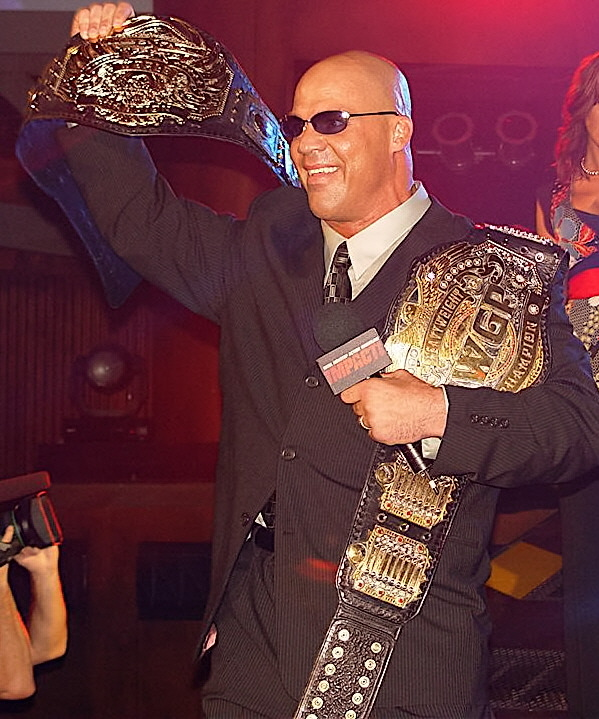
Kurt Angle

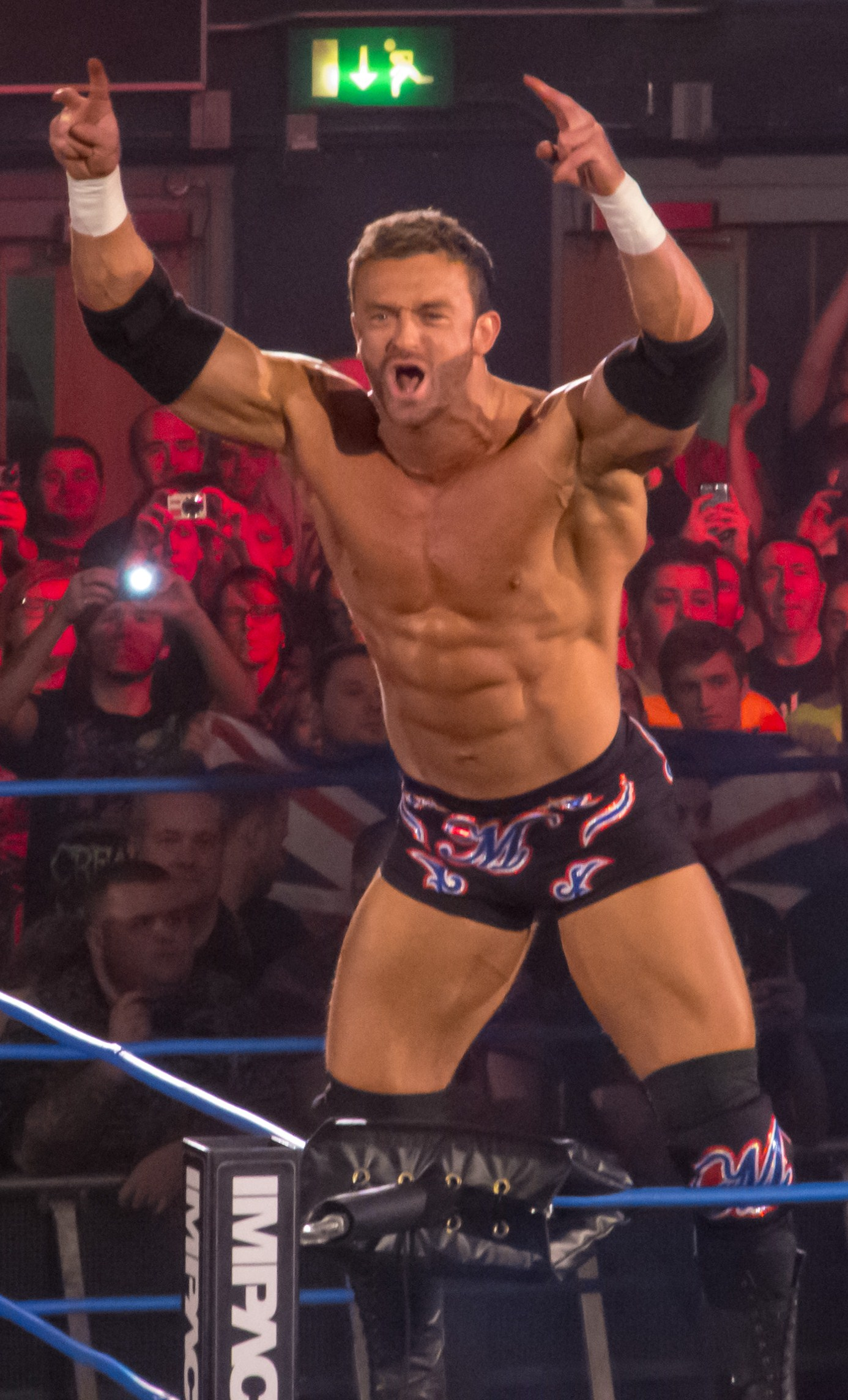
Magnus

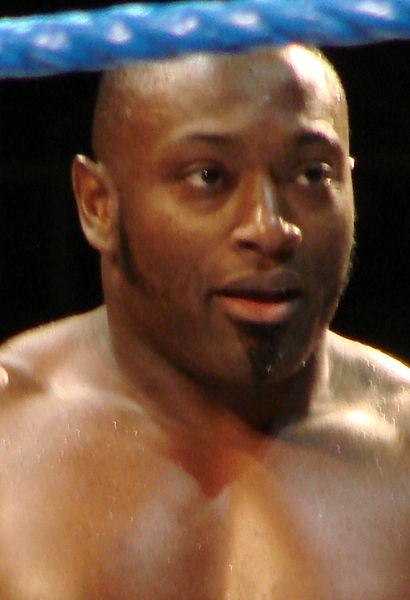
Monty Brown

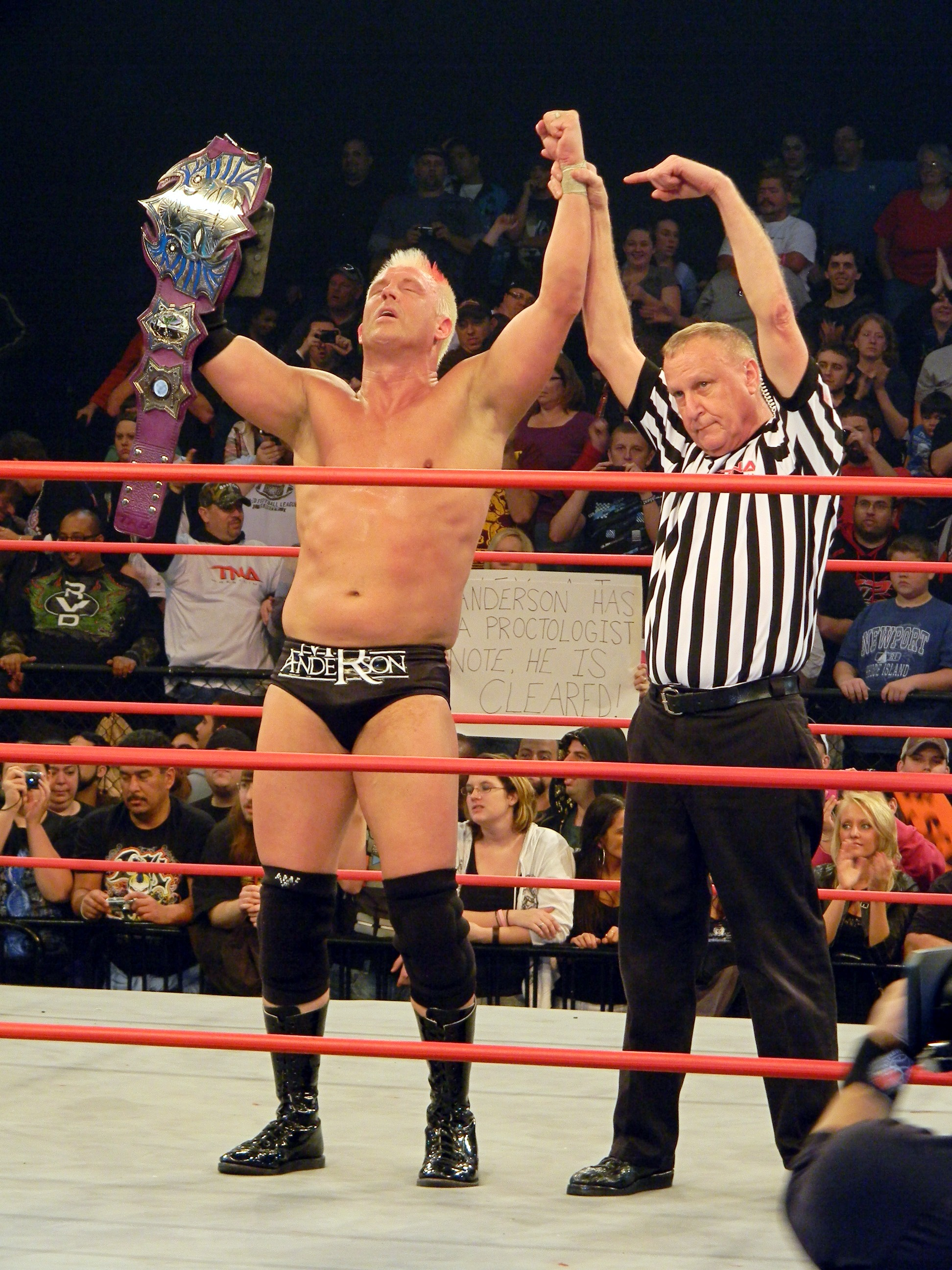
Mr. Anderson

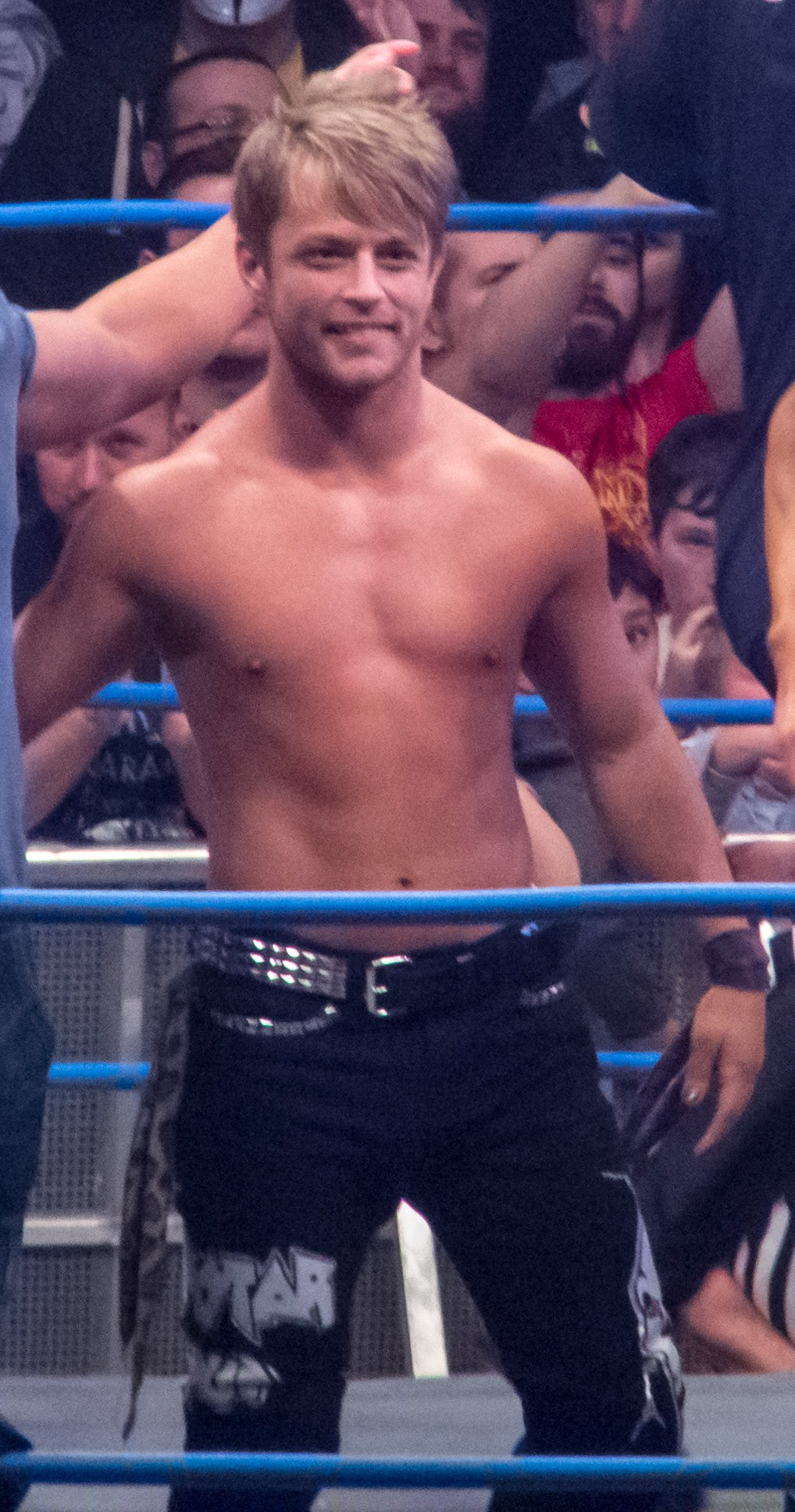
Rockstar Spud

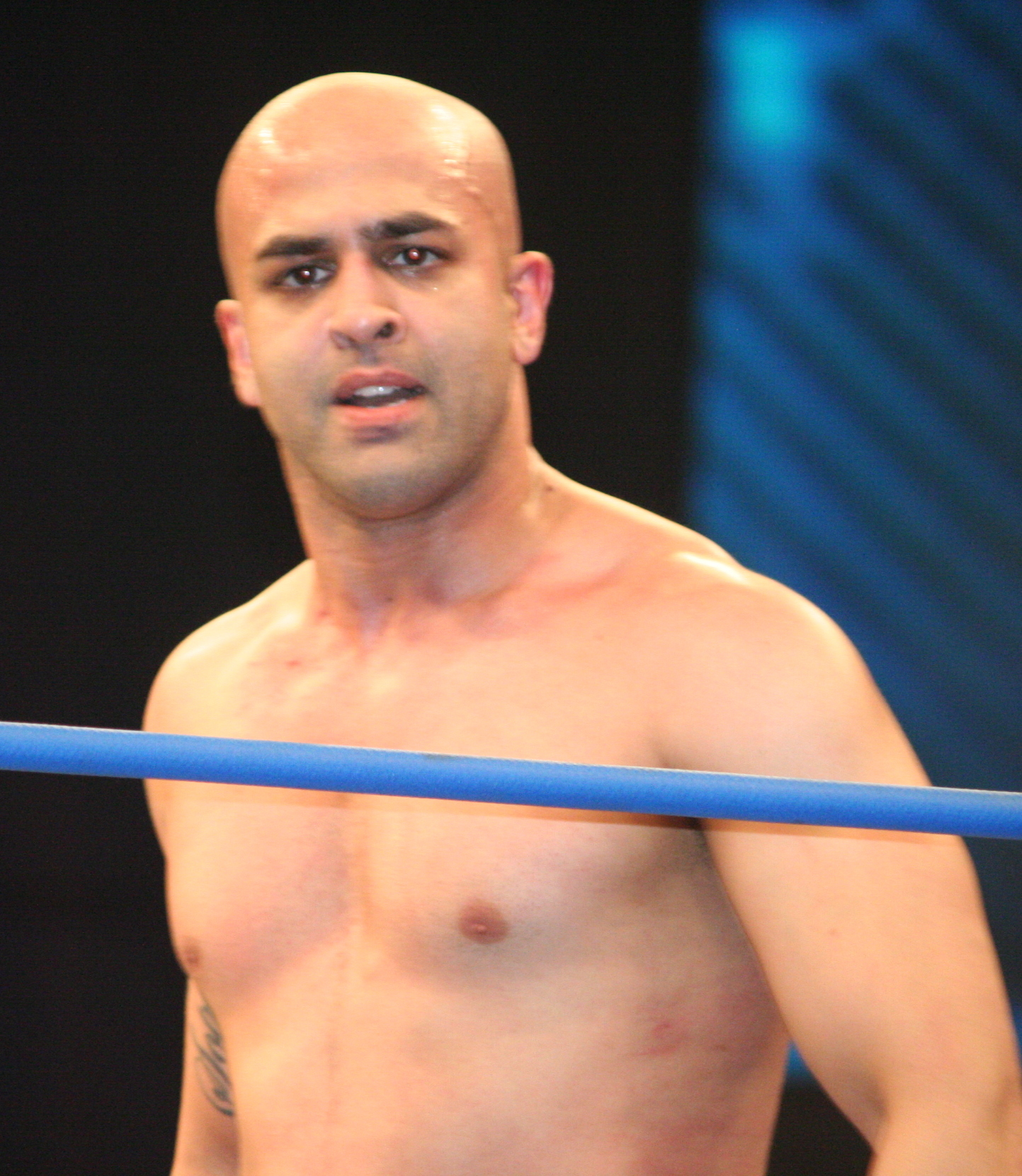
Sonjay Dutt

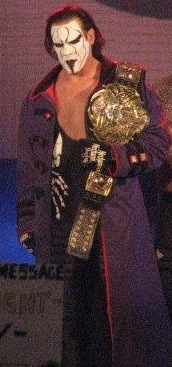
Sting

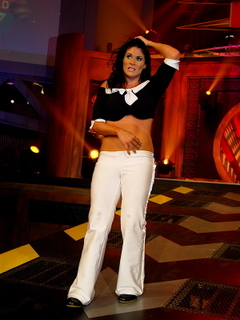
Traci Brooks

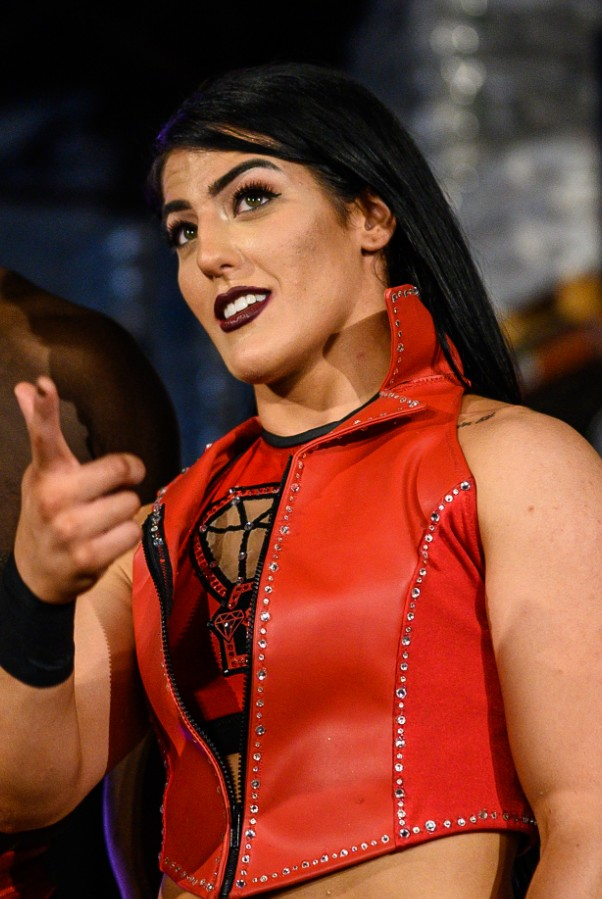
Tessa Blanchard

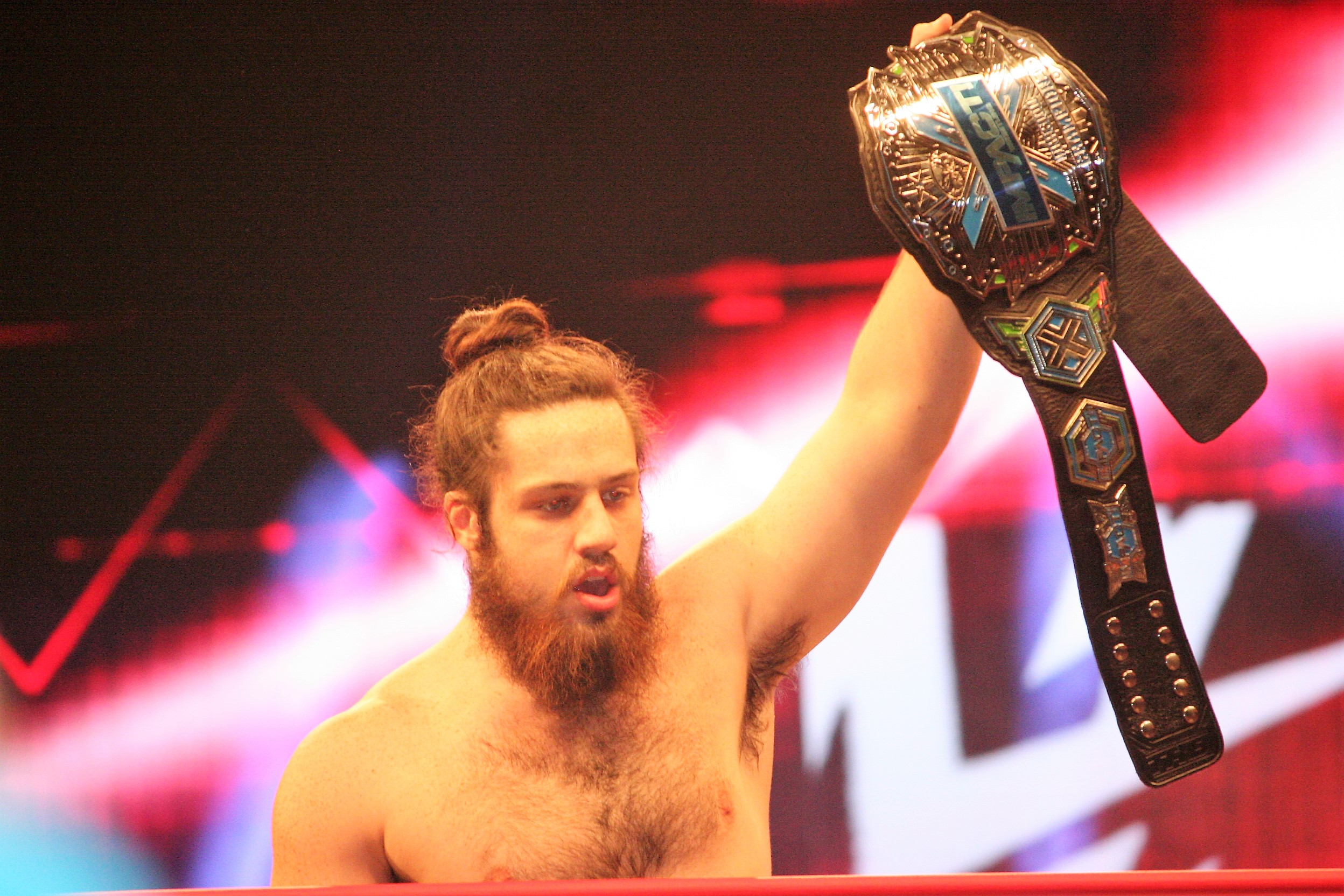
Trevor Lee

Birth name	Ring name (s)	Tenure	Ref
Unknown	Robert Adams	2006	
Unknown	Soul Assassin	2003	
Unknown	Azreal	2002	
Unknown	Black Taurus; Taurus	2019; 2021–2024	
Unknown	Ryan Boz	2004	
Unknown	Cameron	2010	
Donna Adamo	Elektra	2002	
Brian Adams †	Brian Adams	2004	
Jay Adams	Eddie Venom	2004	
Wes Adams	Alan Steele	2003	
Jonah Adelman	Jonah Adelman; Jonah	2003	
Lacey Adkisson	Lacey Von Erich	2009–2010	
Brent Albright	Vinnie Valentino	2003	
Nicholas Aldis	Magnus; Nick Aldis	2008–2015; 2017; 2023	
Michael Alfonso †	Mike Awesome	2003	
Chad Allegra	Chad 2 Badd; Karl Anderson	2020–2022	
Dean Allmark	Xtreme Dean Allmark	2004	
Luis Almodovar	Damian Adams	2003; 2004	
Michael Altieri	Mikey Batts	2004–2005	
Sara Amato	Sara Del Rey	2009; 2010	
Melissa Anderson	Alissa Flash; Cheerleader Melissa; Melissa Anderson; Raisha Saeed	2008–2010; 2011; 2013	
Kenneth Anderson	Ken Anderson; Mr. Anderson	2010–2016	
Schuyler Andrews	Mason Andrews	2012; 2013	
Kurt Angle	Kurt Angle	2006–2016	
Edward Annis	Teddy Hart	2003; 2004	
Joseph Applebaumer	Pogo the Clown	2003	
William Apter	Bill Apter	2004	
Jorge Arriaga Rodríguez	Incognito	2006	
Saúl Armendáriz	Satanico del Exotico; Andromeda	2009	
James Atkins	James Mason	2004	
Robert Backlund	Bob Backlund; Mr. Backlund	2007	
Marcus Bagwell	Buff Bagwell; Marcus Bagwell	2002–2003; 2006	
Ozgür Bakar	Murat Bosporus	2009; 2011	
James Ballard	Shannon Ballard	2002	
Michael Ballard	Shane Ballard	2002	
Matt Barela	Anarquia	2011–2012	
Charles Barsky	David Starr	2016	
Jeremy Barron	Dr. Heresy	2002	
Lyle Basham Jr.	Doug Basham; Basham	2007	
Leva Bates	Leva Bates	2008; 2011; 2012; 2016	
Douglas Becker	Adam Flash	2004	
Carlene Begnaud	Jazz	2020–2021	
Bill Behrens	Bill Behrens	2002–2004	
Jazmin Benitez	Mercedes Martinez	2021–2022	
Michael Bennett	Mike Bennett	2016–2017; 2022	
Matthew Bentley	Michael Shane; Matt Bentley; Martyr; Maverick Matt	2003–2007; 2011; 2013	
Robert Berzins	Robbie Dynamite	2004	
Retesh Bhalla	Sonjay Dutt	2003–2009; 2012–2013; 2017–2019	
Trenesha Biggers	Rhaka Khan	2008–2009	
Rocksan Biggerstaff †	BellaDonna	2002–2004	
Luther Biggs	Disgraceland	2003	
Adam Birch	Joey Matthews	2002; 2004; 2007	
Eric Bischoff	Eric Bischoff	2009–2014	
Garett Bischoff	Garett Bischoff; Jackson James	2010–2015	
Tessa Blanchard	Tessa Blanchard	2018–2020; 2024–2026	
Richard Blood	Ricky Steamboat	2002	
Michael Boehne†	Eric Priest	2003	
Jonathan Bolen	Jon Bolen	2005	
Brooke Bollea	Brooke Hogan	2012–2013	
Terry Bollea †	Hulk Hogan	2004; 2009–2013	
Dante Bonaduce	Danny Bonaduce	2009	
Larry Booker †	Moondog Spot	2003	
Jeremy Borash	Jeremy Borash	2002–2018	
Anthony Borcherding	2 Tuff Tony	2004; 2008	
Steve Borden	Sting	2003–2014	
Kim Borrego	Kim Couture	2009	
Jeremy Boyd	Slim J	2002	
Erin Bray	Erin Bray	2002	
Rebecca Briggs	Fluff Dupp; Seven Briggs	2002	
Wesley Brisco	Wes Brisco	2012–2014	
Phillip Brooks	CM Punk	2003–2004	
Tracy Brookshaw	Traci; Tracy; Traci Brooks; Tracy Brooks; Ms. Brooks	2003–2010; 2011–2012	
Montaque Brown	Monty Brown	2002; 2004–2006	
Wagner Brown	Wagner Brown; Slyk Wagner Brown	2002–2003; 2011	
Jason Broyles	E. Z. Money; Jason B.	2002–2003	
Joseph Bruce	Violent J	2003–2004; 2006; 2008	
Terrance Brunk †	Sabu	2002–2006; 2010	
Michael Bucci	Hollywood Nova	2010	
Alvin Burke Jr.	Antonio Bank$ MVP	2003; 2004; 2014–2015	
Elijah Burke	D'Angelo Dinero; Da Pope	2009–2013; 2015–2017	
Mason Burnett	Caleb Konley; Suicide; Kaleb Konley; Kaleb with a K	2016–2019; 2020–2022	
Jon Burton	Jon Burton	2020–2021	
Brian Button	Brian Cage	2013; 2014; 2018–2020	
Josette Bynum	Sojournor Bolt; Sojo Bolt; Josie Robinson	2008–2009; 2013	
Trevor Caddell	Trevor Lee	2015–2018	
Frank Caiazzo †	Frankie Capone; Francisco Ciatso	2003; 2004; 2007	
Bradley Cain	Lodi	2002	
Jason Calabrese	Jason Static	2010	
Kevin Canady	Mad Man Pondo	2003	
Christopher Candito †	Chris Candido	2005	
John Candito	Johnny Candido	2005	
Charles Cardwell	Naphtali Naphtali	2007	
Michael Cariglio	Michael Modest	2006	
Leonard Carlson	Lenny; Lenny Lane	2002	
Justin Carnes	Conrad Kennedy III	2004	
Stacy Carter	Stacy Carter	2010	
Dixie Carter	Dixie Carter	2003–2017	
Eric Casas Ruiz	Heavy Metal	2002–2003	
José Casas Ruiz	Negro Casas	2003	
Sean Casey	Sean Casey	2003	
David Cash	Kid Kash	2002–2005; 2010; 2011–2013	
Dionicio Castellanos	Psicosis; Psychosis	2002; 2003–2004	
Max Caster	Max Caster	2026	
Gabriela Castrovinci	Raquel	2016–2017	
Edward Chastain	Iceberg; Edward Chastain	2003	
Chris Chavis	Tatanka	2009	
Kory Chavis	Rainman; Kory Chavis	2002; 2008	
Masahiro Chono	Masahiro Chono	2003	
Mike Christeas	Python	2003	
Peter Clark	Bobby Jo Marshall	2006	
Vincent Clark	Jerrelle Clark	2004–2006	
Todd Clem	Bubba the Love Sponge	2010	
Leticia Cline	Leticia Cline	2006–2007	
David Clutter	Kimo	2010	
Craig Cohn	Craig Classic	2005–2006	
Michael Cole	Mikael Judas; Murphy	2004; 2008; 2010–2011	
Caprice Coleman	Caprice Coleman	2003	
Anthony Cicione	Anthony Cicione	2024–2025	
Rachel Collins	MsChif	2003	
Chad Collyer	Chad Collyer	2003–2004	
Scott Colton	Colt Cabana	2003; 2009	
Clifford Compton	Cliff Compton	2003; 2012	
Accie Connor	D'Lo Brown	2003–2004; 2009–2013; 2019–2022	
Taeler Conrad	Taeler Hendrix	2012–2013	
Jose Cordero	Lince Dorado	2012; 2013; 2023	
Billy Corgan	Billy Corgan	2016	
Steven Corino	Steve Corino	2002–2003	
James Cornette	Jim Cornette	2006–2009; 2017	
Gilbert Corsey	Gilbert Corsey	2013	
Gilbert Cosme	Judas Mesias	2007–2008; 2013	
Toby Keith Covel †	Toby Keith	2002	
Daniel Covell	Christopher Daniels; Chris Daniels; Daniels; Curry Man; Suicide	2002–2010; 2011–2014; 2021	
Christina Crawford	Christina Crawford	2012	
Victoria Crawford	Victoria Elizabeth Crawford	2025–2026	
Jessica Cricks	Havok; Jessicka	2014–2015; 2019–2024	
David Crist Jr.	Dave Crist	2017–2020	
John Crist	Jake Crist; Jacob Crist	2017–2020; 2021; 2023	
Jason Cross	Adam Jacobs	2002; 2003	
James Cruikshanks	J. C. Ice	2003	
Jonathan Cruz	Ben Dejo; José Lopez	2010; 2011; 2012	
James Curtin	Rockstar Spud; Spud	2012–2017	
Nicholas Cvjetkovich	Sinn	2003–2004; 2005; 2010; 2013	

Company name to Year
NWA: Total Nonstop Action	2002–2004
Total Nonstop Action Wrestling	2004–2017, 2024–present
Global Force Wrestling	June–September 2017
Impact Wrestling	March–June 2017, September 2017–January 2024
Notes
† Indicates they are deceased

== See also ==
- List of Total Nonstop Action Wrestling personnel
