= List of Total Nonstop Action Wrestling personnel =

Personnel of the American wrestling promotion Total Nonstop Action Wrestling

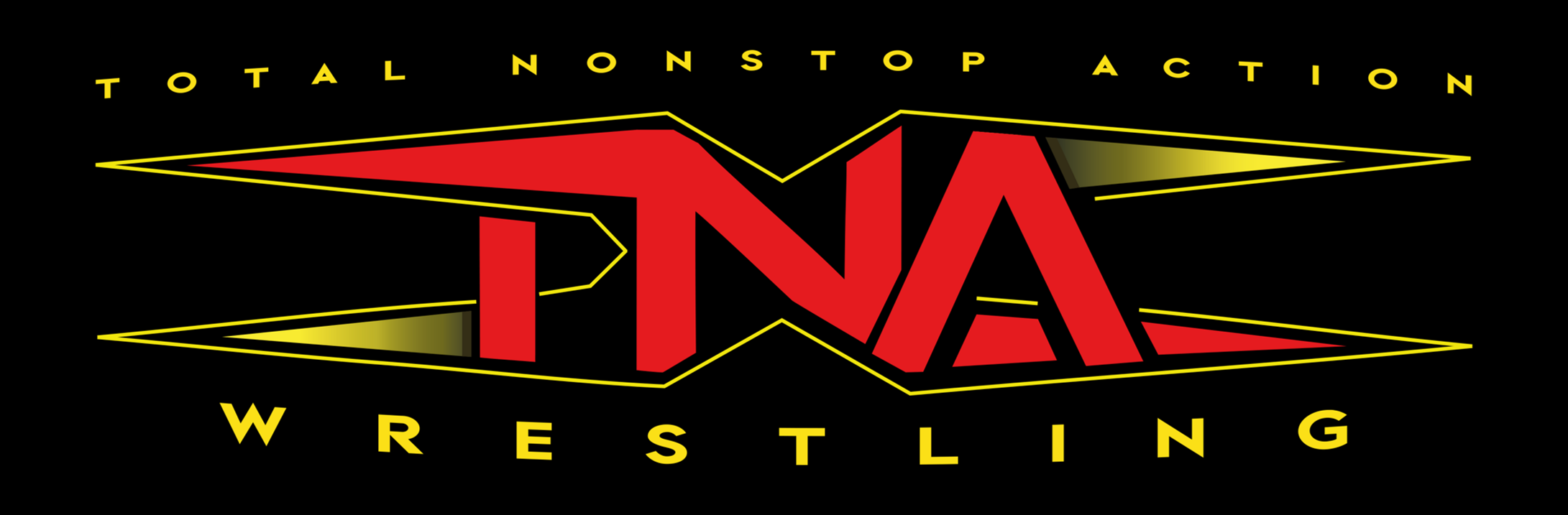

Total Nonstop Action Wrestling (TNA) – is a professional wrestling promotion based in Nashville, Tennessee as a subsidiary of Anthem Sports & Entertainment.

TNA personnel consists of professional wrestlers, managers, play-by-play and color commentators, ring announcers, interviewers, referees, trainers, producers, script writers, and various other positions. Executives are listed as well.

Active wrestlers and on-screen talent appear on TNA's flagship weekly show Impact, pay-per-views and at untelevised live events. Personnel are organized below by their role, with their ring name on the left, and their real name on the right. TNA refers to its female performers as "Knockouts".

TNA has partnerships with various national promotions, such as WWE (in particular the NXT brand), as well as independent promotions, such as Ohio Valley Wrestling (OVW), and AAW Wrestling.

As such, wrestlers from these companies may also make periodic appearances on TNA programming, and TNA recognizes when one of their wrestlers holds a championship from a partner promotion.

== Roster ==
=== Men's division ===
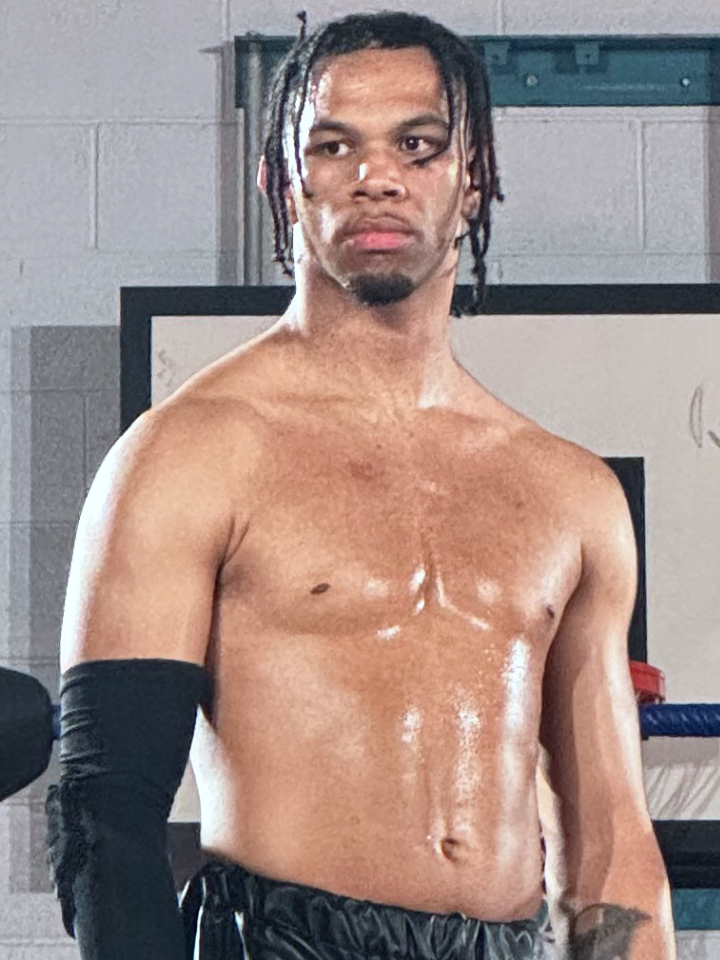
Leon Slater

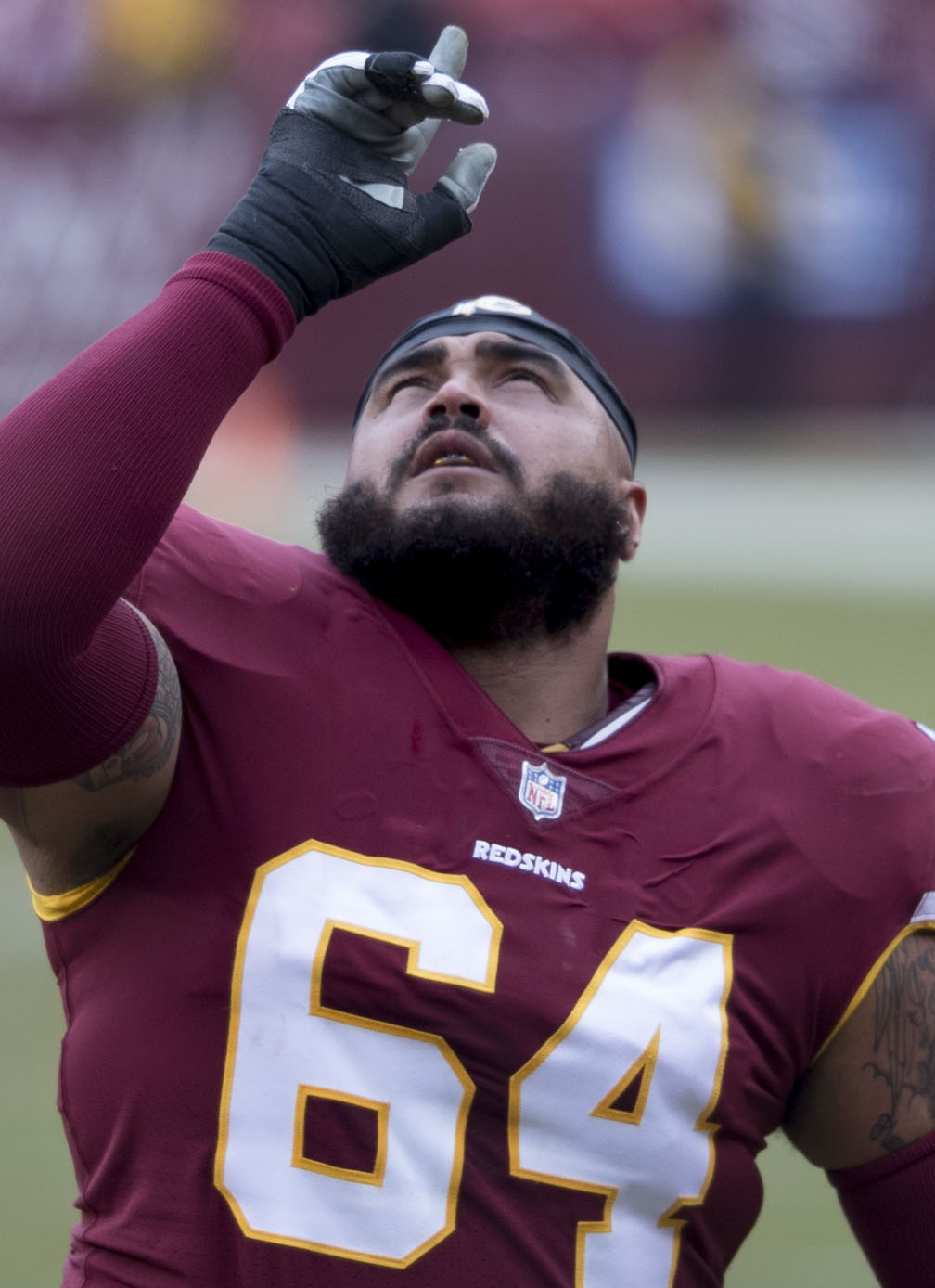
A. J. Francis

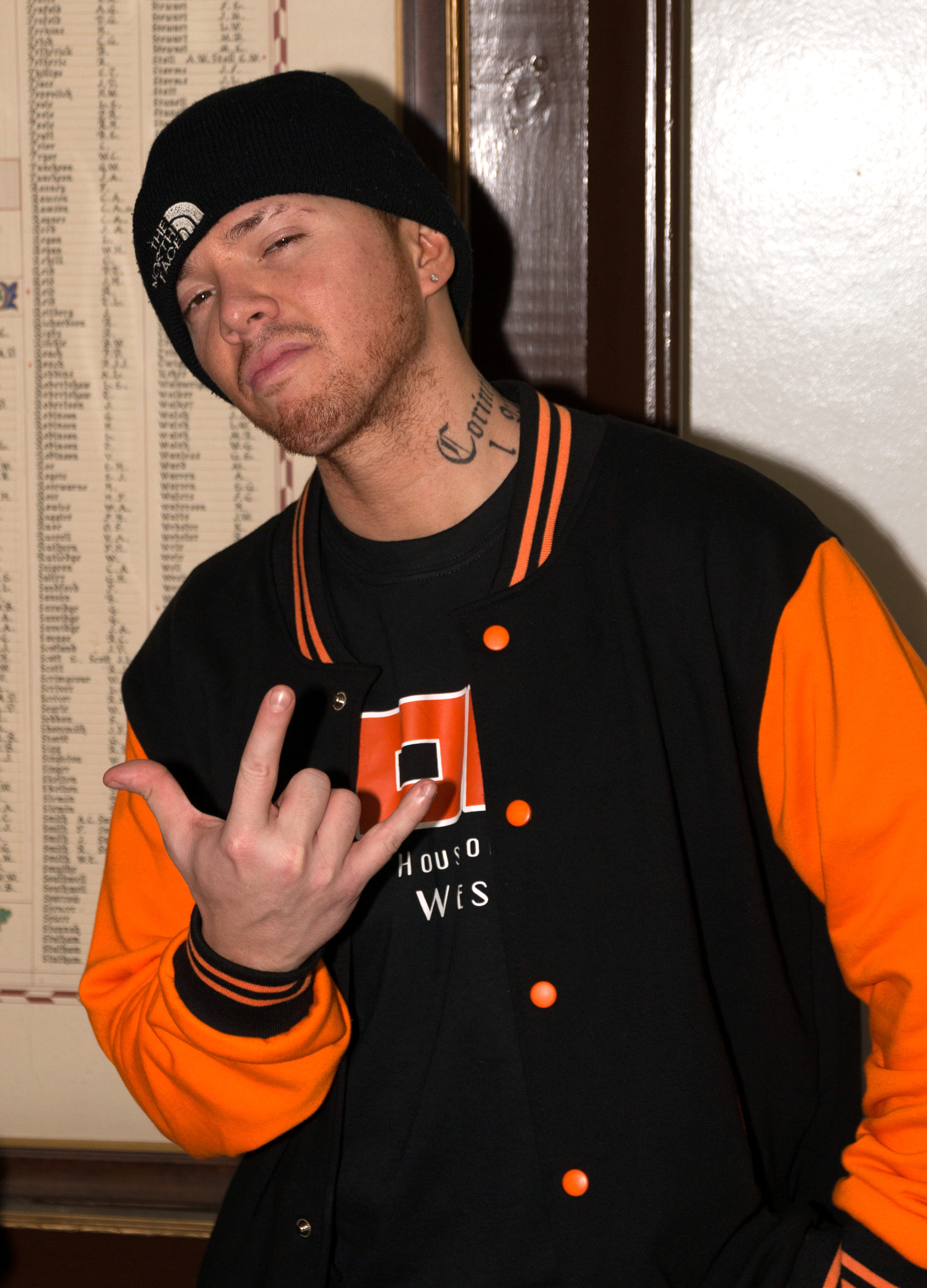
Amazing Red

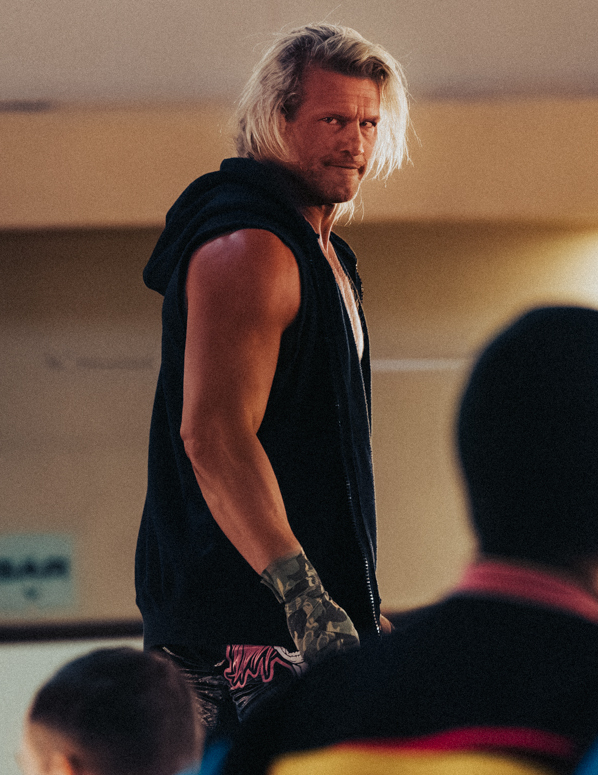
Nic Nemeth

Ring name	Real name	Notes
AJ Francis	Anthony Francis	International Champion
Amazing Red	Jonathan Figueroa	X Division Champion; Hall of Famer
Avery Styles	Avery Jones	
BDE	Brandon Collymore	
Bear Bronson	Joseph Fitzpatrick	
Brian Myers	Brian Myers	
Cedric Alexander	Cedric Johnson	
Dutch	William Carr	
Eddie Edwards	Eric Maher	
Elijah	Jeffrey Sciullo	
Erick Redbeard	Joseph Rudd	
Fabian Aichner	Fabian Aichner	
Frankie Kazarian	Frank Gerdelman	
Jason Hotch	Eric Hotchkiss	
Jeff Hardy	Jeffrey Hardy	
Joe Alonzo	Joseph Alonzo	AAW Heavyweight Champion
John Skyler	Jonathan Brumbaugh	
Joseph Sawyer	Joseph Ruby	
KC Navarro	Christian Navarro	
Leon Slater	Leon Slater	World Champion
Matt Hardy	Matthew Hardy	
Moose	Quinn Ojinnaka	
Mr. Elegance	Andreas Ziegler	
Mustafa Ali	Adeel Alam	
Nic Nemeth	Nicholas Nemeth	World Tag Team Champion
Rich Swann	Richard Swann	
Ricky Sosa	Noël Allaly	
Ryan Nemeth	Ryan Nemeth	World Tag Team Champion
Samuel Shaw	Samuel Shaw	
The Hometown Man	Christopher Gray	
Trey Miguel	Trey McBrayer	
Vincent	Vincent Marseglia	
Zer0	William Collier	

=== Women's division (Knockouts) ===
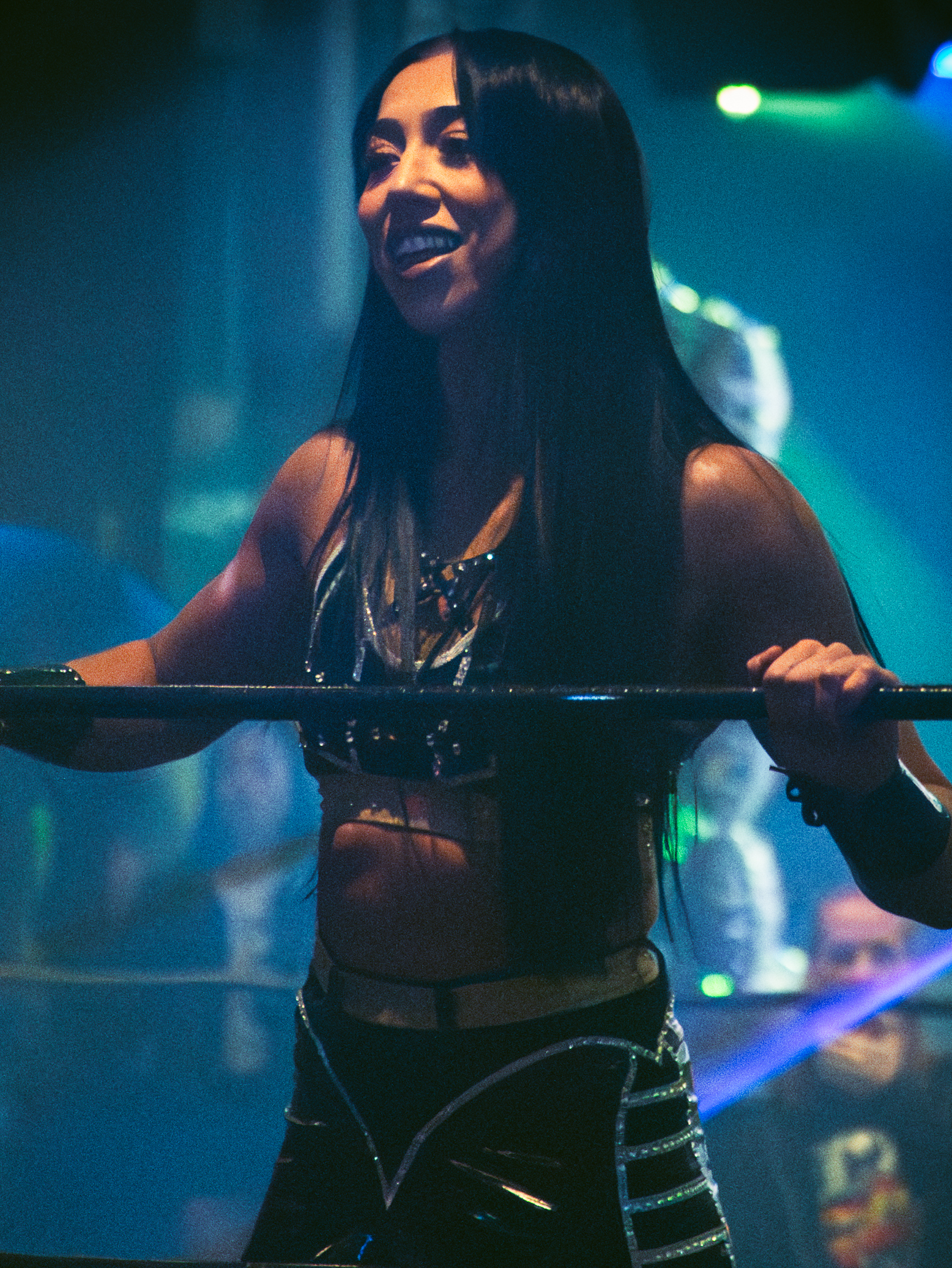
Indi Hartwell

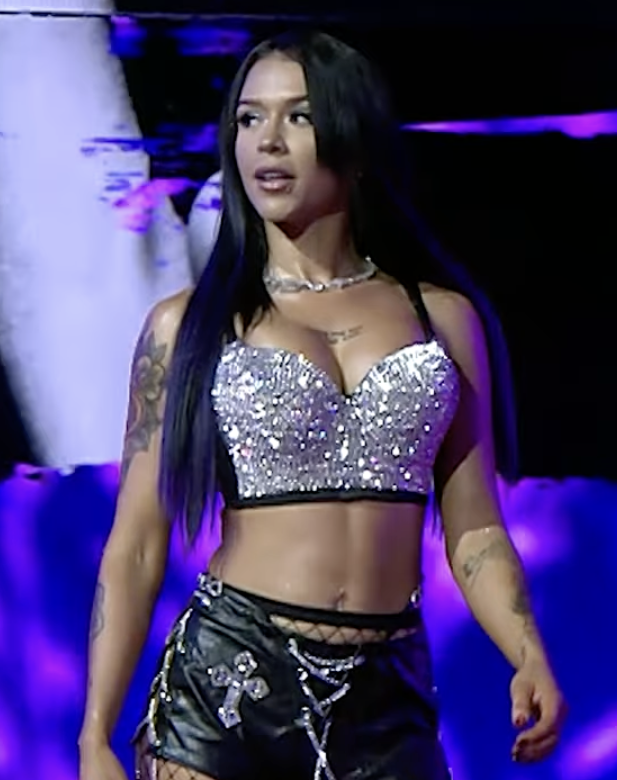
Elayna Black

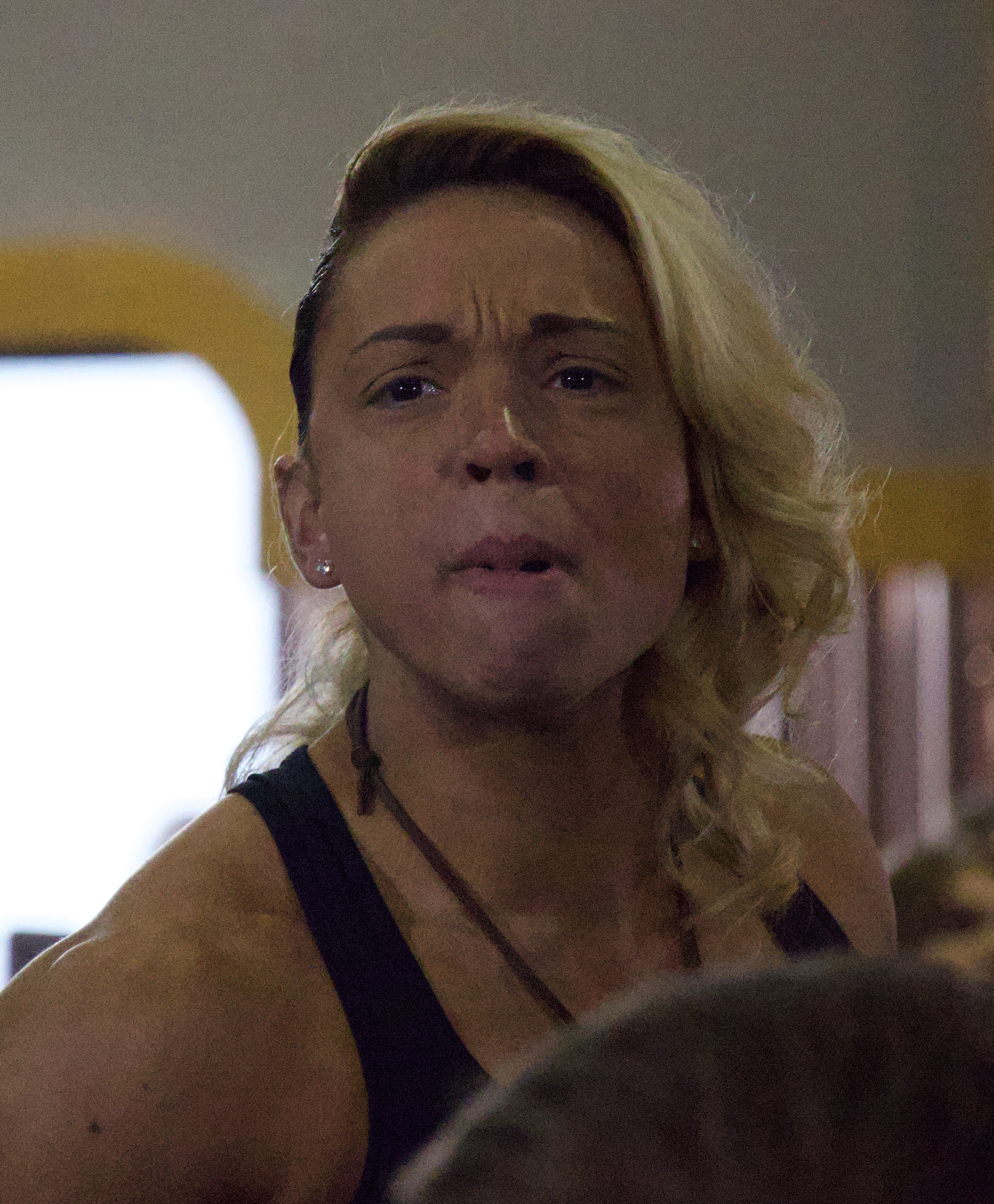
Zoey Serrano

Shayna Baszler

Ring name	Real name	Notes
Alisha Edwards	Alisha Maher	Marketing Coordinator
Allie	Laura Dennis	
Elayna Black	Brianna Coda	Knockouts Television Champion
Gabby Forza	Undisclosed	
Harley Hudson	Lilli Pruden	
Heather by Elegance	Jaime Chambers	
Indi Hartwell	Samantha De Martin	Knockouts World Champion
Jada Stone	Savannah Foxworth	
Kiera Hogan	Kiera Hogan	
M by Elegance	Maggie Peters	
Mila Moore	Kellie Morga	
Shayna Baszler	Shayna Baszler	Knockouts World Tag Team Champion
Shotzi Blackheart	Ashley Alfaro	
Taryn Terrell	Taryn Dryden	
Tasha Steelz	Latasha Harris	
Xia	Xia-Louise Brooks	
Zoey Serrano	Theresa Serrano	Knockouts World Tag Team Champion

=== Other on-air personnel ===
Ring name	Real name	Notes
Daria Rae	Daria Berenato	Director of Operations
Santino Marella	Anthony Carelli	Director of Authority; Producer

== PUP list ==
TNA has established a PUP (physically unable to perform) list for wrestlers who are currently out with a legitimate injury, and thus not able to wrestle.

Ring name	Real name	Reason	Notes
Ash by Elegance	Ashley Sebera	Maternity leave	
Chris Bey	Daquan Johnson-Bey	Neck surgery	
KiLynn King	Unknown	Knee surgery	
Rosemary	Holly Letkeman	Torn ACL	Working as a producer during her injury recovery

== Referees ==
Ring name	Real name	Notes
Daniel Spencer	Daniel Spencer	
Frank Gastineau	Frank Gastineau	
Paige Prinzivalli	Paige Prinzivalli	

== Broadcast team ==
Ring name	Real name	Notes
Gia Miller	Georgia Milton	Backstage interviewer Occasional wrestler
Matthew Rehwoldt	Matthew Rehwoldt	Color commentator
McKenzie Mitchell	McKenzie Mitchell	Ring announcer Occasional backstage interviewer
Tom Hannifan	Thomas Hannifan	Play-by-play commentator

== Producers ==
Ring name	Real name	Notes
Ace Steel	Christopher Guy	
John E. Bravo	John Mellnick	Talent Relations
Candice Michelle	Candice Beckman	
Ingrid Isley	Ingrid Isley	Event Floor Manager; Talent Relations
JDC	Curtis Hussey	
Jorge Barbosa	Jorge Barbosa	Senior Producer
Mark Brown	Mark Brown	Productions Director
Lance Storm	Lance Evers	
Will Ferrara	William Ferrera	

== Executives ==
Ring name	Real name	Notes
Carlos Silva	Carlos Silva	President – TNA
David Clevinger	David Clevinger	Senior VP of Digital – Anthem Sports Group
Delirious	Hunter Johnston	Executive Producer and Head of Creative – TNA
Eric Thompkins	Eric Thompkins	VP of TV Production and Co-Head of Creative – TNA
George Veras	George Veras	Executive Producer – Anthem Sports Group
Leonard Asper	Leonard Asper	Founder/President/CEO – Anthem Sports & Entertainment
Nicole Rachine	Nicole Rachine	Senior VP of Sales – TNA
Ross Forman	Ross Forman	VP of Communications & Public Relations – TNA

== See also ==
- List of current champions in Total Nonstop Action Wrestling
- List of former Total Nonstop Action Wrestling personnel
- List of professional wrestling rosters
