= List of Total Nonstop Action Wrestling programming =

Total Nonstop Action Wrestling (TNA) is a professional wrestling promotion owned by Anthem Sports & Entertainment, based in Toronto, Canada. The promotion's flagship show is TNA Impact! which features all of the talent and major information regarding the promotion. TNA Xplosion is the promotion's secondary series.

The promotion also produces four pay-per-view events every year, and TNA+ Monthly Specials for their TNA+ online streaming service.

== Television programming ==
Country	Name	Channel	Ref
Argentina, Bolivia, Chile, Colombia, Costa Rica, Dominican Republic, Ecuador, El Salvador, Guatemala, Honduras, Mexico, Nicaragua, Panama, Paraguay, Peru, Uruguay, and Venezuela	TNA Impact! TNA+ Monthly specials Pay-Per-Views	Claro Sports	
Afghanistan, Bangladesh, Bhutan, India, Maldives, Nepal, Pakistan, and Sri Lanka	TNA Impact! TNA Xplosion Pehlwani Patakha TNA+ Monthly specials	Eurosport India	
Bosnia and Herzegovina, Bulgaria, Montenegro,Portugal, Serbia and Turkey	TNA Impact! TNA Xplosion TNA in 60	Fight Network	
Canada	TNA Impact! TNA Xplosion TNA in 60	Sportsnet 360	
United States	TNA Impact!	AMC	

== Former programming ==
Year(s)	Program	Notes
2003	TNA Genesis	DirecTV highlights special
2006	TNA Global Impact!	Internet series
2006–2007	TNA International	Archived 2002–2004 PPVs, also broadcast as "TNA Wrestling Collection" on ESPN Classic in Canada.
2007–2012	TNA Today	Internet series
2009–2010	TNA Epics	
2010	TNA Reaction	
2011–2015	TNA Greatest Matches	
2011–2013	Classic Impact	Archived TNA Impact! episodes
2012–2015	TNA Unfinished Business	
2012	Ring Ka King	Owned by Endemol India
2012	TNA British Boot Camp	
2013	TNA Backstage Pass	Owned by Challenge UK
2014	Countdown to the TNA UK Tour	Owned by Challenge UK
2015	Impact Wrestling: Unlocked	
2015–2016	TNA Legends	
2015–2016	Inside Impact	
2017–2018	After IMPACT!	
2021–2023	Before the Impact	

== See also ==
- List of TNA pay-per-view and livestreaming events
- List of professional wrestling television series
