= List of former Total Nonstop Action Wrestling personnel (I–M) =

Total Nonstop Action Wrestling is a professional wrestling company based in Nashville, Tennessee. Former employees (family name letters I–M) in TNA consist of professional wrestlers, managers, play-by-play and color commentators, announcers, interviewers, referees, trainers, script writers, executives, and board of directors. In the case of wrestlers originating from Spanish-speaking countries, who most often have two surnames, the paternal (first) surname is used.

TNA talent contracts range from developmental contracts to multi-year deals. They primarily appeared on TNA television programming, pay-per-views, monthly specials, and live events, and talent with developmental contracts appeared at Border City Wrestling and Ohio Valley Wrestling. When talent is released of their contract, it could be for a budget cut, the individual asking for their release, for personal reasons, time off from an injury, or retirement.

Those who made appearances without a contract and those who were previously released but are currently employed by TNA are not included.

== Alumni (I–M) ==
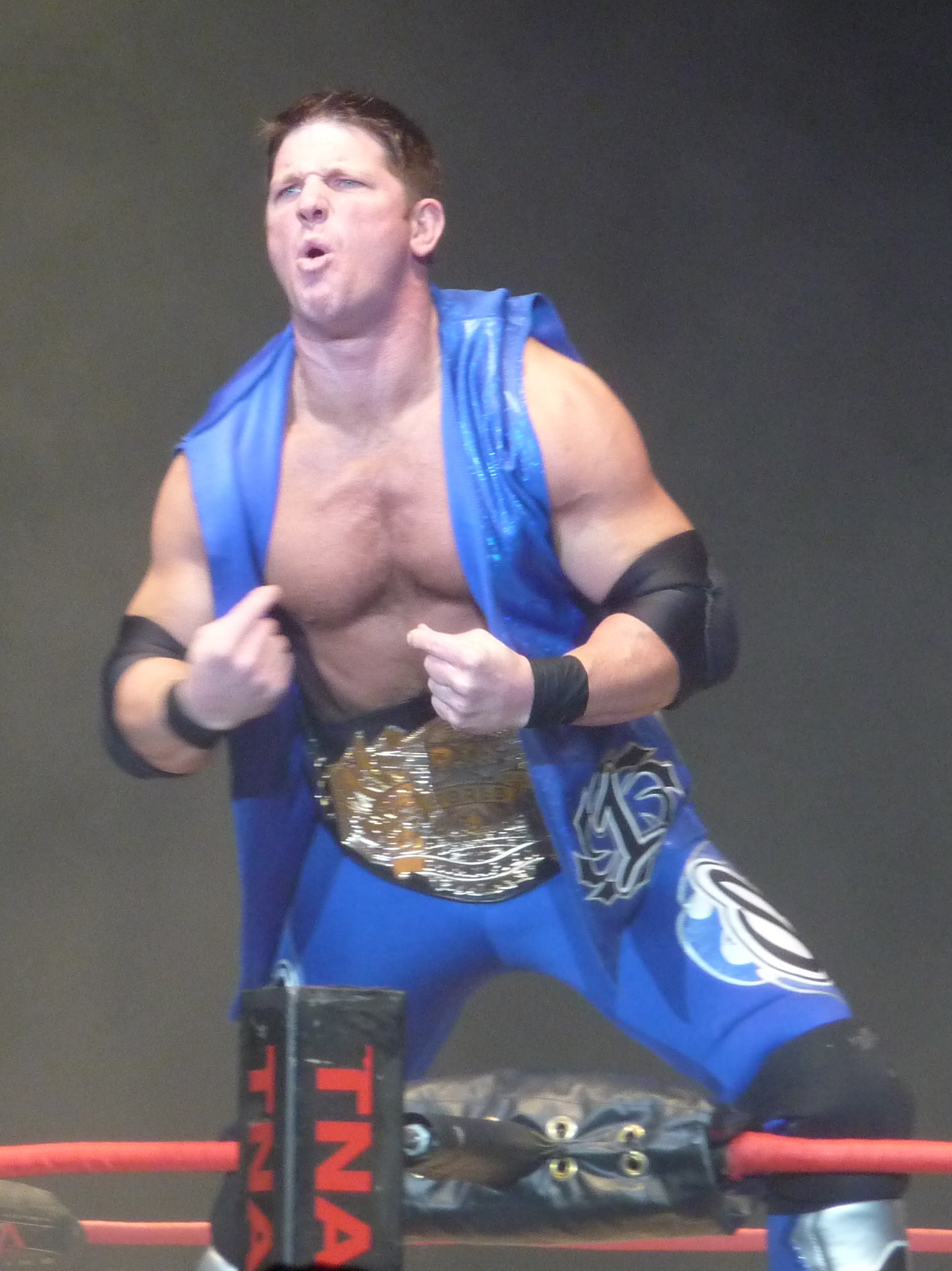
A.J. Styles

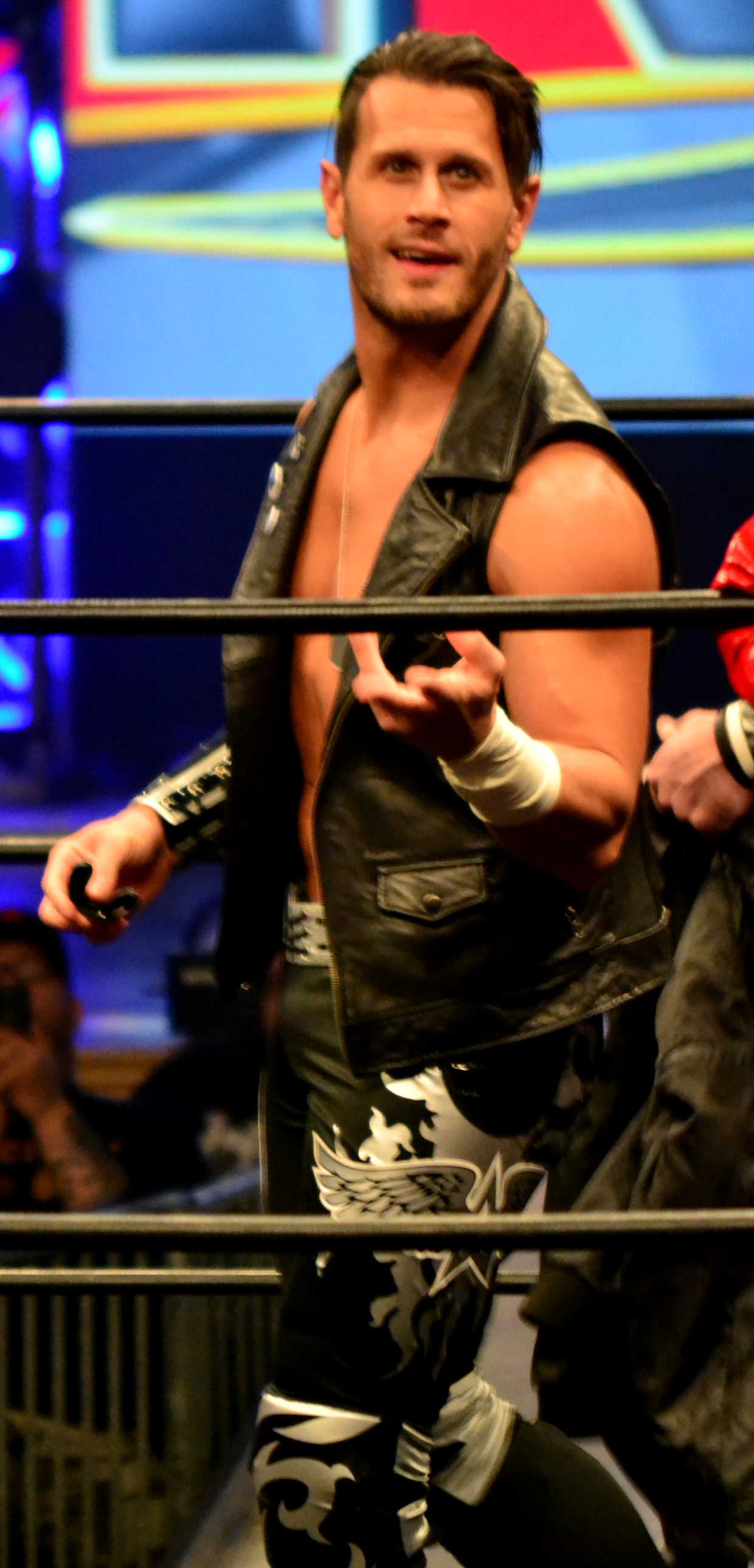
Alex Shelley

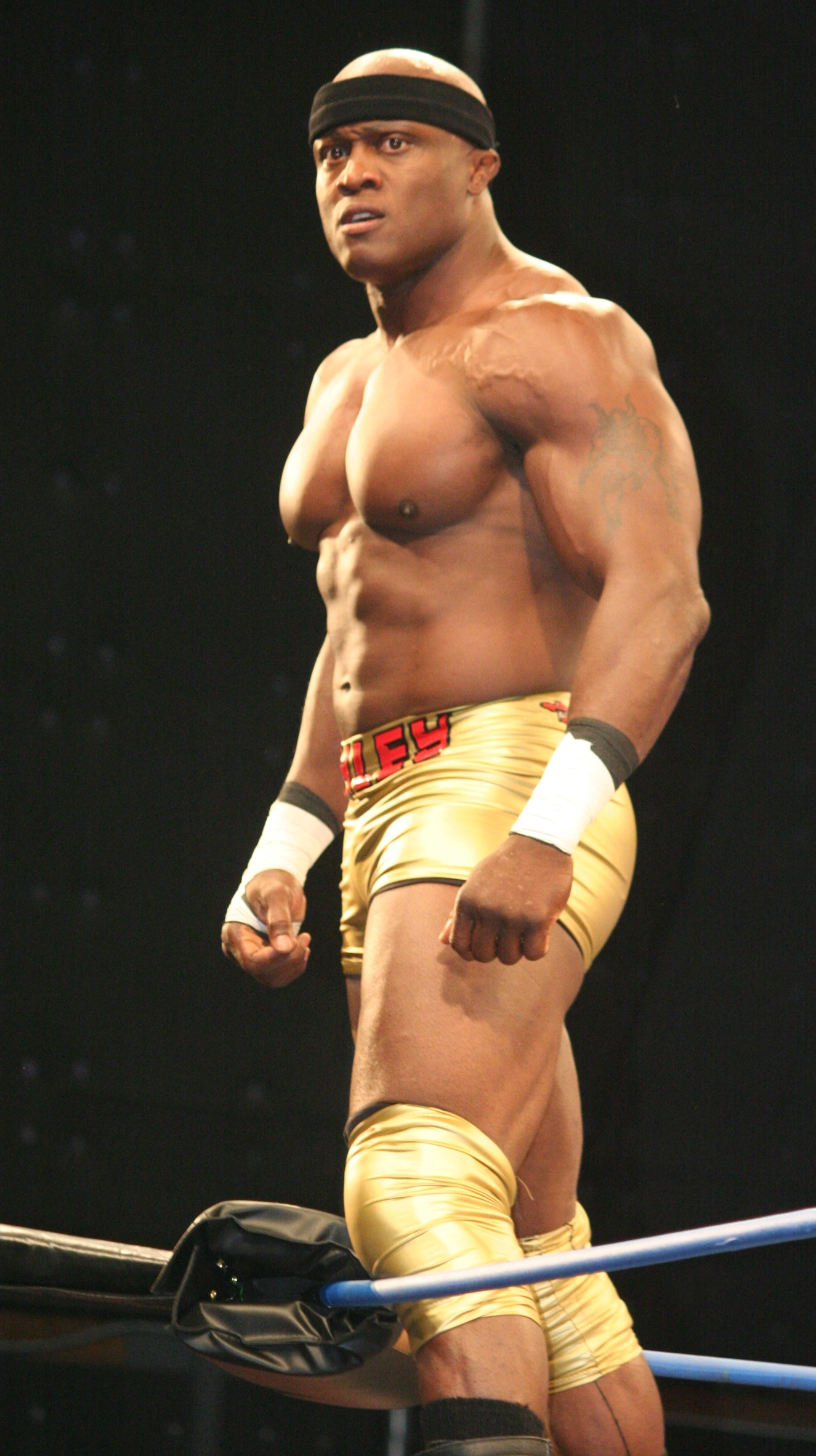
Bobby Lashley

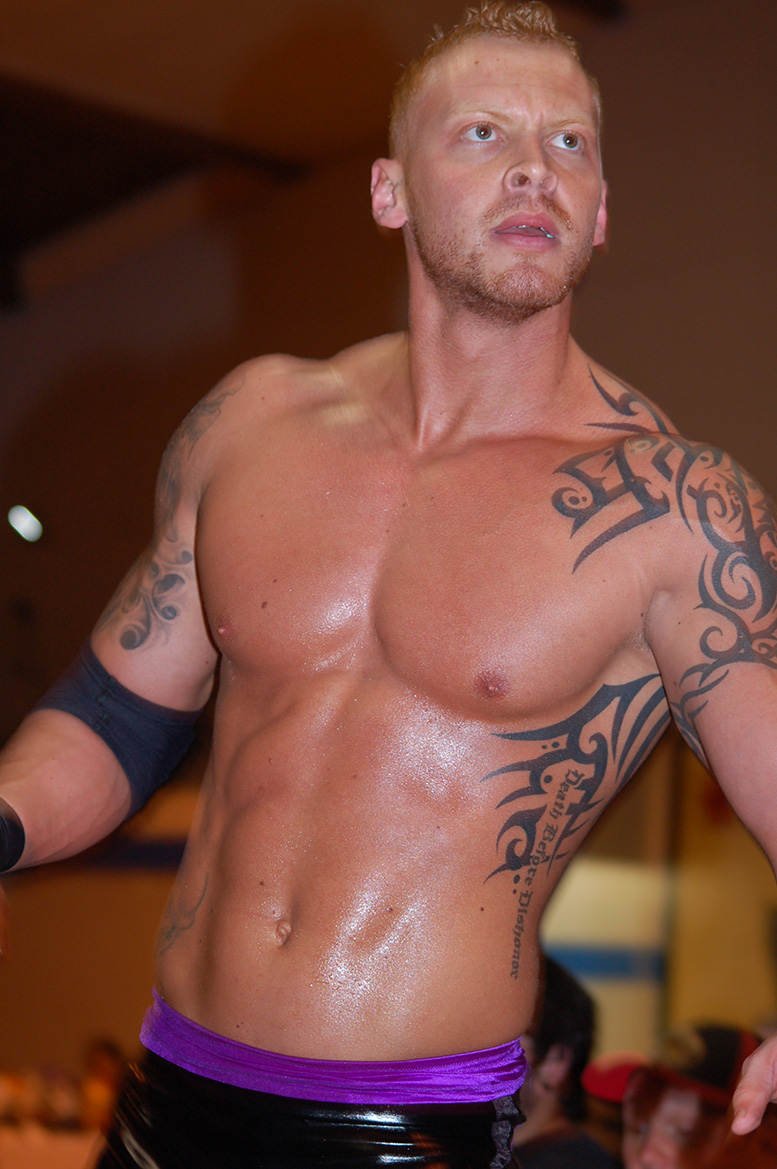
Crimson

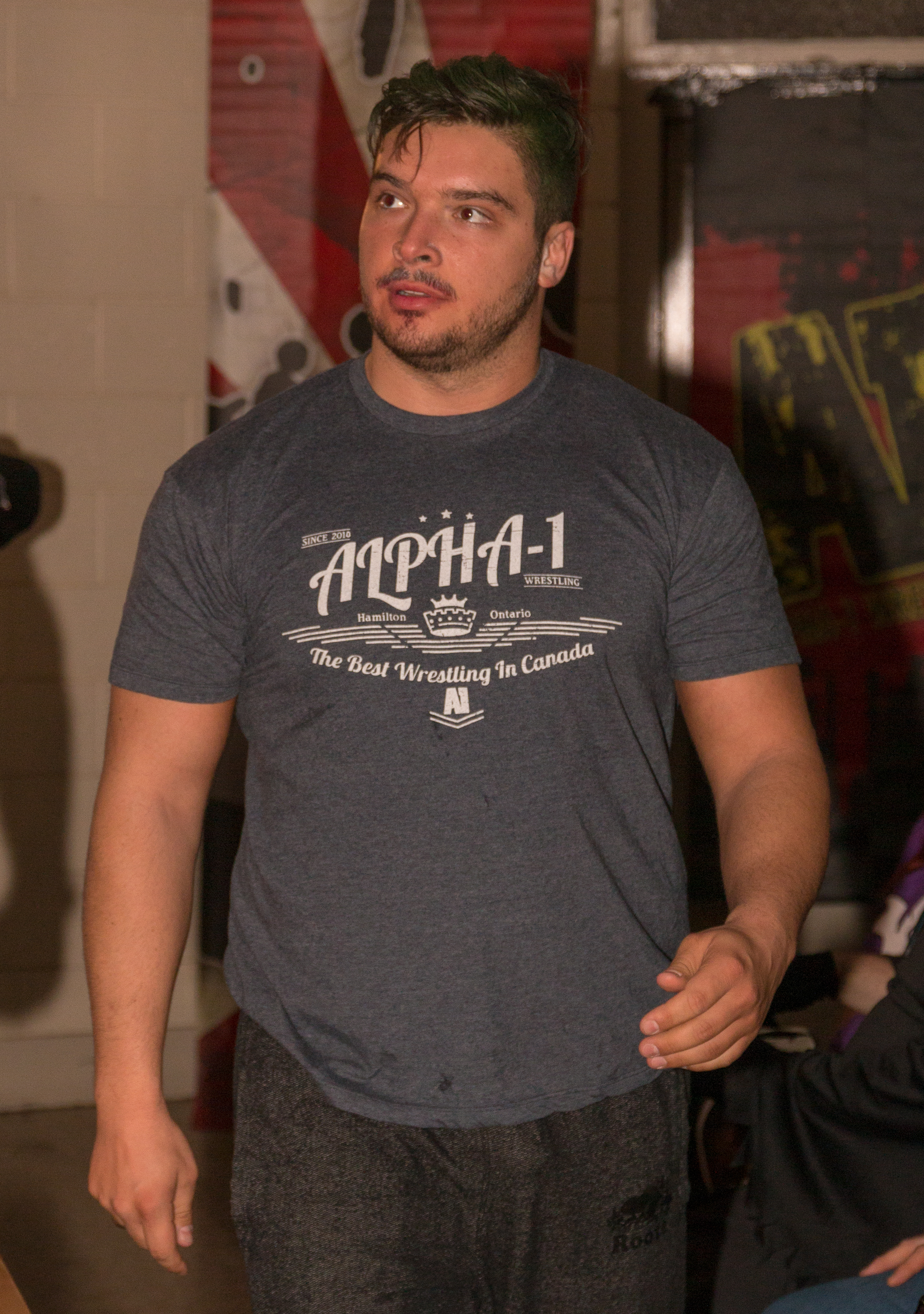
Ethan Page

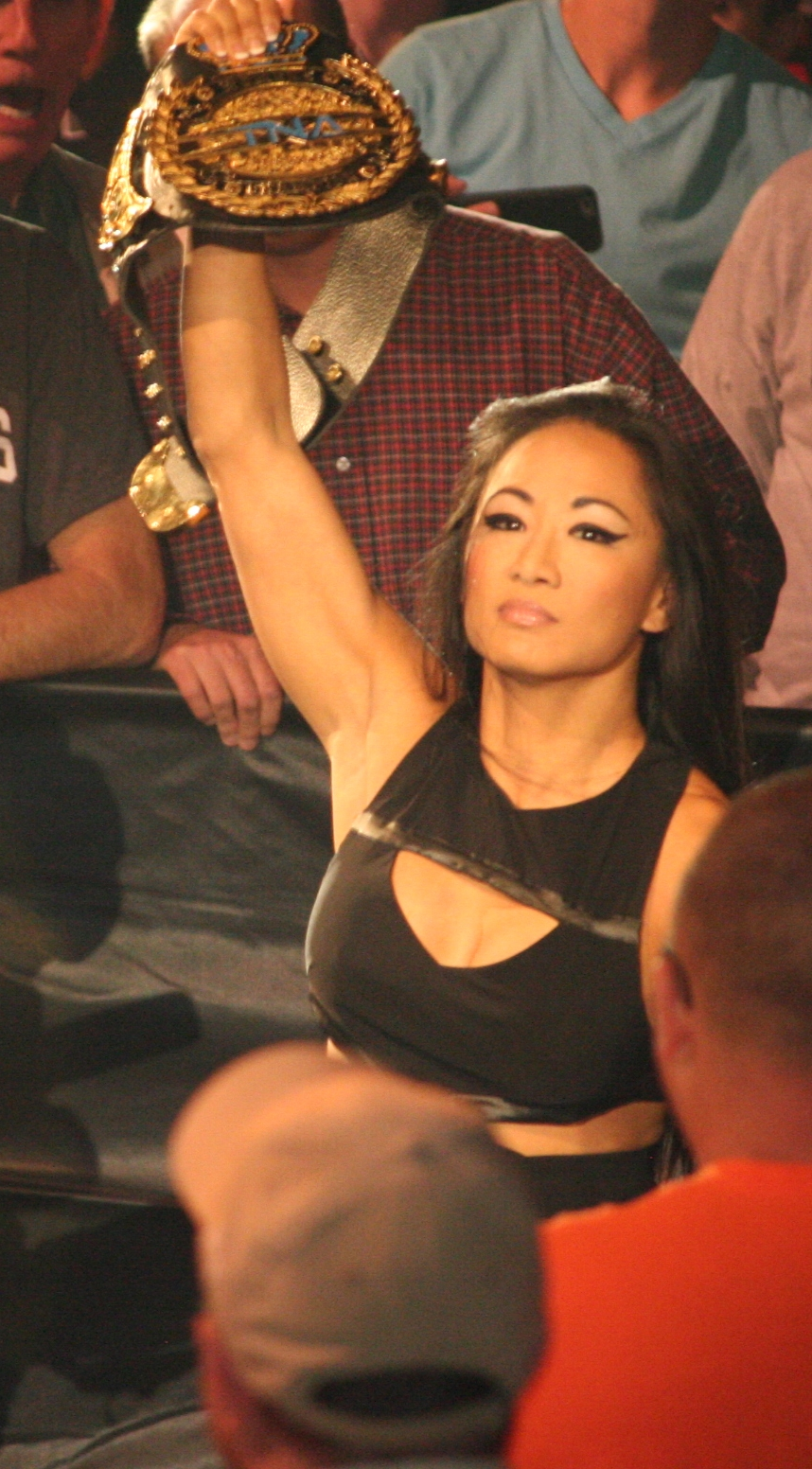
Gail Kim

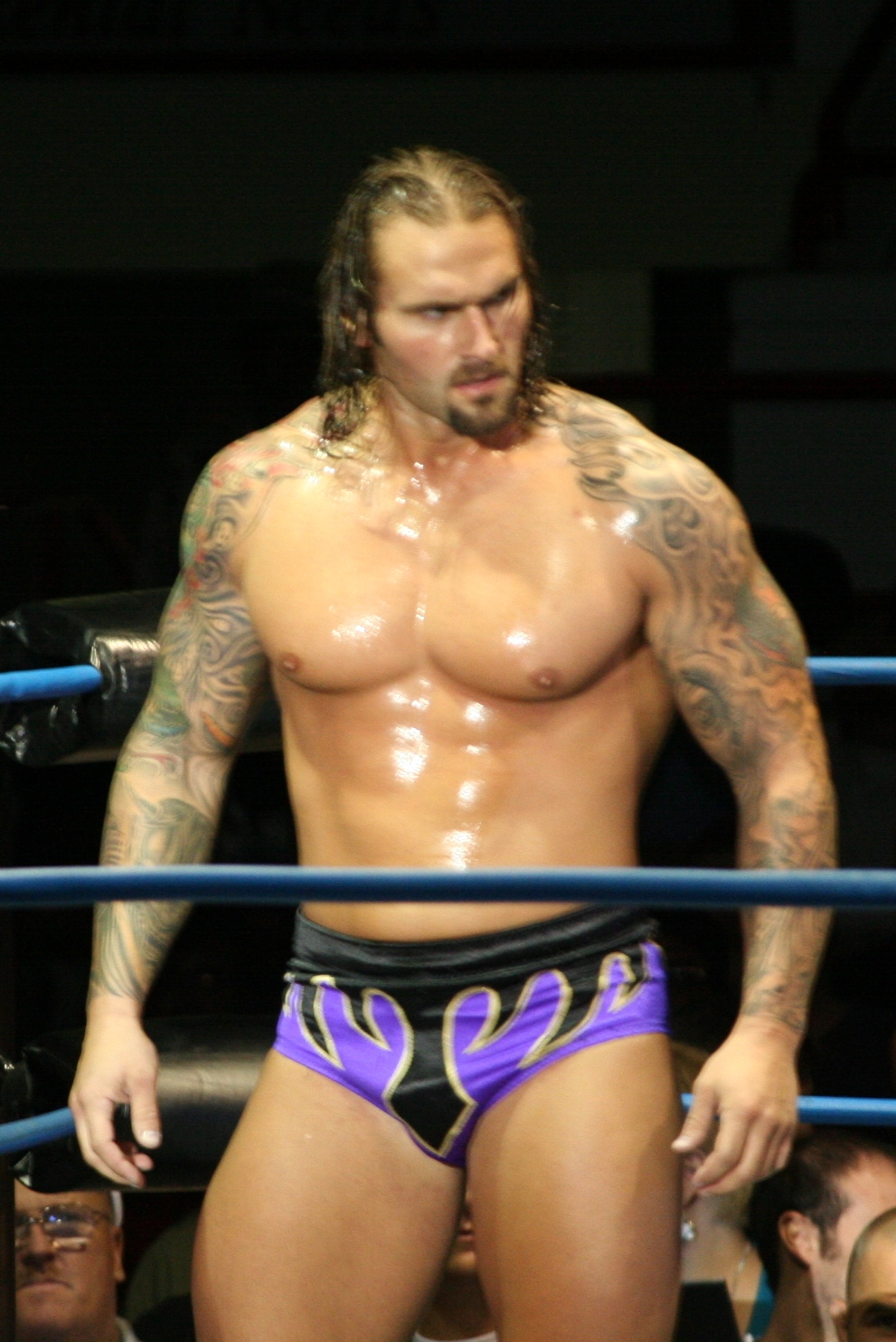
Gunner

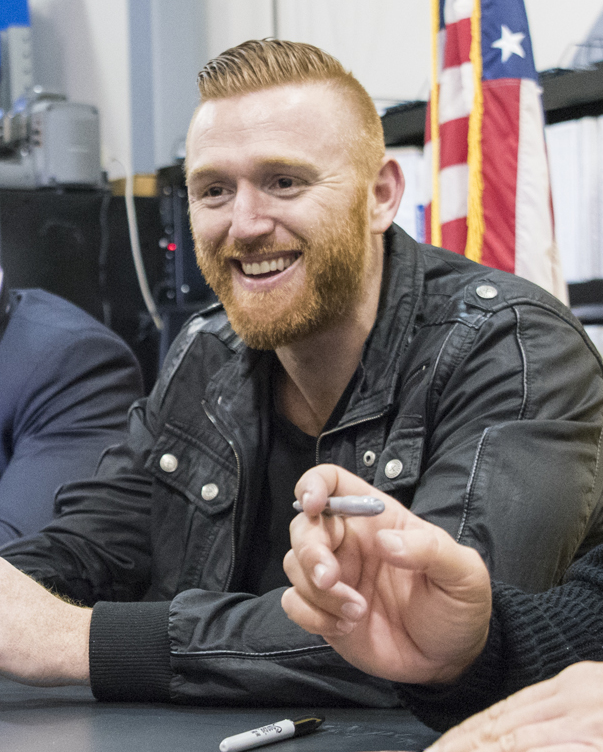
Heath

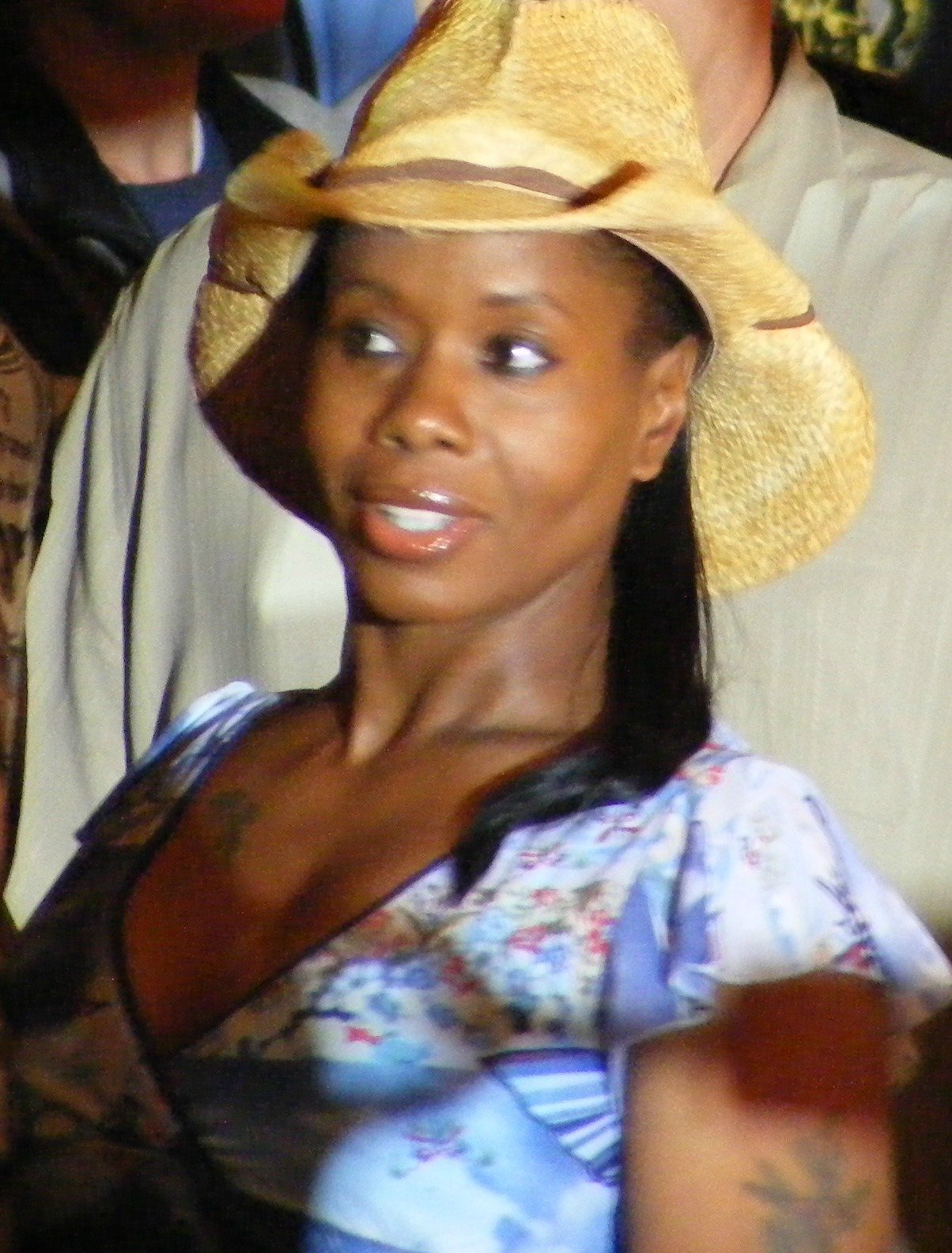
Jacqueline Moore

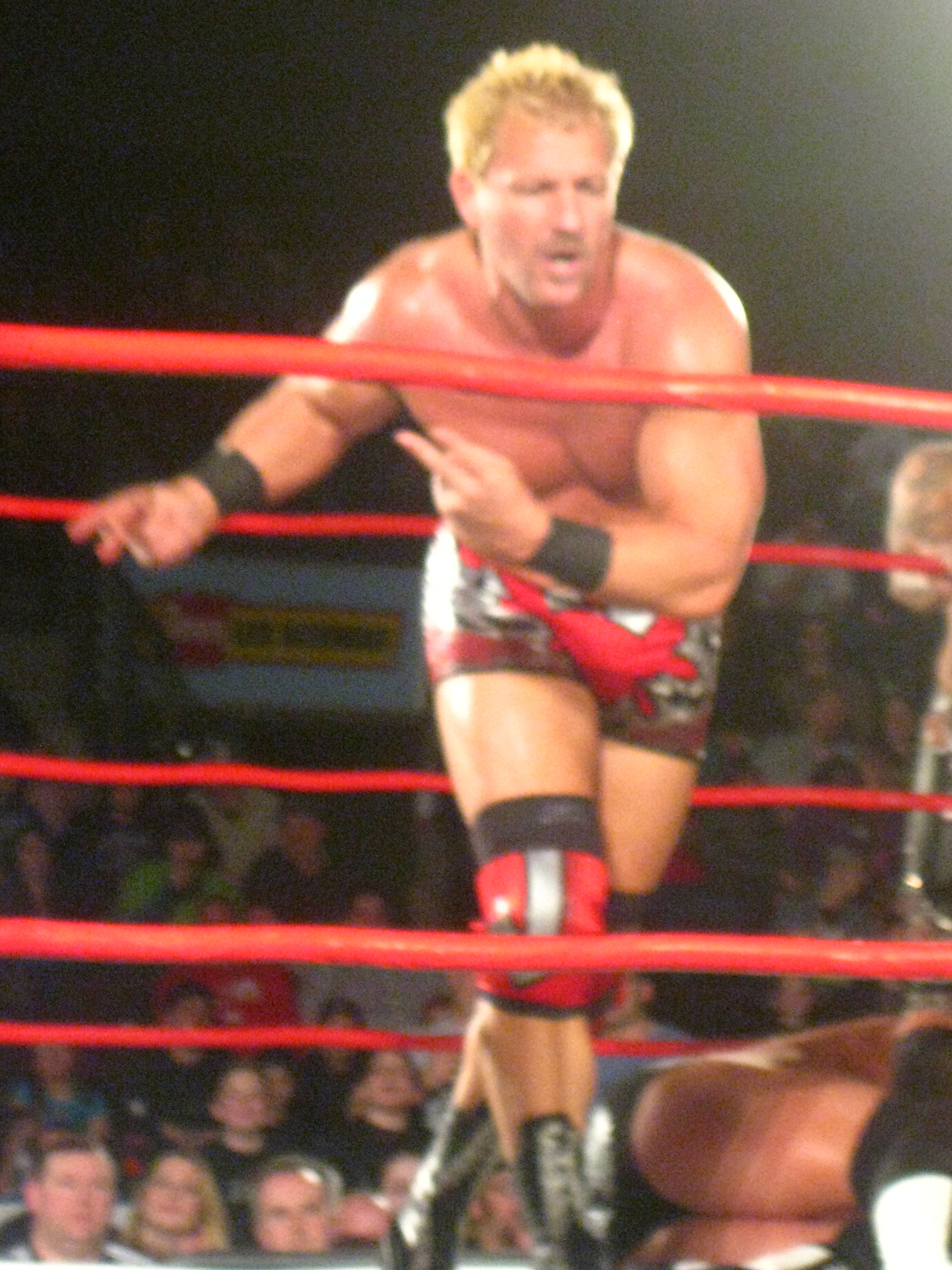
Jeff Jarrett

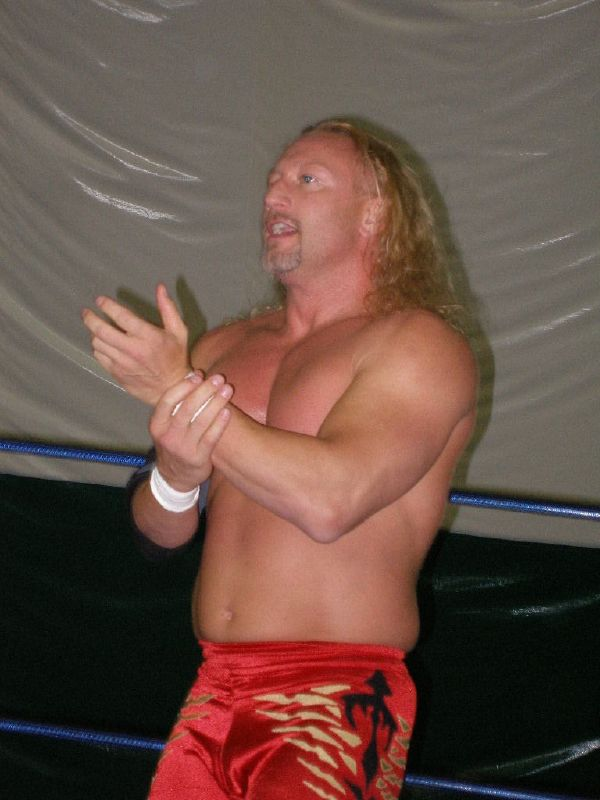
Jerry Lynn

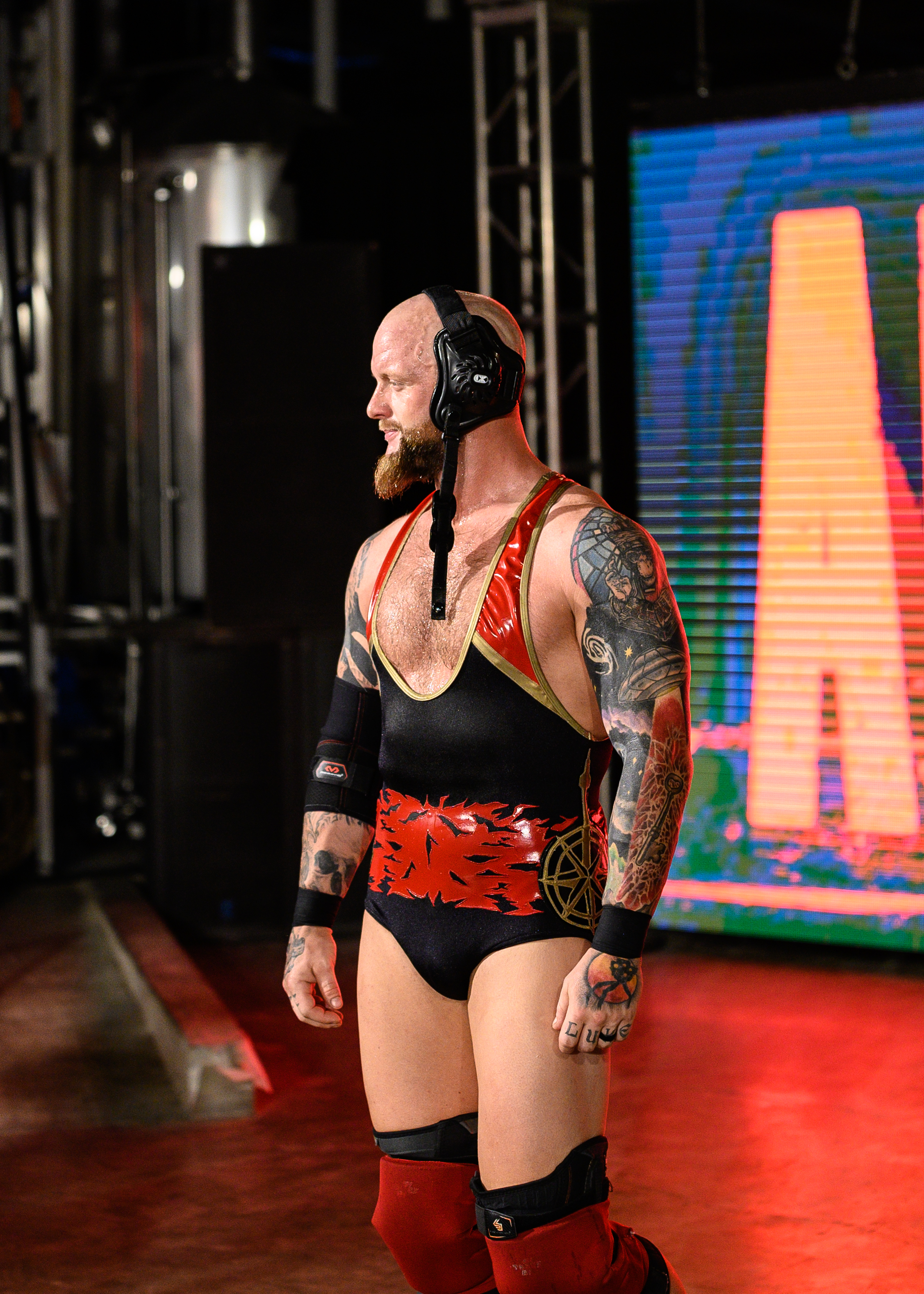
Josh Alexander

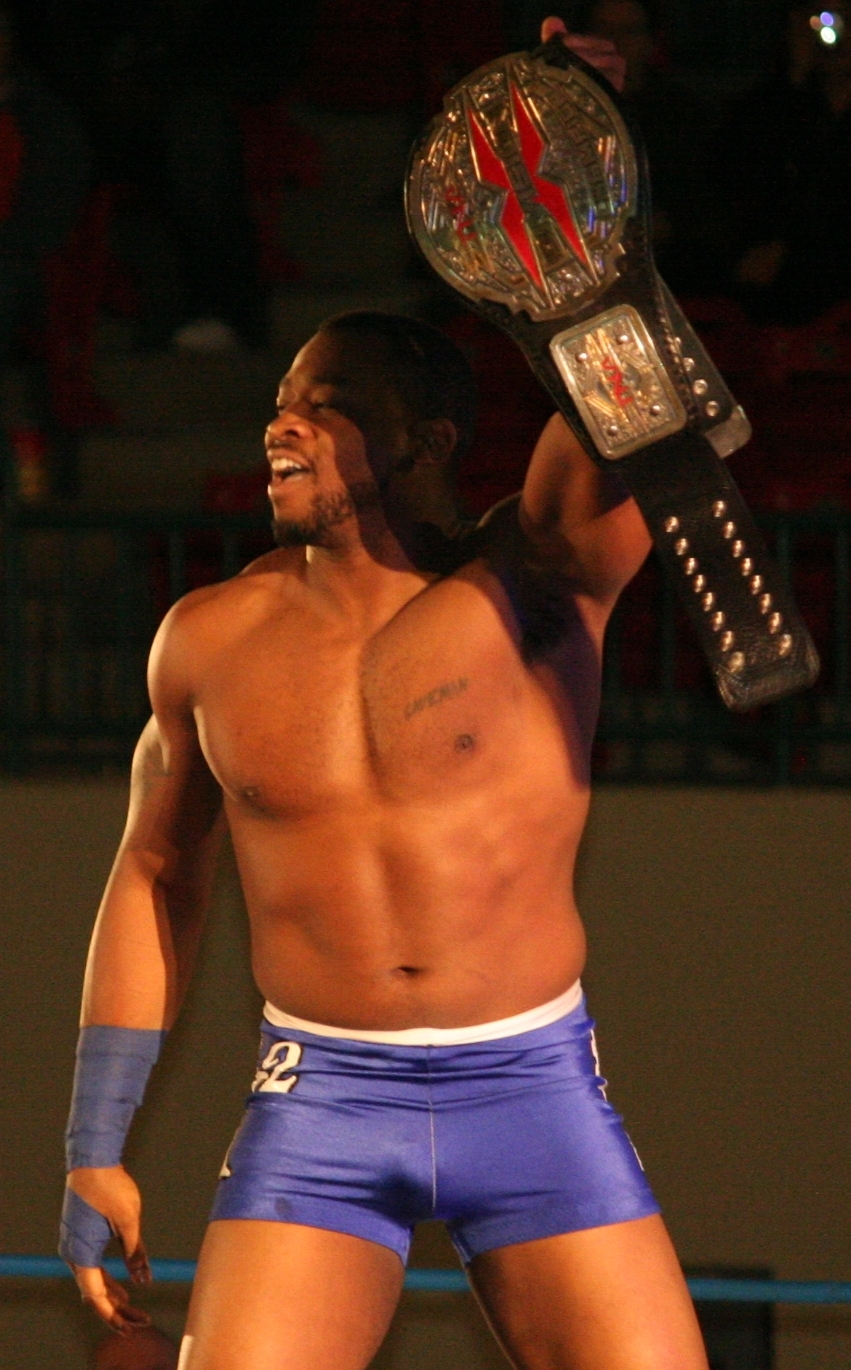
Kenny King

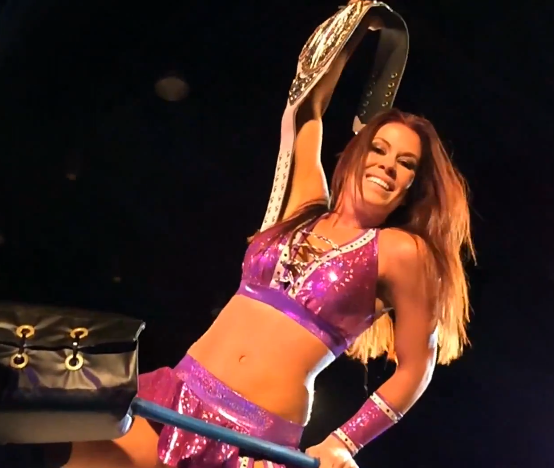
Madison Rayne

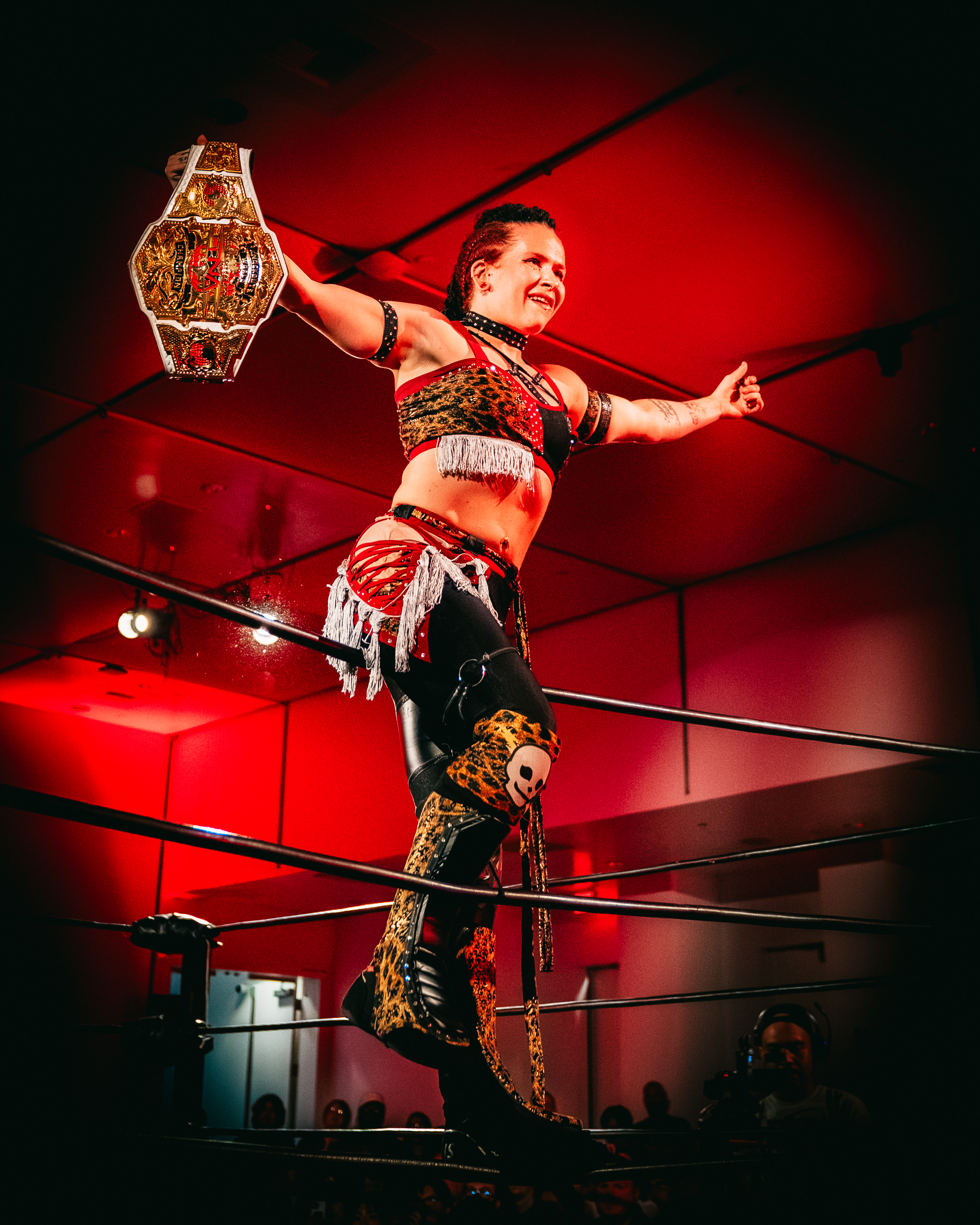
Masha Slamovich

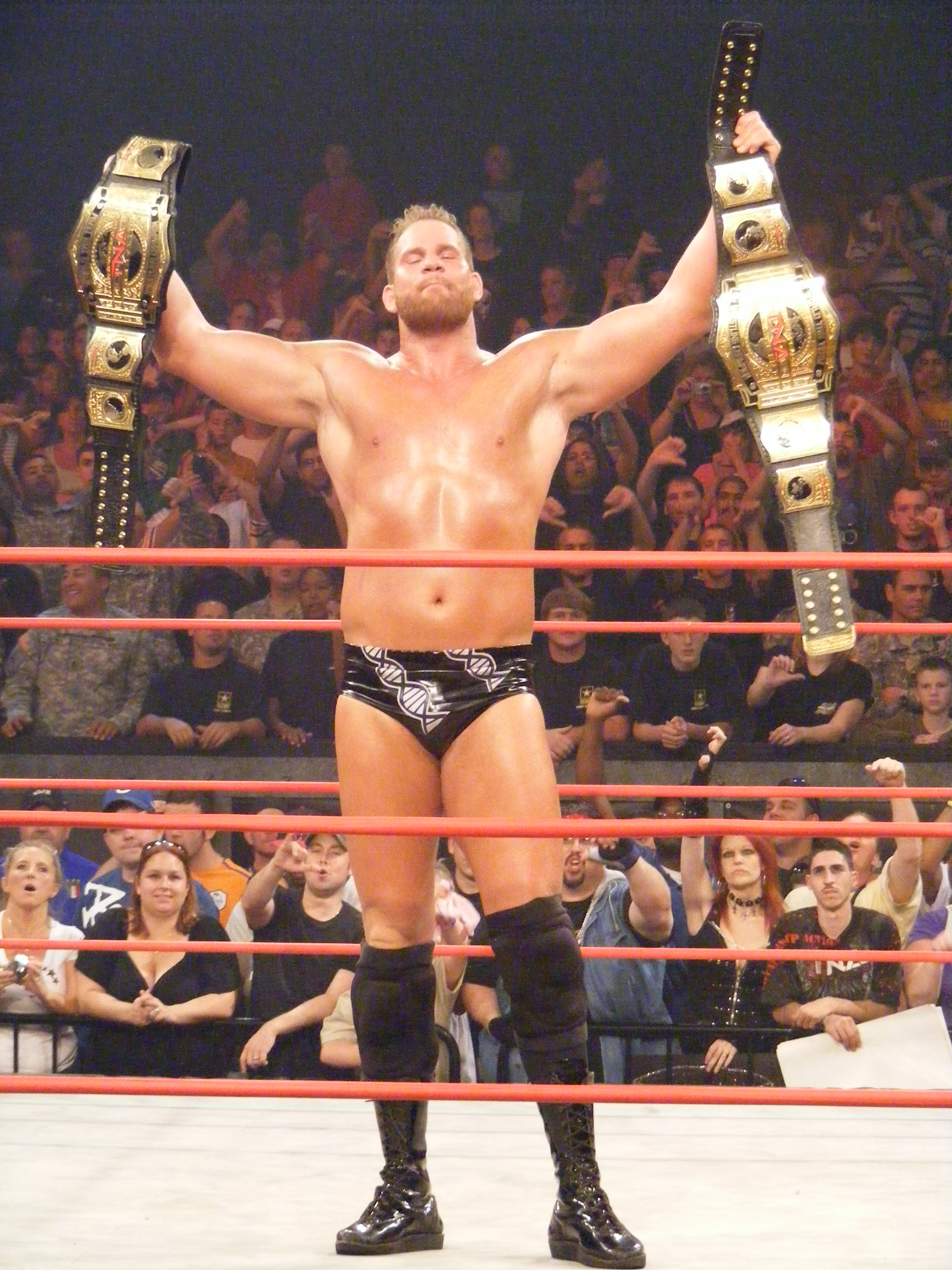
Matt Morgan

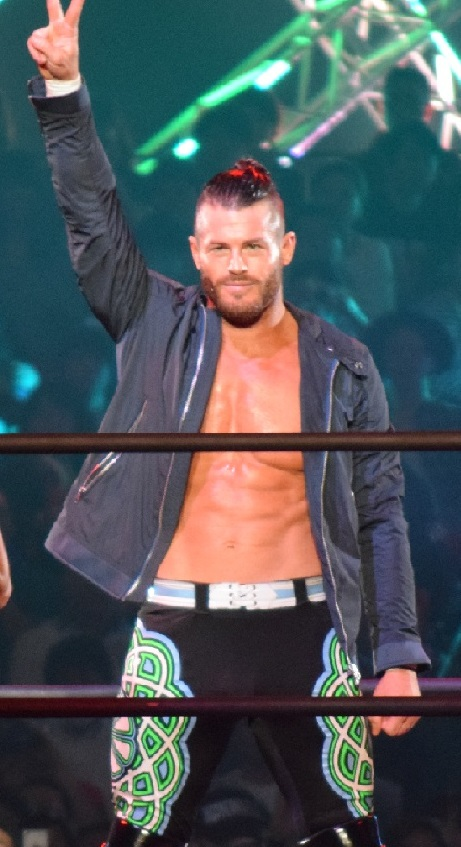
Matt Sydal

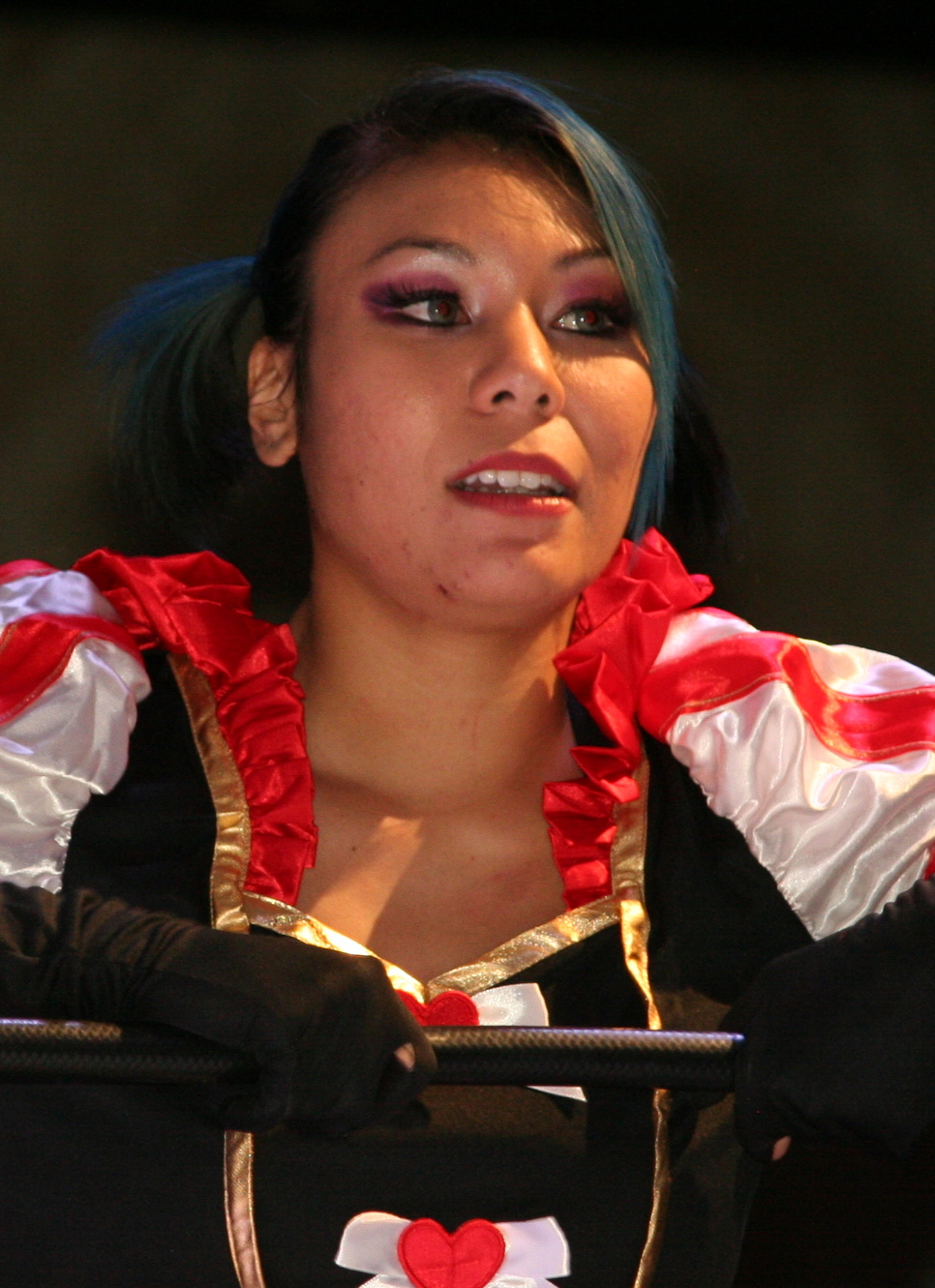
Mia Yim

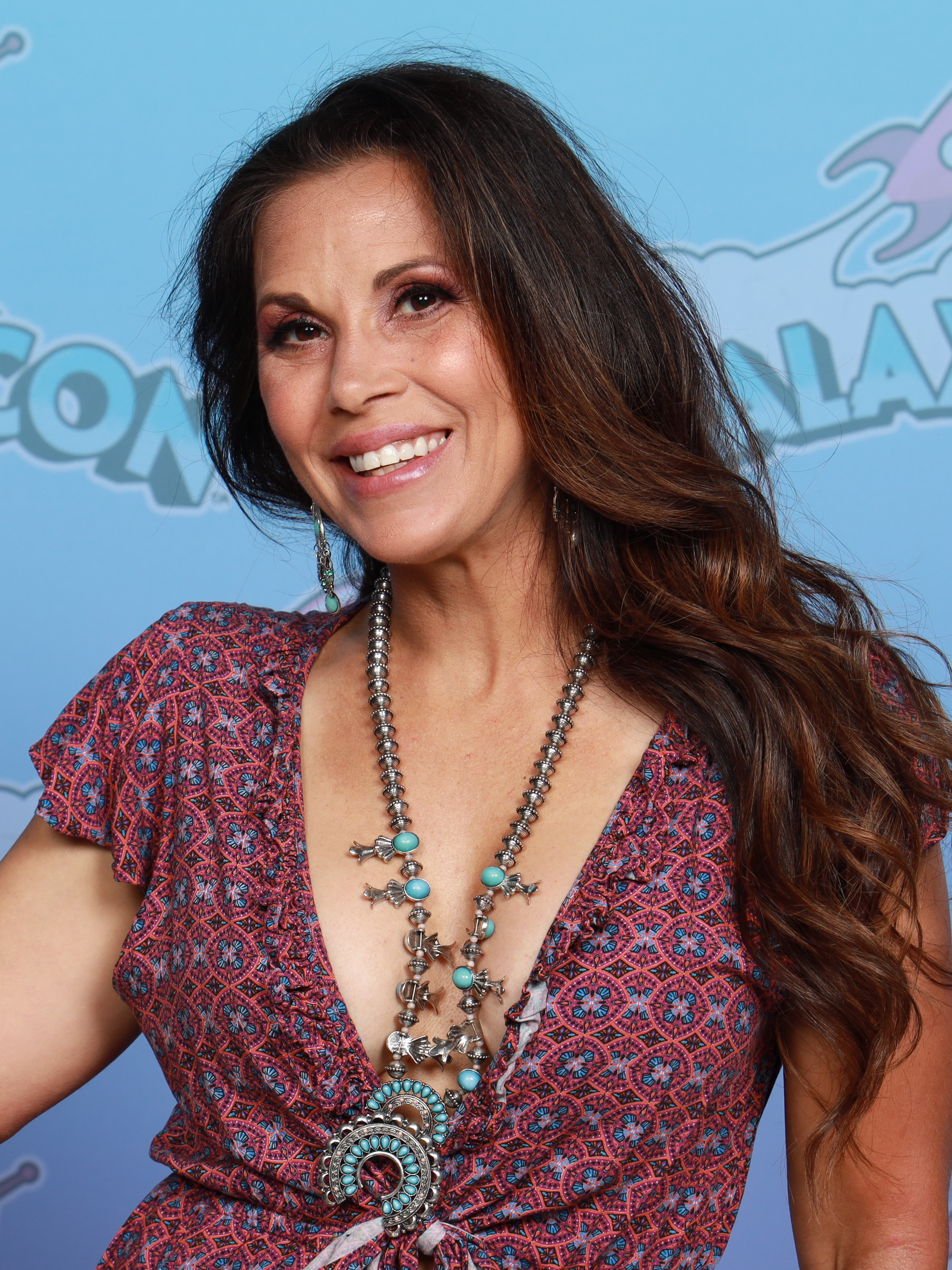
Mickie James

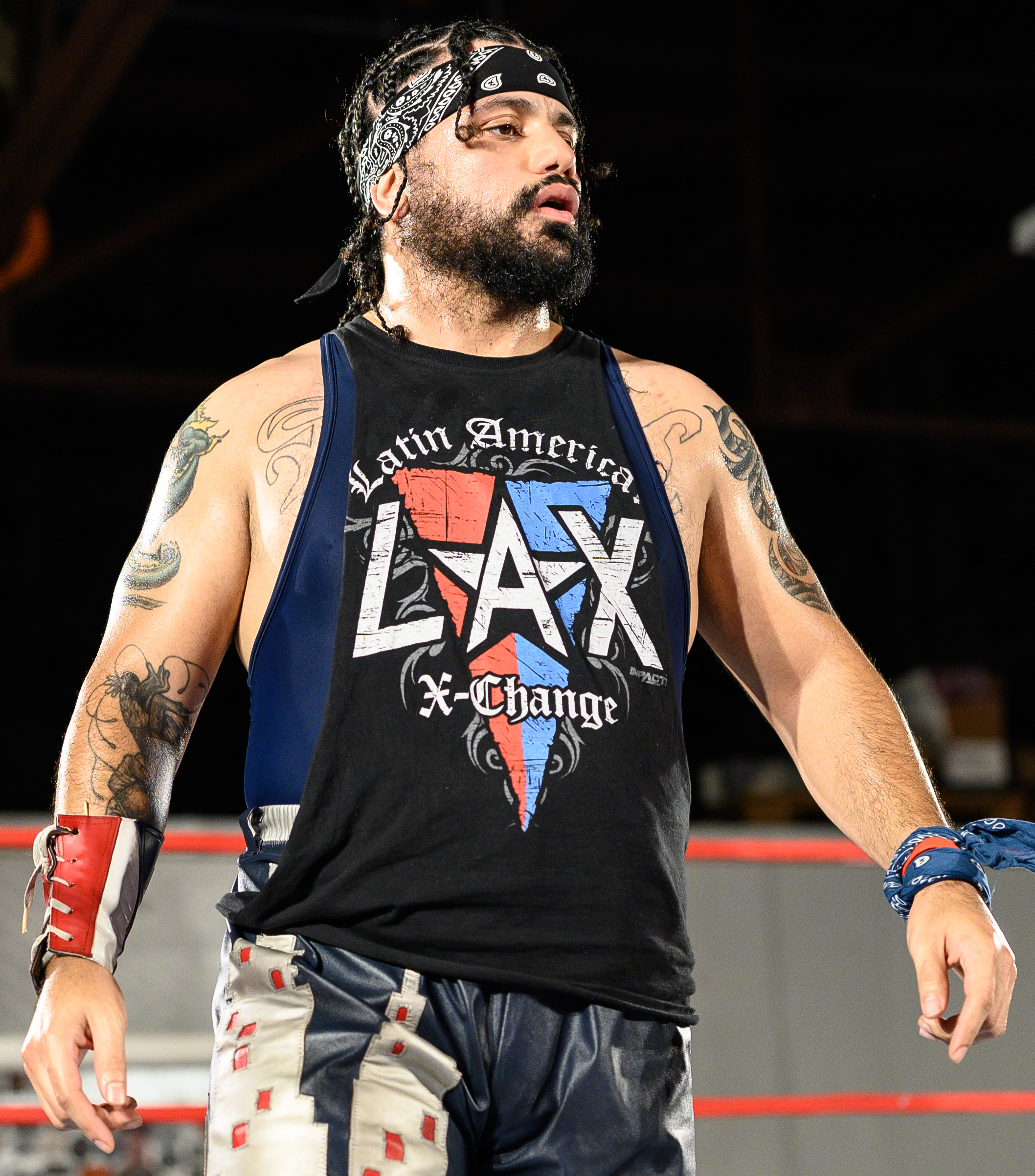
Ortiz

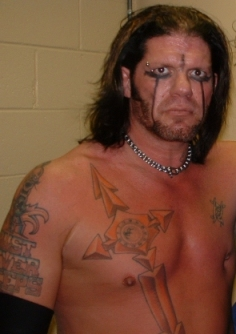
Raven

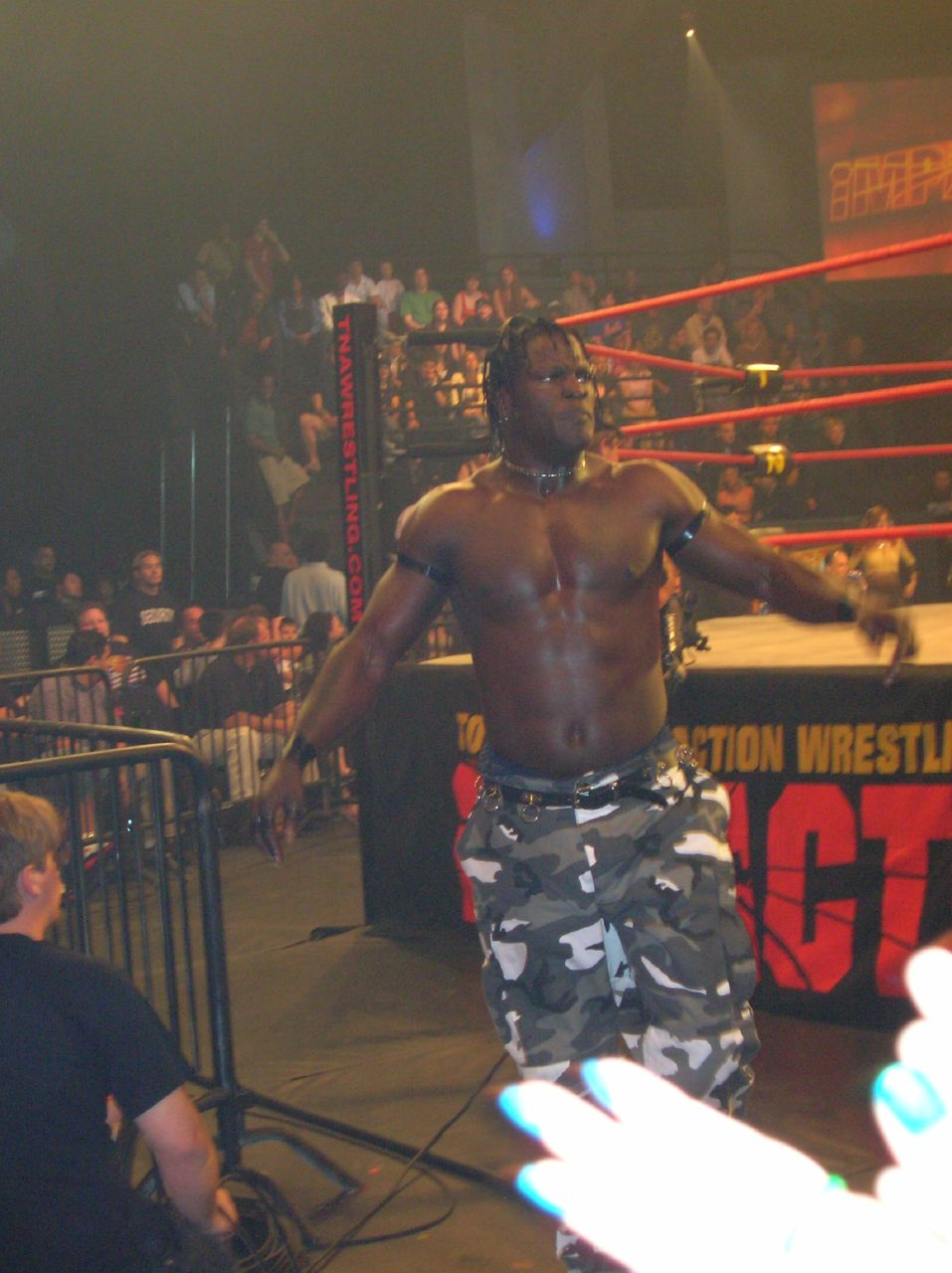
Ron Killings

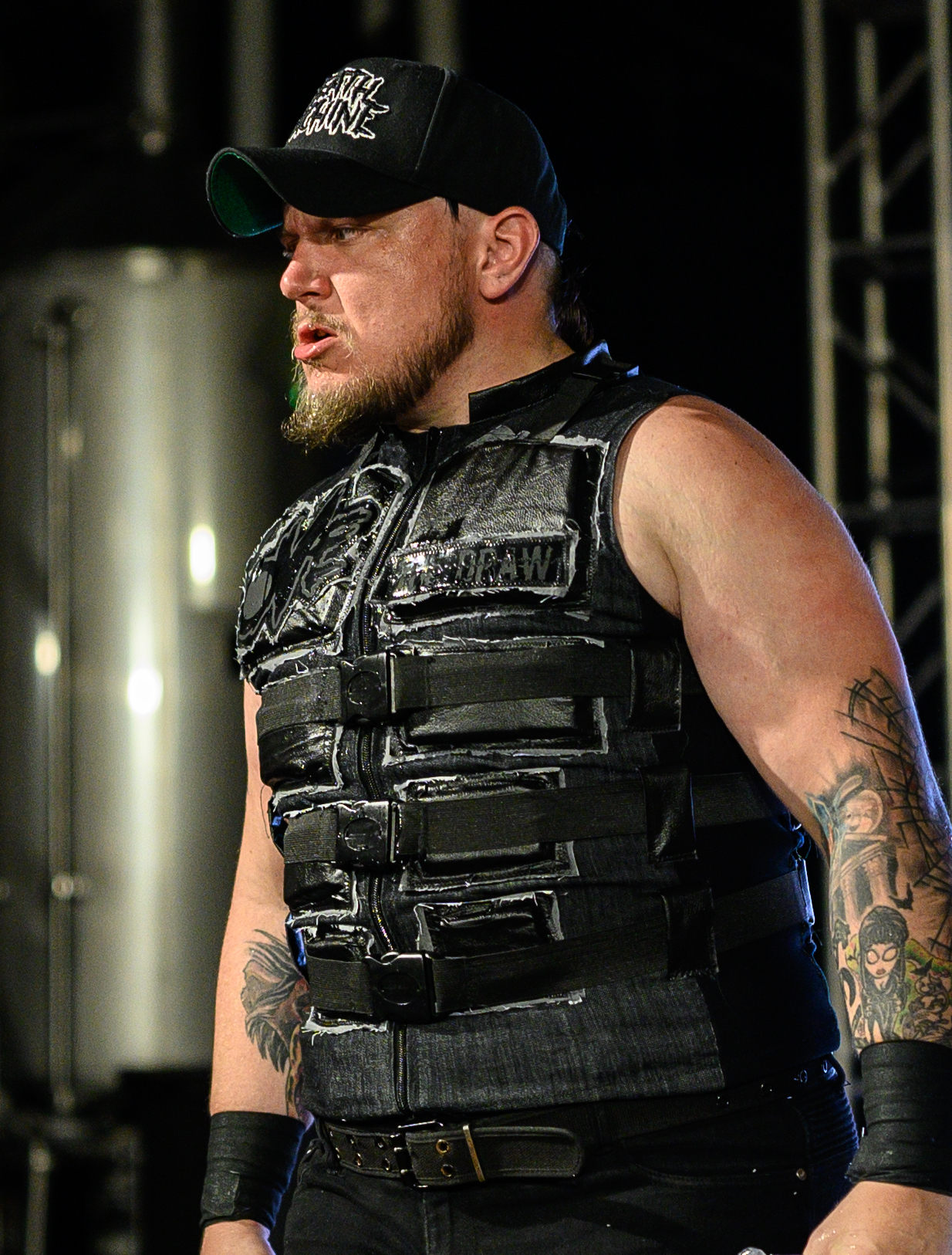
Sami Callihan

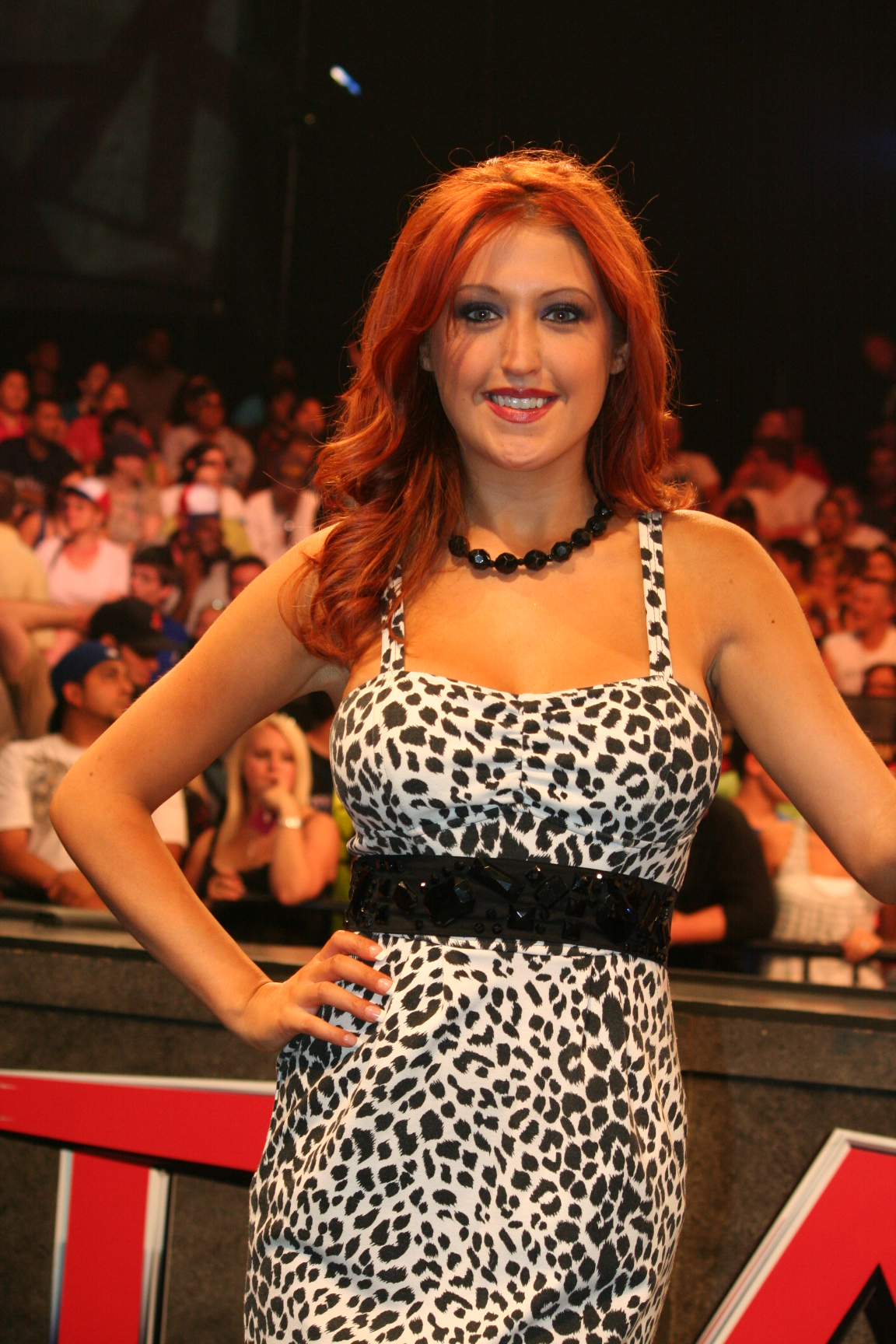
SoCal Val

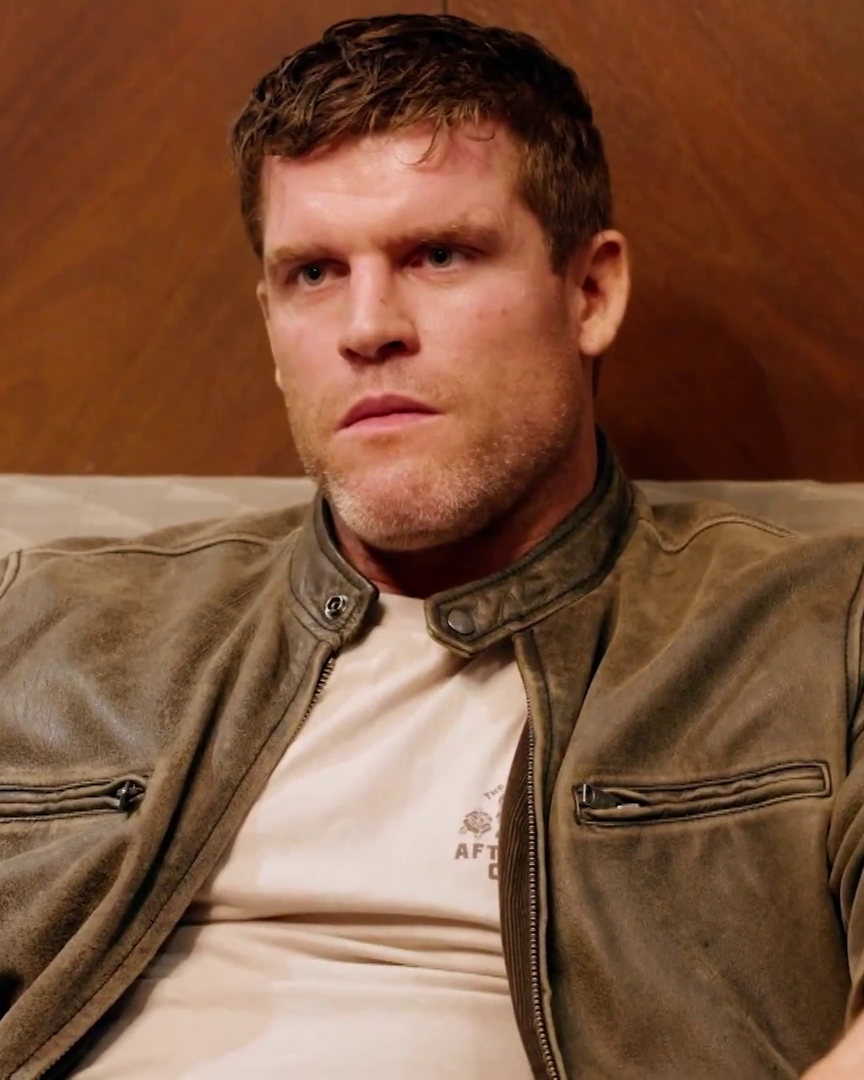
Steve Maclin

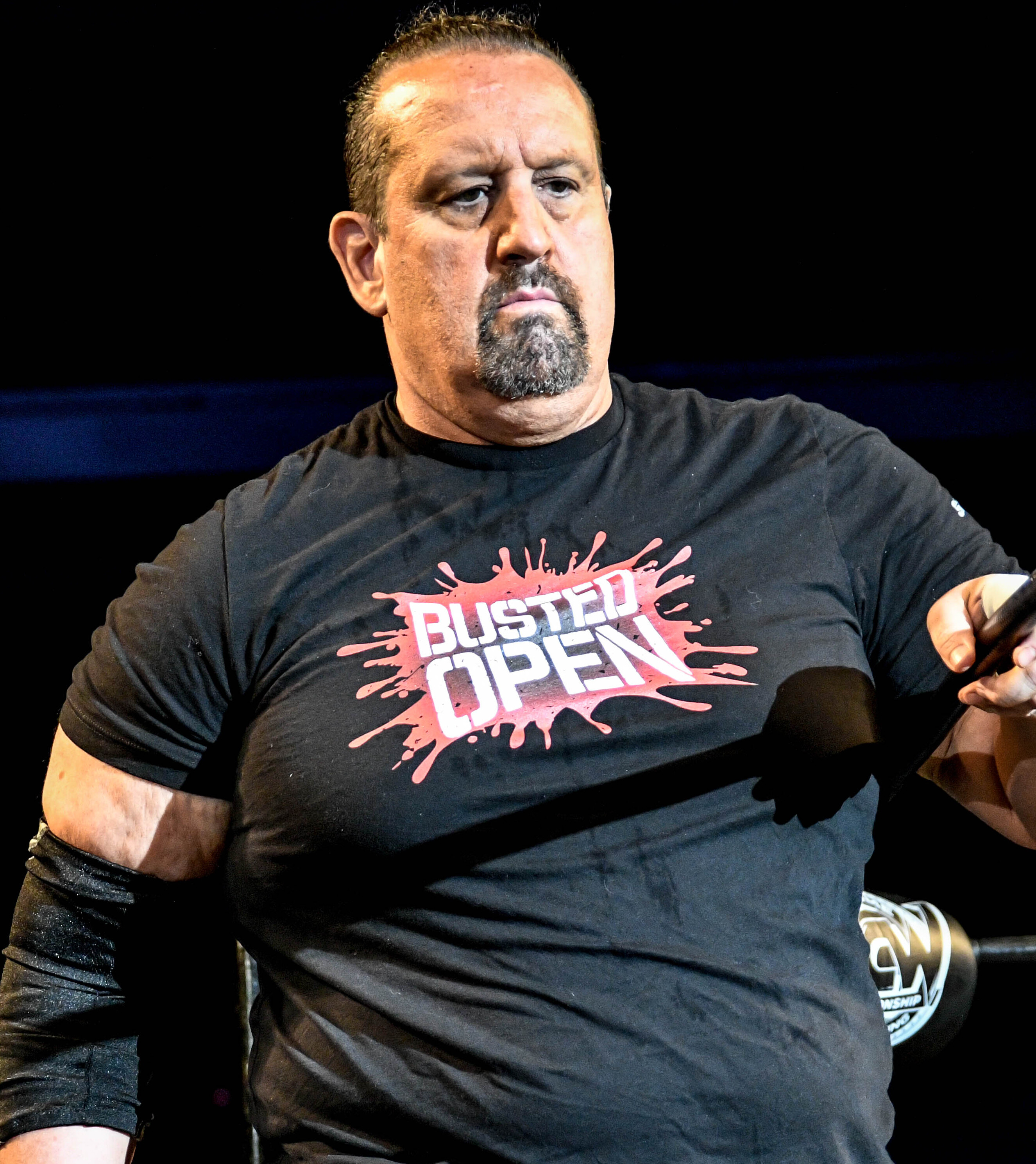
Tommy Dreamer

Birth name	Ring name (s)	Tenure	Ref
Unknown	Sean Lee	2004	
Unknown	Quiten Lee	2003	
Unknown	Scotty Matthews	2003; 2004	
Unknown	Shane Matthews	2004	
Unknown	Tim McCloud	2003	
Ramón Ibarra	Volador Jr. Volado	2008	
Ken Infante	J.R. Ryder	2003; 2004	
Masao Inoue	Masao Inoue	2004	
Francisco Islas	Super Crazy	2003	
Taichi Ishikari	Taichi Ishikari	2004	
José Luis Jair	Shocker	2005–2006	
Brian James	B.G. James; The Bullet	2002–2009; 2010	
Joseph Melton James †	Bob Armstrong	2002; 2005–2006	
Mickie James	Alexis Laree; Mickie James	2002–2004; 2010–2013; 2015; 2021–2023	
Amy Janas	Lorelei	2009	
Jeff Jarrett	Jeff Jarrett	2002–2014; 2015; 2017	
Jerry Jarrett †	Jerry Jarrett	2002–2005	
John Jirus †	Xavier	2003; 2010	
Mark Johnson	Slick Johnson	2002–2003; 2005–2010	
Samuel Alton Johnston	Sami Callihan	2017–2023; 2024–2026	
Adam Jones	Adam "Pacman" Jones	2007; 2013	
Allen Jones	AJ Styles	2002–2013	
Lawrence Jones	Larry D Lawrence D	2019–2022	
Orlando Jordan	Orlando Jordan	2010–2011	
Mary Kanellis	Maria; Maria Kanellis-Bennett	2016–2017; 2022	
Christina Kardooni	Toxxin; Christina Von Eerie	2010–2011; 2017	
Johnny Kashmere	Johnny Kashmere	2002	
Ryan Katz	Ryan Katz	2003	
Akira Kawabata	Akira Raijin; Akira; Kiyoshi; Suicide	2007; 2008–2010	
Matthew Kaye	Matt Striker	2021–2022	
Mike Kehner	Mike Kehner	2010	
Rodney Kellman	Dru Onyx	2006	
Brian Kendrick	Brian Kendrick; Spanky	2004; 2010–2012	
Damon Kendrick	Flip Cassanova	2012	
Todd Keneley	Todd Keneley	2012–2013	
Kevin Kesar	Killer Kross	2018–2019	
Anna Khozina	Masha Slamovich	2019–2025	
Mitsunobu Kikuzawa	Ebessan	2004	
Ron Killings	K-Krush; Ron Killings	2002–2007	
Gail Kim	Gail Kim	2004–2008; 2011–2025	
Christopher Kindred	Kobain	2002–2003	
Robert King	Robert King	2016–2017	
Christian Kingdom	Judas Icarus	2024–2026	
Mike Kist	Mikey Tenderfoot	2003	
John Klinger †	Bad Bones	2011; 2014; 2017	
Christopher Klucsarits †	Chris K.	2005	
Dennis Knight	Dennis Knight	2005	
Ronald Knight	Jason Knight	2003	
Brian Knighton †	Axl Rotten	2010	
Kelly Knot	Holly Blossom	2013–2014	
Lucy Knot	Hannah Blossom	2013–2014	
Mickie Knuckles	Moose; Moose Knuckles	2008	
Satoshi Kojima	Satoshi Kojima	2021	
Tautuiaki Koloamatangi	Hikuleo	2021	
Nikita Koloff	Mr. Wrestling IV; Nikita Koloff	2002–2003	
Matthew Korklan	Matt Sydal	2004–2005; 2017–2019	
Tony Kozina	Tony Kozina	2015	
Martin Krcaj	Truth Martini	2003	
Stephen Kupryk	Steve Maclin	2021–2026	
Yujiro Kushida	Kushida	2022–2024	
Mark Kyle	Killer Kyle	2003	
Thomas La Ruffa	Basile Baraka	2016	
Chad Lail	Gunner	2010–2015	
Alan Lamb	Alan Steel	2003	
Alice Lane	Alice Lane	2025–2026	
Franklin Lashley	Bobby Lashley; Lashley	2009–2010; 2014–2018	
Thomas Latimer	Bram	2014–2017	
Thomas James Laughlin	Tommy Dreamer	2010–2011; 2013–2015; 2018–2026	
Joanie Laurer †	Chyna	2011	
Joseph Laurinaitis †	Animal	2002–2003; 2007	
Muhammed Lawal	King Mo	2012–2015; 2017	
Brian Lawler †	Brian Lawler; Brian Christopher	2002–2003	
Kenneth Layne	Kenny Layne; Kenny King	2005–2006; 2012–2015; 2022–2023	
David Lee	Gutter	2004	
Sarah Lee †	Sara; Sara Lee	2002–2003; 2004	
Stephanie Lee	Jade; Mia Yim	2013–2014; 2015–2017; 2022	
Joshua Lemay	Josh Alexander	2019–2025	
Alipate Leone	Tama Tonga	2022	
Johnathan LeRoux	Lash LeRoux	2002; 2004	
Seth Lesser	Ryan Drago; Simon Gotch	2006; 2024	
Scott Levy	Raven	2003–2008; 2009–2010	
Eric Lewis	Eric Darkstorm	2004	
Chris Lindsey	Roderick Strong	2003; 2005–2006; 2010	
Raymond Lloyd	Glacier	2005	
Michael Lockwood †	Mad Mikey	2003	
Vito LoGrasso	Vito LoGrasso; Big Vito	2004	
Ashley Lomberger	Madison Rayne	2009–2013; 2013–2017; 2018–2022	
Joshua Lomberger	Josh Mathews	2014–2025	
Paul London	Paul London	2003	
Colby Lopez	Tyler Black	2006	
Raquel Lourenço	Killer Kelly	2020; 2022–2026	
Crystal Louthan	Crystal	2007–2008	
Marty Lurie	C. Edward Vander Pyle	2006	
Cynthia Lynch	Bobcat	2002	
Eric Lynch †	Eric The Actor	2012	
Jeremy Lynn	Jerry Lynn	2002–2007; 2010–2011; 2013	
Jaime Lynne	Lollipop	2003–2004	
Aaron Lyons	Lazz	2003	
Daniel Lyon	Super Dragon	2004	
Kirby Mack	Kirby Mack	2006	
T.J. Mack	T.J. Mack	2006	
Michael Manna	Dr. Stevie; Dr. Stevie Richards; Stevie Richards	2009–2011	
Matthew Marinelli	Matt Taven	2022	
James Maritato	Guido Maritato; Little Guido	2010; 2013; 2022	
Elias Markopoulos	Evan Markopoulos	2012	
Sterling Marlin	Sterling Marlin	2002	
Debra Marshall	Debra	2006	
Kristal Marshall	Kristal Lashley	2009–2010	
Andrew Martin †	Andrew Martin	2007	
Patrick Martin	Alex Shelley	2004–2012; 2020–2021; 2022–2024	
Troy Martin	Shane Douglas	2003–2007; 2009	
Shelly Martinez	Shelly Martinez; Salinas	2007–2008; 2016	
William Massengale	Jason Cross	2002–2004	
Matthew Massie	Matt Jackson; Max; Max Buck	2009–2011; 2013	
Nicholas Massie	Nick Jackson; Jeremy; Jeremy Buck	2009–2011; 2013	
Shannon Mateer	Myla Grace	2025–2026	
Thomas Matera	Antonio Thomas	2007	
Nate Mattson	N-8 Mattson	2003; 2004	
Bonnie Maxon	Payton Banks; Ms. Payton Banks; Rain	2007–2008	
Paige Mayo	SoCal Val	2006–2013	
Gisele Mayordo	Gisele Shaw	2018; 2022–2024	
Anthony Mayweather	Crimson; Mayweather	2010–2013; 2015; 2017	
Willie McClinton Jr.	Willie Mack	2018–2022	
Kevin McDonald	Kevin Matthews	2004	
Ed McGuckin	Rubix	2012; 2013	
Cassandra McIntosh	Cassie Lee	2021–2022; 2025–2026	
Jessica McKay	Jessie McKay	2021–2022; 2025–2026	
Stephen McMichael †	Steve McMichael	2008	
Kyle McNeely	Onyx	2003; 2004	
Ashley Medrano	Ashley Vox	2020–2021	
Elizabeth Medrano	Delmi Exo	2020–2021	
Joseph Meehan	Joey Ryan; Joseph P. Ryan	2012–2013; 2019–2020	
Adam Meija	A.M. Vishion	2003	
Chris Melendez	Chris Melendez	2014–2016	
Hector Melendez	Moody Melendez; Hector Melendez; Moody Jack Melendez	2004–2006	
Marc Mero	Johnny B. Badd	2004–2005	
Wayne Meyer	Lex Lovett	2003; 2004–2005; 2006	
Julian Micevsky	Ethan Page; The Karate Man	2017–2020	
Raymond Rawls	Raymond Rawls	2002	
Trina Michaels	Trina Michaels	2009	
Elizabeth Miklosi	Cheerleader Valentina; Lizzy Valentine; VJ Love	2003; 2009	
Butch Miller †	Bushwhacker Butch	2007	
Heath Miller	Heath	2020–2023	
Jack Miller	Jack Evans	2004; 2011; 2022	
Jim Miller	Jim Miller	2002	
Quirt Miller	Mance Warner	2025–2026	
Francois Miquet †	Corsica Joe	2002–2003; 2004	
Kazushi Miyamoto	Miyamoto	2004	
Miguel Molina	Ortiz	2016–2019	
Tyson Moody	Tyson Dux	2006; 2008	
William Moody †	Percy Pringle III	2002–2003	
Edward Moore	Kingston; King	2016–2017; 2018	
Jacqueline Moore	Jacqueline; Jacqueline Moore; Jackie; Jackie Moore; Miss Jacqueline; Miss Tennessee	2004; 2006; 2007–2009; 2011; 2013	
Shannon Moore	Shannon Moore	2005–2006; 2010–2012	
Carlene Moore-Begnaud	Jazz	2020–2021	
Jenna Morasca	Jenna Morasca	2009	
Jorge Moraza	Jorge Estrada	2002–2003	
Christopher Mordetzky	Chris Adonis; Chris Mordetzky	2015; 2017–2018	
Matt Morgan	Matt Morgan	2007–2013; 2015; 2017	
Sean Morley	Sean Morley	2010	
Dan Morrison	Danny Doring	2003	
James Morrison	J. J. Dillon	2003	
William Morrissey	W. Morrissey	2021–2022	
Richard Morton	Ricky Morton	2002–2003	
William Mueller	Stan Dupp; Jethro Holliday	2002; 2009	
Joey Munoz	Joey Idol; Kaos	2002; 2003	
George Murdoch	Tyrus	2014–2017; 2018	
Jamal Mustafa	Mustafa Saed	2010	
Keiji Mutoh	The Great Muta	2007; 2014	
William Myers †	George Steele	2008	

Company name to Year
NWA: Total Nonstop Action	2002–2004
Total Nonstop Action Wrestling	2004–2017, 2024–present
Global Force Wrestling	June–September 2017
Impact Wrestling	March–June 2017, September 2017–January 2024
Notes
† Indicates they are deceased

== See also ==
- List of Total Nonstop Action Wrestling personnel
