= Lorelei Lee =

Lorelei Lee may refer to:

- Lorelei Lee (wrestler) (born 1982), American professional wrestler
- Lorelei Lee (actor) (born 1981 or 1982), American pornographic film actor and writer
- Lorelei Lee, fictional protagonist of the 1925 novel Gentlemen Prefer Blondes and its adaptations
